= Chapel of All Saints, Tarnobrzeg =

Religious building in Tarnobrzeg, Poland

Coordinates: 50°35′53.11″N 21°43′45.50″E

Chapel of All Saints
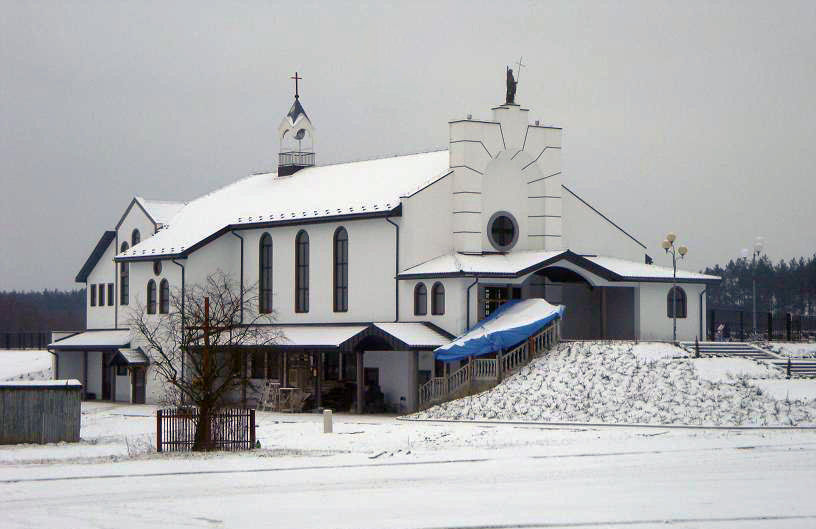
- View from the side of the Litewska Street

Religion
- Affiliation: Roman Catholic
- Diocese: Sobów
- Rite: Latin Rite
- Status: building of Serbinow parish of Our Lady of Perpetual Help in Tarnobrzeg

Location
- Municipality: Tarnobrzeg
- Interactive map of Chapel of All Saints

Architecture
- Architect: ??
- Type: Church
- Style: Functionalism
- Groundbreaking: 2009
- Completed: 2009

The Chapel of All Saints is located in Tarnobrzeg, Poland (Polish: Kaplica Wszystkich Świętych w Tarnobrzegu) in Sobów Borough, on a municipal cemetery, on Litewska Street. The building was initiated by the provost of Serbinów parish of Our Lady of Perpetual Help Michał Józefczyk. Work started at the beginning of 2009, and ended at the end of October.
