= Serbinów (disambiguation) =

Serbinów is a village in Świętokrzyskie Voivodeship.

Serbinów' may also refer to:

- Serbinów (Borough in Tarnobrzeg), a borough in Tarnobrzeg, Subcarpathian Voivodeship
- Serbinów (Nights and Days), the setting of the novel Nights and Days, see Serbinów, Tarnobrzeg
