= Zaborowice, Świętokrzyskie Voivodeship =

Zaborowice
- Village
- Location within Poland
- Coordinates: 51°2′5″N 20°28′25″E
- Country: Poland
- Voivodeship: Świętokrzyskie
- County: Kielce
- Gmina: Mniów
- Population: 779

Zaborowice [zabɔrɔˈvit͡sɛ] is a village in the administrative district of Gmina Mniów, within Kielce County, Świętokrzyskie Voivodeship, in south-central Poland. It lies approximately 3 km (2 mi) north of Mniów and 20 km (12 mi) north-west of the regional capital Kielce.
