= Pałęgi =

- Village
- Location within Poland
- Coordinates: 51°0′26″N 20°21′43″E
- Country: Poland
- Voivodeship: Świętokrzyskie
- County: Kielce
- Gmina: Mniów
- Population: 327

Pałęgi [paˈwɛŋɡi] is a village in the administrative district of Gmina Mniów, within Kielce County, Świętokrzyskie Voivodeship, in south-central Poland. It lies approximately 9 km (6 mi) west of Mniów and 23 km (14 mi) north-west of the regional capital Kielce.
