= Wólka Kłucka =

- Village
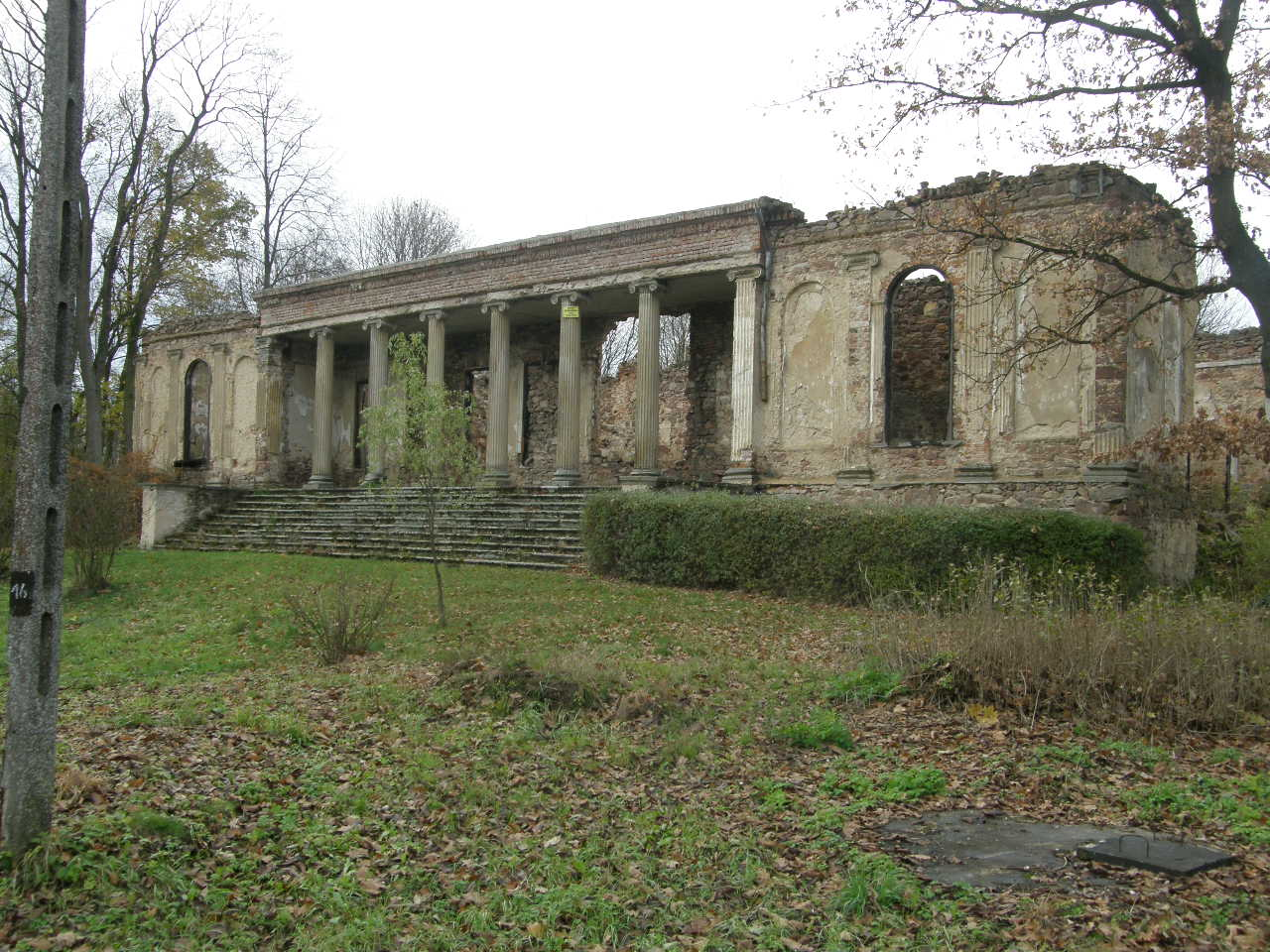
- A palace built around 1830.

- Location within Poland
- Coordinates: 50°59′42″N 20°22′7″E
- Country: Poland
- Voivodeship: Świętokrzyskie
- County: Kielce
- Gmina: Mniów
- Population: 573

Wólka Kłucka [ˈvulka ˈkwut͡ska] is a village in the administrative district of Gmina Mniów, within Kielce County, Świętokrzyskie Voivodeship, in south-central Poland. It lies approximately 9 km (6 mi) west of Mniów and 22 km (14 mi) north-west of the regional capital Kielce.
