= Lisie Jamy =

Lisie Jamy may refer to the following places:

- Lisie Jamy, Pomeranian Voivodeship (north Poland)
- Lisie Jamy, Subcarpathian Voivodeship (south-east Poland)
- Lisie Jamy, Świętokrzyskie Voivodeship (south-central Poland)
- Lisie Jamy, Warmian-Masurian Voivodeship (north Poland)
