= Pępice, Świętokrzyskie Voivodeship =

Pępice
- Village
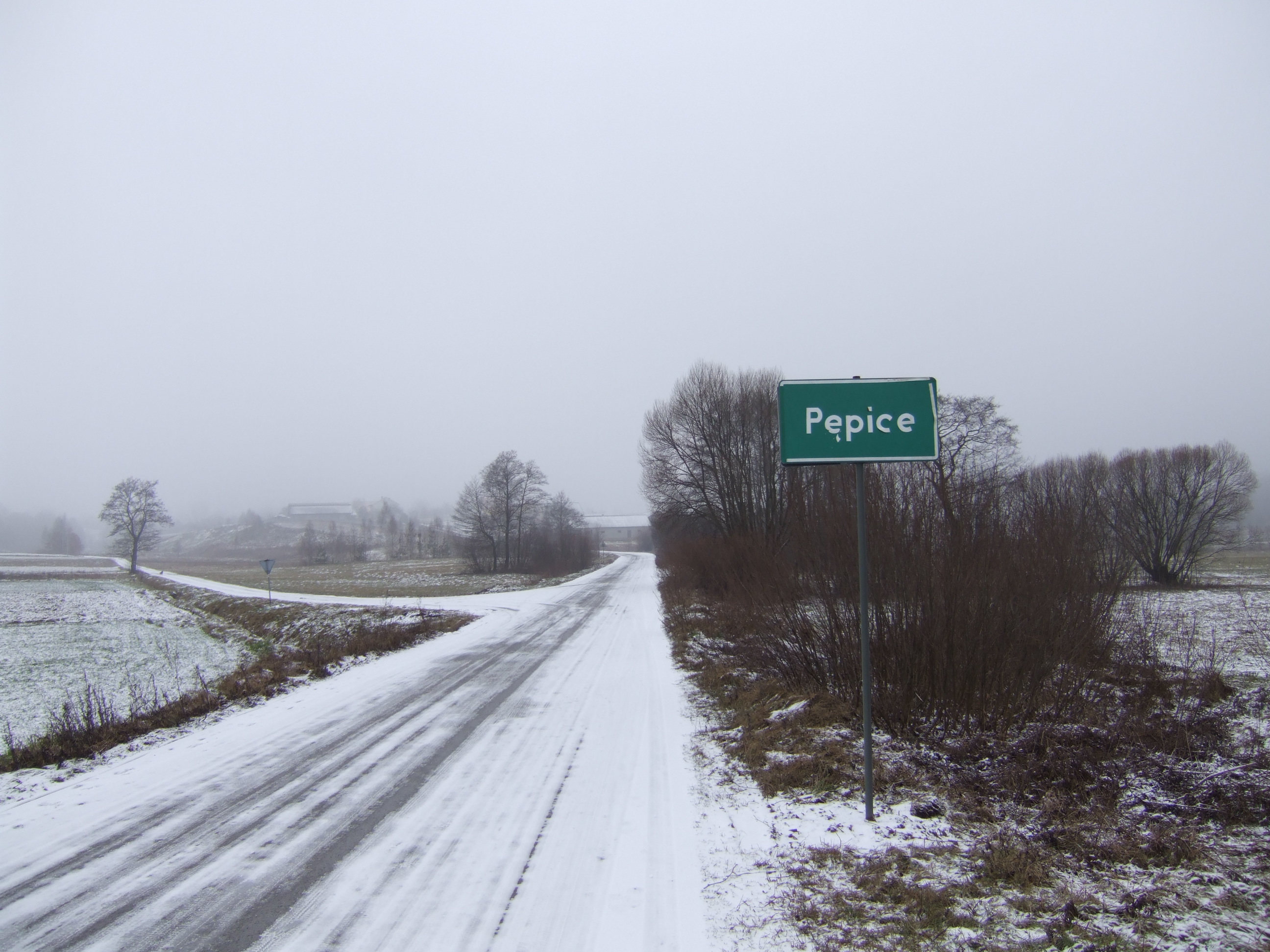

- Location within Poland
- Coordinates: 50°58′1″N 20°30′11″E
- Country: Poland
- Voivodeship: Świętokrzyskie
- County: Kielce
- Gmina: Mniów
- Population: 469

Pępice [pɛmˈpit͡sɛ] is a village in the administrative district of Gmina Mniów, within Kielce County, Świętokrzyskie Voivodeship, in south-central Poland. It lies approximately 6 km (4 mi) south of Mniów and 13 km (8 mi) north-west of the regional capital Kielce.
