= Mokry Bór, Świętokrzyskie Voivodeship =

Mokry Bór
- Village
- Location within Poland
- Coordinates: 50°59′37″N 20°24′46″E
- Country: Poland
- Voivodeship: Świętokrzyskie
- County: Kielce
- Gmina: Mniów
- Population: 53

Mokry Bór (Polish pronunciation: [ˈmɔkrɨ ˈbur]) is a village in the administrative district of Gmina Mniów, within Kielce County, Świętokrzyskie Voivodeship, in south-central Poland. It lies approximately 6 km (4 mi) west of Mniów and 19 km (12 mi) north-west of the regional capital Kielce.
