= Malmurzyn =

- Village
- Location within Poland
- Coordinates: 50°58′42″N 20°27′15″E
- Country: Poland
- Voivodeship: Świętokrzyskie
- County: Kielce
- Gmina: Mniów
- Population: 153

Malmurzyn [malˈmuʐɨn] is a village in the administrative district of Gmina Mniów, within Kielce County, Świętokrzyskie Voivodeship, in south-central Poland. It lies approximately 5 km (3 mi) south-west of Mniów and 16 km (10 mi) north-west of the regional capital Kielce.
