= Stachura =

- Village
- Location within Poland
- Coordinates: 50°59′27″N 20°26′30″E
- Country: Poland
- Voivodeship: Świętokrzyskie
- County: Kielce
- Gmina: Mniów
- Population: 216

Stachura [staˈxura] is a village in the administrative district of Gmina Mniów, within Kielce County, Świętokrzyskie Voivodeship, in south-central Poland. It lies approximately 4 km (2 mi) south-west of Mniów and 18 km (11 mi) north-west of the regional capital Kielce.
