= Przełom =

- Village
- Location within Poland
- Coordinates: 51°1′20″N 20°26′41″E
- Country: Poland
- Voivodeship: Świętokrzyskie
- County: Kielce
- Gmina: Mniów

Population
  - Total: 162
- Time zone: UTC+1 (CET)
  - Summer (DST): UTC+2 (CEST)

Przełom [ˈpʂɛwɔm] is a village in the administrative district of Gmina Mniów, within Kielce County, Świętokrzyskie Voivodeship, in south-central Poland. It lies approximately 4 km (2 mi) west of Mniów and 20 km (12 mi) north-west of the regional capital Kielce.
