= Węgrzynów, Świętokrzyskie Voivodeship =

Węgrzynów
- Village
- Location within Poland
- Coordinates: 51°0′37″N 20°27′34″E
- Country: Poland
- Voivodeship: Świętokrzyskie
- County: Kielce
- Gmina: Mniów
- Population: 587

Węgrzynów [vɛŋˈɡʐɨnuf] is a village in the administrative district of Gmina Mniów, within Kielce County, Świętokrzyskie Voivodeship, in south-central Poland. It lies approximately 2 km (1 mi) west of Mniów and 18 km (11 mi) north-west of the regional capital Kielce.
