= Straszów, Świętokrzyskie Voivodeship =

Straszów
- Village
- Location within Poland
- Coordinates: 51°0′59″N 20°23′10″E
- Country: Poland
- Voivodeship: Świętokrzyskie
- County: Kielce
- Gmina: Mniów
- Population: 305

Straszów [ˈstraʂuf] is a village in the administrative district of Gmina Mniów, within Kielce County, Świętokrzyskie Voivodeship, in south-central Poland. It lies approximately 8 km (5 mi) west of Mniów and 22 km (14 mi) north-west of the regional capital Kielce.
