= Grzymałków =

- Village
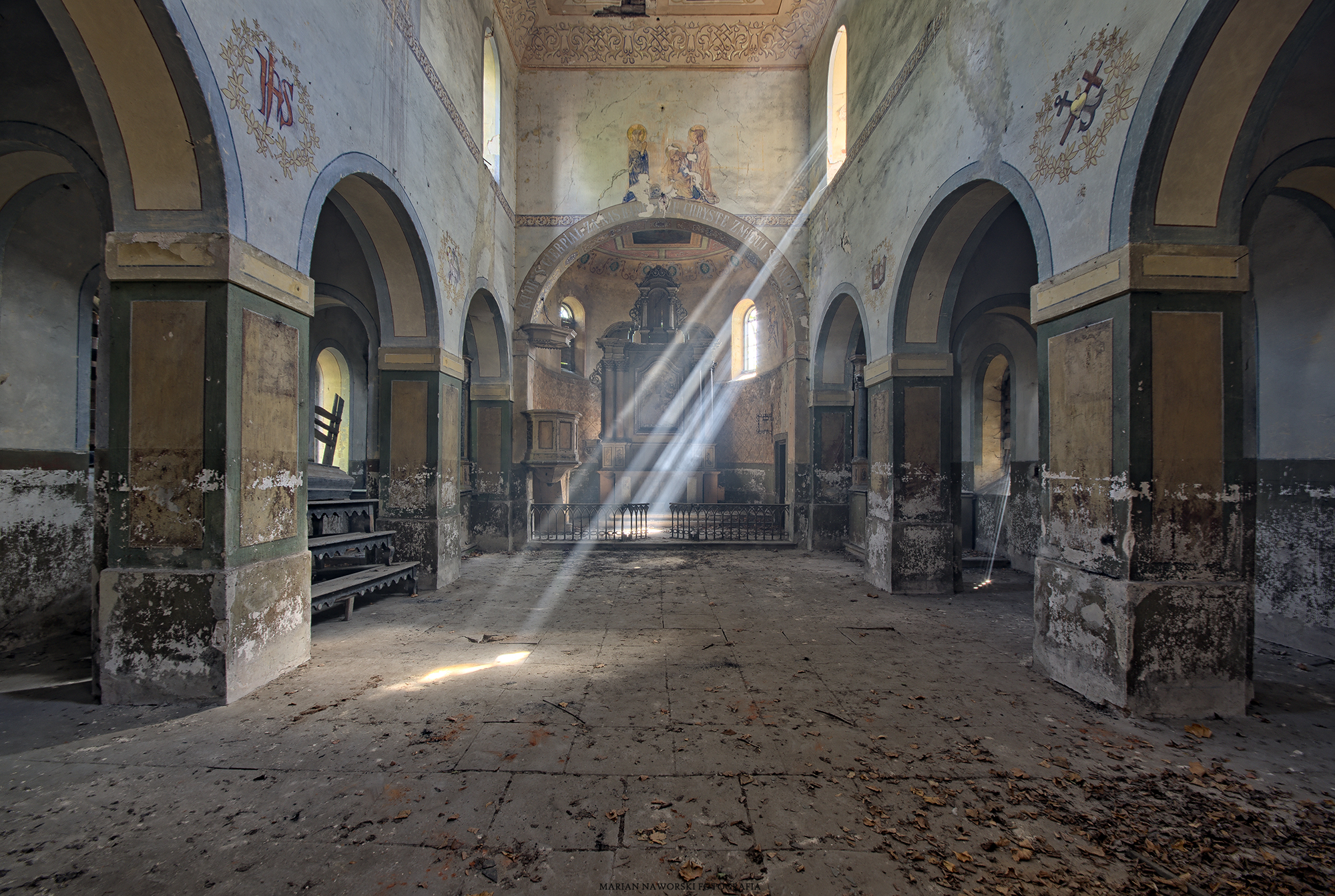
- Abandoned church

- Location within Poland
- Coordinates: 51°0′28″N 20°23′59″E
- Country: Poland
- Voivodeship: Świętokrzyskie
- County: Kielce
- Gmina: Mniów
- Population: 488

Grzymałków [ɡʐɨˈmau̯kuf] is a village in the administrative district of Gmina Mniów, within Kielce County, Świętokrzyskie Voivodeship, in south-central Poland. It lies approximately 7 km (4 mi) west of Mniów and 21 km (13 mi) north-west of the regional capital Kielce.

== History ==
In the 19th century, Grzymałków was described as a village and a farm in the Kielce district, Mniów commune, Grzymałków parish.

According to the 1827 census of towns, villages, and settlements of the Kingdom of Poland, there were 12 houses and 120 inhabitants in Grzmałków. The Grzymałków parish of the Kielce deanery, formerly Szydłowiec, had 2,670 parishioners. The Grzymałków manor was located 4 versts from the post office in Mniów. The dominant area was 368 acres, 253 acres of arable land and gardens, 68 acres of meadows, 34 acres of pastures, and 12 acres of wasteland and squares. There were 6 brick buildings and 1 wooden building. In 1879, this manor was separated from the Wólka Kłucka estate.
