= Skoki (disambiguation) =

Skoki is a town in Greater Poland Voivodeship, west-central Poland.

Skoki may also refer to:

- Skoki, Złotów County in Greater Poland Voivodeship
- Skoki, Puławy County in Lublin Voivodeship (east Poland)
- Skoki, Radzyń County in Lublin Voivodeship (east Poland)
- Skoki, Lubusz Voivodeship (west Poland)
- Skoki, Świętokrzyskie Voivodeship (south-central Poland)
- Skoki, Szczecin, a neighbourhood of Szczecin in West Pomeranian Voivodeship, Poland
- Skoki, Belarus, in the Brest District of Belarus
- Skoki Formation, in Canada

== Note ==
- The name is not related to that of Skokie, Illinois which is of Native American origin.
