= Pielaki, Świętokrzyskie Voivodeship =

Pielaki
- Village
- Location within Poland
- Coordinates: 51°1′41″N 20°28′20″E
- Country: Poland
- Voivodeship: Świętokrzyskie
- County: Kielce
- Gmina: Mniów
- Population: 112

Pielaki [pjɛˈlaki] is a village in the administrative district of Gmina Mniów, within Kielce County, Świętokrzyskie Voivodeship, in south-central Poland. It lies approximately 2 km (1 mi) north-west of Mniów and 19 km (12 mi) north-west of the regional capital Kielce.
