= Cierchy =

- Village
- Location within Poland
- Coordinates: 50°58′41″N 20°28′51″E
- Country: Poland
- Voivodeship: Świętokrzyskie
- County: Kielce
- Gmina: Mniów
- Population: 323

Cierchy [ˈt͡ɕɛrxɨ] is a village in the administrative district of Gmina Mniów, within Kielce County, Świętokrzyskie Voivodeship, in south-central Poland. It lies approximately 4 km (2 mi) south of Mniów and 15 km (9 mi) north-west of the regional capital Kielce.
