= Rogowice =

- Village
- Location within Poland
- Coordinates: 51°2′10″N 20°34′18″E
- Country: Poland
- Voivodeship: Świętokrzyskie
- County: Kielce
- Gmina: Mniów
- Population: 334

Rogowice [rɔɡɔˈvit͡sɛ] is a village in the administrative district of Gmina Mniów, within Kielce County, Świętokrzyskie Voivodeship, in south-central Poland. It lies approximately 7 km (4 mi) north-east of Mniów and 18 km (11 mi) north of the regional capital Kielce.
