= Kontrewers, Świętokrzyskie Voivodeship =

Kontrewers
- Village
- Location within Poland
- Coordinates: 51°3′6″N 20°30′43″E
- Country: Poland
- Voivodeship: Świętokrzyskie
- County: Kielce
- Gmina: Mniów
- Population: 61

Kontrewers [kɔnˈtrɛvɛrs] is a village in the administrative district of Gmina Mniów, within Kielce County, Świętokrzyskie Voivodeship, in south-central Poland. It lies approximately 5 km (3 mi) north of Mniów and 21 km (13 mi) north of the regional capital Kielce.
