= Chyby, Świętokrzyskie Voivodeship =

Chyby
- Village
- Location within Poland
- Coordinates: 51°2′25″N 20°30′31″E
- Country: Poland
- Voivodeship: Świętokrzyskie
- County: Kielce
- Gmina: Mniów
- Population: 145

Chyby [ˈxɨbɨ] is a village in the administrative district of Gmina Mniów, within Kielce County, Świętokrzyskie Voivodeship, in south-central Poland. It lies approximately 4 km (2 mi) north-east of Mniów and 19 km (12 mi) north-west of the regional capital Kielce.
