= Baran, Świętokrzyskie Voivodeship =

Baran
- Village
- Location within Poland
- Coordinates: 51°2′44″N 20°29′26″E
- Country: Poland
- Voivodeship: Świętokrzyskie
- County: Kielce
- Gmina: Mniów
- Population: 89

Baran [ˈbaran] is a village in the administrative district of Gmina Mniów, within Kielce County, Świętokrzyskie Voivodeship, in south-central Poland. It lies approximately 4 km (2 mi) north of Mniów and 21 km (13 mi) north-west of the regional capital Kielce.
