= Borki, Kielce County =

Borki
- Village
- Location within Poland
- Coordinates: 51°0′35″N 20°25′8″E
- Country: Poland
- Voivodeship: Świętokrzyskie
- County: Kielce
- Gmina: Mniów
- Population: 620

Borki [ˈbɔrki] is a village in the administrative district of Gmina Mniów, within Kielce County, Świętokrzyskie Voivodeship, in south-central Poland. It lies approximately 5 km (3 mi) west of Mniów and 20 km (12 mi) north-west of the regional capital Kielce.
