= Pustyny =

- Village
- Location within Poland
- Coordinates: 49°39′31″N 21°50′2″E
- Country: Poland
- Voivodeship: Subcarpathian
- County: Krosno
- Gmina: Krościenko Wyżne
- Elevation: 292 m (958 ft)
- Population: 1,057

Pustyny [pusˈtɨnɨ] is a village in the administrative district of Gmina Krościenko Wyżne, within Krosno County, Subcarpathian Voivodeship, in south-eastern Poland.
