= Gmina Krościenko Wyżne =

Gmina Krościenko Wyżne Krościenko Wyżne Commune
- Gmina
- Flag Coat of arms
- Interactive map of Gmina Krościenko Wyżne
- Coordinates (Krościenko Wyżne): 49°40′52″N 21°49′1″E
- Country: Poland
- Voivodeship: Subcarpathian
- County: Krosno County
- Seat: Krościenko Wyżne

Area
  - Total: 16.33 km^{2} (6.31 sq mi)

Population (2006)
  - Total: 5,179
  - Density: 317.1/km^{2} (821.4/sq mi)
- Website: https://www.kroscienkowyzne.pl/

Gmina Krościenko Wyżne is a rural gmina (administrative district) in Krosno County, Subcarpathian Voivodeship, in south-eastern Poland. Its seat is the village of Krościenko Wyżne, which lies approximately 5 kilometres (3 mi) east of Krosno and 42 km (26 mi) south of the regional capital Rzeszów.

The gmina covers an area of 16.33 square kilometres (6.31 sq mi), and as of 2006 its total population is 5,179.

== Villages ==
The gmina contains the villages (sołectwos) of Krościenko Wyżne and Pustyny.

== Neighbouring gminas ==
Gmina Krościenko Wyżne is bordered by the city of Krosno and by the gminas of Haczów, Korczyna and Miejsce Piastowe.
