= Zachybie =

- Village
- Location within Poland
- Coordinates: 51°01′04″N 20°25′49″E
- Country: Poland
- Voivodeship: Świętokrzyskie
- County: Kielce
- Gmina: Mniów
- Population: 90

Zachybie [zaˈxɨbjɛ] is a village in the administrative district of Gmina Mniów, within Kielce County, Świętokrzyskie Voivodeship, in south-central Poland.
