= Piaski, Kielce County =

Piaski
- Village
- Location within Poland
- Coordinates: 50°59′04″N 20°27′10″E
- Country: Poland
- Voivodeship: Świętokrzyskie
- County: Kielce
- Gmina: Mniów
- Population: 103

Piaski (Polish pronunciation: [ˈpjaskʲi]) is a village in the administrative district of Gmina Mniów, within Kielce County, Świętokrzyskie Voivodeship, in south-central Poland.
