= Skoki, Świętokrzyskie Voivodeship =

Skoki
- Village
- Location within Poland
- Coordinates: 50°59′54″N 20°24′4″E
- Country: Poland
- Voivodeship: Świętokrzyskie
- County: Kielce
- Gmina: Mniów
- Population: 370

Skoki [ˈskɔki] is a village in the administrative district of Gmina Mniów, within Kielce County, Świętokrzyskie Voivodeship, in south-central Poland. It lies approximately 7 km (4 mi) west of Mniów and 20 km (12 mi) north-west of the regional capital Kielce.

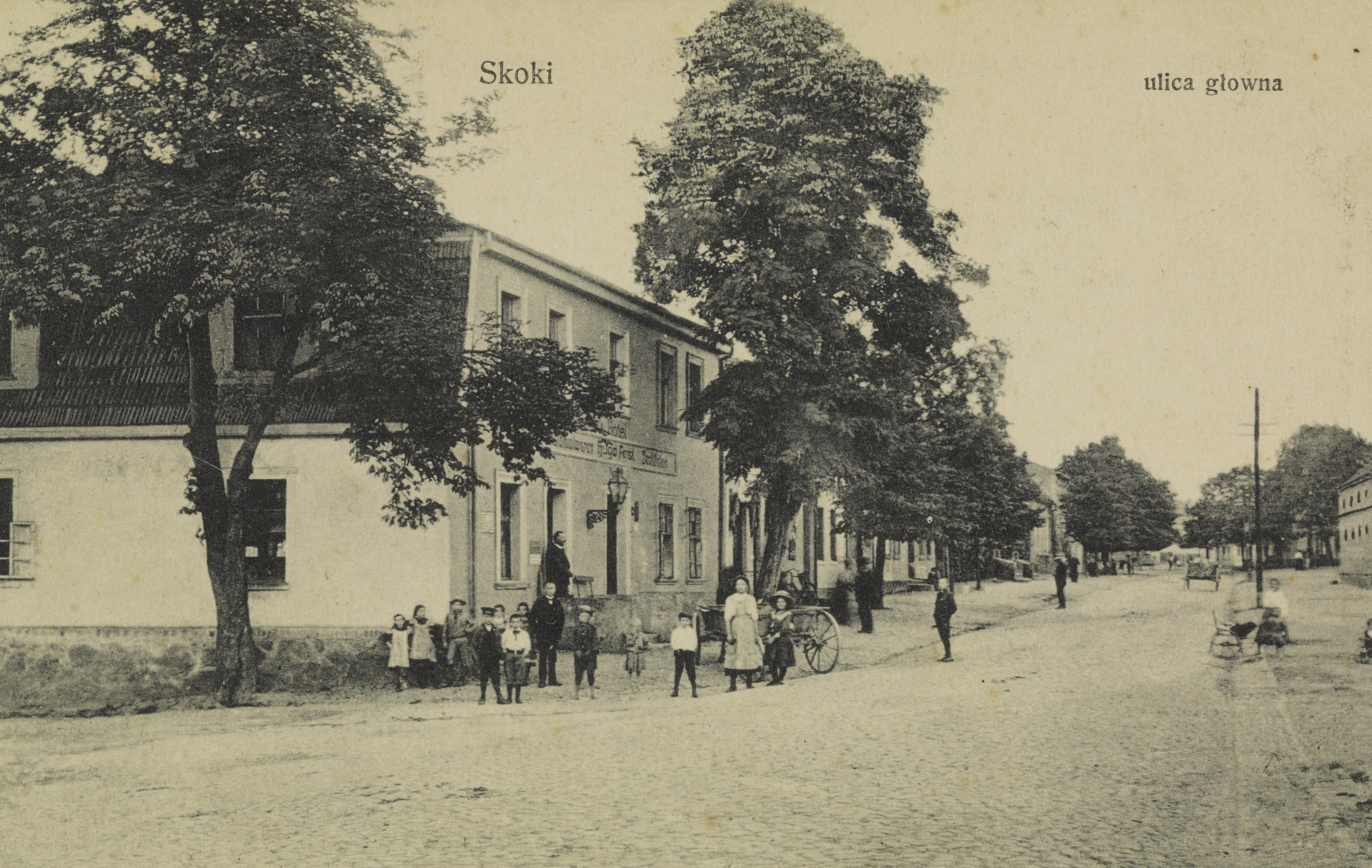
Main street, 1906-1935
