= Sośnina, Świętokrzyskie Voivodeship =

Sośnina
- Village
- Location within Poland
- Coordinates: 51°01′21″N 20°23′25″E
- Country: Poland
- Voivodeship: Świętokrzyskie
- County: Kielce
- Gmina: Mniów
- Population: 33

Sośnina [sɔɕˈnina] is a village in the administrative district of Gmina Mniów, within Kielce County, Świętokrzyskie Voivodeship, in south-central Poland.
