= Church of Our Lady of Perpetual Help, Tarnobrzeg =

Church in Serbinów, Poland

Coordinates: 50.5791°N 21.6845°E

Church of Our Lady of Perpetual Help in Tarnobrzeg
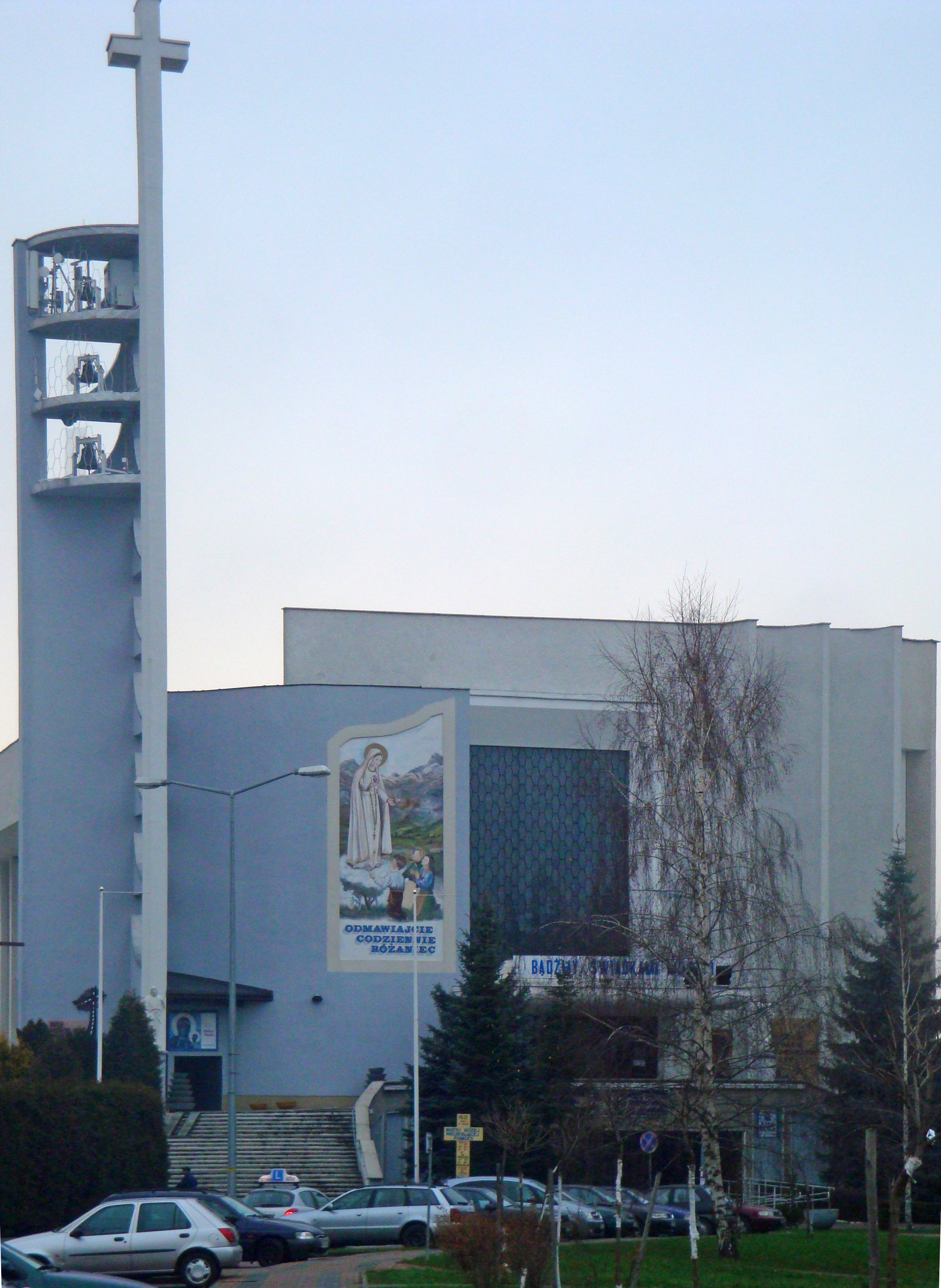
- View from the side of the Konstytucji 3 Maja Street

Religion
- Affiliation: Roman Catholic
- Diocese: Serbinów
- Province: Subcarpathian Voivodeship / Roman Catholic Diocese of Sandomierz
- Rite: Latin Rite
- Year consecrated: 2004
- Status: main building of Serbinow parish of Our Lady of Perpetual Help in Tarnobrzeg

Location
- Location: Poland
- Municipality: Tarnobrzeg
- Interactive map of Church of Our Lady of Perpetual Help in Tarnobrzeg

Architecture
- Architect: Gerard Pająk
- Type: Church
- Style: Functionalism
- General contractor: Zbigniew Żuchowicz
- Groundbreaking: 1981
- Completed: 1984

Website
- Official website

Church of Our Lady of Perpetual Help in Tarnobrzeg (Polish: Kościół Matki Bożej Nieustającej Pomocy w Tarnobrzegu) is a church in Serbinów, Poland.

The church consists of the upper, bottom church and buildings adjoining to them. The altar of the upper church consists of three parts: saint Michael the Archangel, the Cross, and the Mother of God of the Incessant Help. The whole is carried out in the form of mosaic. Demons attacking people are in a left hand of the altar. At the end of the first part of the altar crowds of people are becoming waves. The Archangel is separating them and with walking stick is reproving in the direction of the Cross and the Mother of God. In part centre a huge crucifix is found. There are no specific ideas of people or demons, but a symbolism of waves was kept. Individual persons are turning up at the right part of the altar - already as praying and adoring God, with crosses in the hand. A side altar of the Merciful Jesus kept the similar style of mosaic. The left, side nave is filled up with four stained glass referring to evangelical acts of the mercy. Low relieves are in right, side naves Polish saint. A very large choir is in an upper church. The building was being built in the 1980s, when the Polish Catholic Church thought that he would fail to obtain the new permission from communist authorities to the new temple. Tarnobrzeg was very quickly developed, and civil authorities were counting, that in the year 2000 the number of inhabitants will exceed 100,000. It extorted construction of the huge church, being able to hold a few thousand people. Provost of the parish is prelate Michał Józefczyk.

== Bottom church ==
The bottom church is much smaller. A brass low relief of the Last Supper is a main element of the altar. At present also Chapel of The Adoration of The Holy Sacrament is located in it with the mosaic altar.

== Building complex ==
On the area there are also buildings donated to the Congregation Of Sisters Służebniczki are finding and to the priests servicing in the parish. Other buildings are: the church hall, religious education small rooms, the chemist, the kindergarten/orphanage and the hospice. At entering the church figures of four Evangelists were placed. On the facade a huge mural of Our Lady of Fatima was painted.

== Relics ==
Relics were integrated into the main altar of the upper church following saint:

- Edmund Bojanowski
- Jan Bosko
- Albert Chmielowski
- Zygmunt Gorazdowski
- Mother Teresa
- Faustyna Kowalska
- Gianna Beretta Molla
- Padre Pio
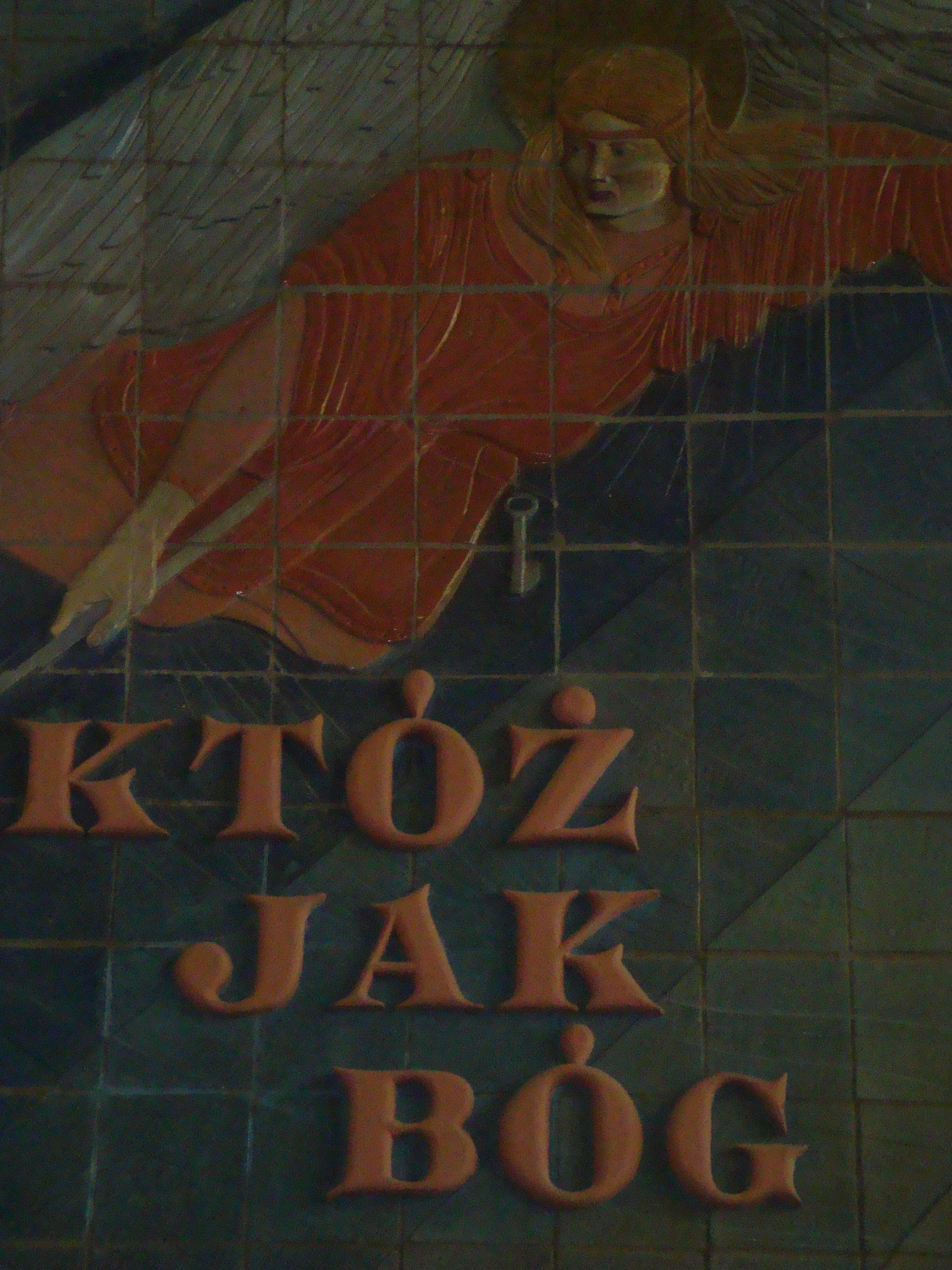
Archangel Michael - left part of the altar

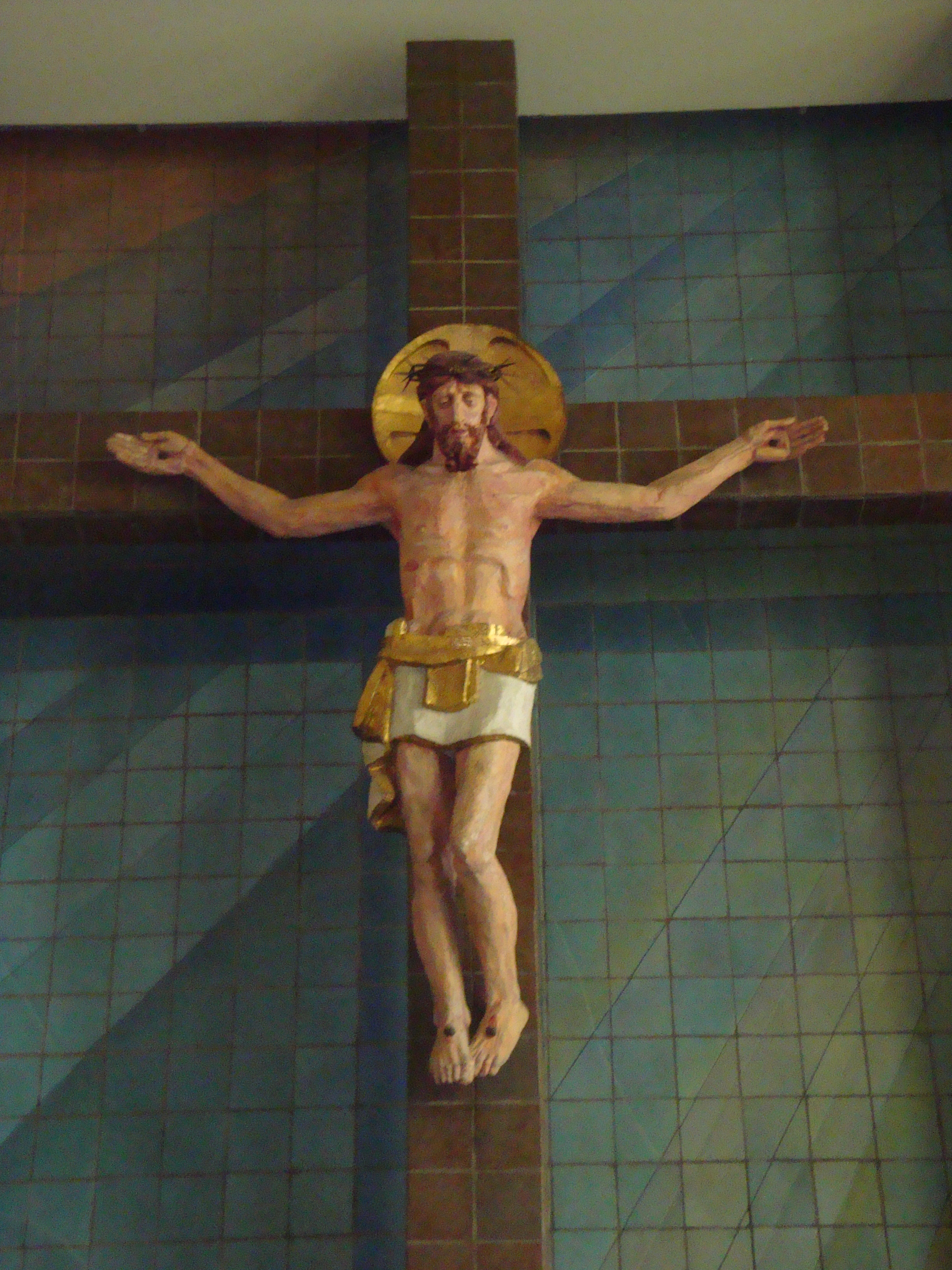
Crucifix - Central point of the altar

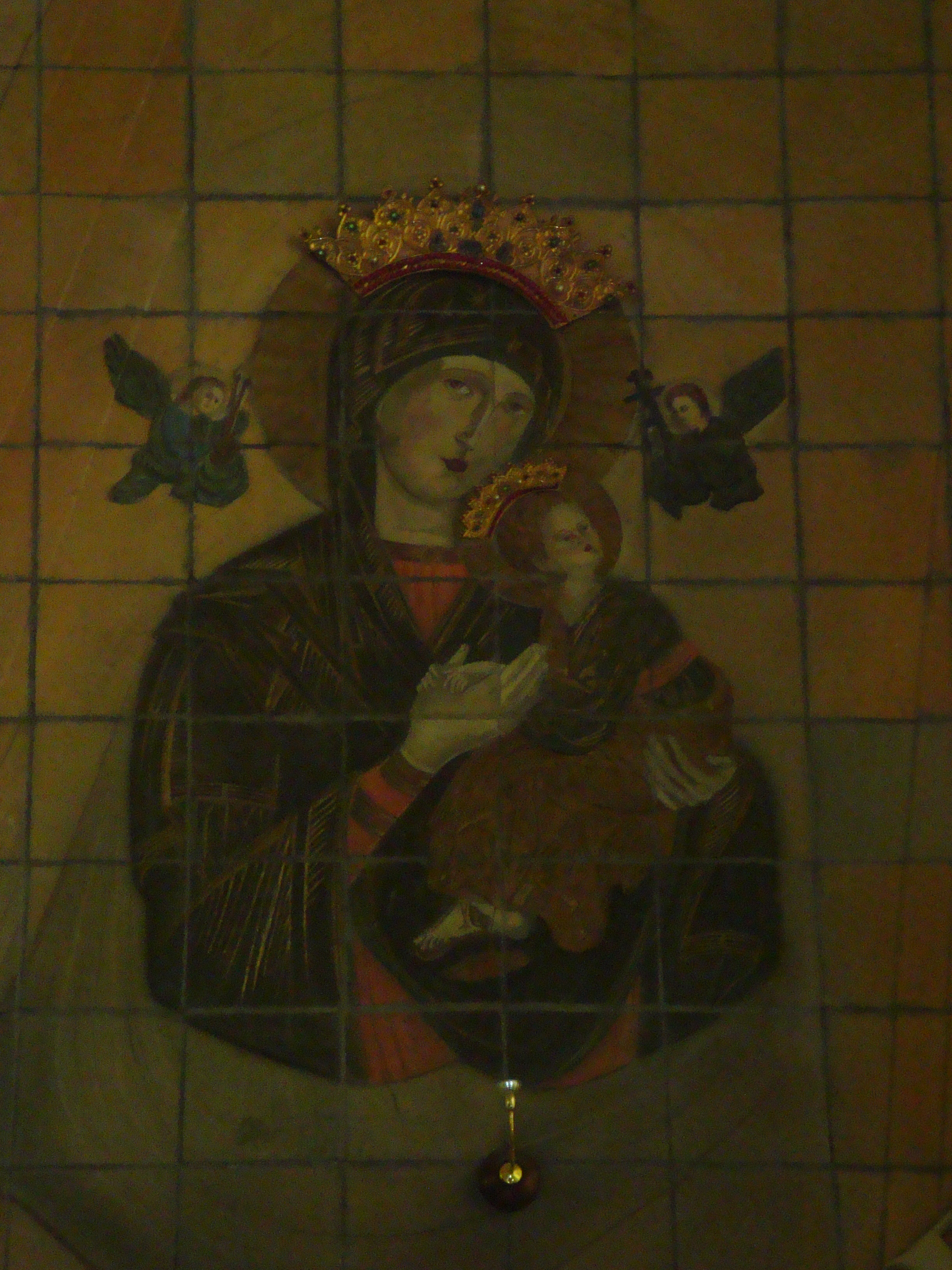
Patron of the parish - right part of the altar

== Belfry ==
Bells are on a belfry: Maria, Michał, Maksymilian. For the first time they rang on 25 March 1984.

== Stained glass ==
Into so much church a huge window was left so that the temple was bright. In the 90s, with the objective of protection of organ pipes the window was covered with stained glass. Several years' works were finished in 1997 r. In it history was described beautiful image/icons of the Mother of God of the Incessant Help. Maciej Kauczyński is the initiator of the scheme. Workmanship Studios of stained glass - Krzysztof Packet, Andrzej Cwilewicz.

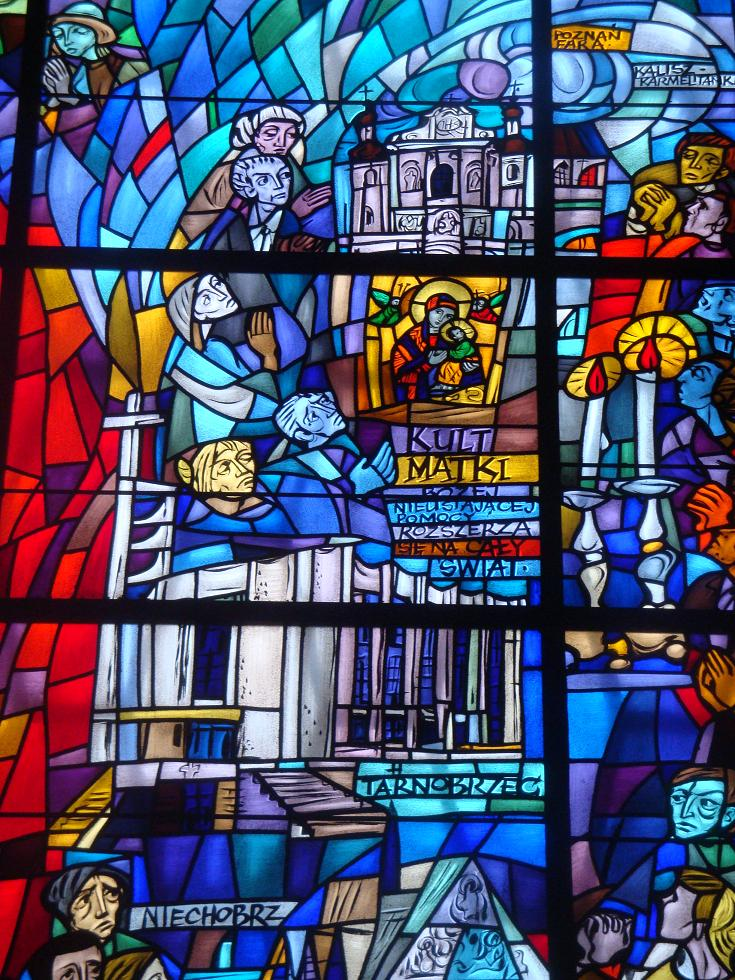
Worship of the Mother of God in Tarnobrzeg

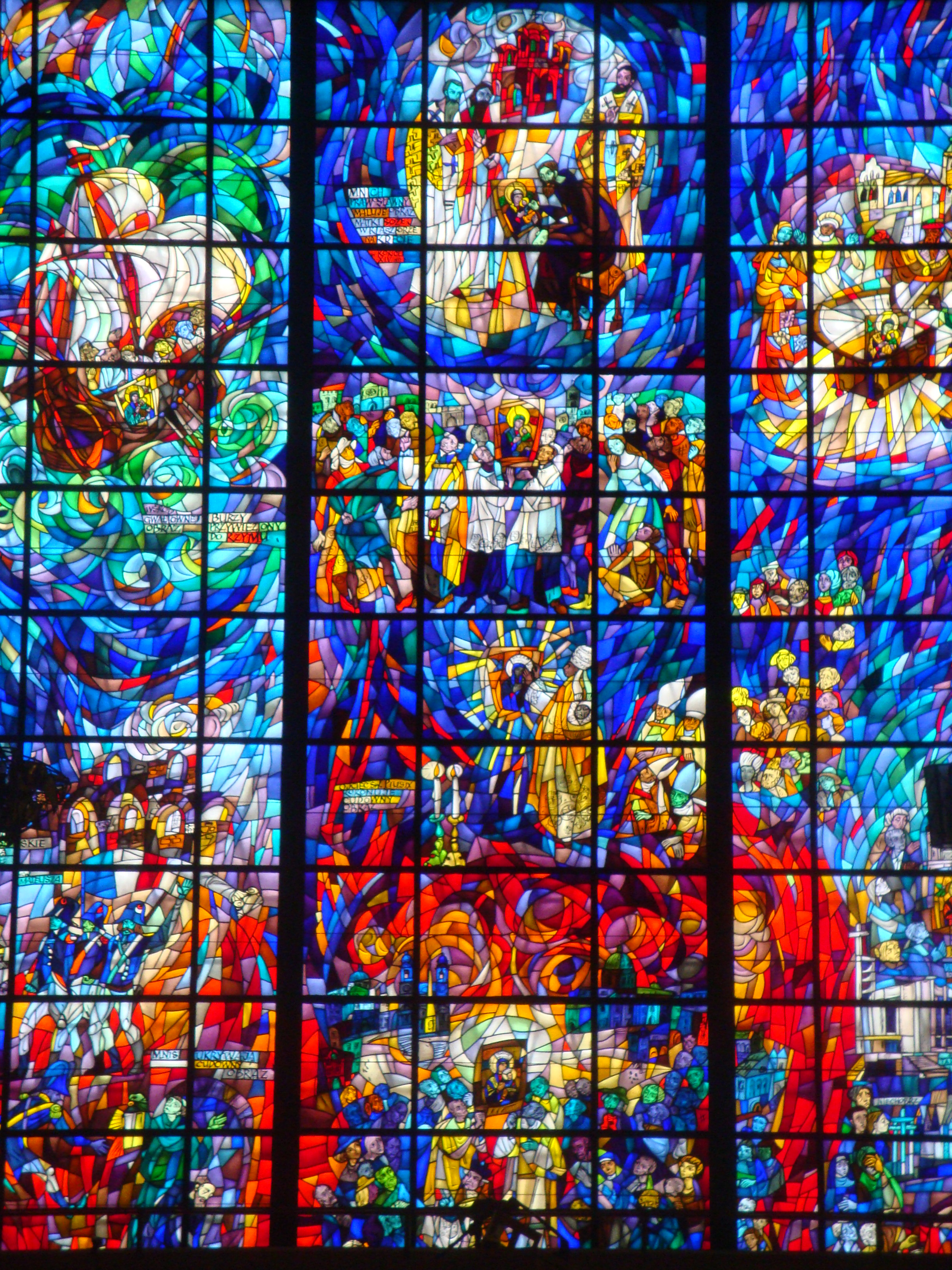
Stained glass in the back of the church. History of the image/icon of the Mother of God of the Incessant Help

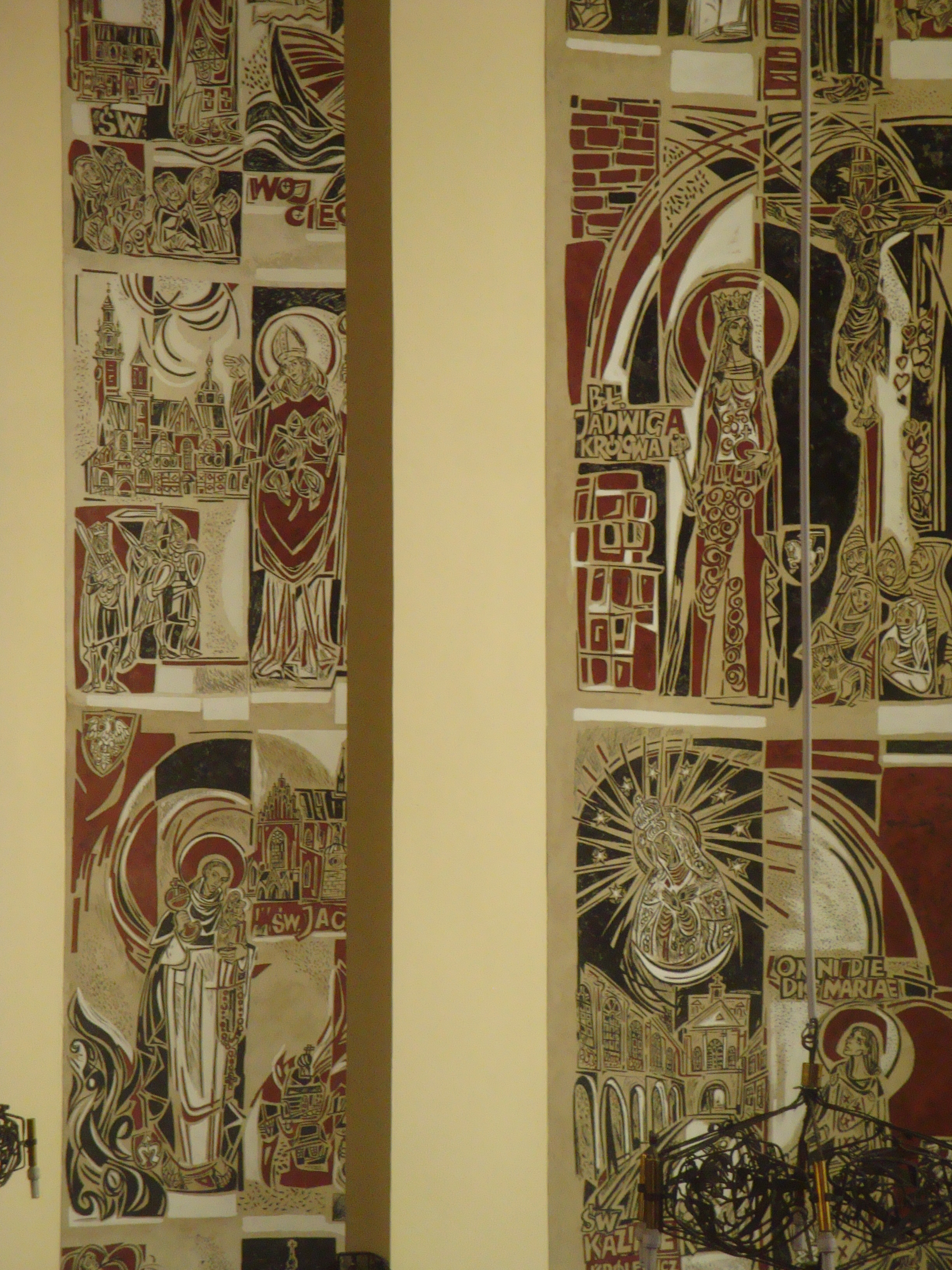
Right part of the church - Polish Saints

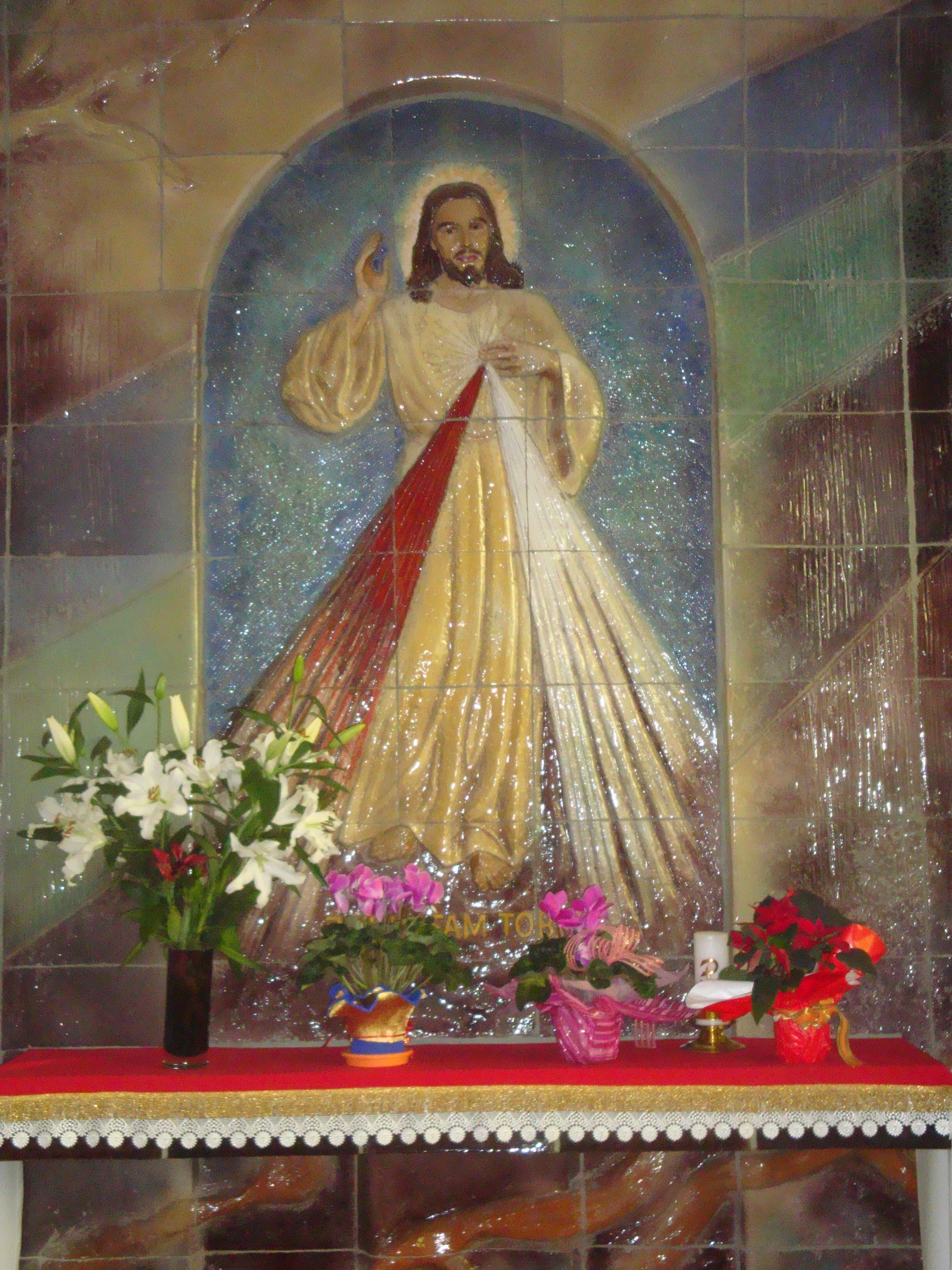
Left part of the church - Merciful Jesus

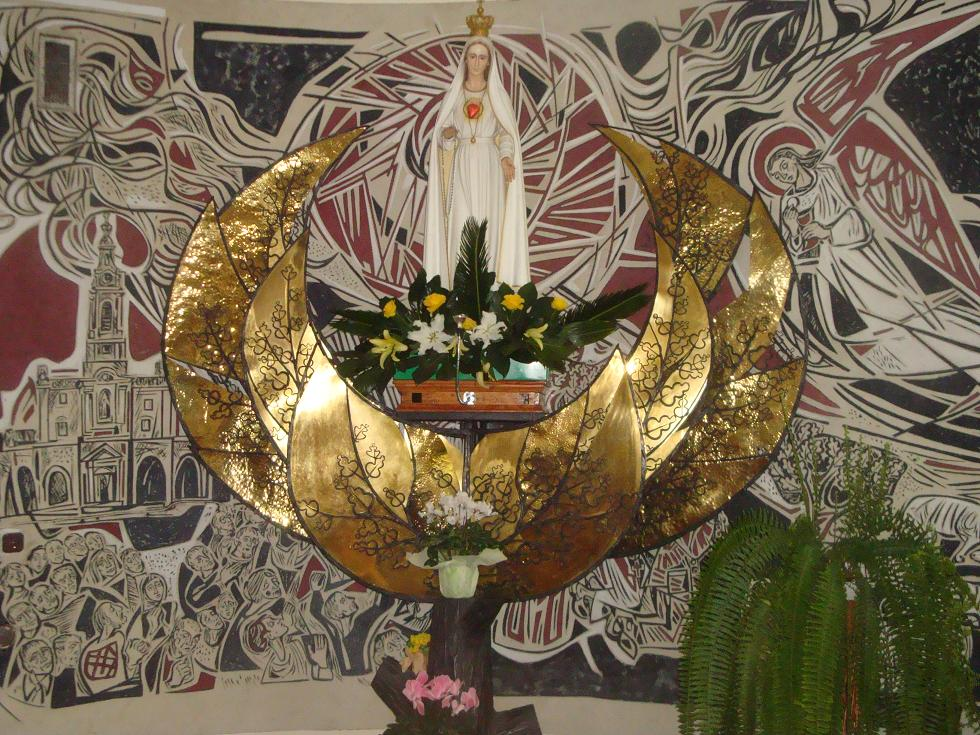
Figure of the Mother of God of Fatima. In the course of the Service of Fatima she is taken out and processional carried around the entire housing estate.

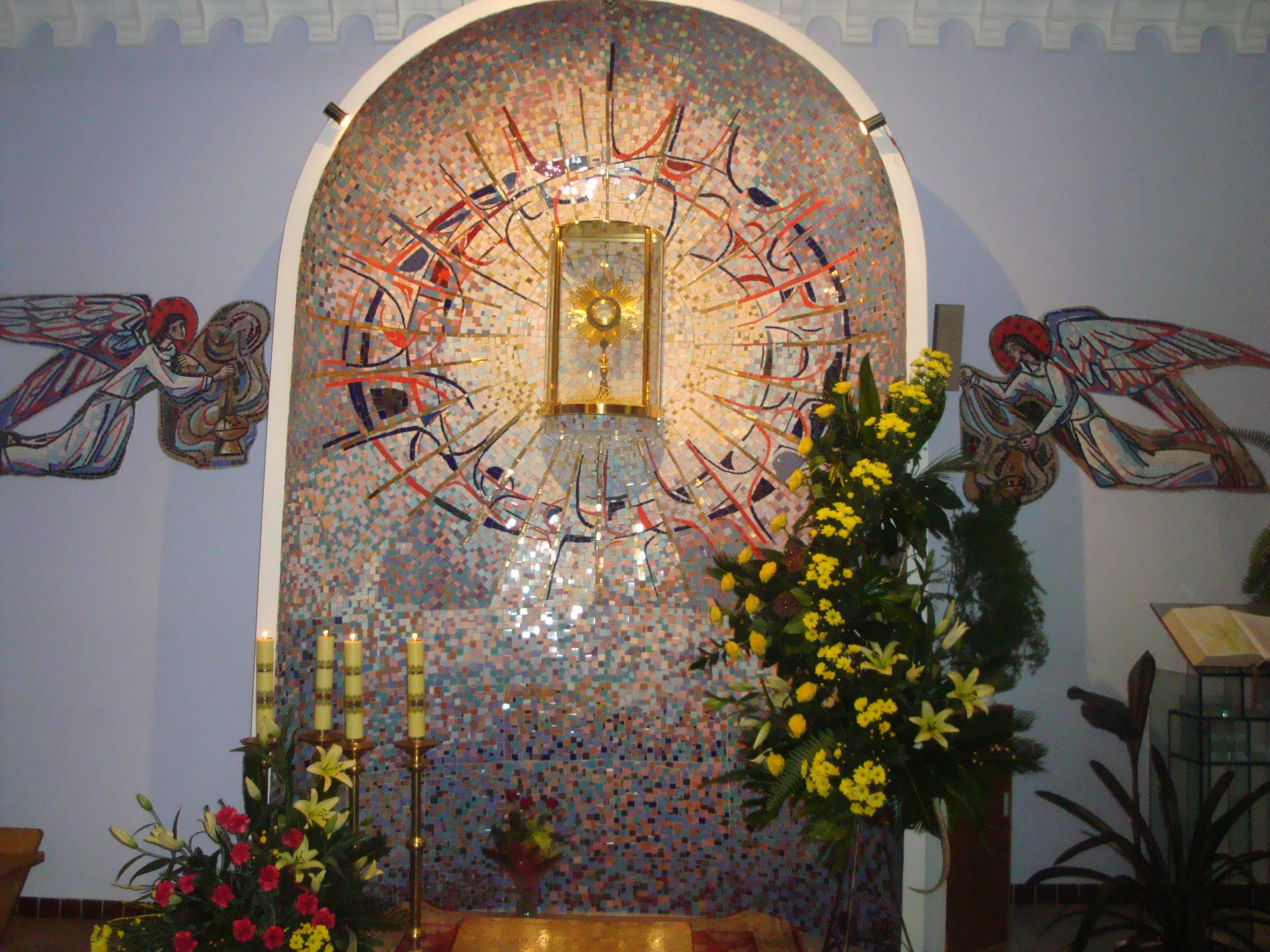
Bottom church - Chapel of Perpetual Adoration

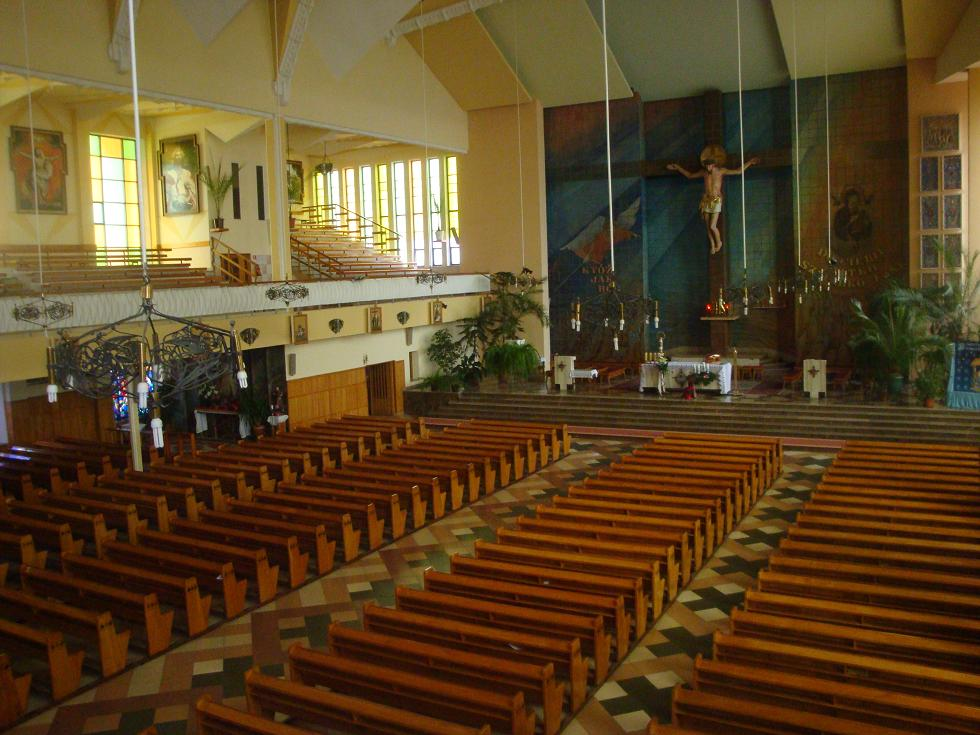
View on the church from the choir

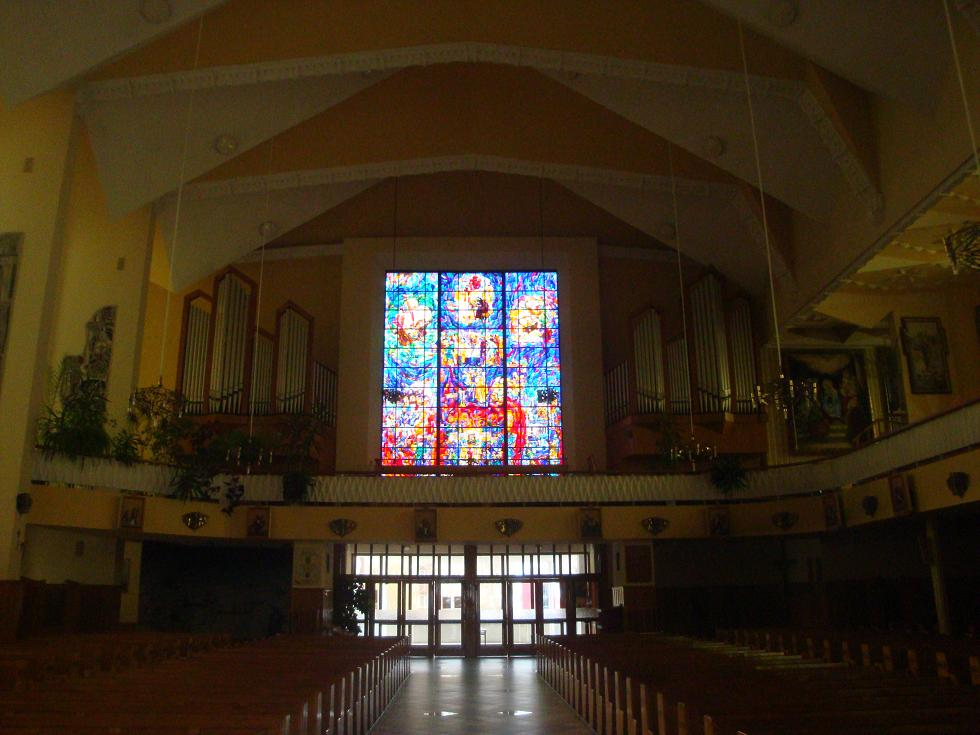
View on the back of the church, organs, stained glass.

== See also ==
- Parish of Our Lady of Perpetual Help in Tarnobrzeg
- Dzikovia Castle in Tarnobrzeg - around 1 km from the church
