= Gliniany Las =

- Village
- Location within Poland
- Coordinates: 51°01′33″N 20°24′17″E
- Country: Poland
- Voivodeship: Świętokrzyskie
- County: Kielce
- Gmina: Mniów
- Population: 115

Gliniany Las [ɡliˈɲanɨ ˈlas] is a village in the administrative district of Gmina Mniów, within Kielce County, Świętokrzyskie Voivodeship, in south-central Poland.

The village has a population of 115.
