= Parish of Our Lady of Perpetual Help, Tarnobrzeg =

Roman Catholic parish in Tarnobrzeg, Poland

Coordinates: 50.5793°N 21.6845°E

The Parish of Our Lady of Perpetual Help in Tarnobrzeg-Serbinów is a Roman Catholic parish belonging to the Diocese of Sandomierz, within the Tarnobrzeg Deanery, located in the Serbinów district of Tarnobrzeg, Poland.

The parish covers the districts of Bogdanówka, Piastów, Wymysłów, Borów, and Zwierzyniec. Its main church is the Church of Our Lady of Perpetual Help in Tarnobrzeg.

As of 2016, the number of parishioners exceeded 14,000.

On 14 December 1994, the parish joined the Movement for a Better World, leading its clergy to implement pastoral duties under the "New Image of the Parish" programme.

== History ==
In the second half of the 1970s, due to the development of a sulphur mine, a new district called Serbinów was built in Tarnobrzeg. At that time, Tarnobrzeg had only one parish, the Dominican parish. On 8 May 1979, Bishop Ignacy Tokarczuk assigned Father Michał Józefczyk to the emerging Serbinów district to establish a pastoral centre. The land in Serbinów for the new church was purchased from Jan Szczytyński (though diocesan records cite Kazimierz Szczytyński). Building materials and a wooden structure were provided by parishioners from Lipnica. On 26 May 1979, a temporary wooden church was assembled and consecrated the next day, 27 May 1979, by Bishop Ignacy Tokarczuk.

On 24 June 1980, Bishop Ignacy Tokarczuk issued a decree establishing the parish, carved out from the territory of the Dominican parish.

Despite repression in the late 1970s and early 1980s, efforts continued to build a brick church. On an unspecified date in 1979, the first Fatima devotion was held.

Construction approval was granted in 1981 (though diocesan records state April 1982). On 24 June 1981, construction began based on a design by architect Gerard Pająk. On an unspecified date in November 1982, the cornerstone, sourced from the St. Peter's Basilica in Rome and the Sanctuary of Our Lady of Lourdes, was laid.

From 12 December 1983, the parish served as the seat of the Tarnobrzeg-North Deanery in the Archdiocese of Przemyśl for six years. It lost this status after the establishment of the Parish of St. Barbara.

In 1987, the temporary wooden church was dismantled and moved to the Parish of St. Barbara, and on 26 June 1988, Bishop Ignacy Tokarczuk consecrated the new church. On 25 March 1992, by the papal bull Totus Tuus Poloniae Populus, the parish was assigned to the Diocese of Sandomierz. On 14 December 1994, the parish was divided into seven regions. In 1997, due to the city's growth, the Parish of Divine Mercy was separated from it. On 23 May 2004, Bishop Andrzej Dzięga consecrated the church.

== Parish territory ==
The parish encompasses the districts of Bogdanówka, Piastów, Wymysłów, Borów, and Zwierzyniec.

It includes 32 streets: Akacjowa, Bolesław Chrobry, Bolesław Prus, Bolesław Śmiały, Borów, Brzozowa, Bukowa, Dąbrówki, Dębowa, Dr. Michał Marczak, Eliza Orzeszkowa, Eugeniusz Kwiatkowski, Fabryczna, Grabowa, Henryk Sienkiewicz, Jan Matejko, Jaworowa, Jędrusiów, Kasztanowa, Klonowa, Konfederacji Dzikowskiej, Konstytucji 3 Maja, Królowej Jadwigi, Maria Dąbrowska, Modrzewiowa, Prof. Stanisław Tarnowski, Sandomierska (from number 68), Sztygarów, Topolowa, Władysław Łokietek, Wojciech Kossak, Zwierzyniecka.

== Branches, chapels, and shrines ==
In 1996, the parish operated a filial church in Dzików. After the establishment of the Parish of Divine Mercy in 1997, its status changed to a parish church. Since 2009, the Chapel of All Saints at the Sobów Communal Cemetery has hosted masses. The chapel has a 400-square-metre underground area.

The Borów district contains three shrines: two in Zwierzyniec Forest (including the historic St. Onuphrius shrine) and one on Litewska Street. Single shrines are located on Sandomierska and Królowej Jadwigi streets. Sienkiewicz Street hosts four shrines (including one from 1752 and one private).

=== Convent ===
From 1979 to 2017, the parish housed a convent of the sisters from the Congregation of the Sisters Servants of the Immaculate Virgin Mary, part of the Old Village Servants federation.

=== Other places of worship ===
The parish territory includes nine wayside crosses (one 19th-century stone cross in the park by the Dzików Castle and one on a tree on Litewska Street), four figurines (two at the hospice), and monuments: one for unborn children, Jerzy Popiełuszko, Pope John Paul II, Sacred Heart, and Risen Jesus Christ.

== Parish groups ==
The parish hosts three religious confraternities: the Holy Scapular, St. Joseph, and Perpetual Adoration, along with 48 parish communities (as of 2016), including three clubs, three oases, and two groups for the sick (parish and youth).

== Parish pastoral care ==
=== "New Image of the Parish" programme ===
On 14 December 1994, the parish joined the Movement for a Better World, adopting the "New Image of the Parish" pastoral programme to deepen the spiritual life of the community and engage parishioners in social work. This led to the creation of various communities and socio-cultural initiatives. Since 1988, the parish has operated a Family Counselling Centre for Engaged Couples and Marriages; since 2003, a Catholic Volunteer Centre involving high school youth. Since 1993, the "Women Facing Family Alcohol Violence" association has run an environmental and therapeutic day centre for children and youth (30 places) and a Consultation Point for Women Affected by Violence and Alcoholism, collaborating with the parish AA and AL-ANON group, the Tarnobrzeg food bank, and the State Agency for Solving Alcohol Problems in Warsaw. The parish also supports: a family children's home, a free medicine pharmacy, a shelter for the homeless (50 beds), a parish library, the Large Families Association, a Caritas station, and clubs including Catholic Action, the Catholic Families Association, Honorary Blood Donors, the Dwunastka Theatre Group, the Wspólnota Parish Sports Club, a Youth Folk Dance Group, the Lasowiacy and Dzikowianie song and dance ensembles, a brass band, and more. Since 2009, the parish has operated a baby hatch.

Since 1996, a home hospice operated within the parish. On 4 January 2001, the St. Pio Hospice (10 beds) was established near the church. It was expanded on 23 September 2002 with a branch on Dąbrówki Street (30 beds), including a psychiatric unit.

=== Education ===
The parish operates the Nazareth Non-Public Nursery and a kindergarten, which began as the St. Joseph Non-Public Kindergarten in September 1985, run by the Old Village Servants. Since September 2011, it has operated as the St. Joseph Catholic Kindergarten in Tarnobrzeg across two buildings.

On 16 October 2007, the Blessed Edmund Bojanowski Catholic Education Association was founded by Father Michał Józefczyk and Janusz Czapla, its chairman, to support the parish in establishing the John Paul II Catholic School Complex. On 15 September 2008, a primary school and gymnasium opened, followed by a high school in the gymnasium building in September 2012. These institutions are managed by the parish.

=== Parish media ===
The parish publishes the monthly Serbinowskie Dzwony (since 1992, circulation 250 copies), the weekly Nieustająca Pomoc with liturgical schedules and announcements, and the irregular Otwarte Serca newsletter of the Movement for a Better World. The church's image and sound are broadcast 24/7 via Tarnobrzeg's cable network and online at the Serbinów Parish website. Since 2015, the Katolicka Telewizja Serbinów channel has been supported by the "Catholic Television Serbinów" association.

== Gallery ==
Church and chapels
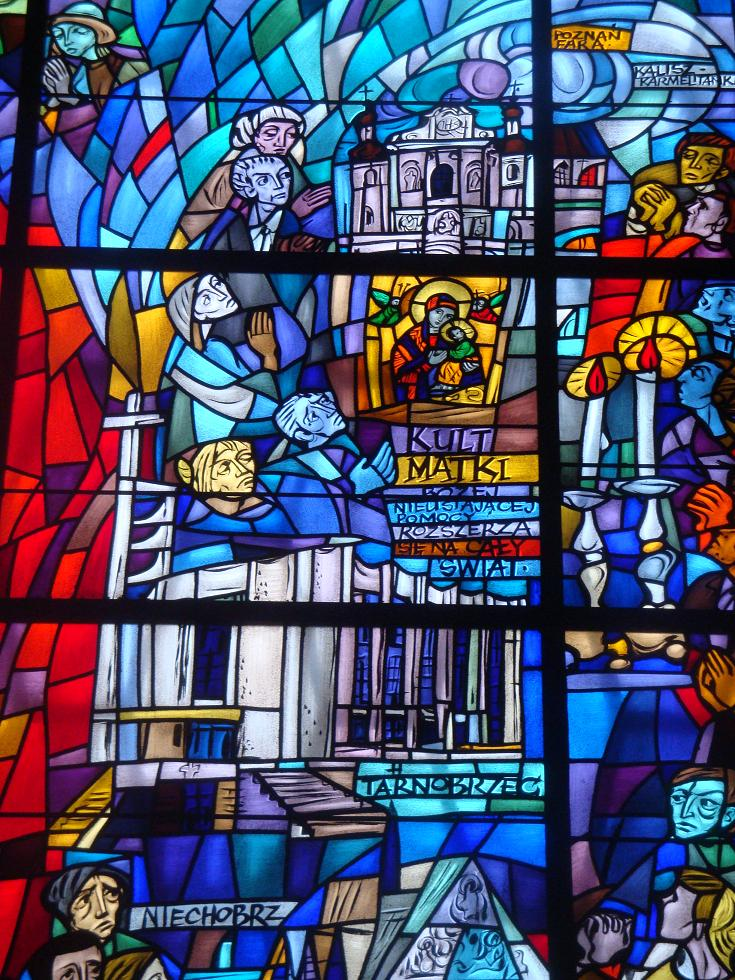
Fragment of a stained glass window referencing the cult of Our Lady of Perpetual Help (rear part of the church)

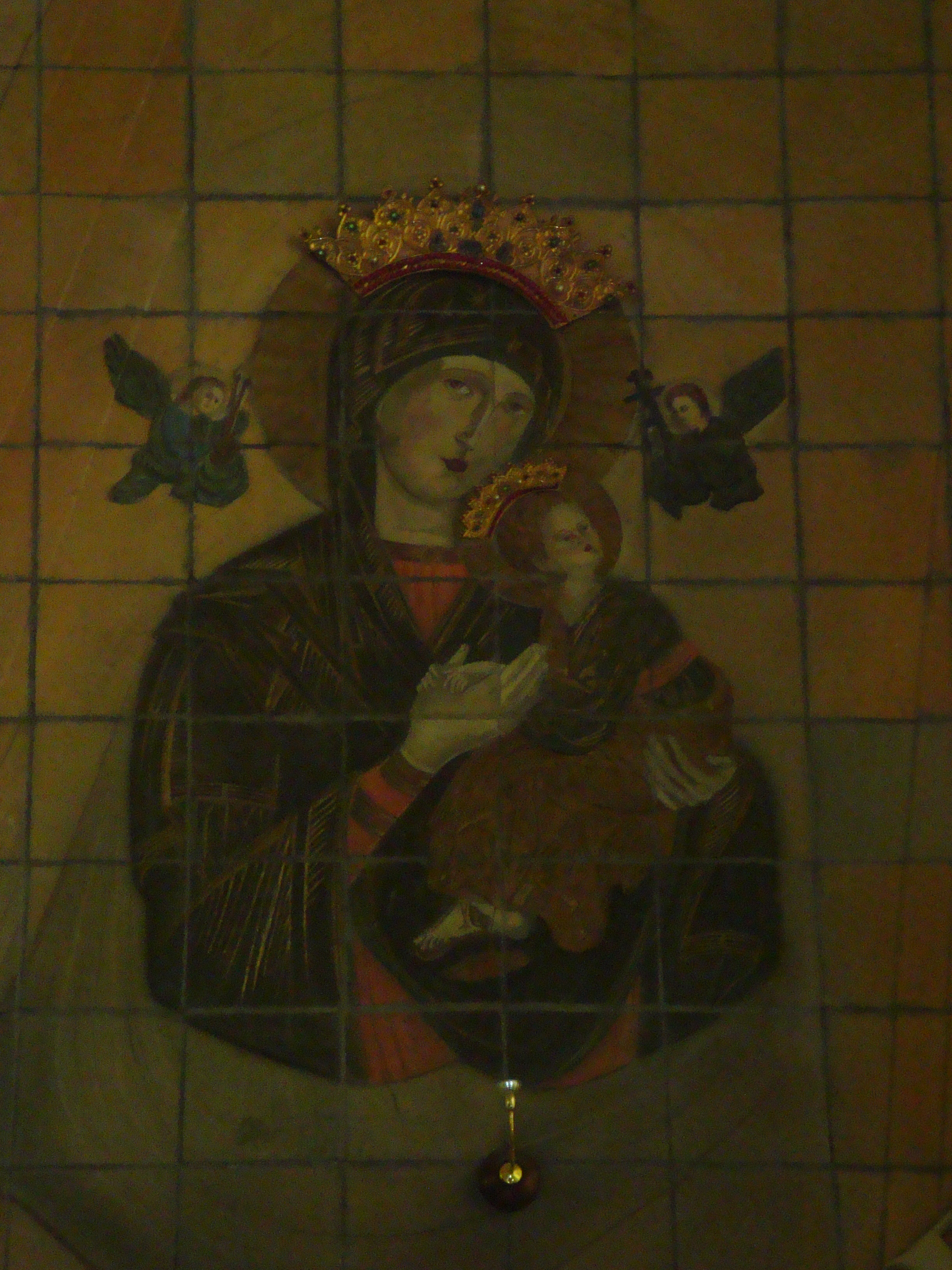
Icon of the parish patroness (main altar)

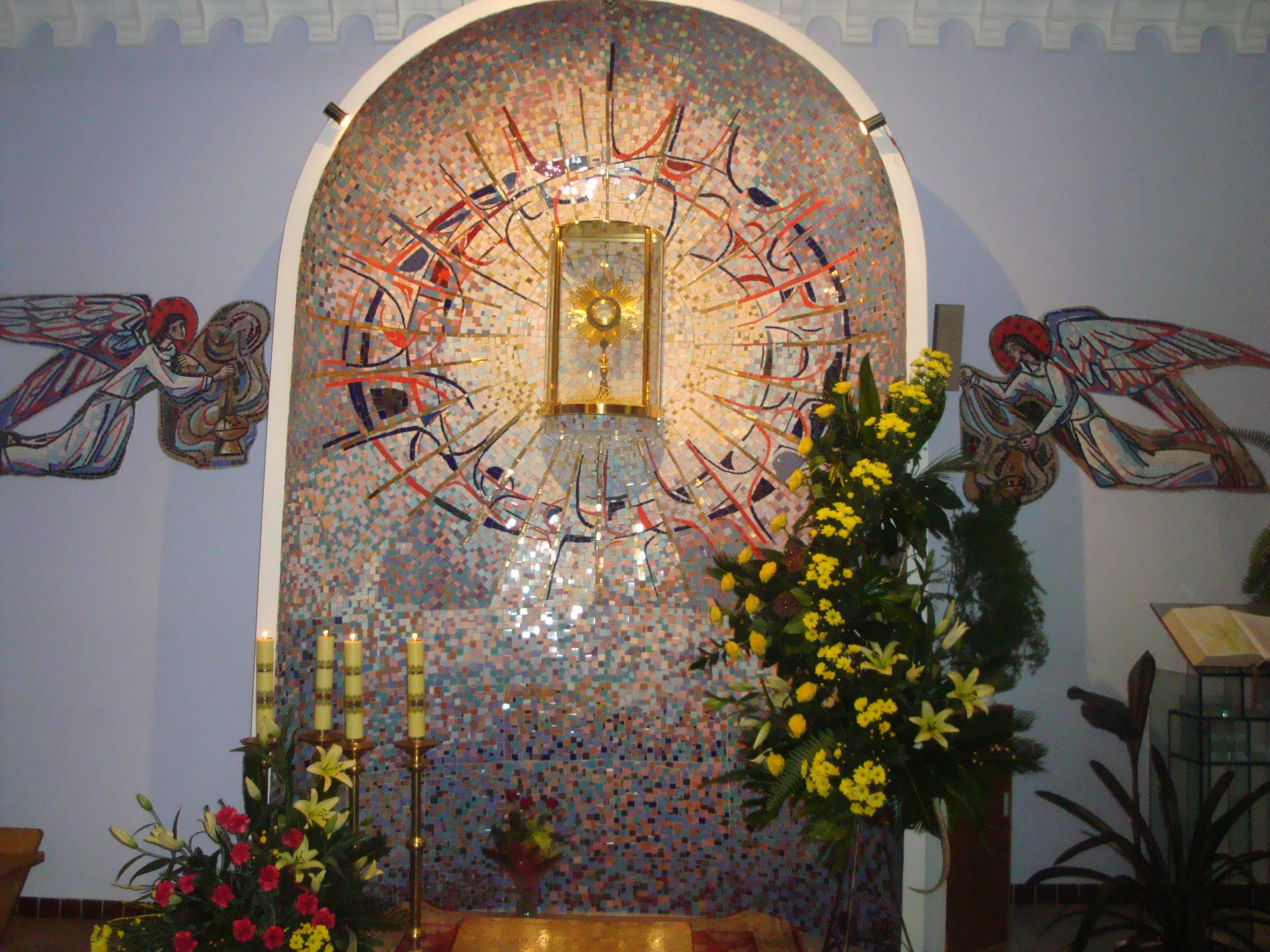
Chapel of Perpetual Adoration (lower church)

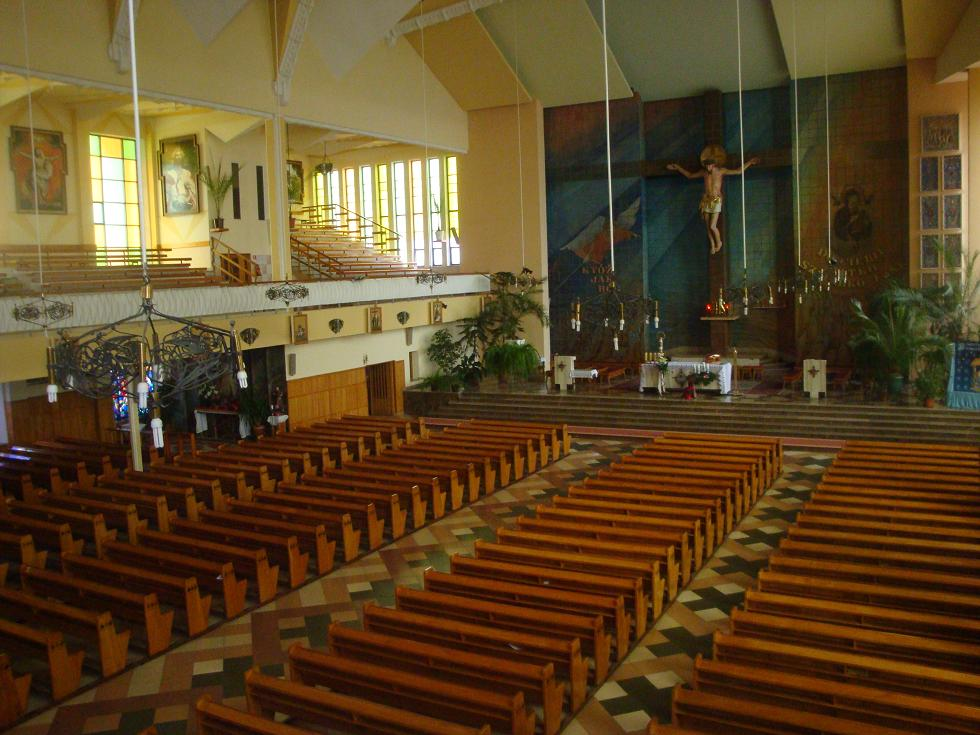
Interior of the church

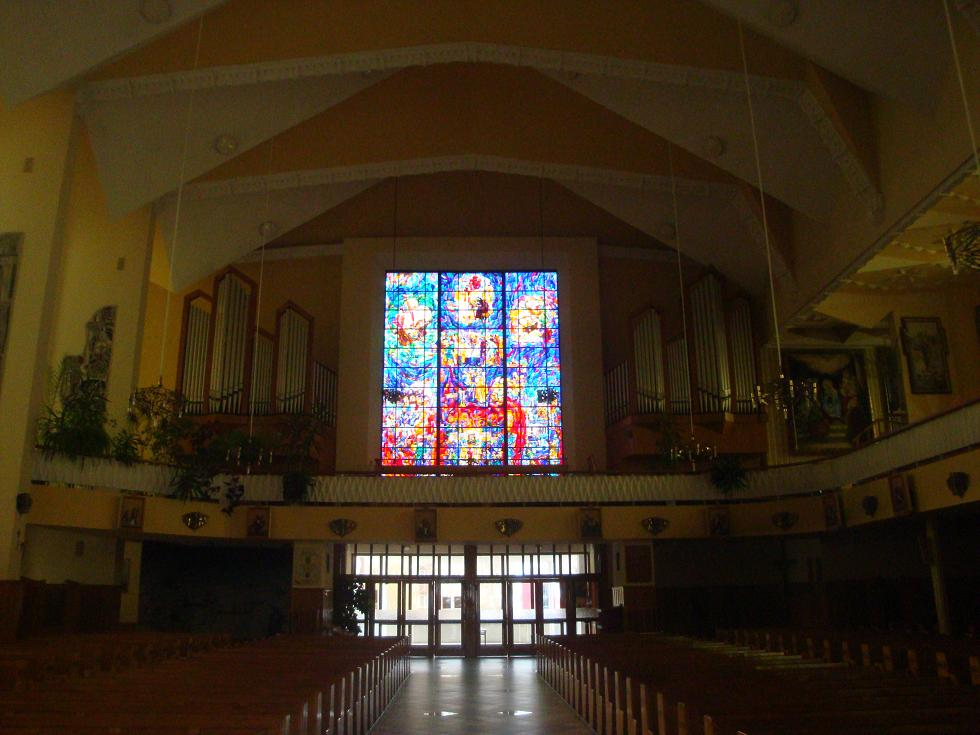
40-stop organ

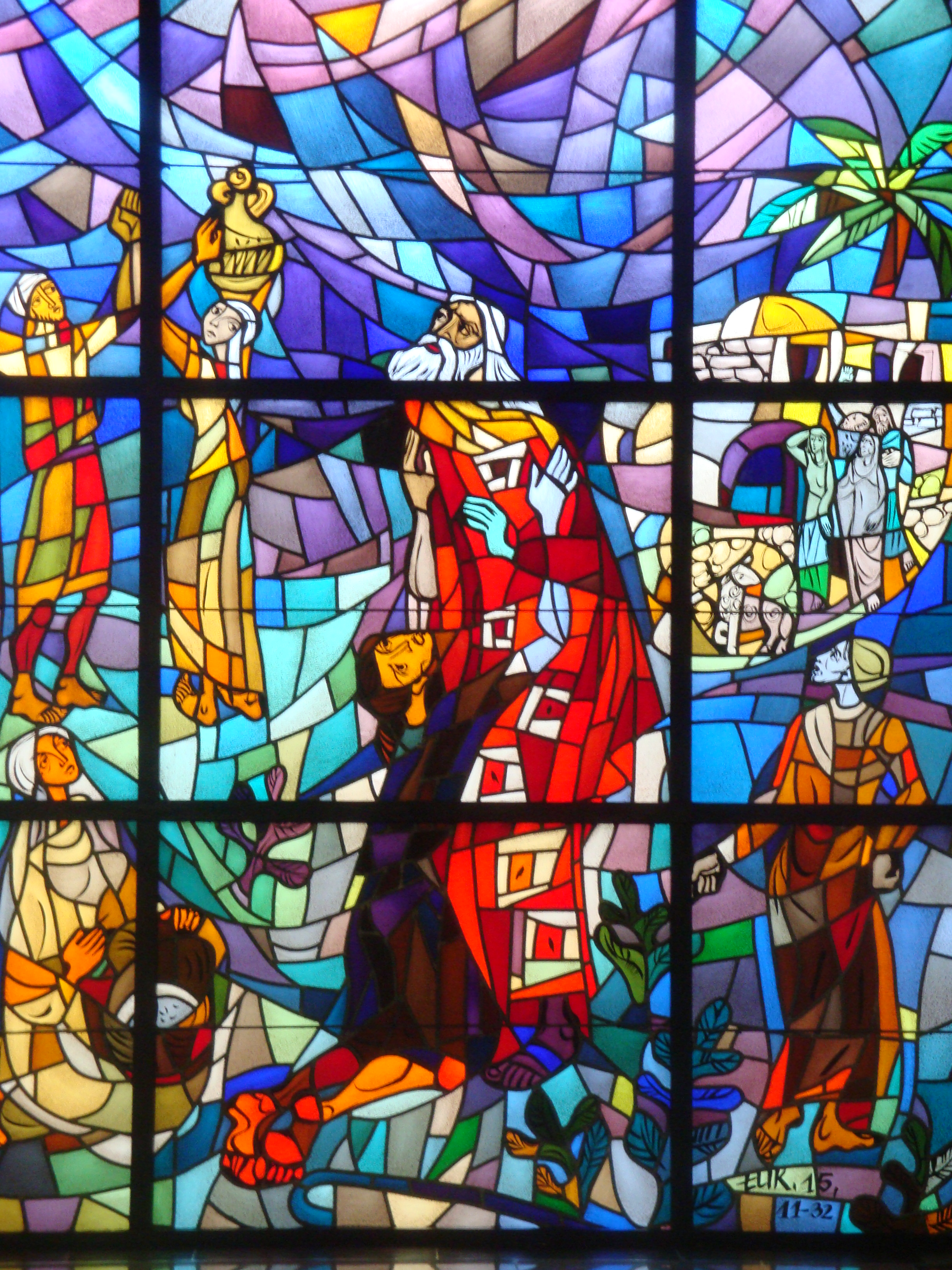
Stained glass depicting the parable of the prodigal son (side nave)

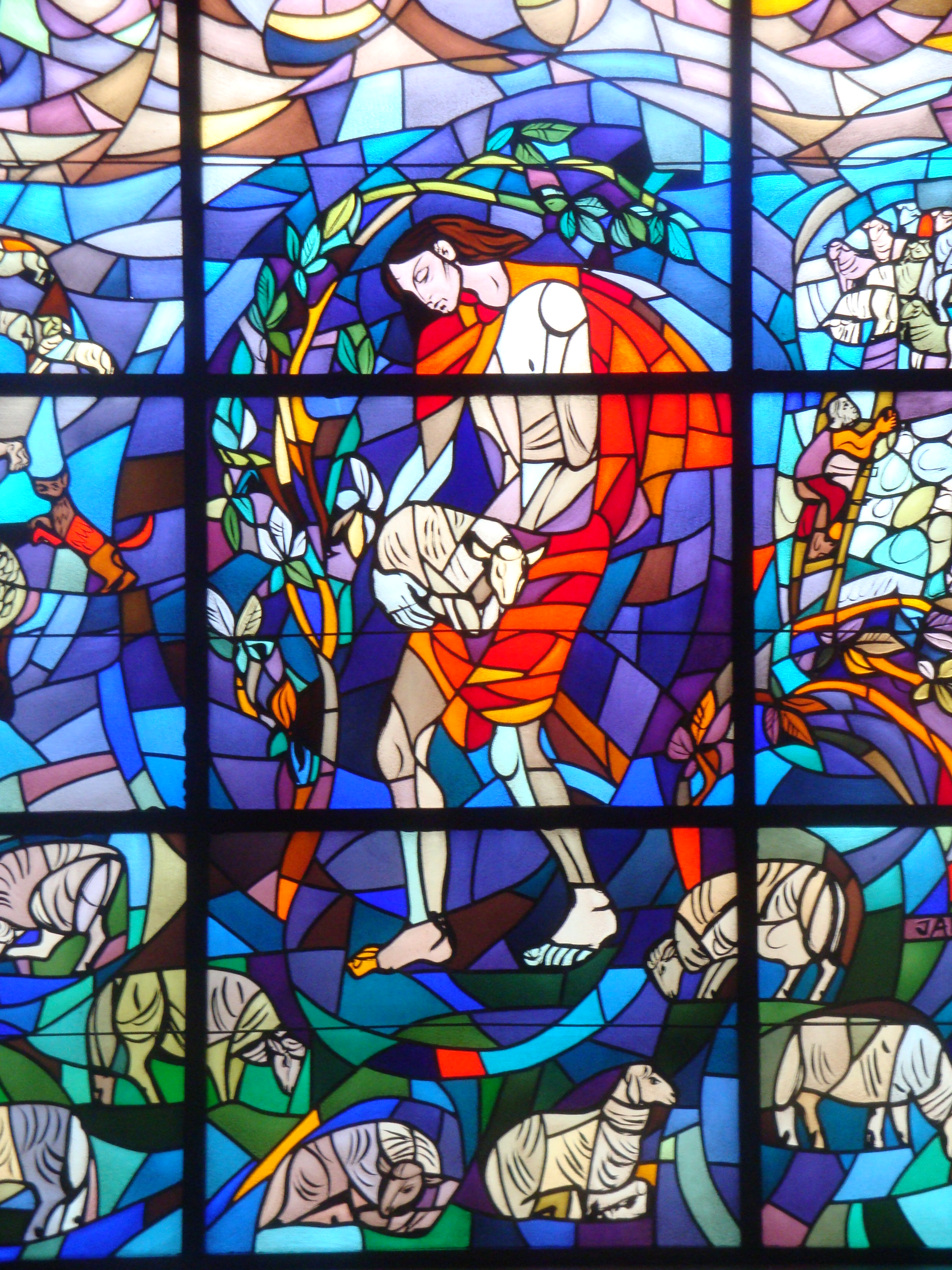
Stained glass depicting the parable of the lost sheep (side nave)

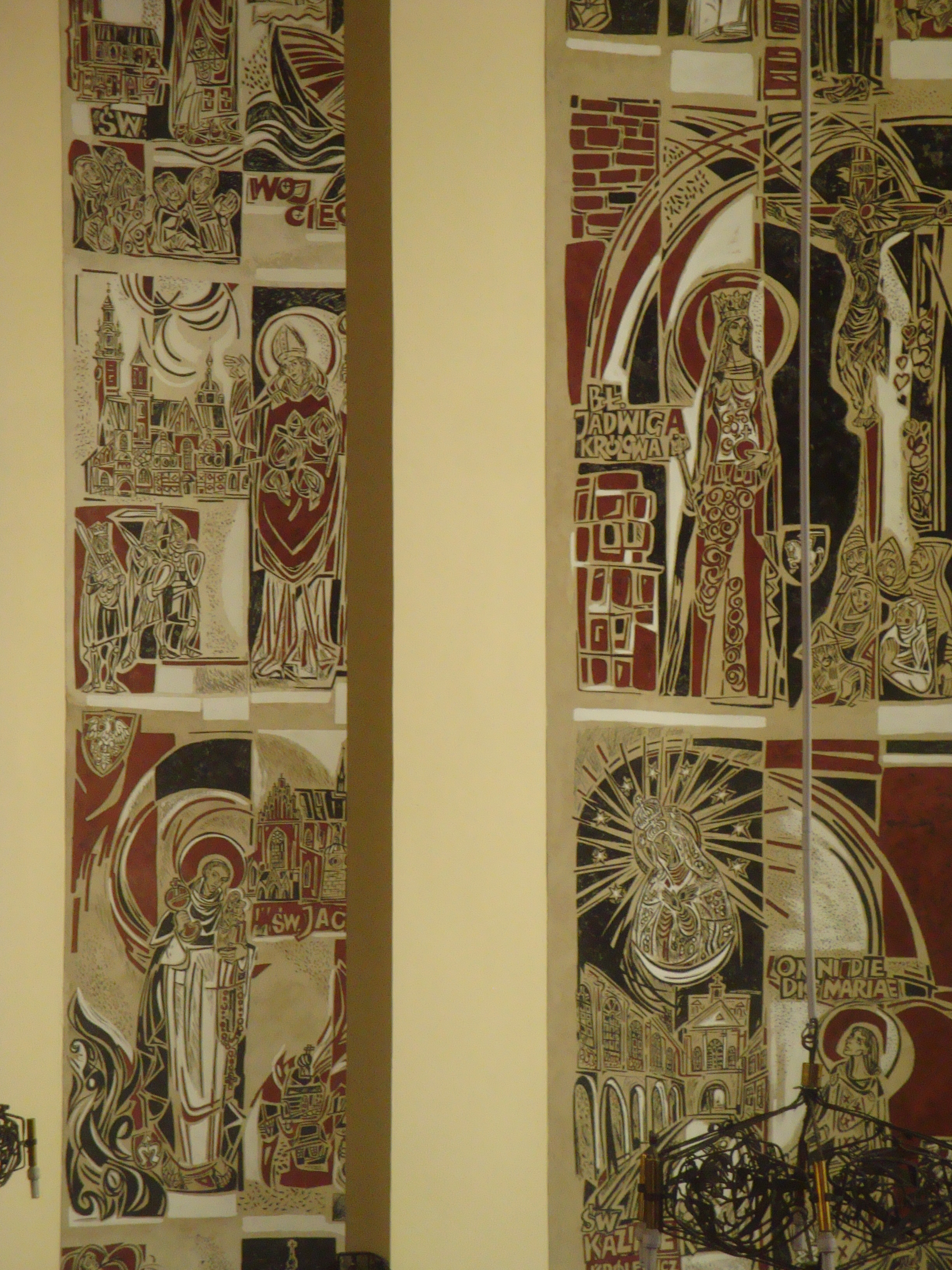
Depiction of Polish saints in frescoes (right side nave)

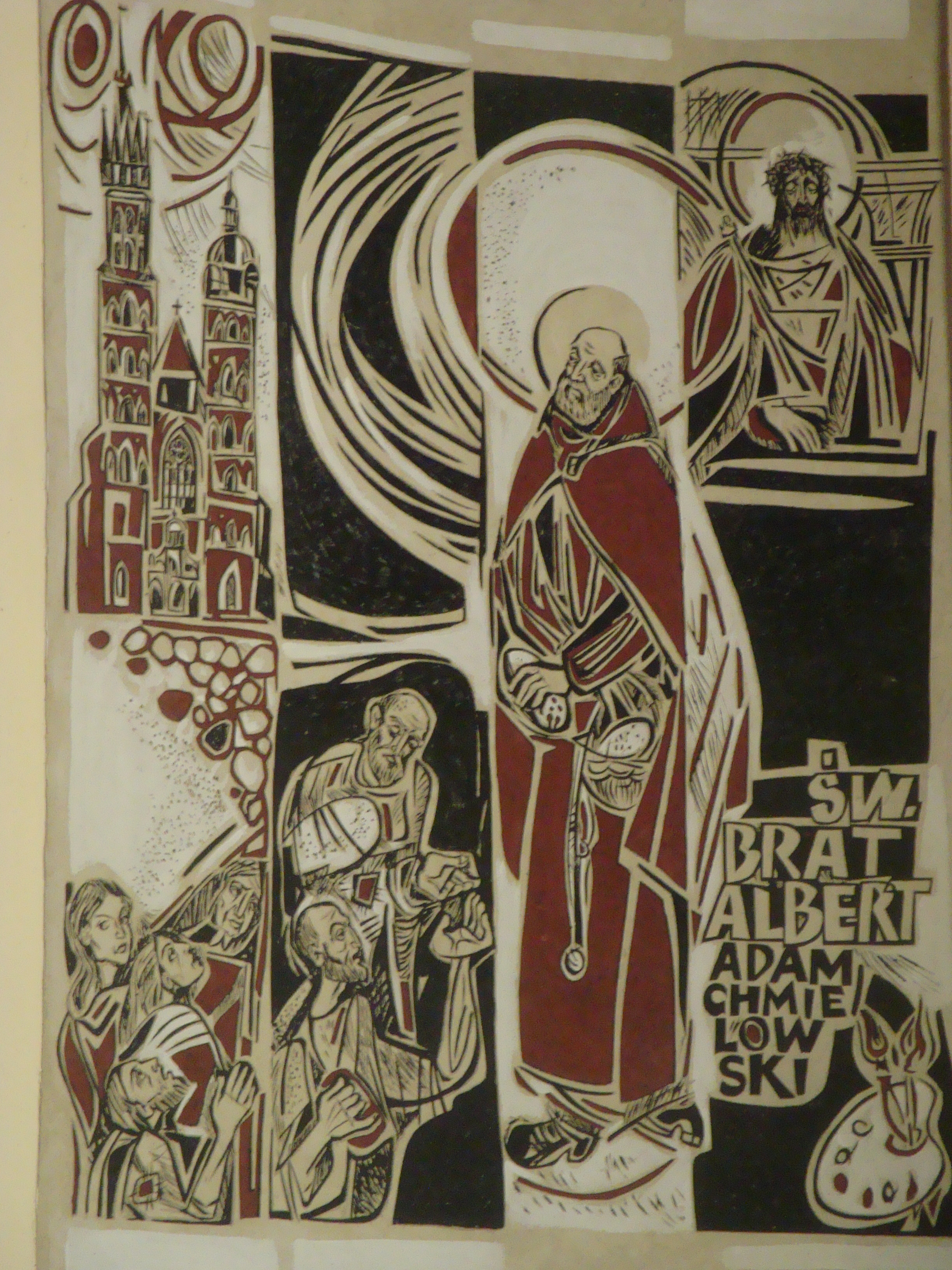
Fresco depicting St. Albert

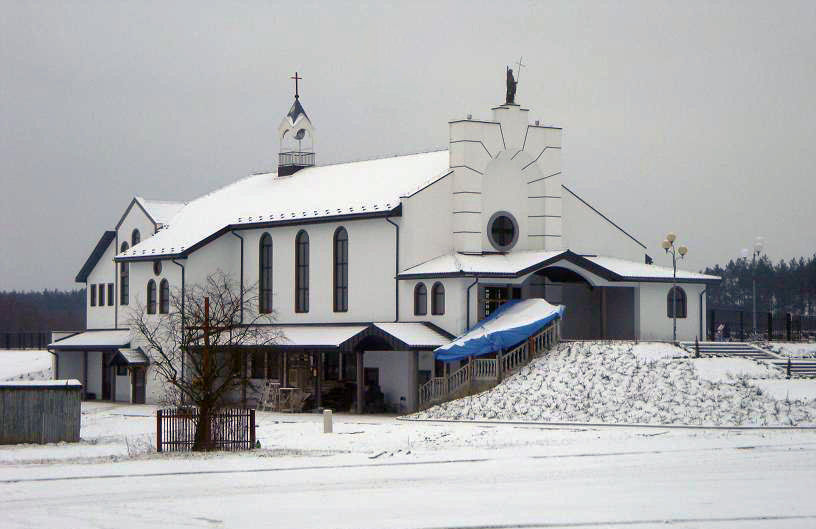
Chapel of All Saints

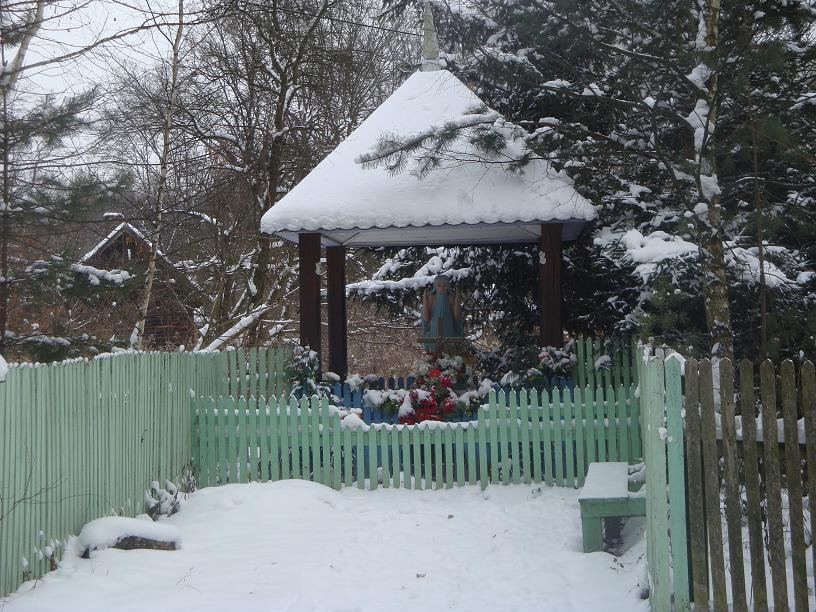
Chapel of St. Onuphrius near the forester's lodge in Zwierzyniec

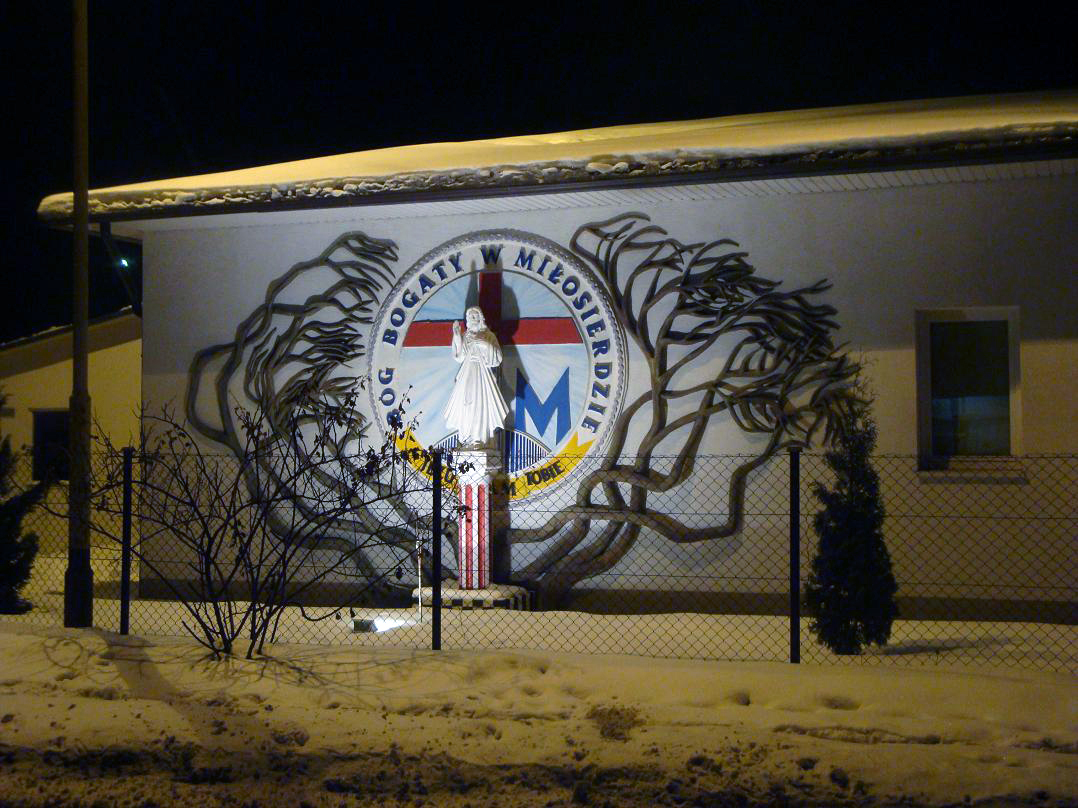
Chapel in the hospice at Dąbrówki Street
Monuments
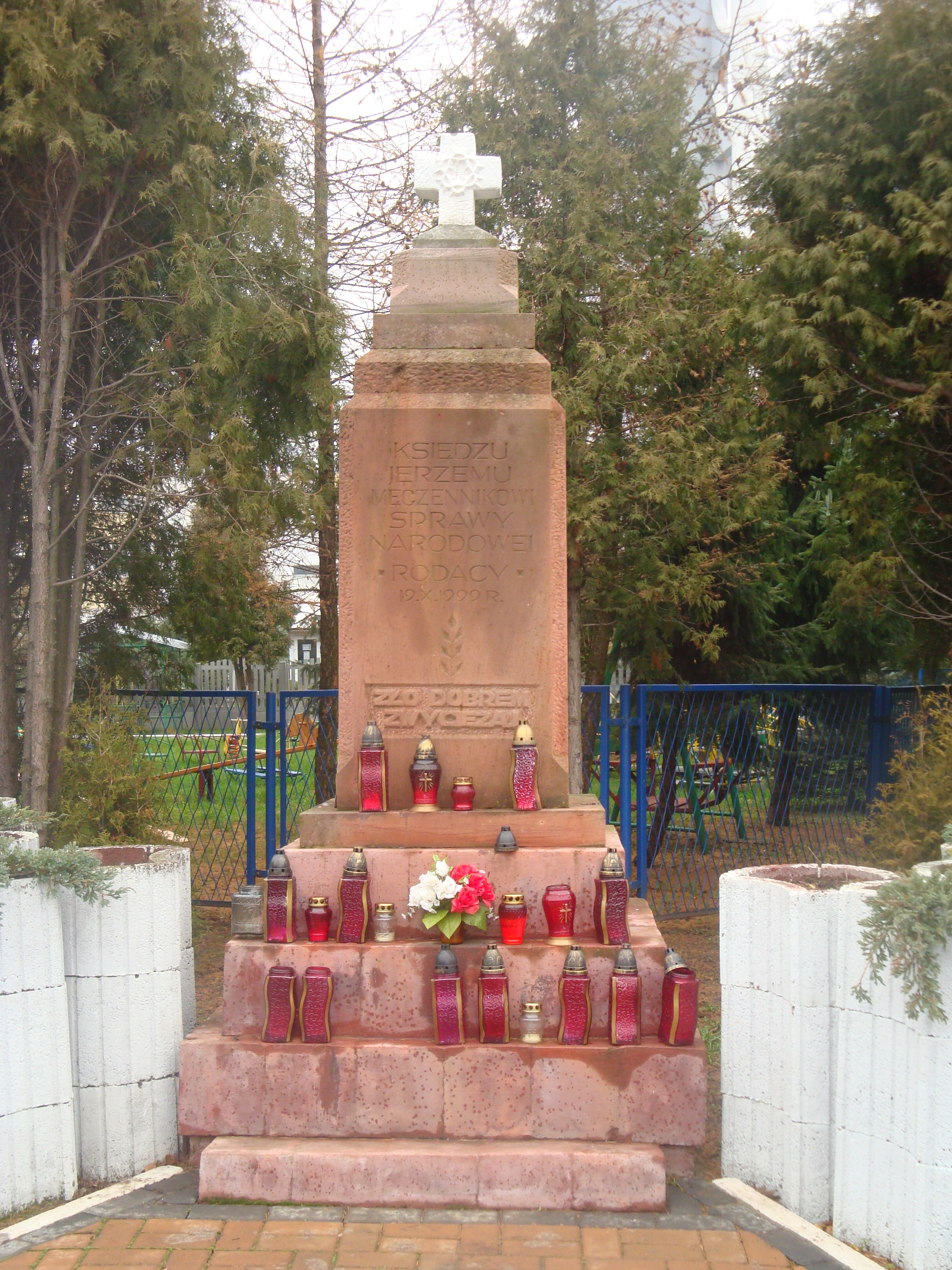
Jerzy Popiełuszko

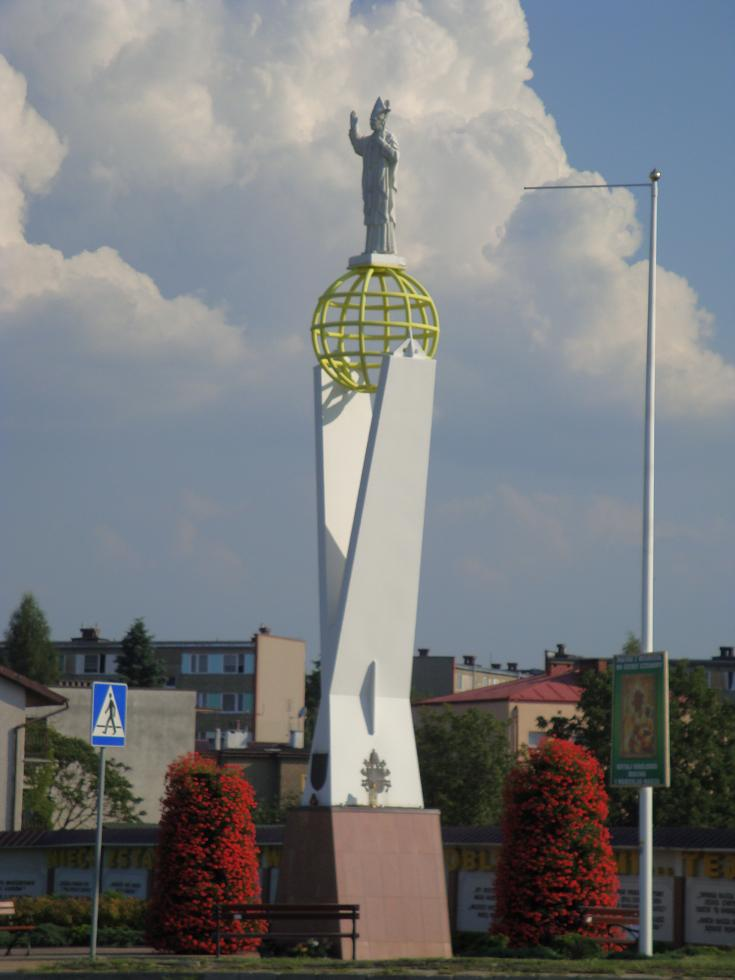
Pope John Paul II
