= Gmina Mniów =

Gmina Mniów Mniów Commune
- Gmina
- Flag Coat of arms
- Interactive map of Gmina Mniów
- Coordinates (Mniów): 51°0′45″N 20°29′11″E
- Country: Poland
- Voivodeship: Świętokrzyskie
- County: Kielce County
- Seat: Mniów

Area
  - Total: 95.27 km^{2} (36.78 sq mi)

Population (2006)
  - Total: 9,249
  - Density: 97.08/km^{2} (251.4/sq mi)
- Website: http://www.mniow.pl

Gmina Mniów is a rural gmina (administrative district) in Kielce County, Świętokrzyskie Voivodeship, located in south-central Poland. Its seat is the village of Mniów, which lies approximately 17 kilometres (11 mi) north-west of the regional capital Kielce.

The gmina covers an area of 95.27 square kilometres (36.8 sq mi). As of 2006 its total population is 9,249. It contains part of the protected area called Suchedniów-Oblęgorek Landscape Park.

== Villages ==
Gmina Mniów contains the villages and settlements of Baran, Borki, Chyby, Cierchy, Gliniany Las, Grzymałków, Kontrewers, Lisie Jamy, Malmurzyn, Mniów, Mokry Bór, Olszyna, Pałęgi, Pępice, Piaski, Pielaki, Pieradła, Podchyby, Przełom, Rogowice, Serbinów, Skoki, Sośnina, Stachura, Straszów, Węgrzynów, Wólka Kłucka, Zaborowice and Zachybie.

== Neighbouring gminas ==
Gmina Mniów is bordered by the gminas of Łopuszno, Miedziana Góra, Radoszyce, Smyków, Stąporków, Strawczyn and Zagnańsk.
