= Lisie Jamy, Świętokrzyskie Voivodeship =

Lisie Jamy
- Village
- Location within Poland
- Coordinates: 51°1′47″N 20°26′2″E
- Country: Poland
- Voivodeship: Świętokrzyskie
- County: Kielce
- Gmina: Mniów
- Population: 86

Lisie Jamy [ˈliɕɛ ˈjamɨ] is a village in the administrative district of Gmina Mniów, within Kielce County, Świętokrzyskie Voivodeship, in south-central Poland. It lies approximately 5 km (3 mi) north-west of Mniów and 21 km (13 mi) north-west of the regional capital Kielce.
