= Serbinów, Tarnobrzeg =

Coordinates: 50°34′32.67″N 21°40′2.12″E

Serbinów
- Tarnobrzeg District
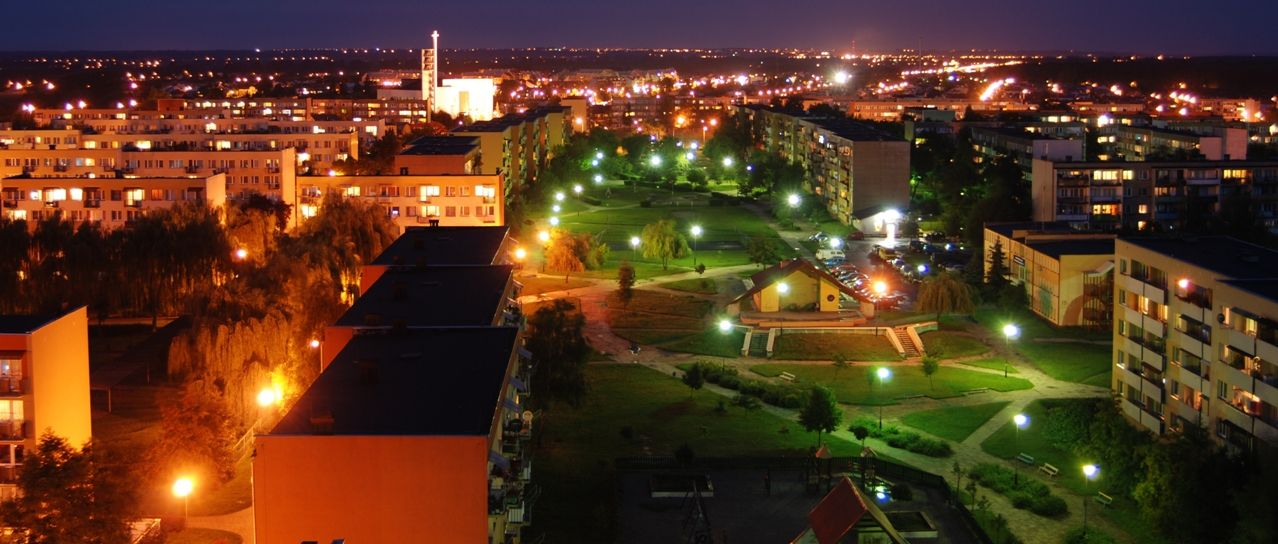

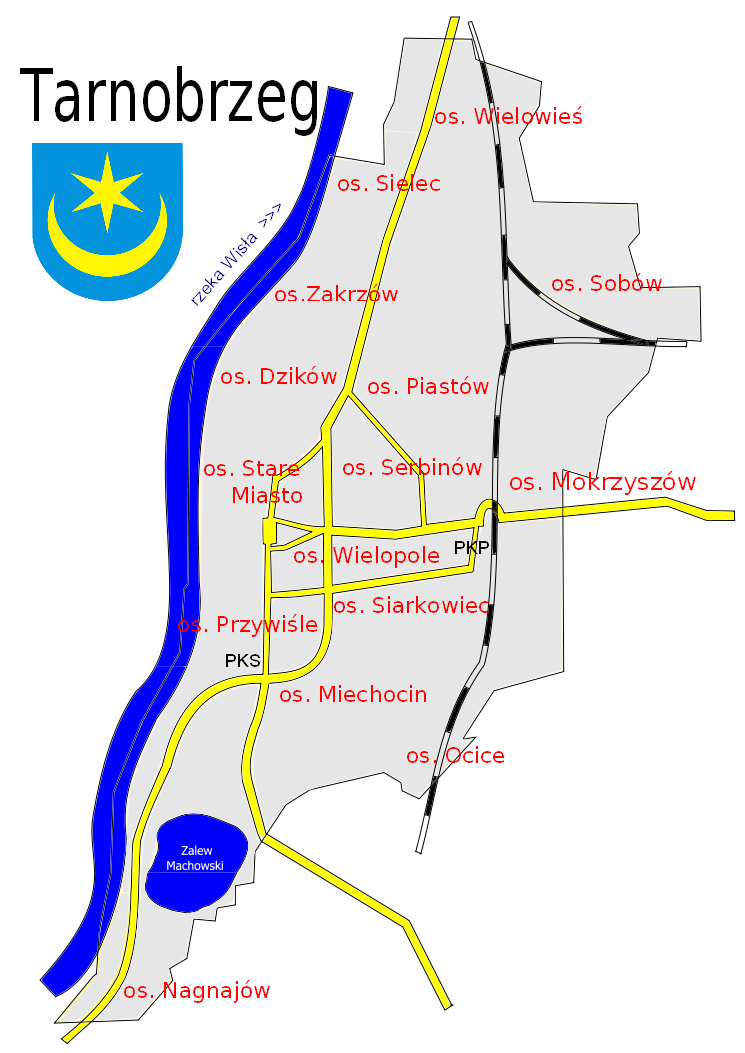
- Country: Poland
- Voivodeship: Podkarpackie
- County/City: Tarnobrzeg
- Notable landmarks: Church of Our Lady of Perpetual Help

Population
  - Total: around 13,000
- Time zone: UTC+1 (CET)
  - Summer (DST): UTC+2 (CEST)
- Postal code: 39-400
- Area code: +48 15

Serbinów (Serbinoov) is a housing estate in Tarnobrzeg, Poland. Situated in an eastern part of the city, it is one of the biggest osiedle there and is inhabited by over 13,000 citizens. Serbinów is bordering with housing estates: Bogdanówka, Dzików, Piastów, Centrum, Mokrzyszów.

== Origins of name ==
The name doesn't have historical grounds and it was chosen in the 1970s through the administration department of the city and the housing cooperative. They named under the influence of series enjoying popularity Nights and days and of associations with muddy Serbinów.

== Borders ==
Borders of the housing estate are outlining streets: Kazimierza Wielkiego, Kwiatkowskiego, Sienkiewicza, Sikorskiego. Pozostałe ulice Serbinowa: Matejki, Jędrusiów, Garażowa, Dąbrowskiej, Zwierzyniecka, Orzeszkowej, Konstytucji 3 Maja, Kossaka, Prusa.

== Sport ==
By the Catholic parish in 1993 came into existence Borough's Sports Club "Community". From 1994 on 1 January a New Year's Run is being organised.

== Culture ==
The cultural life of inhabitants is mainly concentrated in the Catholic parish and in the Residents' Club "Serbinów". In July and August International Organ Virtuoso Performances are held in a Church of the Mother of God of the Incessant Help. In a building of the Primary School was usually held Great Orchestra of Christmas Charity, there a main staff was also located (at present it is a Sq of Bartosz Głowacki and the Team of Secondary Modern Schools by the Rd of Jachowicz). In surroundings of the church fete of the parish (27 June), in the court of the same school an annual holiday of the Familiada is held.

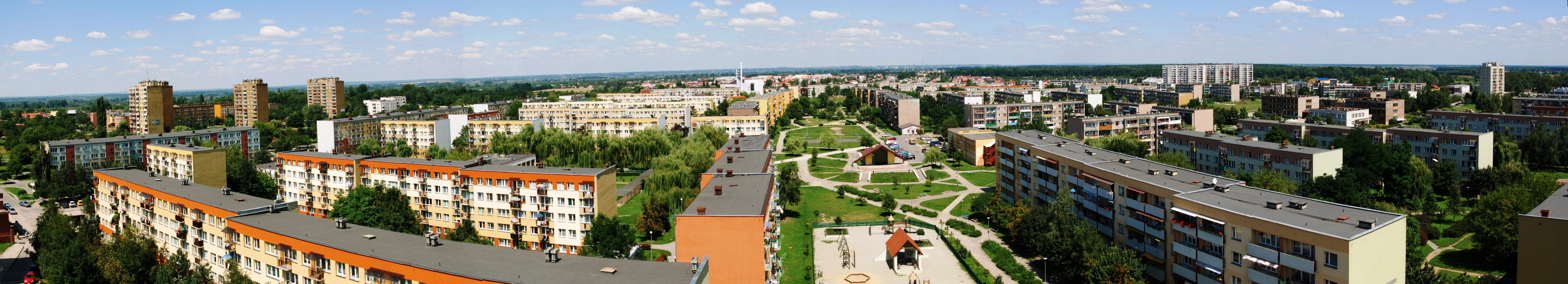
Serbinów in 2008

== See also ==
- Church of Our Lady of Perpetual Help in Tarnobrzeg
- Parish of Our Lady of Perpetual Help in Tarnobrzeg
- Michał Józefczyk
- Serbinów - village in Świętokrzyskie Voivodeship
