= Krościenko Wyżne =

- Village
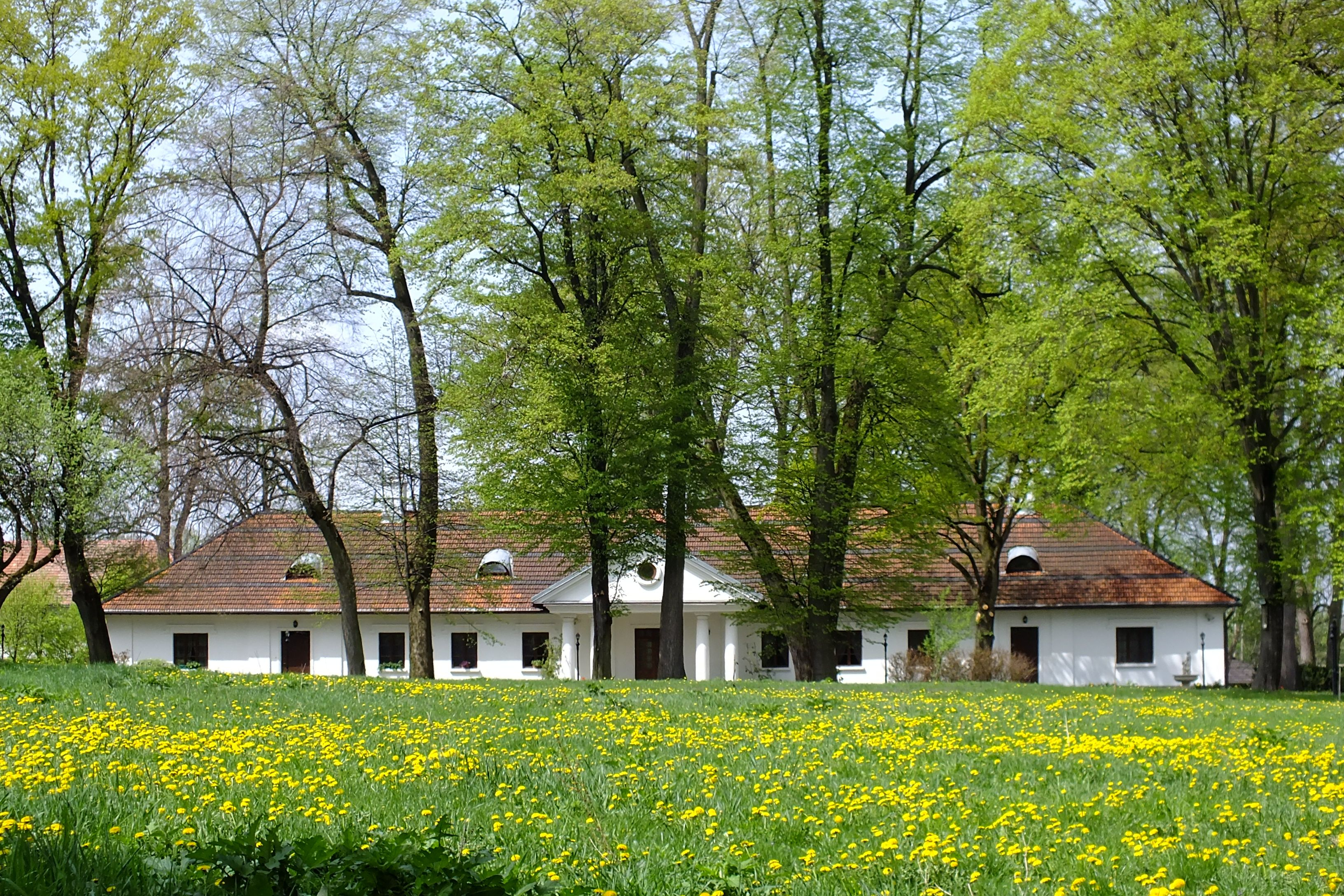
- Old manor house in Krościenko Wyżne

- Location within Poland
- Coordinates: 49°40′52″N 21°49′1″E
- Country: Poland
- Voivodeship: Subcarpathian
- County: Krosno
- Gmina: Krościenko Wyżne

Population
  - Total: 3,700
- Time zone: UTC+1 (CET)
  - Summer (DST): UTC+2 (CEST)
- Vehicle registration: RKR

Krościenko Wyżne [krɔɕˈt͡ɕɛnkɔ ˈvɨʐnɛ] is a village in Krosno County, Subcarpathian Voivodeship, in south-eastern Poland. It is the seat of the gmina (administrative district) called Gmina Krościenko Wyżne.
