= Michał Józefczyk =

Polish priest

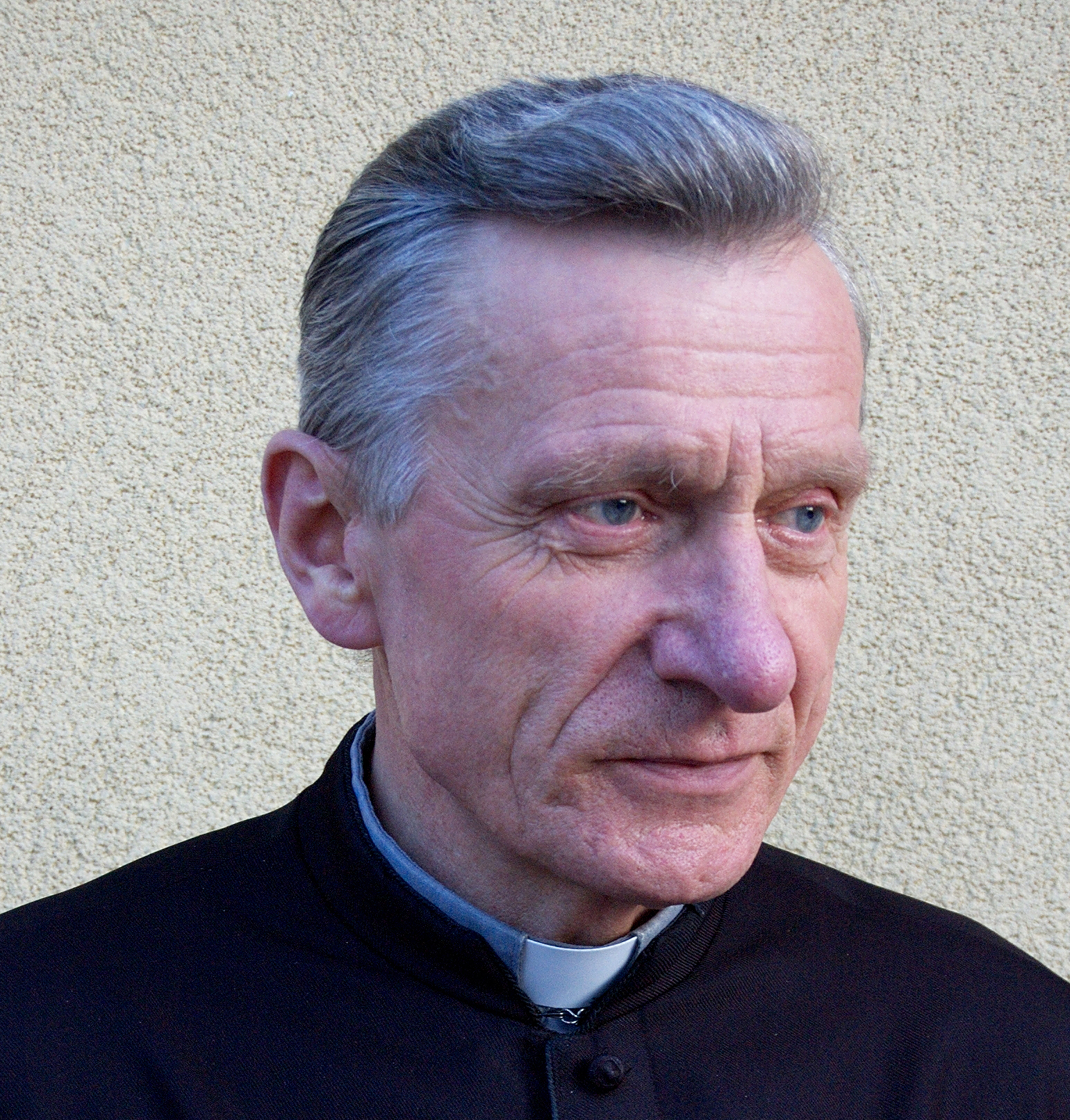
- 2009, fot. Rafał Tracz
- Born: September 29, 1946; Krościenko Wyżne
- Died: June 20, 2016 (aged 69); Tarnobrzeg
- Church: Roman Catholic
- Offices held: provost of parish Mother of God Comforter in Lipnica, provost of parish of Our Lady of Perpetual Help in Tarnobrzeg
- Title: prelate

Michał Józefczyk (September 29, 1946 – June 20, 2016) was a Polish Catholic priest.

He was born in Krościenko Wyżne, and studied theology as a seminary clerical student in Przemyśl. He was consecrated as a priest in Miejsce Piastowe on June 17, 1972. He was made a provost of the Church of Our Lady of Perpetual Help in Tarnobrzeg in 1979. He became a prelate in 1994, and a protonotary apostolic in 2002.

Józefczyk was held in high regard for his public and social work within Tarnobrzeg. He was named "Citizen of Tarnobrzeg of 20th Century" by the Tarnobrzeg City Hall, and was voted "Citizen of Tarnobrzeg in 2008" by local radio listeners and TV viewers. He also received the Order of the Smile honor in 2006 for his charitable work with children in Tarnobrzeg.

== See also ==
- Roman Catholic Diocese of Sandomierz
- Roman Catholic Archdiocese of Przemyśl
