= Mniów =

- Village
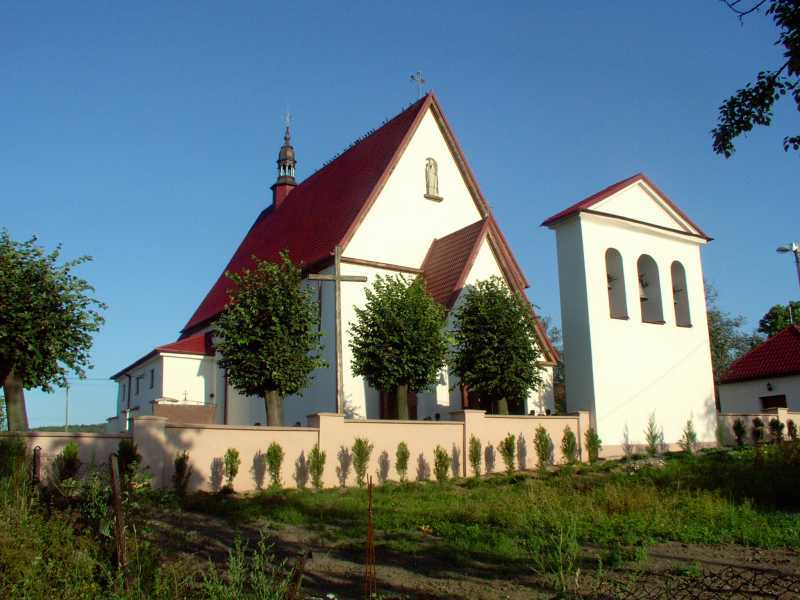
- Church in Mniów

- Coat of arms

- Location within Poland
- Coordinates: 51°0′45″N 20°29′11″E
- Country: Poland
- Voivodeship: Świętokrzyskie
- County: Kielce
- Gmina: Mniów
- Population: 1,956
- Website: http://www.mniow.pl

Mniów [mɲuf] is a village in Kielce County, Świętokrzyskie Voivodeship, in south-central Poland. It is the seat of the gmina (administrative district) called Gmina Mniów. It lies approximately 17 km (11 mi) north-west of the regional capital Kielce.

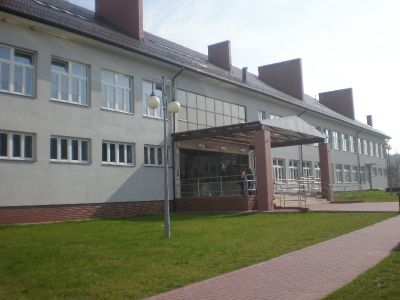
Primary School in Mniów

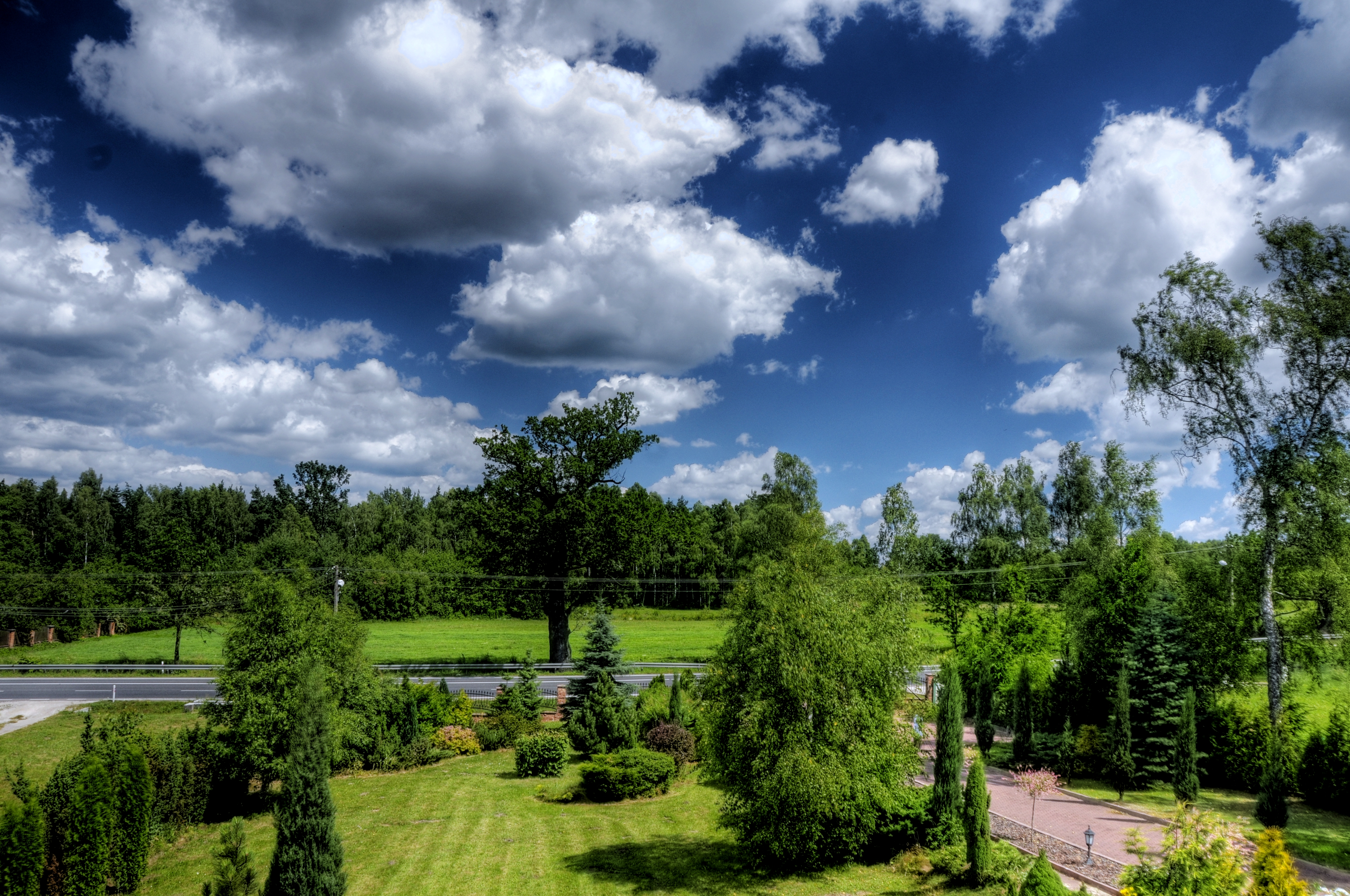
View at Kielecka street
