= Tarnowski family =

Polish noble family

The Coat of Arms of the family was: Leliwa.

The House of Tarnowski is an old Polish noble and aristocratic family (szlachta). Because Polish adjectives have different forms for the genders, Tarnowska is the form for a female family member.

== History ==
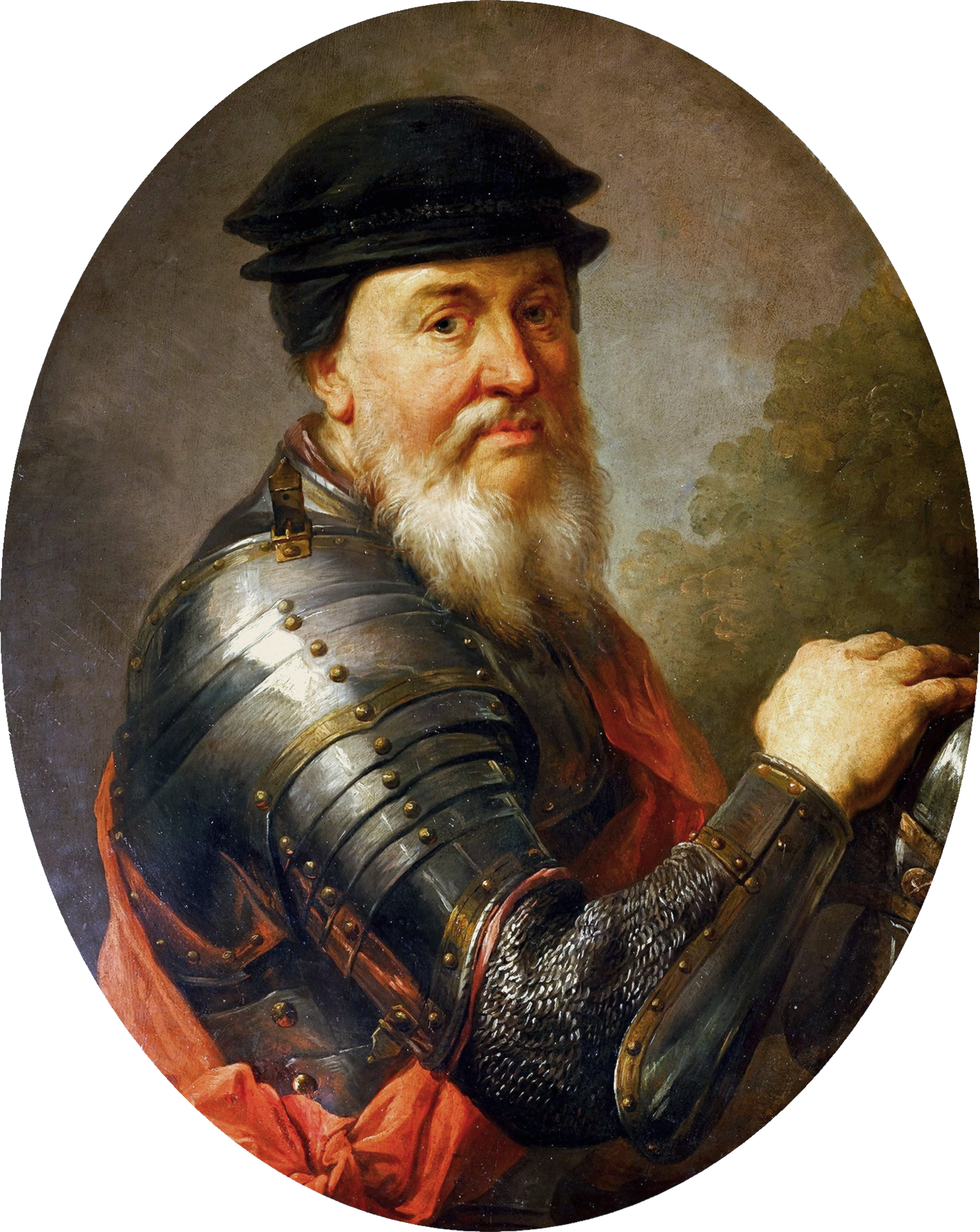
Hetman Jan Amor Tarnowski by Marcello Bacciarelli.

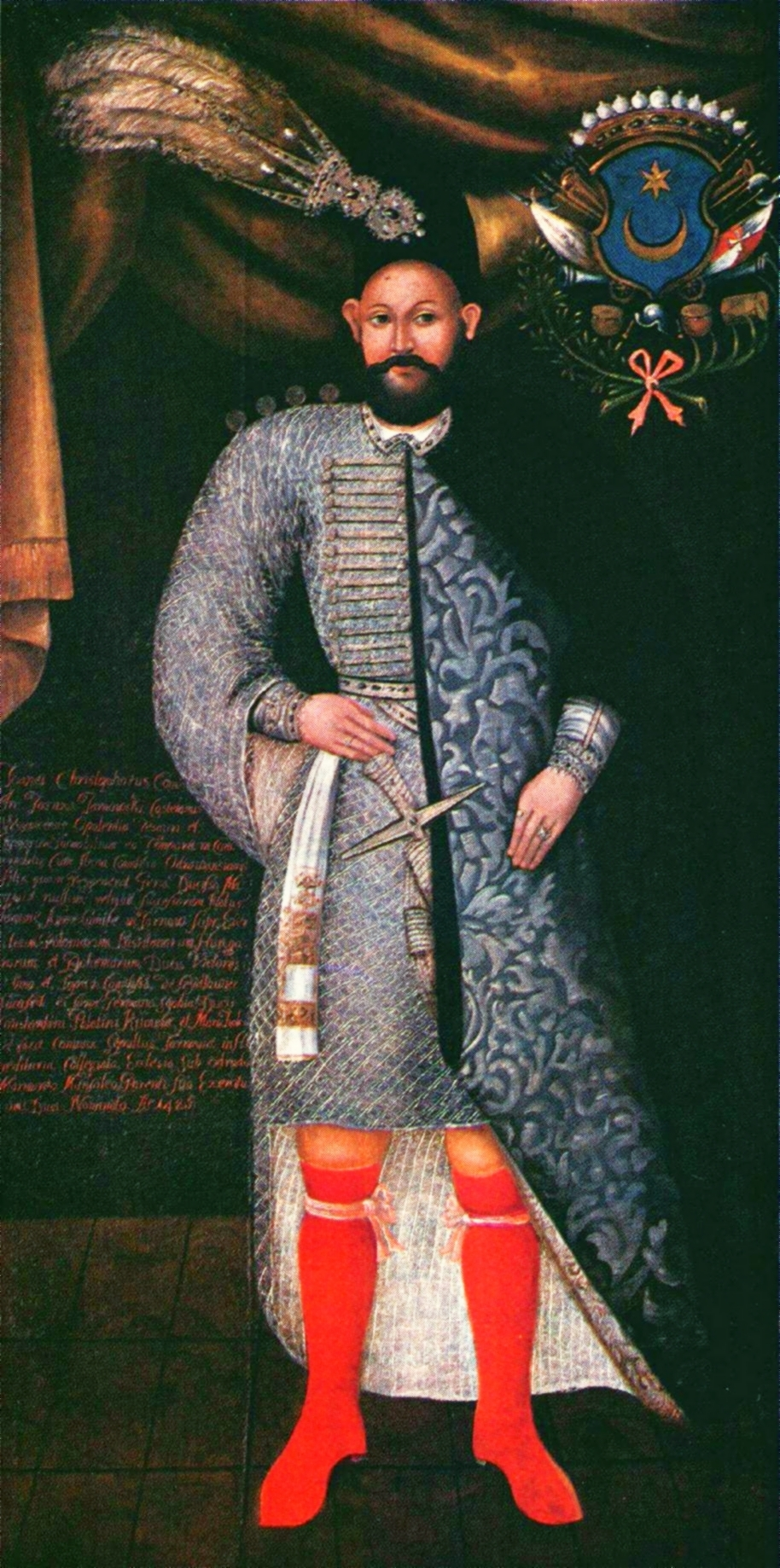
Jan Krzysztof Tarnowski.

The Tarnowski family was one of the oldest and most powerful magnate families in Poland. It reached its apex in the 14th, 15th and the 16th centuries, when members of the Tarnów, Melsztyn and later Jarosław branches held prominent positions beside the Piast and Jagiellon kings of Poland. From father to son, the Tarnowski family held ten times the office of voivode of Kraków Voivodeship and six times the office of castellan of Kraków.

The history of the family started with the trusted advisor of the last Piast kings Comes Spytek z Melsztyna, the progenitor of the Tarnowski-Melsztyński-Jarosławski family. By 1320 he held the office of voivode of Kraków, and from 1331 the highest secular office in the Kingdom of Poland, castellan of Kraków. For his military service, King Władysław I the Elbow-high gave him large estates on the Dunajec river, where Spytek founded the city of Tarnow in 1330 and built two stronghold castles in Tarnow and Melsztyn around 1340.

After the death of Spytek, the castle of Melsztyn was inherited by his son Jan z Melsztyna, who like his father was from 1360 voivode and castellan of Kraków. His younger brother, the castellan of Wiślica Rafał z Tarnowa, became the owner of Tarnow. Rafał expanded his estates, adding land in Sandomierz, Wielowieś and Dzików.

After the death of Jan Krzysztof Tarnowski, the majority of the Tarnowski lands passed to the Ostrogski family, marked in pink

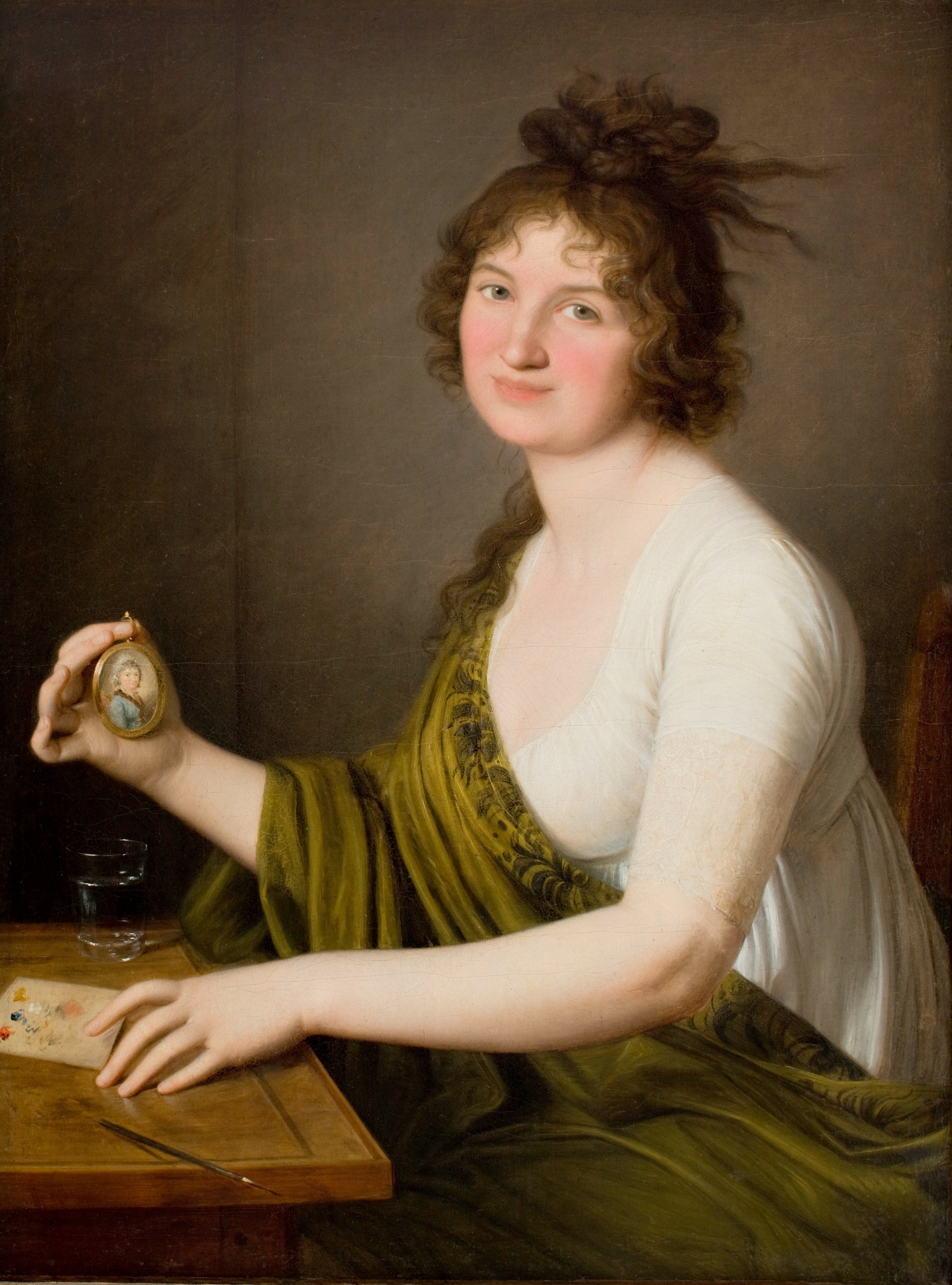
Waleria Tarnowska.

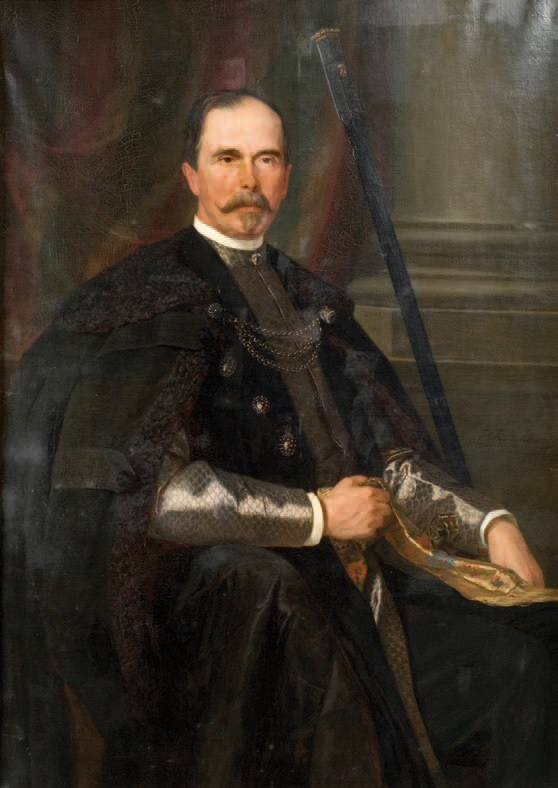
Jan Dzierżysław Tarnowski.

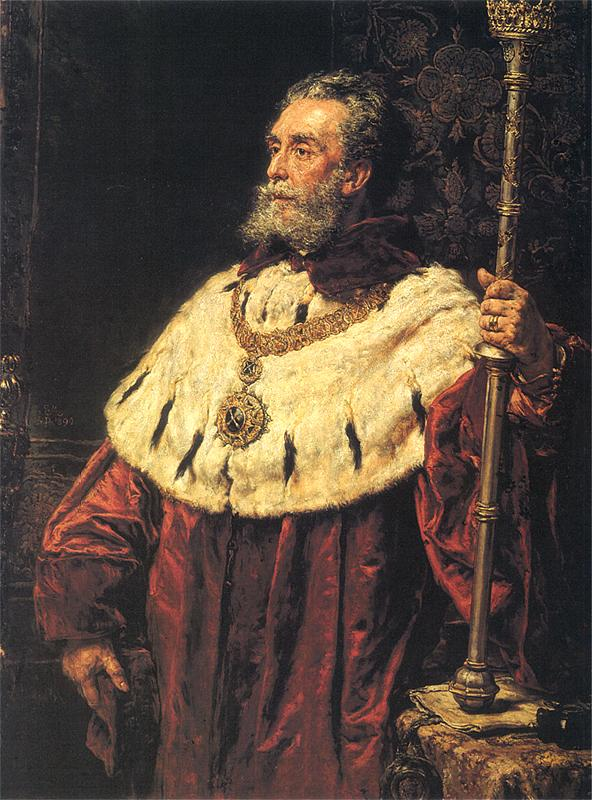
Stanisław Tarnowski by Jan Matejko.

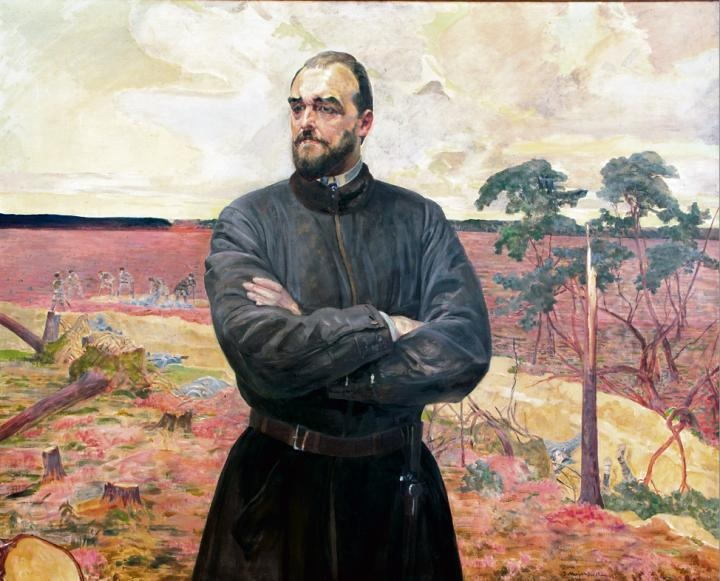
Zdzisław Tarnowski by Jacek Malczewski

The son of Jan z Melsztyna, Spytek z Melsztyna, was the next owner of Melsztyn. He was voivode of Kraków, Feudal Lord of Podolia, and hero of the 1399 battle of Worskla. Rafał's son Jan z Tarnowa was appointed General Starost of Ruthenia, and both voivode and castellan of Kraków.

The Tarnowski-Melsztyński family achieved the highest offices in the country as well as extraordinary wealth and huge feudal estates, including land in Jarosław, Sambor, Podole, etc. Their most significant role in the history of Poland was to organise the union of Queen Jadwiga and Władysław II Jagiełło and to initiate their coronation.

After the death of Spytek z Melsztyna and the death of his son, who was also named Spytek z Melsztyna, in the 1439 battle of Grotniki, the Melsztyn line declined. In the Tarnów line, the sons of Jan z Tarnowa fought in the Battle of Grunwald in 1410 and after that divided the family property. Jan the voivode of Kraków Voivodeship settled in Tarnów, and the voivode of Sandomierz Voivodeship Spytek became the owner of Jarosław, where he started a new branch of the family, called the "Leliwita branch".

Jan z Tarnowa had five sons, of which Jan Amor Starszy Tarnowski and Jan Gratus Tarnowski together with their cousin, Spytek z Jarosławia, died with King Władysław III of Poland in the 1444 Battle of Varna. His third son Jan Rafał Tarnowski became a priest and the last two, Jan Feliks Tarnowski became voivode of Lublin Voivodeship, while Jan Amor Młodszy Tarnowski inherited Tarnów and was appointed voivode of Kraków, and in 1490 castellan of Kraków.

The son of Jan Amor Młodszy, Jan Amor Tarnowski, became Great Crown Hetman, voivode of Kraków and castellan of Kraków. In 1540 he built a castle and founded the city of Tarnopol (1548).

== Coat of arms and motto ==
The Tarnowski family used the "Leliwa coat of arms" and their motto was: "Tendite ad astra viri". It is a quotation from Valerius Flaccus' Argonautica, book I, verse 563.

Coat of Arms of Counts Tarnowski

== Members ==
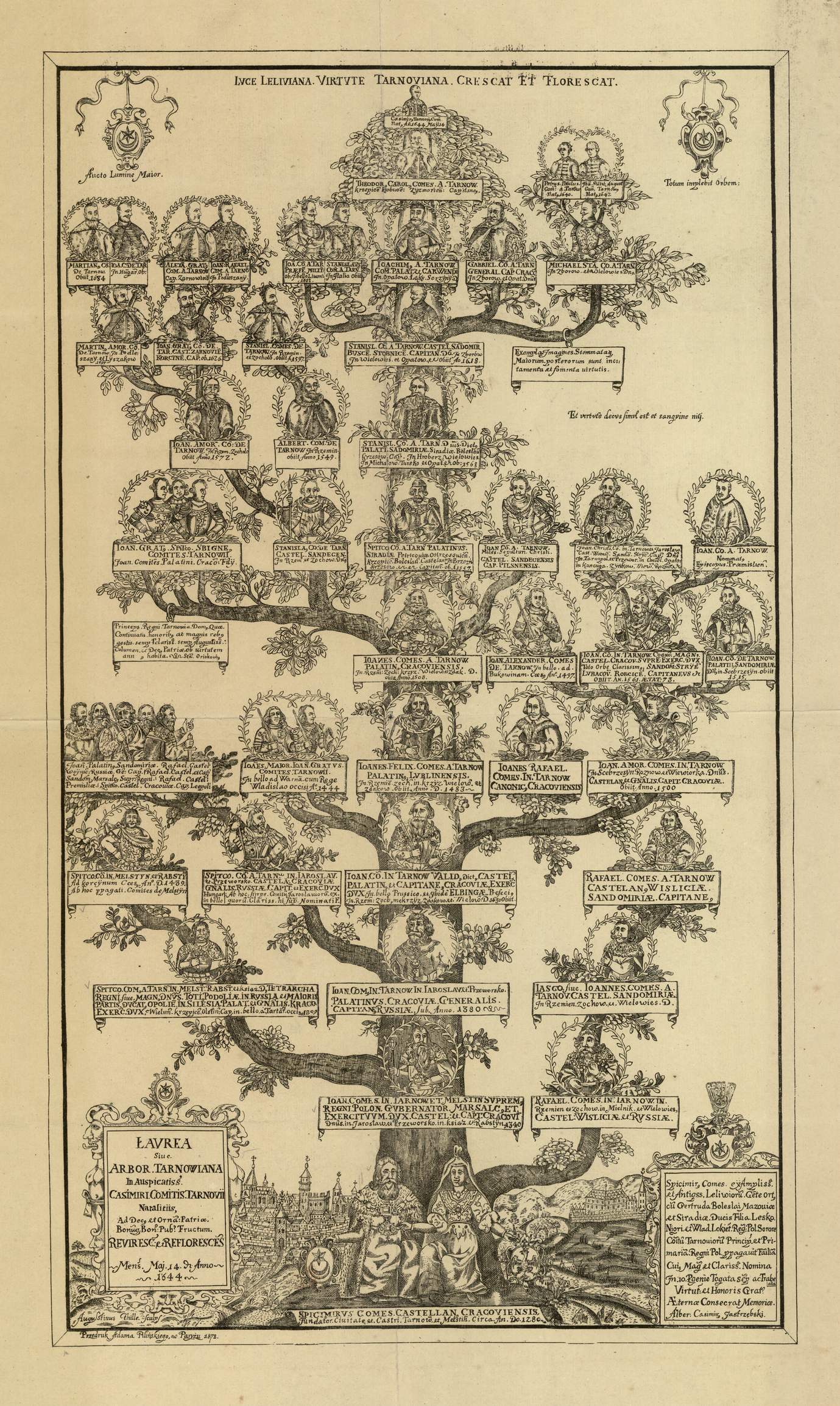
Tarnowski Family Tree by Augustinus Thille (engraving 1644, reprinted by Adam Piliński, 1872)

- Spycimir Leliwita (d.1352), castellan of Kraków, and statesman.
  - his wife Stanisława of Bogoria and Skotnik (d.1352), Polish noblewoman.
- Rafał of Tarnów (c.1330–1373).
- Jan of Tarnow (c.1349–1409), castellan of Kraków, signatory of the Pact of Vilnius and Radom.
- Jan of Tarnow (1367–1433) commander of a banner at the Battle of Grunwald.
- Spytek I of Jarosław (cca. 1367- 1435), commander of a banner at the Battle of Grunwald.
- Spytek II of Jarosław (d. 1444), Polish nobleman.
- Spytek III of Jarosław (ca. 1436–1519), Polish nobleman, voivode of Kraków.
- Jan of Melsztyn (c.1326–1381), castellan of Kraków, grandfather of the Queen Consort of Poland, Elizabeth Granowska.
- Spytko I of Melsztyn (14th century), castellan of Kraków, Sądecczyzna and Wiślica.
- Spytko II of Melsztyn (1364–1399), Duke of Podolia, voivode of Kraków, initiated marriage of Queen Jadwiga of Poland and Władysław II Jagiełło.
  - his wife Elizabeth Lackfi (d. 1428), Hungarian noble, second wife of John I of Münsterberg.
- Jadwiga of Melsztyn (1388–1424), wife of Bernard of Niemodlin, Duke of Opole, Godmother of King Władysław II Jagiełło.
- Spytko III of Melsztyn (1398–1439), Polish Hussite, organiser of the Korczyn Confederation.
- Spytko IV of Melsztyn (d. 1503), voivode of Kraków.
- Anna Tarnowska-Melsztynska (1463–1521), was married to Mikołaj Kamieniecki (1460–1515) the first Grand Hetman of the Polish-Lithuanian Commonwealth.
- Jan "Ciezki" Tarnowski (c.1479–1527), castellan, landowner.
- Jan Feliks "Szram" Tarnowski (1471–1507), Chorąży, voivode, Stolnik.
- Jan Tarnowski (1488–1561), Grand Hetman.
- Jan Krzysztof Tarnowski (1537–1567), Secretary to the King, last of the Tarnow line.
  - his wife Zofia Odrowąż (1537–1580), daughter of Anna of Masovia, the last Masovian Piast duchess.
- Zofia Tarnowska (1534–1570), was married to Konstanty Wasyl Ostrogski.
- Jan Spytek Tarnowski (1488–1553), statesman, Grand Treasurer of the Crown.
- Dorota Tarnowska (c. 1513–c.1540), was married to Jan Tarło.
- Stanisław Spytek Tarnowski (1514–1568), statesman, Grand Treasurer of the Crown.
- Barbara Tarnowska (c.1566–1610), was married to Jan Zamoyski (1542–1605), Chancellor and Grand Hetman.
- Euphrosine Eulalia Tarnowska (c.1615–1645), was married to Hieronim Radziejowski (1612–1667), Deputy Chancellor and Marshall of the Sejm; and mother of Cardinal Michał Stefan Radziejowski (1645–1705), Archbishop of Gniezno and Primate of Poland.
- Jan Feliks Tarnowski (1777–1842), senator, landowner and art collector (for example, Lotto's Adoration of the Christ Child).
  - his wife Waleria Tarnowska (1782–1849), painter and art collector (notably of The Polish Rider and Canova's Perseus Triumphant).
- Władysław Tarnowski (1836–1878), pianist, composer, poet, dramatist, translator.
- Stanisław Tarnowski (1837–1917), academic, politician, twice rector of Jagiellonian University, member of Austria's Herrenhaus.
- Stanisław Tarnowski (Biały) (1838–1909), painter and art collector.
- Adam Tarnowski (senior) (1866–1946), Austro-Hungarian diplomat.
  - his wife Maria Tarnowska née Czetwertyńska (1884–1965), nurse, negotiated the surrender of Warsaw during the 1944 uprising against the Nazis.
- Adam Tarnowski (minister) (1892–1956), diplomat, Foreign Minister of Polish government-in-exile.
- Zofia Tarnowska (1917–2009), was married to W. Stanley Moss.
- Rula Lenska, b. 1947, Polish-British actress.

== Residences ==
Some of the prominent residences of the Tarnowski family are:

Residences of the Tarnowski Family

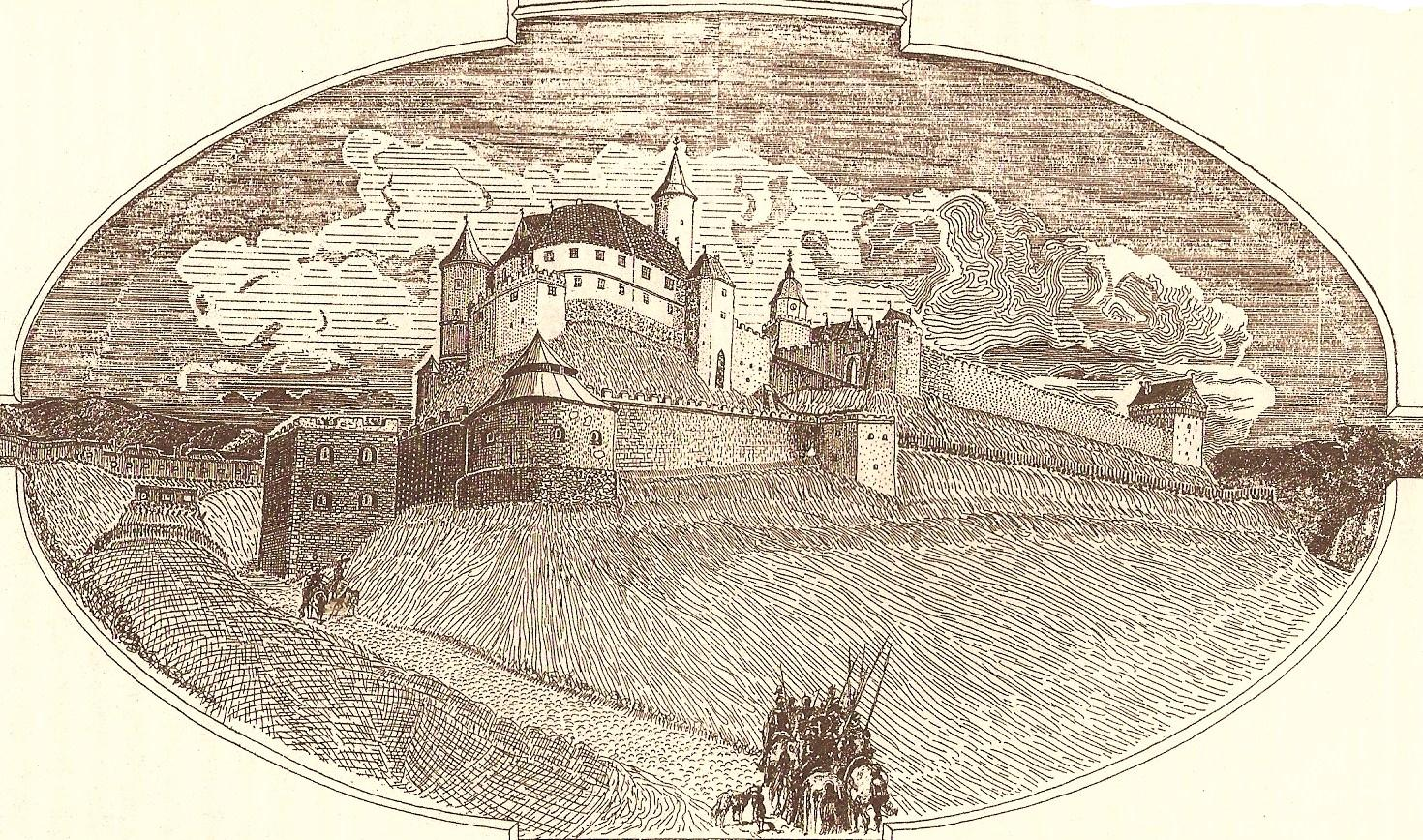
Tarnów Castle at the beginning of the 17th century by K. Moskal, view from the northwest.

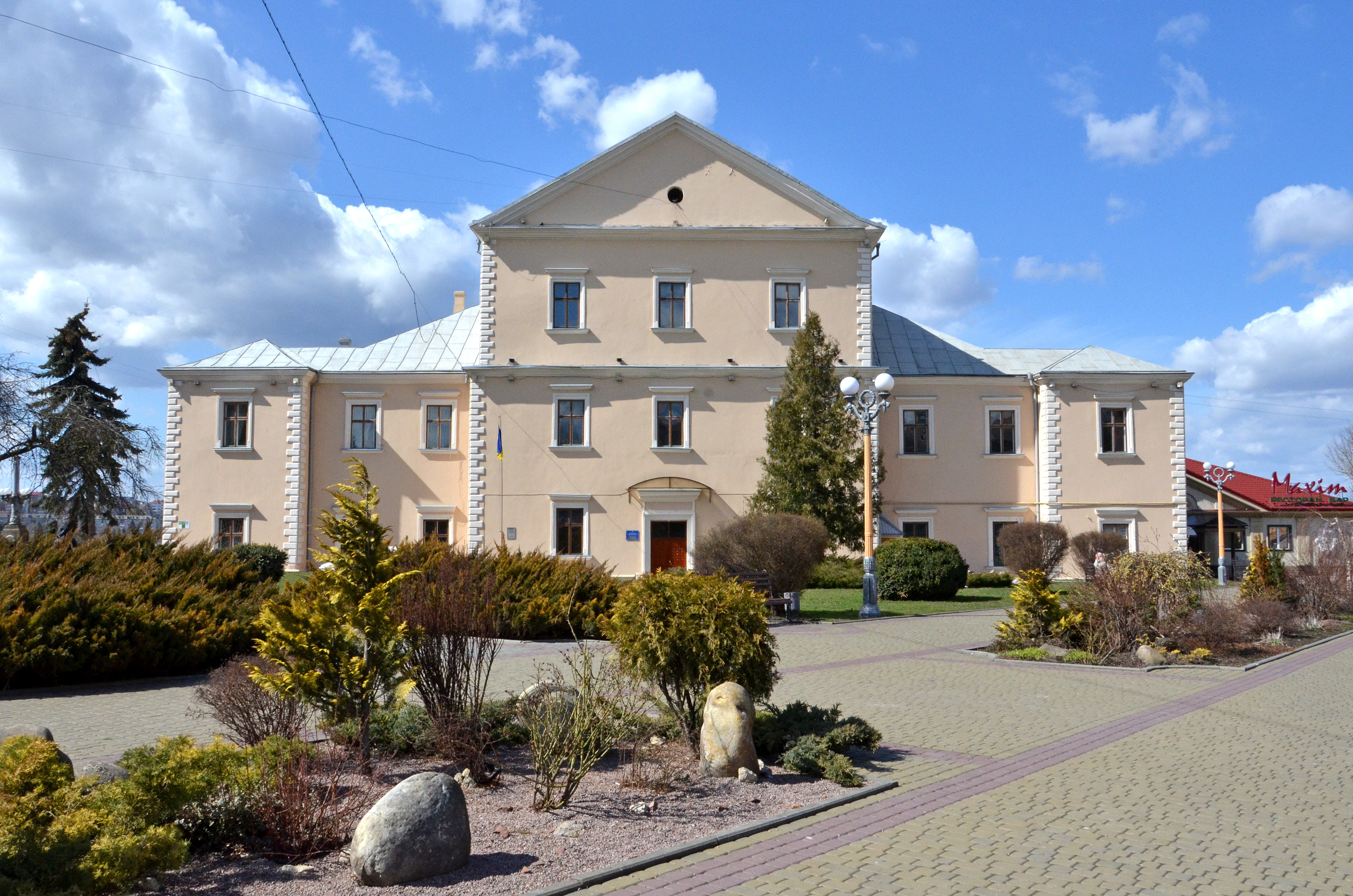
Tarnopol Castle

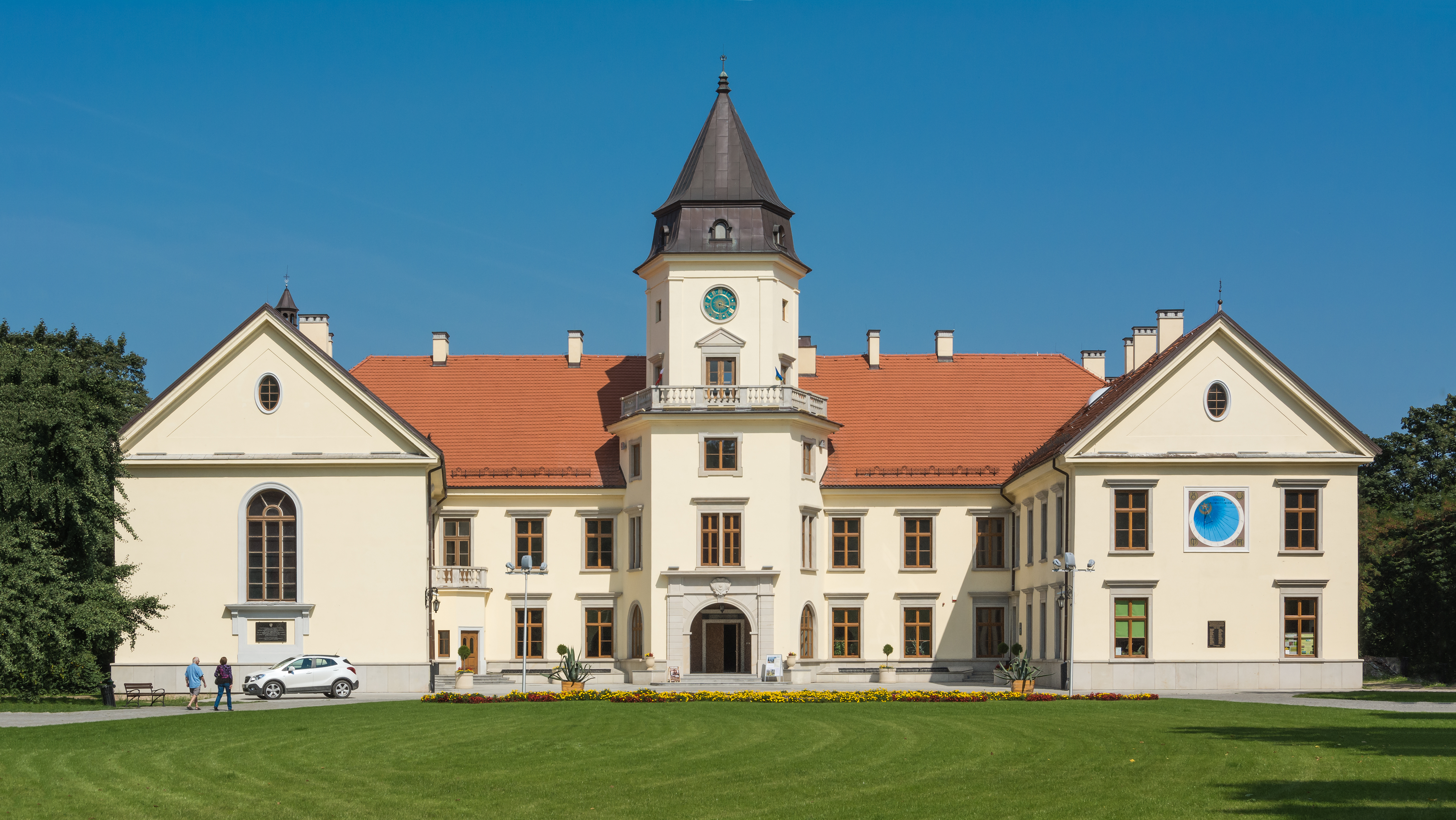
Dzikow Castle

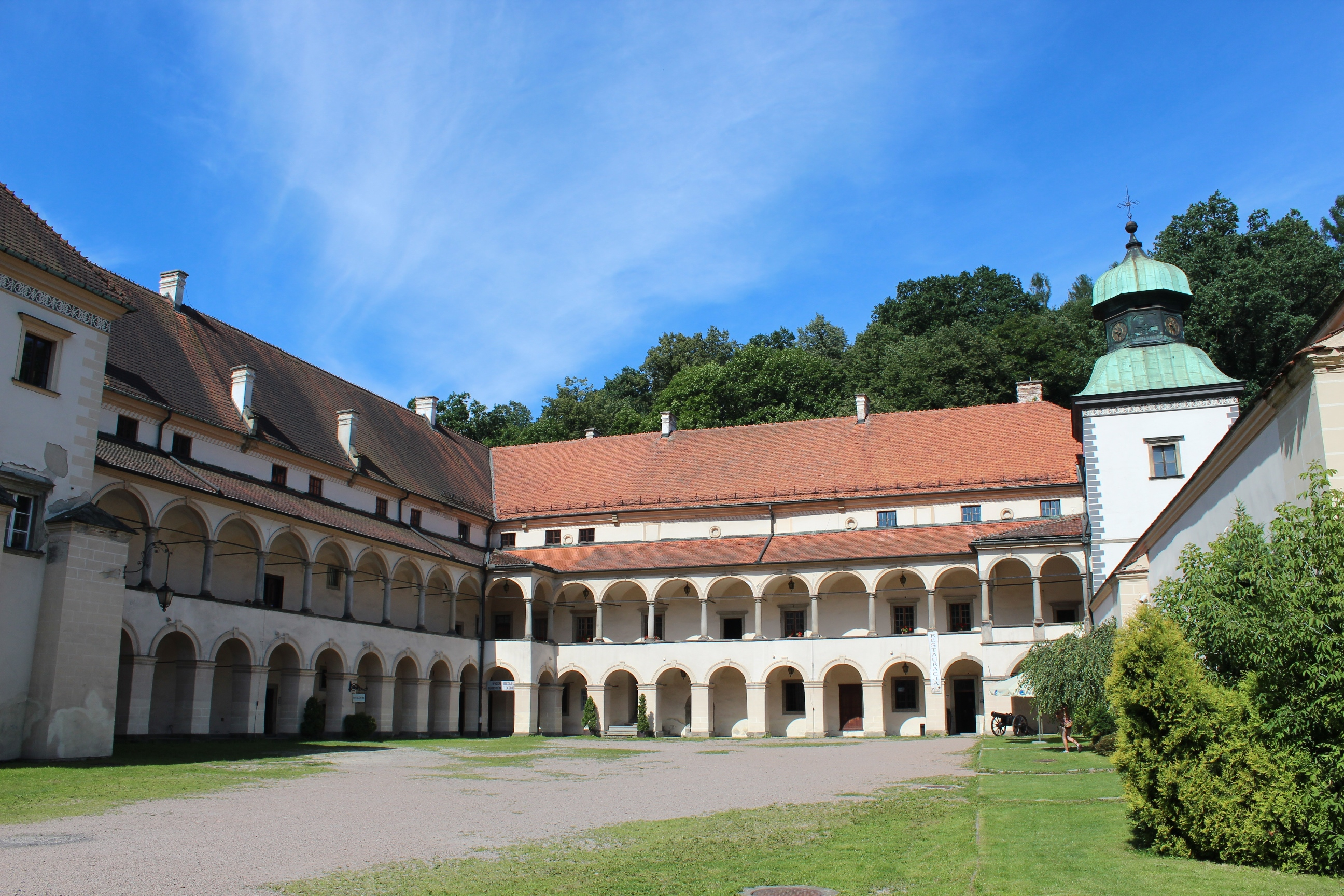
Sucha Beskidzka Castle

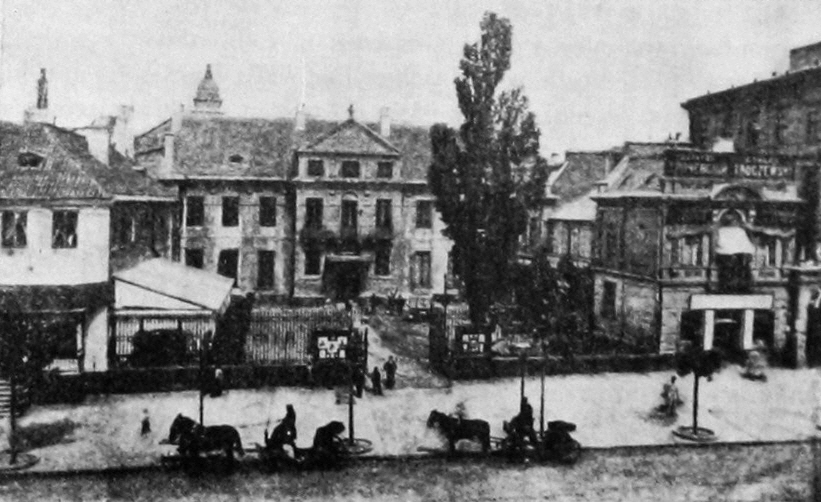
Tarnowski Palace in Warsaw

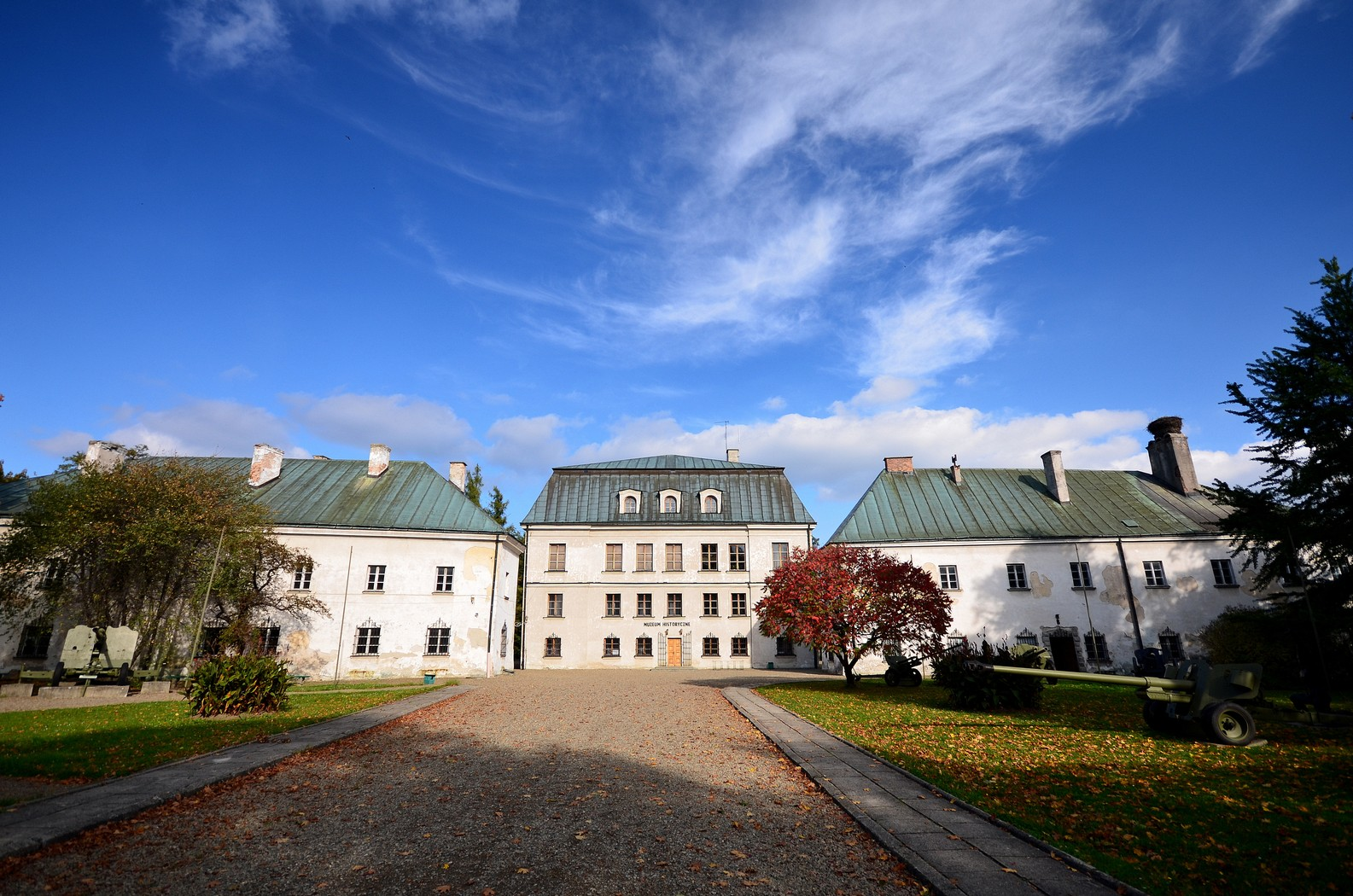
Dukla

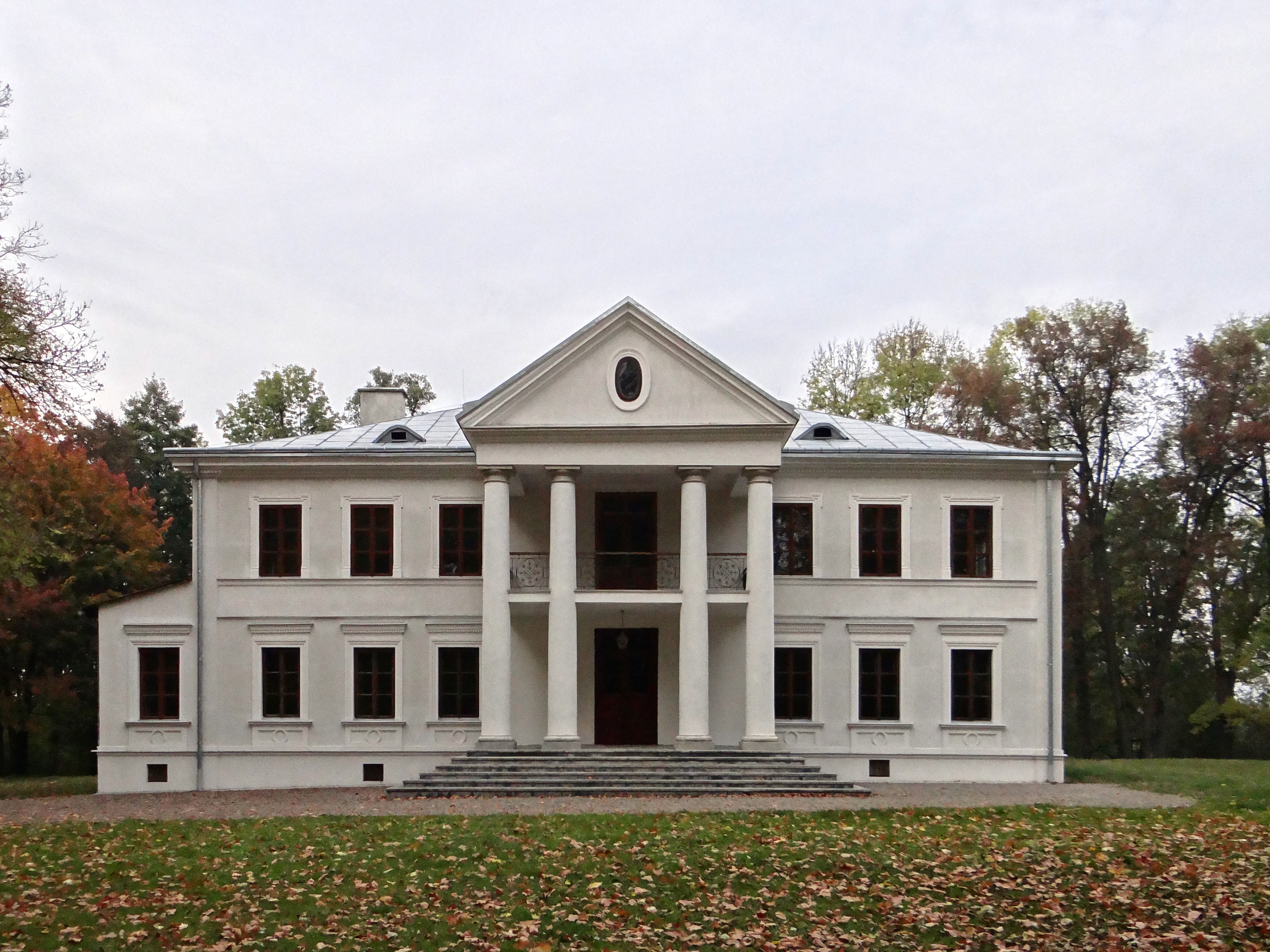
Rudnik nad Sanem

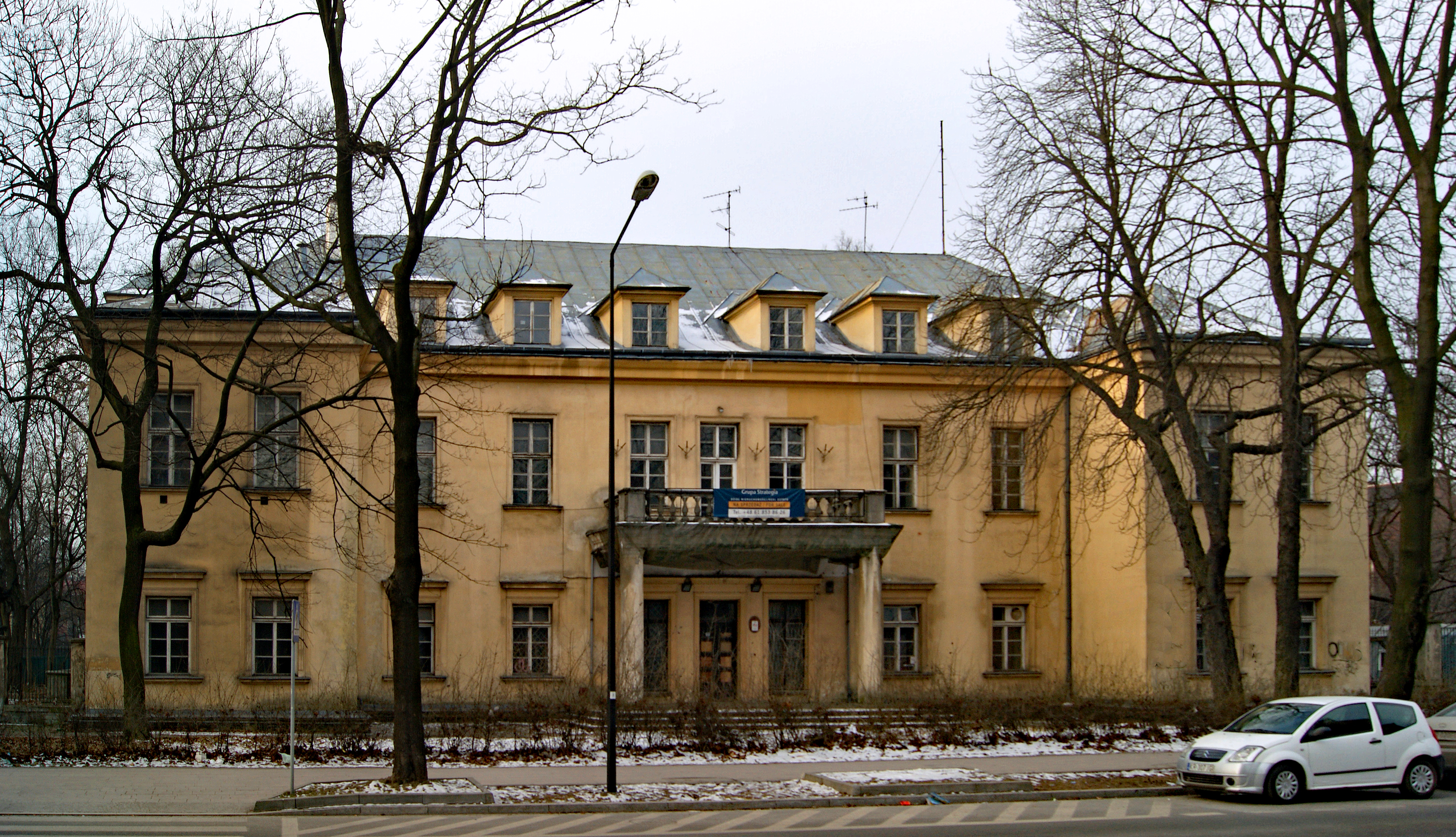
Szlak Manor in Kraków

== See also ==
- Tarnobrzeg
- Melsztyn
- Jarosław
- Przeworsk
- Sambor
- Ternopil
- Rzochów
- Chorzelów
- Krasnobród
- Końskie
- Wielopolski Palace
- Kachanivka Palace
