= Spytko III of Melsztyn =

Polish nobleman

Spytek z Melsztyna
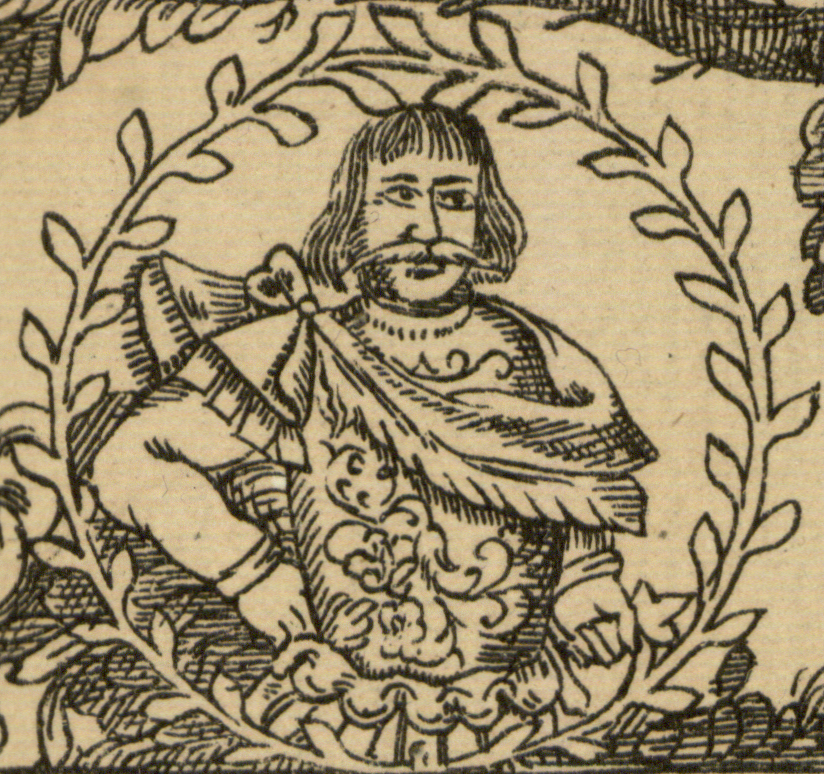
- Coat of arms: Leliwa
- Born: 1398
- Died: 5 May 1439 (aged 40–41); Battle of Grotniki; Grotniki Duże, Poland
- Noble family: Tarnowski
- Spouse: Beatrycza Szamotulska
- Issue: Dorota Tarnowska-Melsztyńska; Jan Tarnowski-Melsztyński; Spytek Tarnowski-Melsztyński
- Father: Spytko II of Melsztyn
- Mother: Elizabeth Lackfi

Spytek of Melsztyn (Polish: Spytek z Melsztyna, 1398–1439), also known as Spytko, was a Polish Knight and a strong supporter of Polish cooperation with the Hussite movement.

== Biography ==
Spytek was the owner of Melsztyn estates and a castellan of Biecz. He was the son of Spytek of Melsztyn, voivode of Kraków.

He supported the plan for Władysław II Jagiełło's acceptance of the Czech crown from the Hussites. He supported pro-Hussite military expeditions of Sigismund Korybut to Bohemia in the years 1422-1427. After Jagiełło's death in 1434 he was the leader of the opposition against the political influences of Bishop of Kraków, Zbigniew Oleśnicki during the early years of the reign of young King Władysław III. Spytek's opposition to Oleśnicki was less personal and more an expression of sympathy with Czech Hussitism, and of opposition to the wealth and influence of the Catholic Church in Poland. During Church synods of Warka (1434), Sieradz and Piotrkow (1435) he spoke in favor of the abolishing of the Peter's Pence in Poland.

In 1439 he organized the Korczyn Confederation (also known as "Confederation of Spytko of Melsztyn") against Oleśnicki. This was a reaction to Oleśnicki 's formation of an earlier anti-Hussite confederation there. His actions were condemned by the royal court, and he lost much support. Following a military escalation of the conflict, he died in the Battle of Grotniki on 4 May 1439. Spytek's defeat meant also the defeat of the Hussite cause in Poland.

His legacy lay in King Władysław's realization that the lesser nobility could be played off against the power of the great magnates and that the Catholic Church could be reigned in.
