= Rafał of Tarnów =

Polish nobleman (c. 1330 – 1373)

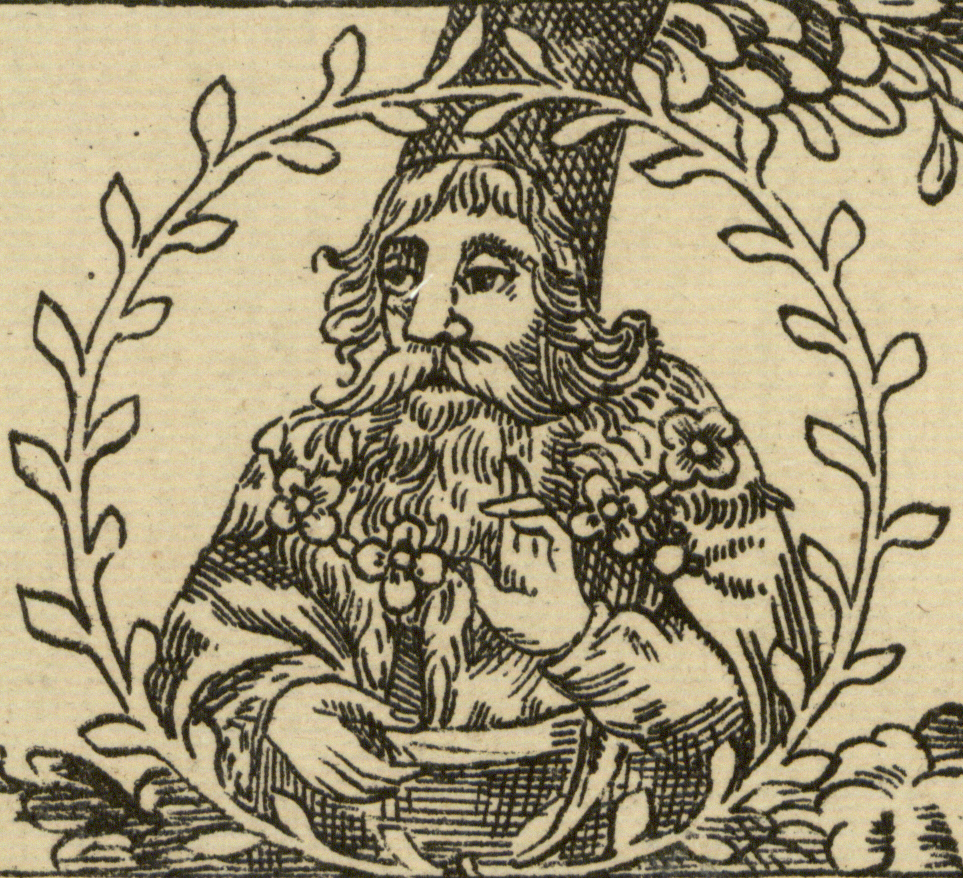
- Coat of arms: Leliwa
- Born: c. 1330; Tarnów
- Died: 7 December 1373
- Noble family: Tarnowski
- Consort: Dzierżka of Wielowieś
- Father: Spytek of Melsztyn
- Mother: Stanisława of Bogoria and Skotnik

Rafał of Tarnów (Polish: Rafał z Tarnowa or Rafał Tarnowski; c. 1330 – 7 December 1373) was a Polish nobleman (szlachcic)

Rafał was the owner of Tarnów and Wielowieś estates and served as Podkomorzy of Sandomierz since 1355 and castellan of Wisnice since 1368.

He expanded his estates among others in Sandomierz Land, Wielowieś and Dzików.

He had one wife, Dzierżka of Wielowieś, and two children, Jan of Tarnów and Spytek of Tarnów.
