= Waleria Tarnowska =

Polish painter and patron of the arts (1782–1849)

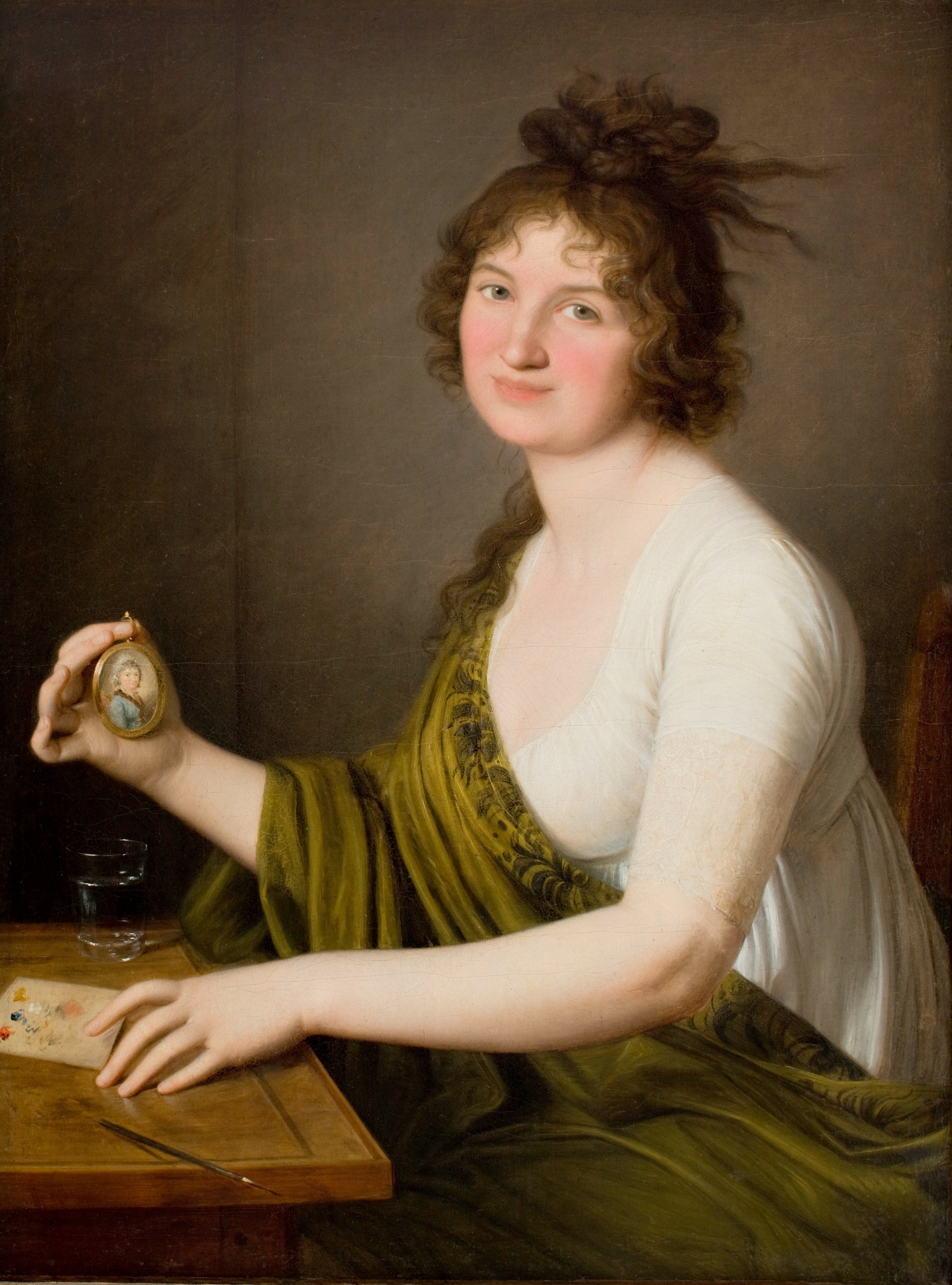
- Portret Walerii ze Stroynowskich Tarnowskiej by Domenico del Frate, 1805-1806, painting in collection of National Museum in Cracow (MNK XII-A-580)
- Born: Waleria Stroynowska; December 9, 1782; Horochów
- Died: December 9, 1849 (aged 67); Dzików, Austrian Empire
- Education: Constantino Villani, Wincenty de Lesseur, Therese Maron, Antonio Cherubini, Domenico del Frate, Filippo Giacomo Remondini
- Known for: Painting, drawing
- Movement: Miniatures, Religious painting

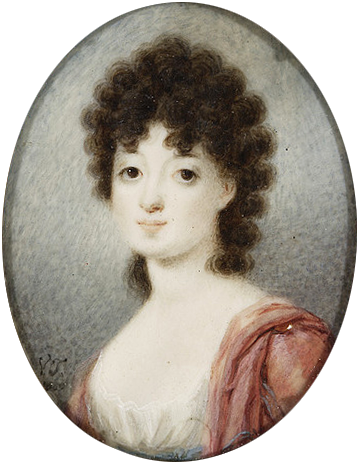
Zofia z Czartoryskich Zamoyska by Waleria Tarnowska, miniature, 1803, in collection of National Museum in Warsaw

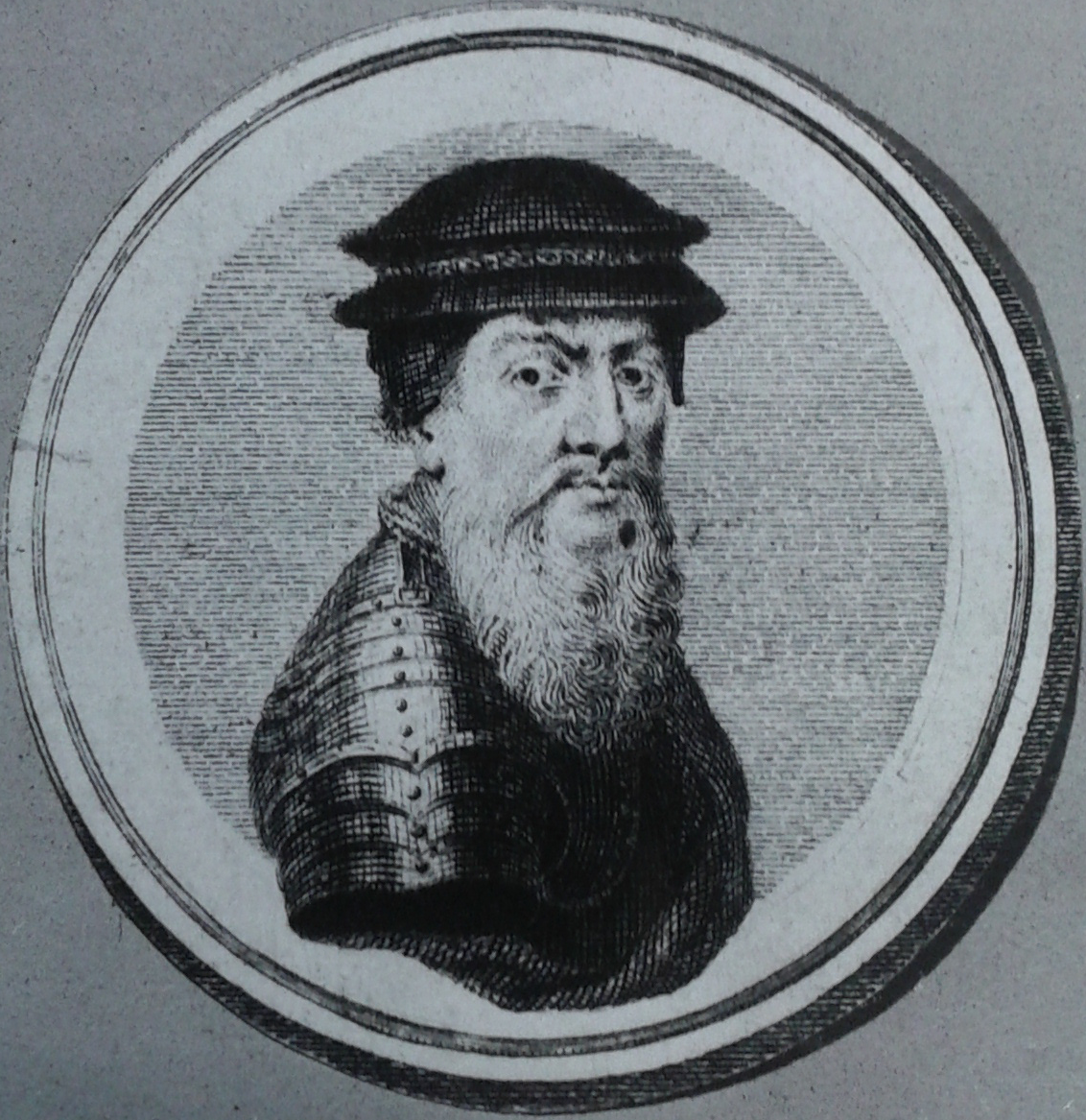
Portrait of Jan Tarnowski - copperplate by Jan Ligber, before 1814, on basis of miniature by Waleria Tarnowska

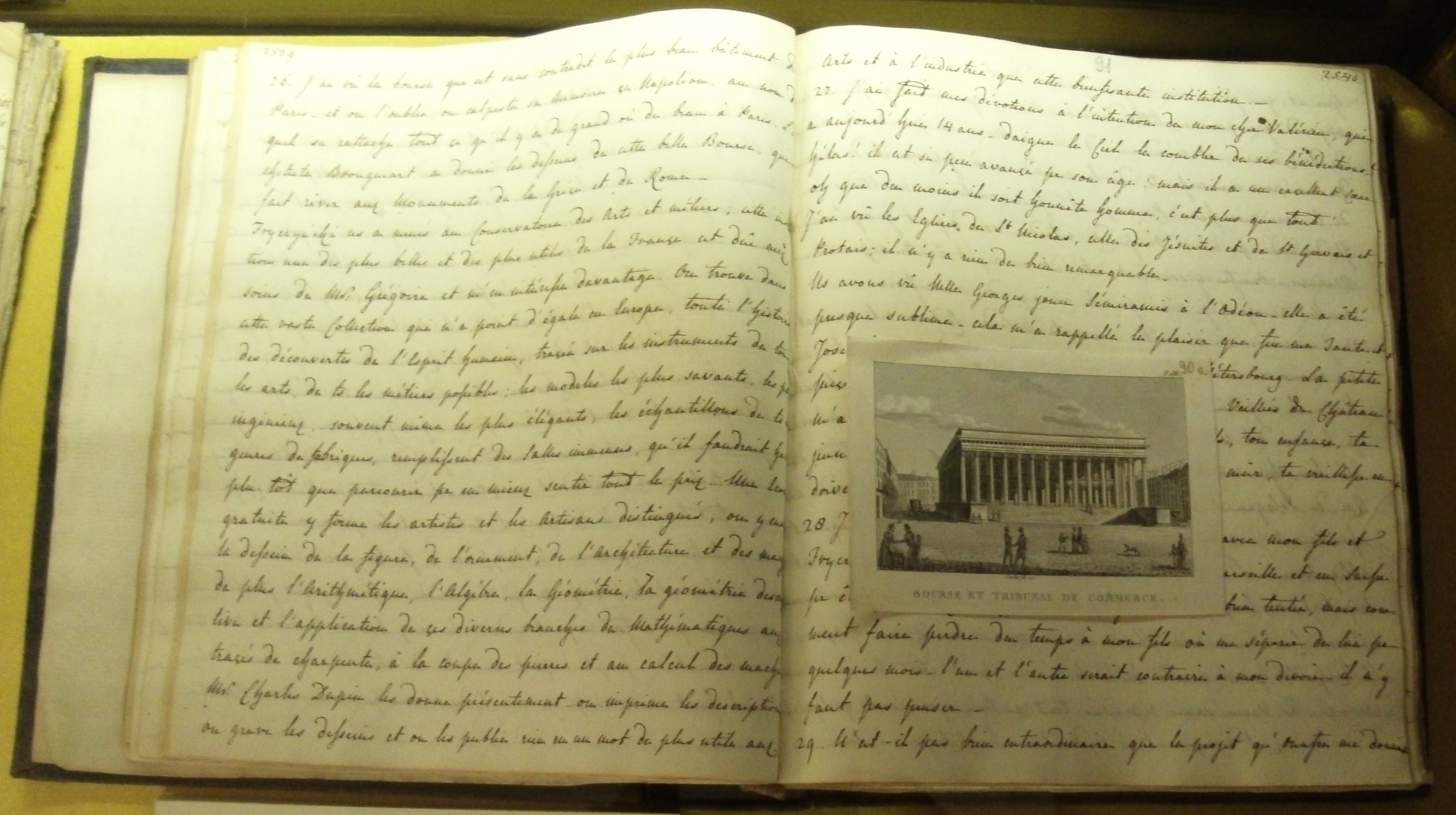
Mon Journal 1804-1838 by Waleria Tarnowska, manuscript in Dzików Castle

Waleria Tarnowska (December 9, 1782, – November 23, 1849) was a Polish painter and a patron of the arts. She is known for her miniatures, numerous portraits, religious paintings and drawings.

== Personal life ==
Waleria Tarnowska was a daughter of Walerian Stroynowski and Aleksandra Tarnowska. On 7 September 1800, Waleria married Jan Feliks Tarnowski. She was the mother of Kazimierz, Rozalia, Jan Bogdan, Maria Felicja, Walerian, Rozalia, Wiktoria, Anna and Tadeusz Antoni; and the grandmother of Jan Dzierżysław Tarnowski, Stanisław „Czarny”, Stanisław „Biały” and Władysław. Waleria was educated at home by governesses, and her teachers also included the archaeologist and historian Wawrzyniec Surowiecki, and the professor of chemistry and medicine Jędrzej Śniadecki, as well as her uncle, Hieronim Stroynowski, bishop and Rector of Vilnius University.

Waleria together with her husband Jan Felix created the collection of paintings, drawings, sculptures, books and antiquities at Dzików, which included paintings by Lorenzo Lotto, Guercino, Guido Reni, Rembrandt, Annibale Carracci, Salvator Rosa, Hans Holbein the Younger, Anthony van Dyck, Anton Raphael Mengs, Bernini, Antonio Canova.

== Career ==
First Waleria studied painting for three years in Horochów with Constantino Villani and the miniaturist de Hoflize, then with Wincenty de Lesseur 1800-1804 in Dzików and 1810 in Warsaw, at miniaturist Therese Maron and her husband, Antonio Cherubini in Rome, Domenico del Frate (who in 1806 depicted portraits of members of her family, and painted the Virgin Mary in the chapel in Dzików). Her next teacher was Filippo Giacomo Remondini; she then studied in Paris from 1824 to 1826.

=== Paintings and drawings ===
Waleria was a miniaturist, painting portraits and religious subjects. She often signed her works "V. T.", and depicted miniatures on ivory, usually with watercolour, sometimes with gouache and watercolour or only gouache. Her paintings are often miniature copies of paintings by other painters, and portraits of family members.

- Madonna w białym welonie (Madonna in white veil; She may be the artist of the copy of a lost painting by Giovanni Battista Salvi zw. the Sassoferrato)
- Madonna w błękitnej chuście (Madonna in blue scarf)
- Aleksandra z Tarnowskich Stroynowska (Waleria’s mother)
- Jan Bohdan Tarnowski (Waleria's son in children's age)
- Ks. Julian Antonowicz (father Antonowicz was Waleria’s husband's tutor and friend of both)
- Marianna z Tarnowskich hr. Scipio del Campo
- Rozalia Tarnowska (1803-1804, Waleria’s daughter)
- Portret Anny z Rakowskich hr. Bystry (c. 1805)
- Portret Joanny Grudzińskiej (portrait of wife of Grand Duke Konstantin Pavlovich)
- Portret Jana Feliksa Tarnowskiego (several miniatures with husband's effigy)
- Portret Waleryana Stroynowskiego (Waleria’s father portrait)
- Portret kobiety z książką (The woman's portrait with book (the copy of painting by painter from Netherlandic school in collection of Dzików Castle in Tarnobrzeg)
- Król Stefan Batory (King Stefan Batory)
- Konstanty Iwanowicz ks. Ostrogski (father-in-law of Zofia, daughter of hetman Jan Tarnowski)
- Napoleon I (as consul, miniature from 1804, on basis of the portrait by J. B. Isabey, lent by Letycja Buonaparte, which so pleased miniature, that she gave to medallion with her son's curl)
- Józefina de Beauhernais (Napoleon's wife)
- Magdalena pokutująca (Suffering Magdalene with skull and parchment)
- Maria Magdalena (with book and dish on balm)
- Zofia z Czartoryskich Zamoyska
- Izabela z Flemingów ks. Czartoryska
- Portret Jana Tarnowskiego (Hetman's portrait)
- Antonina Anna Krasińska (Zygmunt Krasiński grandmother)
- Portret Kryglerowej po hiszpańsku (Portrait Kryglerowej in Spanish)
- Józefa Czarnecka
- Czystość Józefa (Joseph's cleanness, the copy of painting by Carlo Cagnacci)
- Rysunek Proroka (Prophet, drawing)
- Stanisław Żółkiewski (drawing in yew frame)
- Święty Bernard (Saint Bernard)
- Chrystus (Christ, Salvator Mundi, the copy of painting by Guido Reni)
- Psyche i kupido (Psyche and cupid)
- Projekt monumentu zwieńczonego hełmem (The project of monument topped with helmet, 1824)

Before World War II, Waleria's miniatures, paintings and drawings were in family collections in Dzików Castle, Chorzelów, Rudnik nad Sanem, and Wiśniowa (the residence of the Mycielski family). Post-war, her work can be found in collections at the Polish Museum, Rapperswil, the National Museum in Warsaw and Cracow, the Castle Museum in Pszczyna and the Jagiellonian Library (drawings).

=== Diaries ===
- Mes voyages (A description of travel (1803-1804) written for daughter)
- Mes journal (diary, 1804-1838)

== See also ==
- List of Poles
- List of Polish painters

== Bibliography ==
=== Source in English ===
- Adam Zamoyski „Waleria Tarnowska” in: Jane Turner (ed.) „The Dictionary of Art”, Grove, Macmillan Publishers Limited, 1996, Vol. 30 (Summonte-Tinne), pp. 345–346.

=== Sources in Polish ===
- W. Batowski and M. Treter „Wystawa miniatur” Lvov, 1912 (illustrations).
- Jan Bołoz Antoniewicz „Katalog Wystawy sztuki polskiej 1764-1886”, Lvov, 1894, about Waleria as paintress pp. 114–116, positions 602-611; about portrait of Waleria by Leon Brzeziński (1849), pp. 186–187, position 923.
- Dorota Dec, Janusz Walek „Europejskie skarby Muzeum Narodowego z Muzeum Książąt Czartoryskich w Krakowie w Zamku Królewskim w Niepołomicach”, Muzeum w Niepołomicach, 2011, p. 113.
- Kazimiera Grottowa „Zbiory sztuki Jana Feliksa i Walerii Tarnowskich w Dzikowie, 1803-1849”, Zakład Narodowy im. Ossolińskich, Wroclaw, 1957, pp. 20, 40-43, 47-50, 52-53 (letter by Antonio Canova from April 28, 1804), 54-57, 59-64, 68, 71-75, 77, 79, 85-87, 90-94, 101, 103, 113, 114, 118, 130, 133-135, 136, 137.
- Aleksandra Janas „Kolekcja dzikowska hr. Tarnowskich”, ed. Muzeum Historyczne Miasta Tarnobrzega, Tarnobrzeg, 2006.
- Halina Kamińska-Krassowska „Miniatury Wincentego Lesseura i Walerii Tarnowskiej z dawnej kolekcji Tarnowskich z Dzikowa w zbiorach Muzeum Polskiego w Rapperswilu : Katalog wystawy – Miniaturen von Wincenty Lesseur und Waleria Tarnowska aus der ehemaligen Tarnowski-Sammlung in Dzików im Polenmuseum Rapperswil : Ausstellungskatalog”, Royal Castle in Warsaw, Warsaw, 1994.
- Jerzy Kieszkowski „W czasy naszych ojców. „Wystawa Amatorów” w Wiedniu w lutym i w marcu 1913 r.” in: „Przegląd Polski”, Cracow, Vol. 190, fascicle IV (October 1913), pp. 18–20, and 4 illustration after p. 18.
- Michał Marczak „Biblioteka Tarnowskich w Dzikowie”, Biblioteka Dzikowska, Cracow, 1921.
- Bożena Mazurkowa „Nowy grand tour w świetle Mes voyages Walerii Tarnowskiej” – article in: „Polski Grand Tour w XVIII i początkach XIX wieku”, Uniwersytet Śląski w Katowicach, Katowice, 2014, pp. 151–182.
- Jerzy Mycielski „Sto lat dziejów malarstwa polskiego 1760-1860”, Cracow, 1896, pp. 64–66.
- Jacek Paulinek „Ex collectione Dzikoviana : zbiory hrabiów Tarnowskich z Dzikowa : katalog wystawy, Biblioteka Narodowa, 17 sierpnia-12 października 2008”, Biblioteka Narodowa, Warsaw, 2008, pp. II-IV, VI, VIII, X, XXI-XXII, XXIV, XXVI-XXX, XXXIII, XXXV-XXXVIII, XL, XLII-XLIII, LXI; illustrations, str. 59 position 99 (“Portrait Walerii Tarnowskiej” by Fr. X. Lampi, 1825); paintings by Waleria: p. 62 position 107-108, p. 67 position 123, p. 70 position 134.
- Edward Rastawiecki „Słownik malarzów polskich, 1857, Vol. 3, pp. 423-425 and p. 176, position 15.
- Maria Śledzianowska „Zainteresowania kolekcjonerskie Teofili Konstancji z Radziwiłłów Morawskiej, Walerii ze Stroynowskich Tarnowskiej i Izabeli z Flemingów Czartoryskiej” article in: „Kwartalnik Historii Nauki i Techniki”, annual set 57, issue 3/4, 2012, pp. 185–187 i 191.
- Stanisław Wasylewski „Portrety pań wytwornych”, Inicjał Andrzej Pałacz, Warsaw, 2011.
- Krzysztof Załęski „Waleria Tarnowska” in: „Artystki polskie. Katalog wystawy”, Muzeum Narodowe w Warszawie, Warsaw, 1991, p. 344-345, ill. 796-798.
- Maria Zientara „Artystki polskie i ich sztuka od XVI do XIX wieku” in: “Krzysztofory: Zeszyty historyczne Muzeum Historycznego Miasta Krakowa”, Zeszyt 24, Cracow, 2006, p. 52.
- „Podróż polki do Włoch w epoce Napoleońskiej, 1803-1804.” in: „Przegląd Polski”, Cracow, Vol. 123, fascicle VII (January 1897), issue 367, pp. 69–103.
- „Stary portret. Wystawa dzieł polskich i obcych, wykonanych do roku 1930 a znajdujących się w zbirach prywatnych w obrębie województwa krakowskiego”, Cracow, 1930, nr 96, p. 19.
- „Wspomnienie pośmiertne dwóch matron polskich Anny hrabiny Małachowskiej i Walerii hrabiny Tarnowskiej”, druk Czas, Cracow, pp. 11–19.

=== Sources in German ===
- Leo R. Schidlof „Die Bildnisminiatur in Frankreich im XVII, XVIII, und XIX Jahrhundert. Als Anhang: Allgemeines Lexicon der Miniaturisten aller Länder.”, publ. Beyer, Vienna, 1911; this same author „La miniature en Europe Aux 16e, 17e, 18e et 19e siècles”, Akademische Druck – U. Verlagsanstalt, Graz, 1964, Vol. II (M-Z), p. 819.
- „Saur Allgemaines Küstlerlexikon: Bio-bibliographiher index”, K.G. Saur, Monachium-Lipsk, 2000, Vol. 9 (Schinz-Torricelli), p. 29, Th. XXXII.
- „Saur Allgemaines Küstlerlexikon: Bio-bibliographiher index”, K.G. Saur, Monachium-Lipsk, 2000, Vol. 9 (Schinz-Torricelli), p. 629.
- Z. Batowski „Tarnowska, Waleria” in: Ulrich Thieme, Felix Becker „Allgemeines Lexicon der bildenden künstler von der antike bis zur gegenwart”, publ. Hans. Vollmer, print. A. Seemann, Leipzig, 1938, Vol. XXXII, p. 448.

=== Sources in French ===
- Emmanuel-Charles Bénézit „Dictionaire critique et documentaire des Peintres, Sculpteurs, Dessinateurs et Graveurs” (9 wydanie), Librairie Gründ, 1966, Vol. 8, p. 225; this same author „Dictionary of Artist”, tom 13 (Sommer-Valverane), Gründ, Paris, 2006, p. 702.
- Elena Gretchanaia, Alexandre Stroev „La francophonie europeenne aux XVIIIe-XIXe siecles: Perspectives Litteraires, Historiues et Culturalles”, P.I.E.-Peter Lang S.A., Brüssel, 2012.
- Jerzy Mycielski „Une Jeune Polonaise en Italie à l’époque du Premier Consul” w: „La Revue de Pologne”, Paryż-Warszaw, 1924-1926; this same author „Journal du voyage en Italie”, 1924-1926.
- Michel Braud, "Les journaux de Waleria Tarnowska et Eliza Michalowska", Genesis n° 32/11, 2011, p. 177-180.
- Michel Braud, "Le voyage en France de la comtesse Tarnowska", dans A. Guyot et C. Massol (dir.), Voyager en France au temps du romantisme, Grenoble, Ellug, 2003, p. 169-180.
- Michel Braud, "Religion, amour conjugal et amour maternel dans le journal (1803-1838) de la comtesse Waleria Tarnowska" suivi de "Extraits du journal de Waleria Tarnowska", dans Maurice Daumas (dir.) Amour divin, amour mondain dans les écrits du for privé de la fin du Moyen Âge à 1914, Pau, Cairn, 2011, p. 177-180.
- Michel Braud, "L'usage des langues dans le journal intime de la comtesse Tarnowska", dans Elena Gretchanaia, Alexandre Stroef et Catherine Viollet (dir.), La Francophonie européenne aux XVIIIe-XIXe siècles: perspectives littéraires, historiques, culturelles, Peter Lang, 2012, p. 173-182.

=== Sources in Italian ===
- Antonio Canova „Letter : Roma, to Valeria, contessa Tarnowska, née Stroynowska” (April 14, 1804, the letter from Antonio Canova from Rome to Waleria in collection of Metropolitan Museum of Art in New York.
