= Jan of Melsztyn =

14th-century Polish nobleman

- Coat of arms: Leliwa
- Born: c. 1326
- Died: 23 March 1381
- Family: Tarnowski
- Consort: Zofia of Książ
- Issue: Spytek of Melsztyn; Elżbieta of Melsztyn
- Father: Spytek of Melsztyn
- Mother: Stanisława of Bogoria and Skotnik

Jan of Melsztyn (Polish: Jan z Melsztyna or Jan Melsztyński) was a Polish nobleman (szlachcic).

Jan was owner of Melsztyn and Książ estates. He served as Łowczy of Kraków since 1339, castellan of Wojnice since 1345, voivode of the Sandomierz Voivodeship since 1361 and castellan of Kraków since 1360 or 1366.

His granddaughter Elizabeth Granowska (born to his daughter, Jadwiga) became Queen consort of Poland.

During his reign he sponsored various architectural projects; in Kazimierz, for instance, he donated 300 pounds of silver in order to finish the choir of St. Catharine's Church.
