= Jan of Tarnów (1367–1433) =

Polish nobleman

- Coat of arms: Leliwa
- Born: c. 1367; Tarnów
- Died: August 17, 1433; Tarnów
- Family: Tarnowski
- Consort: Elżbieta ze Sternberka
- Issue: Katarzyna Tarnowska; Jan Feliks Tarnowski; Jan Rafał Tarnowski; Jan Amor Młodszy Tarnowski; Jan Amor Starszy Tarnowski; Jan Gratus Tarnowski
- Father: Jan of Tarnów
- Mother: Katarzyna

Jan of Tarnów (Polish: Jan z Tarnowa) (1367–1433) was a Polish nobleman (szlachcic).

Jan was owner of Tarnów and Wielowieś estates. He became dean of Kraków from September 27, 1398, to November 12, 1409, and voivode of Kraków Voivodeship in 1409.

Like his brother Spytek, Jan commanded one of the Leliwa clan banners at the Battle of Grunwald in 1410.
