= Jan of Tarnów =

Polish nobleman (c. 1349 – 1409)

Jan of Tarnow
- Coat of arms: Leliwa
- Born: c. 1349; Tarnów
- Died: 13 May 1409; Tarnów
- Family: House of Tarnowski
- Consort: Katarzyna
- Issue: Jan of Tarnów; Rafał of Tarnów; Spytek of Tarnów and Jarosław; Dorota of Tarnów
- Father: Rafał of Tarnów
- Mother: Dzierżka of Wielowieś

Jan of Tarnów (Polish: Jan z Tarnowa equally Jan Tarnowski as well as Jan Tarnowski z Tarnowa; c. 1349 – 1409) was a Polish nobleman (szlachcic) from the Lesser Poland region.

Jan was owner of Tarnów, Wielowieś and Jarosław estates. He was Podkomorzy of Sandomierz before 1368, Court Marshal before 1370, Crown Grand Marshal before 1373, starosta of Radom before 1376, castellan of Sandomierz before 1377, voivode of Sandomierz before 1385, starosta of Sandomierz before 1386, General Starost of Ruthenia before 1387, castellan of Kraków and starosta of Kraków in 1406.

In 1401, he was a signatory to the Pact of Vilnius and Radom. His sons Jan and Spytek fought in the Battle of Grunwald in 1410.
