= Wincenty de Lesseur =

Polish artist (1745–1813)

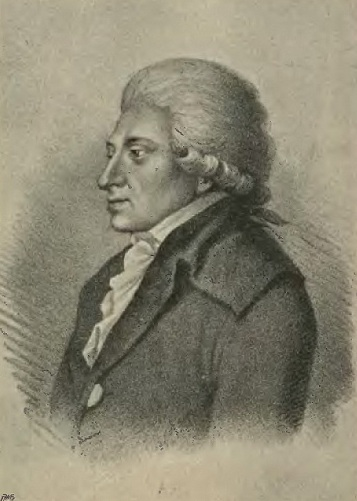
Wincenty de Lesseur; portrait by Jan Feliks Piwarski.

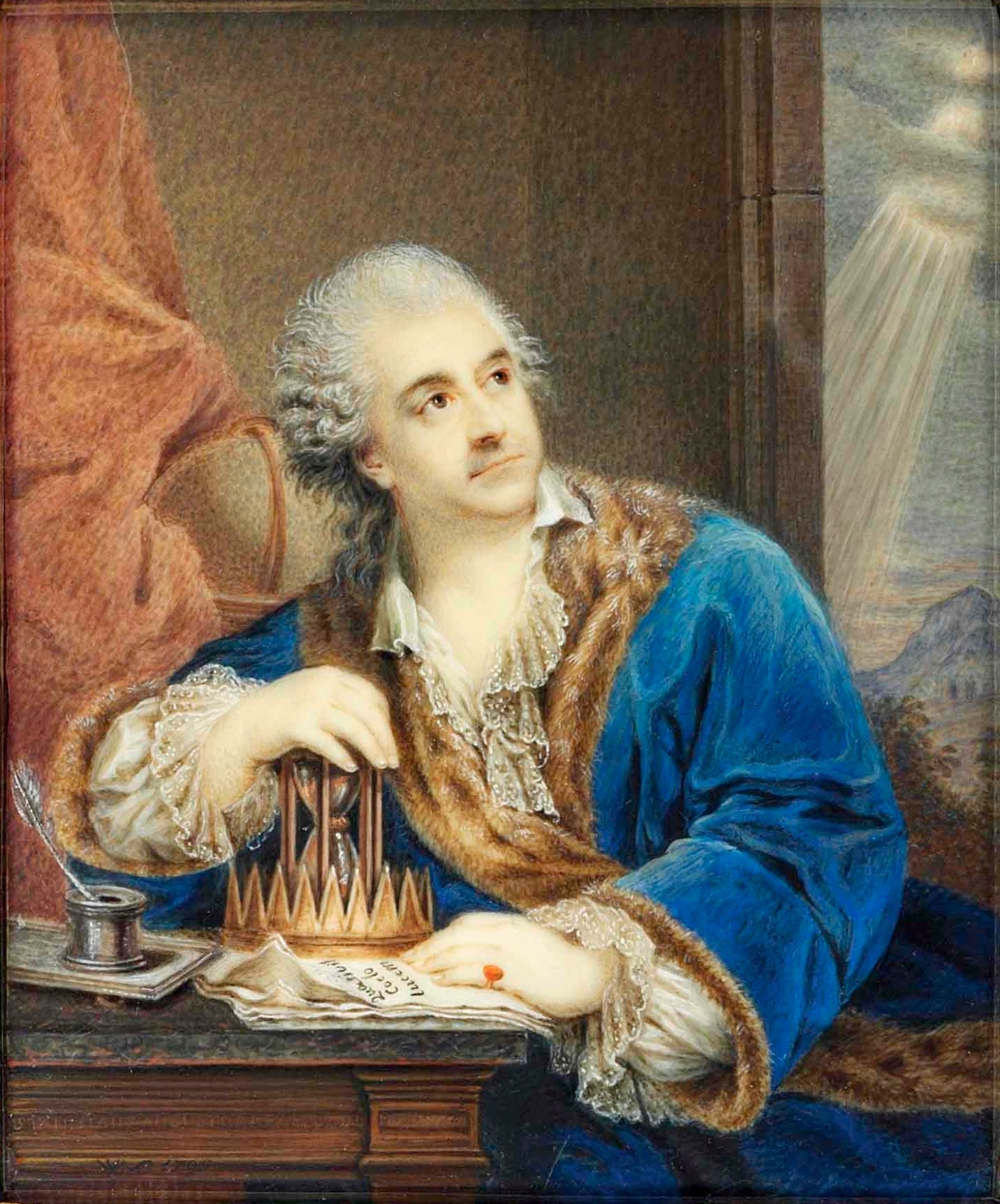
Portrait of King Stanisław August with an Hourglass.

Wincenty Fryderyk de Lesseur, or Lesserowicz (1745, Warsaw – 31 May 1813, Warsaw) was a Polish painter, miniaturist, pastelist and caricaturist.

== Biography ==
His father was a French army officer, stationed in Warsaw after the War of the Polish Succession. He received formal art education from Marcello and Johanna Bacciarelli. During a brief stay in Vienna, he worked with Heinrich Füger.

His primary patron (and customer) was King Stanisław August Poniatowski. After 1787, he served as a chamberlain at the court. By 1804, he was sufficiently well-off to settle on his own small property near Kozery.

He was renowned for his ability to create small watercolors or gouaches on ivory, using a pointillistic style that created the effect of smoothness.

In addition to portraits of the King, he painted portraits of other European monarchs, national heroes, artists, scholars, and aristocratic families and their friends. He also made miniature copies of the works of Bacciarelli, Josef Grassi and Jan Chrzciciel Lampi.

Among his students were Maciej Topolski and Waleria Tarnowska. A large collection of his miniatures which was owned by the Tarnowski family may now be seen at the Polish Museum, Rapperswil.
