= Jan "Ciężki" Tarnowski =

Polish nobleman (c. 1479 – 1527)

- Born: c. 1479
- Died: 1527
- Noble family: Tarnowski
- Spouses: (?) Kobylańska; Agnieszka Beata Tęczyńska
- Father: Jan Feliks Tarnowski
- Mother: Katarzyna Ligęza

Jan "Ciężki" Tarnowski (c. 147 9– 1527) was a Polish nobleman (szlachcic).

Jan was castellan of Biecz and Sącz, starost of Pilzno. He had one child, Dorota Tarnowska.
