= Jan Feliks "Szram" Tarnowski =

Polish nobleman (c. 1450 – 1507)

Jan Feliks Tarnowski
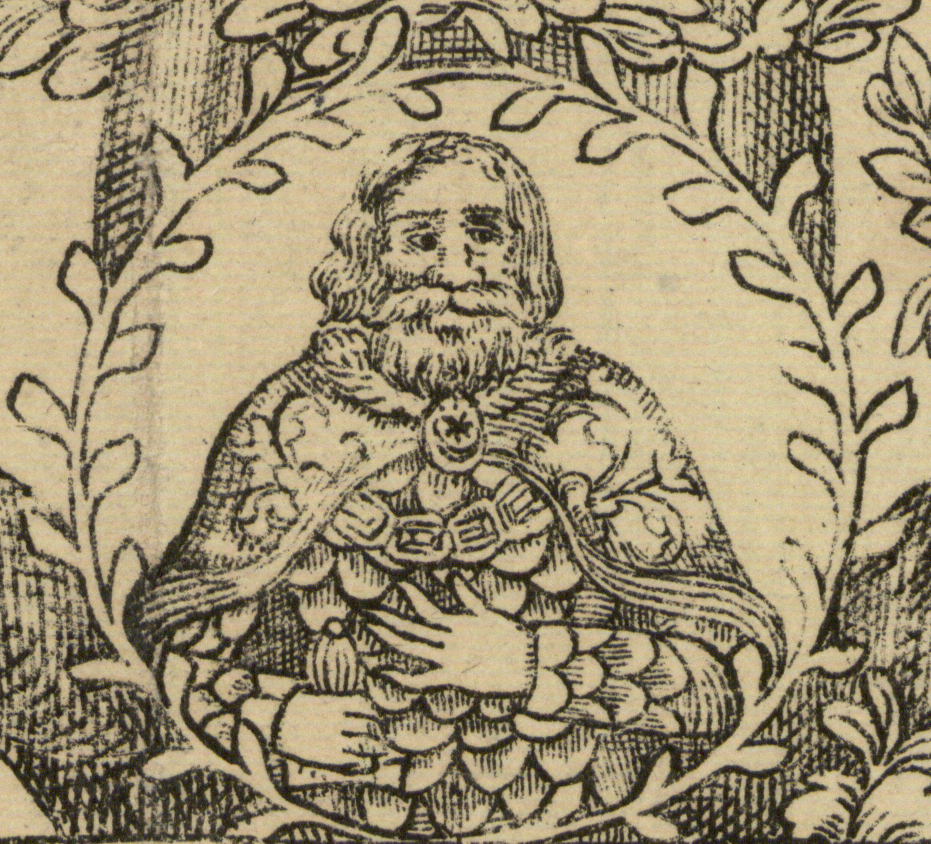
- Coat of arms: Leliwa
- Born: c. 1450; Wielowieś
- Died: 21 March 1507 (aged 35); Wielowieś
- Family: Tarnowski
- Consort: Katarzyna Ligęza
- Issue: Stanisław Tarnowski; Jan "Ciezki" Tarnowski; Jan Spytek Tarnowski
- Father: Jan Feliks Tarnowski Sr.
- Mother: Anna Oleśnicka

Jan Feliks "Szram" Tarnowski (c. 1450 – 21 March 1507) was a Polish nobleman (szlachcic).

== Biography ==
Jan Feliks was born c. 1450 in Wielowieś to Jan Feliks Tarnowski Sr. and Anna Oleśnicka.

Jan Feliks was owner of Wielowieś, Rzochów and Wadowice estates. He was Chorąży of Kraków from 20 February 1484, starost of Belz from 28 December 1485, Stolnik of the Royal court from 27 May 1494, castellan of Lublin from 27 December 1497, voivode of Lublin Voivodeship before 28 May 1499, voivode of Sandomierz Voivodeship from 6 March 1501, voivode of Kraków Voivodeship and starost of Horodło from 1 September 1505.

He married Katarzyna Ligęza, with whom he had three children: Stanisław Tarnowski, Jan "Ciezki" Tarnowski and Jan Spytek Tarnowski. He died on 21 March 1507.
