= Battle of Grotniki =

Final battle of the Hussite Wars

Coordinates: 50°18′10″N 20°48′38″E

- Part of Post-Hussite Wars
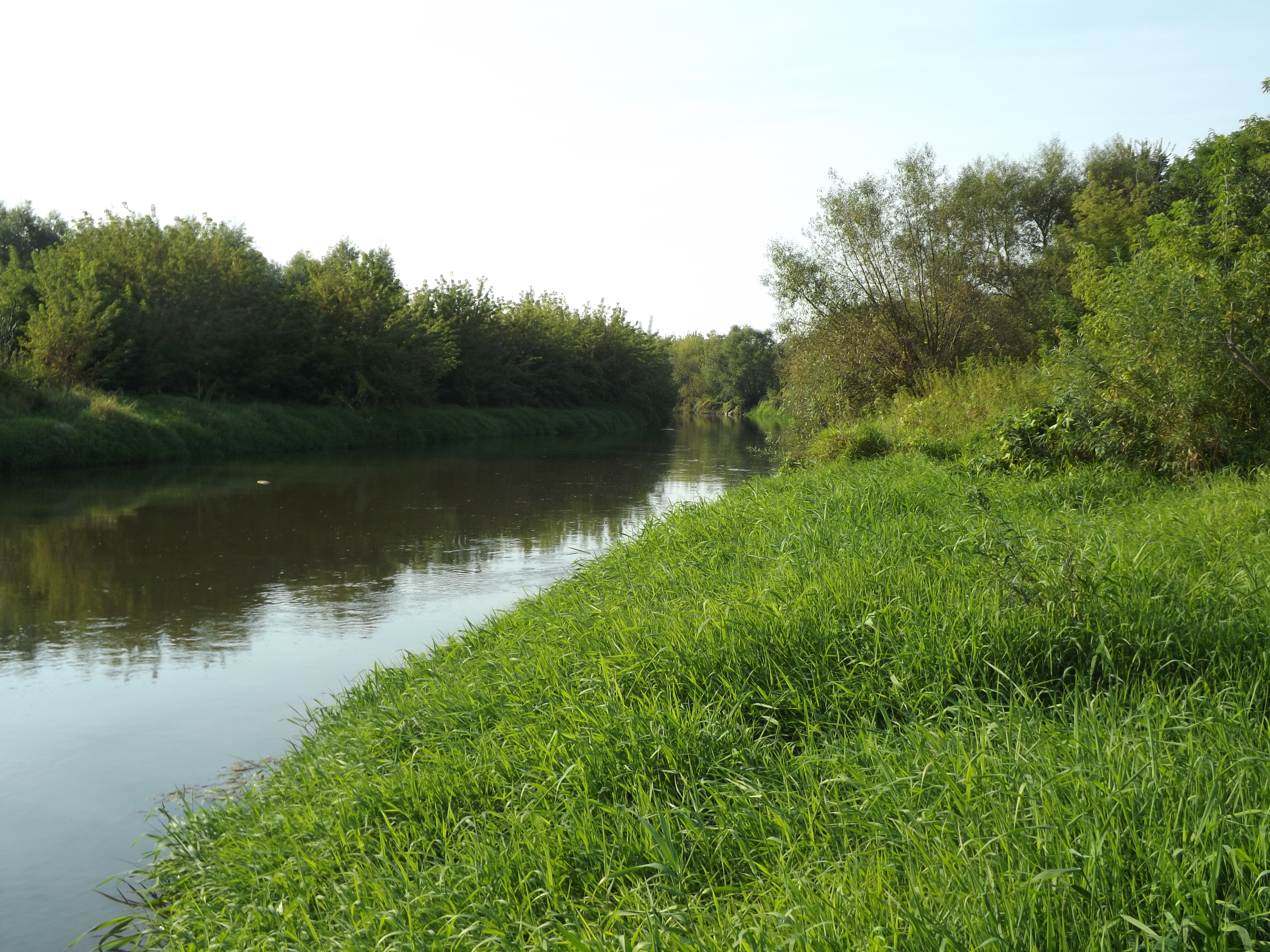
- Place of the Battle
Date	4 or 6 May 1439
Location	Grotniki, Poland
Result	Royal army victory

Belligerents
Polish Hussites	Polish Crown

Commanders and leaders
Spytko III of Melsztyn †	Jan Hińcza of Rogów

The Battle of Grotniki took place either on 4 or 6 May 1439 in the vicinity of Grotniki Duże, a village near Nowy Korczyn, currently in Świętokrzyskie Voivodeship.

The battle was fought between the Hussite confederates under Spytko III of Melsztyn against the royal forces of King Władysław III of Poland under Hińcza of Rogów and the Polish regent, bishop Zbigniew Oleśnicki. The defeat of the non-Catholic forces marked the end of militant Hussite movement in Poland and the beginning of a complete consolidation of power in the Polish Kingdom, led by bishop Zbigniew.

== Bibliography ==
- Jan Długosz, Annales seu Cronicae incliti regni Poloniae, opera venerabili domini Ioanni Dlugossi, liber XI i XII, Warsaw 2001, page 202 - 206.
- Jazowski, Andrzej (2004). Od dziejów Środkowych Słowian do Orawy, Podhala i Spisza (in Polish). Wydawn. i Druk. Tow. Słowaków w Polsce. p. 66. ISBN 9788389707116.

=== Secondary sources ===
- Anna Sochacka "Konfederacja Spytka z Melsztyna z 1439r. Rozgrywka polityczna, czy ruch ideologiczny? " Rocznik Lubelski, vol XVI, Lublin 1973.
