= Spycimir =

Spycimir, also Spyćmier, Spyćmir, Spyćmierz, Spićymierz, etc., is an old Polish masculine given name. Etymology: spyci-: "in vain", -mir: "peace". Diminutives: Spytko, Spytek. Its name day is 26 April.

== Given name ==
- Walerian Spycimir Tarnowski (1811–1861), Polish count, father of Władysław Tarnowski
- Spytko I of Melsztyn, Spycimir Leliwita (14th century), Polish nobleman, castellan of Krakow, Sądecczyzna and Wiślica
- Spytko II of Melsztyn (died 1399), Polish nobleman, voivode of Krakow
- Spytko III of Melsztyn (1398–1439), Polish nobleman
- Spytko IV of Melsztyn (d. 1503), Polish nobleman, voivode of Krakow
- Spytek I of Jarosław (cca. 1367- 1435), Polish nobleman
- Spytek II of Jarosław (d. 1444), Polish nobleman
- Spytek III of Jarosław (cca. 1436–1519), Polish nobleman, voivode of Krakow
- Jan Spytek Tarnowski (d.1553), Polish nobleman and statesman
- Stanisław Spytek Tarnowski (1514–1568), Polish nobleman and statesman
- Spytek Wawrzyniec Jordan (1518–1568), Polish nobleman and statesman (Great Crown Treasurer, also castellan and voivode of several cities)
- Mikołaj Spytek Ligęza (c. 1562–1637), Polish–Lithuanian nobleman

== Surname ==
- Heather Spytek (born 1977), American model
- John Spytek, American footballer and football executive

== Places ==
- Spycimierz, a village in the Poddębice County, Łódź Voivodeship, Poland
- Spycimierz-Kolonia, a village in the Poddębice County, Łódź Voivodeship, Poland

== See also ==
- Spytimir, Czech variant
