= Elisabeth, Queen of Poland =

Elisabeth, Queen of Poland may refer to the following queens of Poland:

- Elizabeth of Bosnia
- Elizabeth Granowska
- Elizabeth of Austria (1436–1505)
- Elizabeth of Austria (1526–1545)
