= Convent of the Dominican Sisters, Tarnobrzeg =

Polish monastery

Coordinates: 50°38′11″N 21°44′52″E

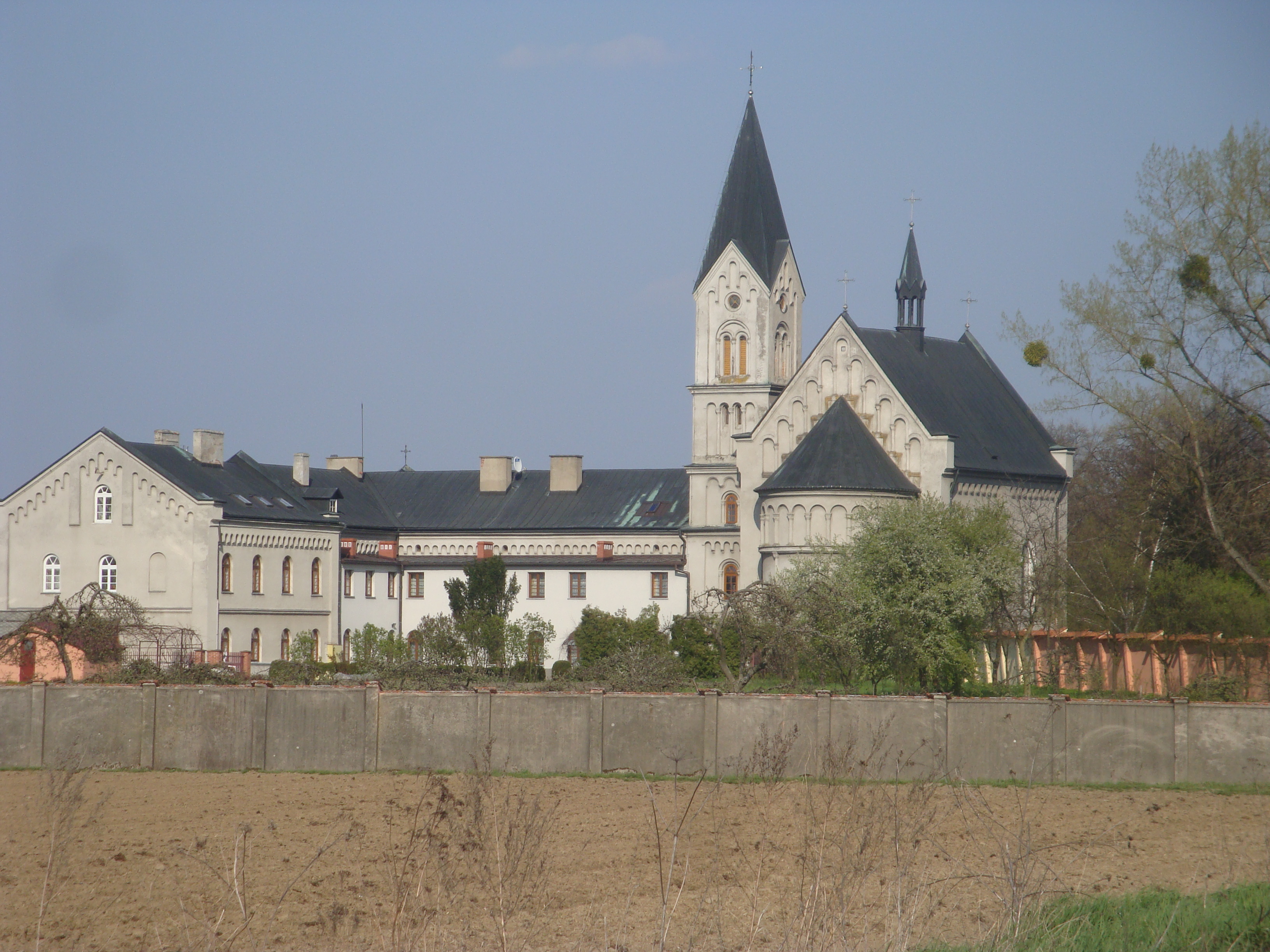
Monastery in Wielowieś

Monastery of Dominican Sisters in Tarnobrzeg - Sisters of St. Dominic monastic-church building complex built in the 19th century in Tarnobrzeg (Wielowieś), Poland. The monastery was founded by Mother Kolumba Białecka in 1861.

Mother Białecka's grave is on the site.

== See also ==
- Dominican Church and Convent of Assumption of Mary in Tarnobrzeg
