= Elizabeth Lackfi =

Hungarian noble lady

Elizabeth Lackfi (died 27 December 1428) was a Hungarian noble lady of the Lackfi family.

Elizabeth was daughter of Emeric I Lackfi, general starost of Ruthenia and Ban of Dalmatia (Transylvanian Voivodship) and of Hungary.

She was married to Spytek of Melsztyn, the voivode of Cracow, until his death in battle in 1399. Subsequently, she married Jan Piast, Duke of Ziębice.

She was listed as a matriculant of the University of Crakow, though this may have been honorary.

Children:

- Jadwiga z Melsztyna
- Dorota z Melsztyna
- Katarzyna z Melsztyna
- Spytek z Melsztyna
- Jan z Melsztyna i Rabsztyna

In Poland she became known as Elżbieta Węgierka or Elżbieta Bebek.
