= Spytek I of Jarosław =

Polish nobleman (c. 1367 – 1435)

Spytek of Tarnów and Jarosław
- Coat of arms: Leliwa
- Born: c. 1367
- Died: 27 March 1435
- Noble family: Tarnowski
- Consort: Sandochna ze Zgłobienia
- Father: Jan of Tarnów
- Mother: Katarzyna

Spytek of Tarnów and Jarosław (Polish: Spytek z Tarnowa i Jarosławia or Spytek Tarnowski-Jarosławski; c. 1367 – 1435) was a Polish nobleman (szlachcic).

Spytek was owner of Jarosław and Bełżyce. He became General Starost of Ruthenia in 1422 and voivode of the Sandomierz Voivodeship in 1433.

Like his brother Jan, Spytek commanded one of the Leliwa clan banners at the Battle of Grunwald in 1410.

He was married to Sandochna ze Zgłobienia and had four children: Jan Tarnowski-Jarosławski, Rafał Tarnowski-Jarosławski, Spytek Tarnowski-Jarosławski and Jadwiga Tarnowska-Jarosławska.

Jan started a new branch of the family, called the "Leliwita branch".
