= Rzochów =

- Coat of arms

- Location within Poland
- Coordinates: 50°15′N 21°29′E
- Country: Poland
- Voivodeship: Subcarpathian
- County: Mielec County
- Gmina: Mielec (urban gmina)

Rzochów [ˈʐɔxuf] is a historic old town, now a suburb of Mielec [ˈmjɛlɛt͡s], a city in the Subcarpathian Voivodeship (Województwo Podkarpackie) (since 1999). Mielec is a capital city of Mielec County.

== History ==
Rzochów was established between 1379 and 1382. At the beginning of the 15th century it was given city rights by king Władysław II Jagiełło. From about this time the town became known as a regional shoemaking centre. In the 19th century it was recorded that there were over 120 shoemakers, cordwainers and cobblers. The rail link between Dębicą and Sandomierz was completed in 1887.

In 1985 Rzochów was incorporated into Mielec. Its population was at the time about 910 people

Former streets of Rzochów
- Biedronki
- Dębicka
- Grabiowa
- Grzybowa
- Jagodowa
- Kolejowa
- Podleśna
- Rynek Rzochowski
- Rzochowska
- Św. Marka
- Wandy

=== Notable people ===
- Jan Feliks Tarnowski
- Father Józef Smaczniak – 1895–1942
