= Spytko II of Melsztyn =

14th-century Polish nobleman

Spytek of Melsztyn
- Duke of Podolia
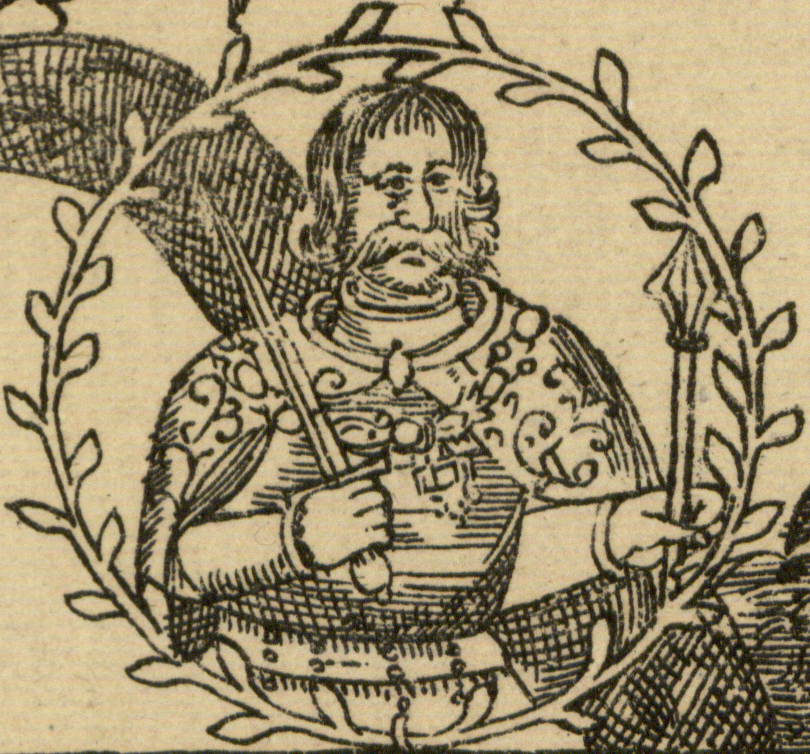
- Spytek of Melsztyn in: Genealogical tree families: Tarnowski, Melsztyński and Jarosławski by Augustinus Thille, Wojciech Kazimierz Jastrzębski; reprint Adam Piliński.

- Coat of arms: Leliwa
- Hereditary feudal duchy: 13 June 1395 – 12 August 1399
- Predecessor: Fyodor Koriatovych
- Successor: Skirgaila
- Born: c. 1364
- Died: 12 August 1399; Battle of the Vorskla River
- Noble family: Tarnowski
- Consort: Elizabeth Lackfi
- Father: Jan of Melsztyn
- Mother: Zofia of Książ

Spytek of Melsztyn (Polish: Spytek z Melsztyna or Spytko Melsztyński) was a Polish nobleman (szlachcic) of the Leliwa coat of arms.

Spytek was owner of Melsztyn estates. He served as Court Marshal since 1373, voivode of Kraków Voivodeship since 1381, starosta of Biecz since 1383 and Kraków since 1390.

Continuing the idea of Władysław I Łokietek he initiated the marriage of Queen Jadwiga of Poland and Grand Duke of Lithuania – to become king of Poland – Władysław II Jagiełło. In 1391–1396 Spytek reclaimed the Land of Wieluń and Orzeszków from Prince Władysław Opolczyk. On 13 June 1395 the King gave Spytek a part of Podolia as fief, Queen Jadwiga confirmed this on 10 July 1395. During the brief period when he was Duke of Podolia, his success led to the resignation Fyodor Koriatovych of the rights to Podolia and with Queen and King negotiated with Sigismund of Luxembourg (then King of Hungary) the border issue; and with the Bishop of Vilnius tried to prevent the secession of Lithuania from Polish–Lithuanian union, after acclamation by Vytautas the King of Lithuania on 12 October 1398. As Duke of Podolia also took part in the expedition against the Golden Horde, which ended the Battle of the Vorskla River.

He was married to Elizabeth Lackfi and had four children: Jadwiga of Melsztyn, Dorota of Melsztyn, Katarzyna of Melsztyn and Spytek of Melsztyn and Jan of Melsztyn († 1429).

Spytek died in fight with Tatars in the Battle of the Vorskla River in 1399. In the battle he had to show courage when the Lithuanian army, under the command of Vytautas, escaped.
