= Grotniki Duże =

- Village
- Location within Poland
- Coordinates: 50°18′10″N 20°48′38″E
- Country: Poland
- Voivodeship: Świętokrzyskie
- County: Busko
- Gmina: Nowy Korczyn
- Population: 193

Grotniki Duże [ɡrɔtˈniki ˈduʐɛ] is a village in the administrative district of Gmina Nowy Korczyn, within Busko County, Świętokrzyskie Voivodeship, in south-central Poland. It lies approximately 1 km (1 mi) north of Nowy Korczyn, 20 km (12 mi) south of Busko-Zdrój, and 66 km (41 mi) south of the regional capital Kielce.
