= Chorzelów =

- Village
- Location within Poland
- Coordinates: 50°21′N 21°27′E
- Country: Poland
- Voivodeship: Subcarpathian
- County: Mielec
- Gmina: Mielec
- Population: 2,728

Chorzelów [xɔˈʐɛluf] is a village in the administrative district of Gmina Mielec, within Mielec County, Subcarpathian Voivodeship, in south-eastern Poland.

== Climate ==
Chorzelów has a humid continental climate (Köppen Dfb).

Climate data for Chorzelów (1991–2020 normals, extremes 1961–present)
Month	Jan	Feb	Mar	Apr	May	Jun	Jul	Aug	Sep	Oct	Nov	Dec	Year
Record high °C (°F)	14.9 (58.8)	20.1 (68.2)	24.9 (76.8)	30.9 (87.6)	33.5 (92.3)	35.6 (96.1)	37.5 (99.5)	37.6 (99.7)	36.0 (96.8)	26.0 (78.8)	20.9 (69.6)	16.7 (62.1)	37.6 (99.7)
Mean maximum °C (°F)	9.0 (48.2)	11.6 (52.9)	17.8 (64.0)	24.7 (76.5)	28.4 (83.1)	31.2 (88.2)	33.1 (91.6)	33.0 (91.4)	27.8 (82.0)	22.9 (73.2)	16.1 (61.0)	10.1 (50.2)	34.1 (93.4)
Mean daily maximum °C (°F)	1.5 (34.7)	3.4 (38.1)	8.4 (47.1)	15.5 (59.9)	20.5 (68.9)	23.9 (75.0)	25.9 (78.6)	25.6 (78.1)	20.1 (68.2)	14.0 (57.2)	7.8 (46.0)	2.7 (36.9)	14.1 (57.4)
Daily mean °C (°F)	−1.9 (28.6)	−0.7 (30.7)	3.2 (37.8)	9.1 (48.4)	14.3 (57.7)	17.9 (64.2)	19.7 (67.5)	18.9 (66.0)	13.7 (56.7)	8.5 (47.3)	3.9 (39.0)	−0.5 (31.1)	8.8 (47.8)
Mean daily minimum °C (°F)	−5.0 (23.0)	−4.2 (24.4)	−1.1 (30.0)	3.1 (37.6)	7.9 (46.2)	11.4 (52.5)	13.2 (55.8)	12.5 (54.5)	8.3 (46.9)	4.1 (39.4)	0.5 (32.9)	−3.5 (25.7)	3.9 (39.0)
Mean minimum °C (°F)	−17.2 (1.0)	−14.8 (5.4)	−9.2 (15.4)	−3.5 (25.7)	0.8 (33.4)	5.4 (41.7)	7.6 (45.7)	6.4 (43.5)	1.1 (34.0)	−4.0 (24.8)	−7.4 (18.7)	−14.1 (6.6)	−19.8 (−3.6)
Record low °C (°F)	−31.2 (−24.2)	−31.2 (−24.2)	−27.2 (−17.0)	−7.5 (18.5)	−3.8 (25.2)	−0.4 (31.3)	2.8 (37.0)	2.3 (36.1)	−3.9 (25.0)	−9.2 (15.4)	−17.3 (0.9)	−29.8 (−21.6)	−31.2 (−24.2)
Average precipitation mm (inches)	31.2 (1.23)	28.8 (1.13)	35.4 (1.39)	47.4 (1.87)	81.0 (3.19)	70.7 (2.78)	96.3 (3.79)	70.5 (2.78)	67.2 (2.65)	50.2 (1.98)	36.4 (1.43)	30.5 (1.20)	645.6 (25.42)
Average precipitation days (≥ 0.1 mm)	16.9	14.2	14.3	12.3	14.8	13.7	14.6	11.3	11.5	12.1	13.6	15.3	164.4
Average relative humidity (%)	85.1	84.5	80.2	73.3	73.4	72.8	73.8	75.9	81.3	83.9	86.2	86.4	79.7
Source: Meteomodel.pl
