= Władysław Tarnowski =

Polish pianist, composer and poet (1836–1878)

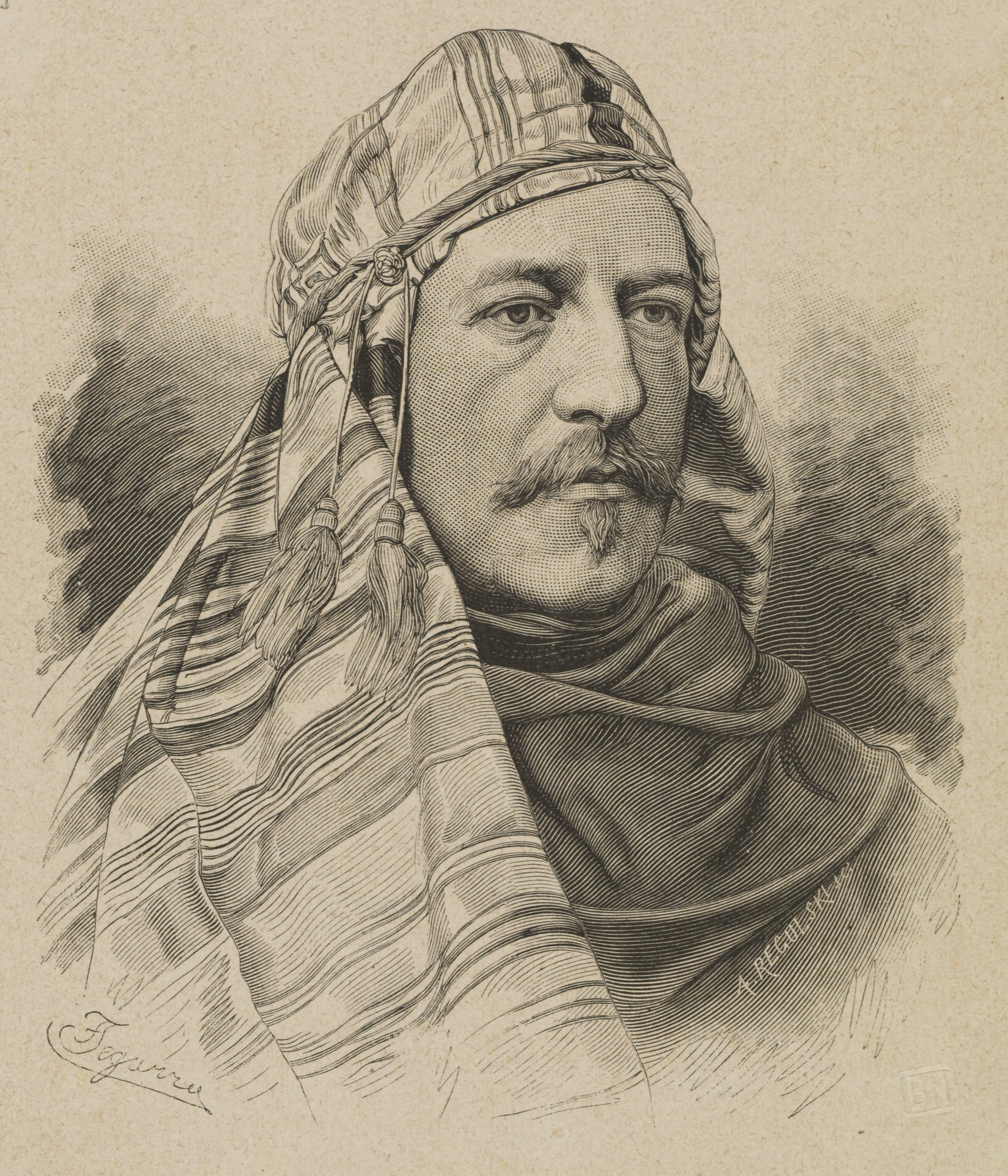
Tarnowski in an Arab headdress, carved in wood by Aleksander Tadeusz Regulski in 1878 and based on a portrait by Franciszek Tegazzo

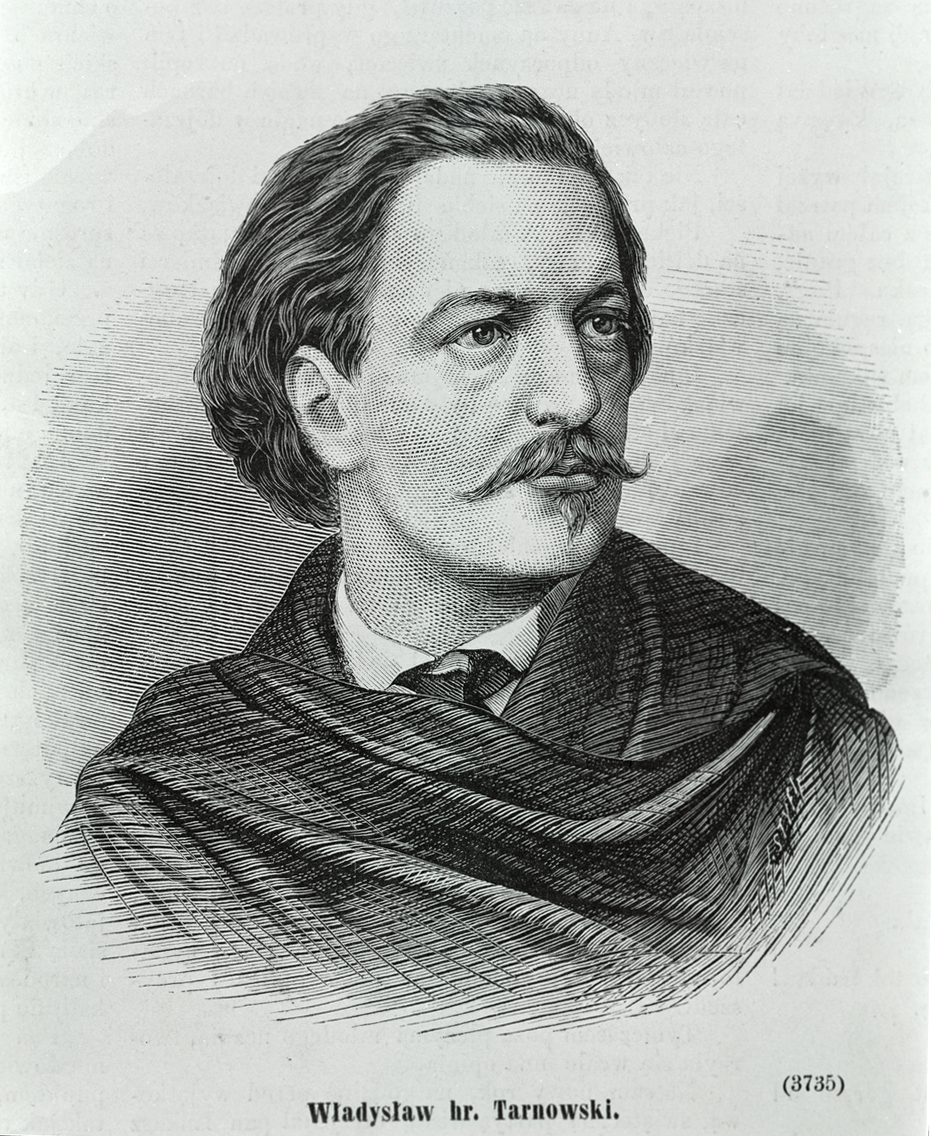
Tarnowski in an 1877 wood engraving by Jan Styfi

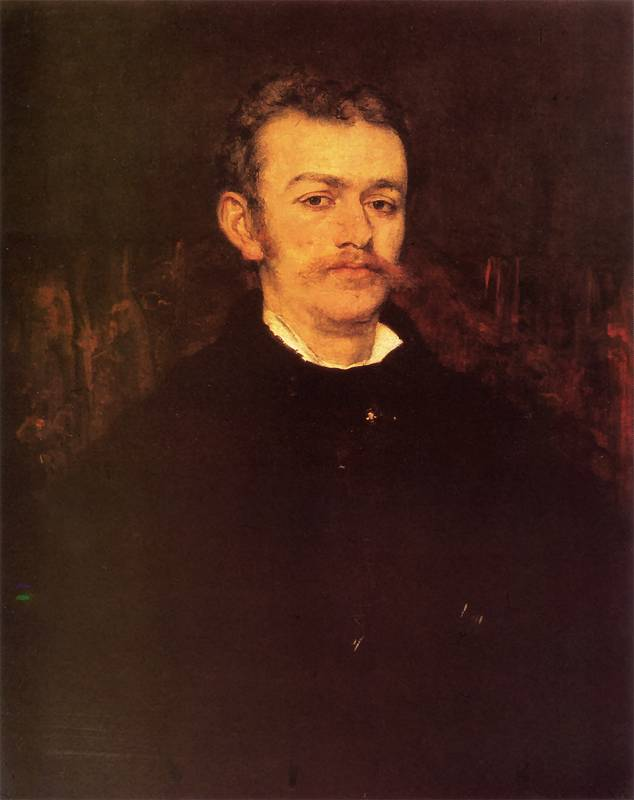
Tarnowski by Maurycy Gottlieb, 1877

Władysław Tarnowski (June 4, 1836 – April 19, 1878), also known by his pen name Ernest Buława, was a Polish pianist, composer, poet, dramatist, and translator. Tarnowski was born in Wróblewice, an administrative district of Drohobycz in present-day Ukraine, to Count Walerian Spycimir Tarnowski and Ernestyna Tarnowska. As a young prodigy, he was introduced to Frédéric Chopin. Tarnowski studied in Lviv and Kraków, and with Daniel Auber at the Conservatoire de Paris. During the January Uprising of 1863-64 he wrote the song "Jak to na wojence ładnie" ("Isn't the War Fun"), which remains popular in several iterations. Tarnowski traveled widely, giving concerts in Wrocław in 1860 and 1875, Vienna, Venice and Florence in 1872, Paris in 1873, and Lviv in 1875. He toured the Middle East and Asia, lived in India, China, and Japan, and died near San Francisco on the steamer SS Pacific while returning from Japan.

== Compositions ==
=== Ensemble ===
- String Quartet in D major
- Fantasia quasi una sonata (violins and piano)
- Souvenir d'un ange (Vienna c. 1876, published by V. Kratochwill)

=== Piano ===
- 3 Mazurkas (3 Mazurkas, Vienna c. 1870, published by Bösendorfer),
- 2 pieces: Chart sans paroles, Valse-poeme (Leipzig c. 1870, published by Ch. F. Kahut)
- Deux Morceaux: Fantazie-Impromptu, Valse-poeme
- Impromptu "L'adieu de l'artiste" (Vienna c. 1870, published by J. Gutmann)
- Symfonia d’un drammo d’amore (1871)
- Sonate pour piano composée et dediée a son ami Br. Zawadzki (Vienna c. 1875, publ. V. Kratochwill)
- Grande polonaise quasi rhapsodies symphonique (Vienna c. 1875, publ. J. Gutmann)
- Extases au Bosphor, fantasie rhapsodies sur les melodies orientales op. 10 (Leipzig c. 1875, publ. Forberg)
- Nocturne dédié à sa soeur Marie (Vienna, n.d.)
- Deux Nocturnes: "Nuit sombre", "Nuit claire"
- Ave Maria, dedicated to Józef Ignacy Kraszewski in Album Muzeum Narodowego w Rapperswyllu (1876), with variations for choir and organ and string quartet
  Ave Maria
- Pensée funebre (before 1878)
- Andantino pensieroso ("Echo Muzyczne", Warszaw, issue 6, 17 December 1878.)

Andantino pensieroso

=== Songs ===
Solo:

- "Uhlans March" (also known as "Soldier's Song" and "March Soldier's Langiewicza"), beginning: "A kto chce rozkoszy użyć" ("And who wants pleasure to use"). Now better-known with the lyrics "Jak to na wojence ładnie". Published in Kieszonkowy słowniczek polski z melodiami (Poznan, 1889, J. Leitgebera) and as " War Song" (Lwow, 1908, B. Połoniecki).

With piano accompaniment:

- "Cypryssen 5 characterische Gesänge" (Vienna, 1870, Bösendorfera), with "Herangedämmert kam der Abend", "Die Perle", "Die Schwalben", "Im Traum sah ich das Lieben", and "Ich sank verweint in sanften Schlummer"

"Ich sank verweint in sanften schlummer" (piano version)

- "Neig, o Schöne Knospe", for a poem by Mirza Shafi Vazeh

"Neig o schone Knospe" (piano version)

- "Zwei Gesänge mit Begleitung des Pianoforte – Du buch mit Siegen Siegeln, Ob Du Nun ruhst", songs for a poem by Ludwig Foglar (Vienna c. 1870, V. Kratochwill)

"Du buch mit sieben siegeln" (piano version)

"Ob du nun ruhst" (piano version)

- "Zwei Gesänge: Klänge Und Schmerzen, Nächtliche Regung" (Leipzig, c. 1870, Ch. E. Kahnt)
- "Au soleil couchant" (1873), for a poem by Victor Hugo
- "Still klingt das Glöcklein durch Felder" (Vienna c. 1875, J. Gutmann)

"Still klingt das Glocklein durch Felder" (accompaniment)

- "Kennst du die Rosen", for his own poem (J. Gutmann, Vienna)

"Kennst du die Rosen" (accompaniment

- "Mein Kahn", for a poem by Johann von Paümann (Hans Max; Wiedeń, Buchholz and Diedel)
- "Alpuhara" (1877), for a poem by Adam Mickiewicz

=== Stage ===
- Achmed the oder the Pilger the Liebe (Achmed, pielgrzym milości), with libretto, based on Washington Irving's "Legend of Prince Ahmed al Kamel, or The Pilgrim of Love" from Tales of the Alhambra. Piano extract (Leipzig, c. 1875, R. Forberg)
- Karlinscy (Vienna, 1874, V. Kratochwill)
- Joanna Grey (Vienna, 1875, V. Kratochwill)

"Alastor's romance", from Joanna Grey (piano instead of string trio)

Tarnowski wrote articles and reviews for Ruch literacki and Tygodnik ilustrowany.

== Literary works ==
=== Poetry ===
- "Krople czary" ("Drops From a Goblet"), 1865
- "Szkice helweckie i Talia" (1868, Leipzig, P. Rhode)
- "Piołuny" ("Absinthe"), 1869
- "Kochankowie ojczyzny" ("Lovers of the Motherland"), 1872

=== Dramas ===
- Karlińscy, 1874
- Joanna Grey (Jane Grey), 1875
- The Achmed the oder the Pilger the Liebe (libretto in German)

=== Translations ===
- The Osjan Song
- Hamlet
- Works by P. B. Shelley and H. Heine
- P. Cornelius, Grundzüge der Geschichte der Musik (Zarys historii muzyki, Outline of the History of Music, Leipzig, 1869)
