= Melsztyn =

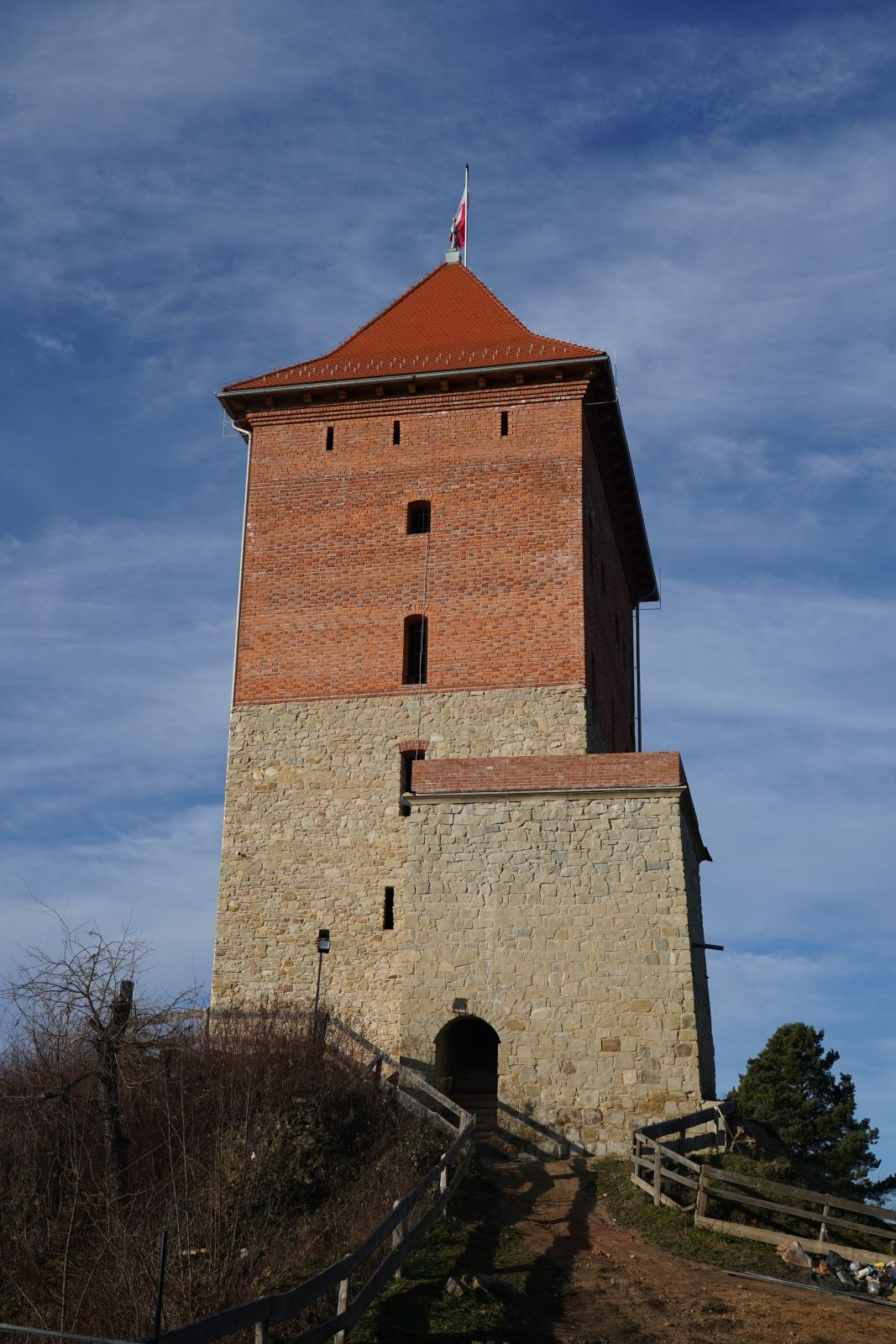
- Melsztyn castle

- Location within Poland
- Coordinates: 49°52′N 20°46′E
- Country: Poland
- Voivodeship: Lesser Poland
- County: Tarnów
- Gmina: Zakliczyn
- Time zone: UTC+1 (CET)
  - Summer (DST): UTC+2 (CEST)
- Postal code: 32-840
- Area code: +48 14
- Car plates: KTA

Melsztyn [ˈmɛlʂtɨn] is a village on the left bank of the Dunajec river in the Lesser Poland Voivodeship, Poland. The village was first mentioned in the year 1347.

The name of the village is a Polonized version of a German word Mehlstein. In the Middle Ages, Melsztyn belonged to a famous nobleman Spytek of Melsztyn, who built a castle on a hill. The castle stood for hundreds of years, and was burned in 1771, during the Bar Confederation, as Polish rebels fought the Russians here. Among the owners of Melsztyn were the noble families of Tarnowski, Jordan, Zborowski, Tarło and Lubomirski. The Melsztyn Castle was a ruin for many years but was rebuilt in 2023. It offers an excellent view of the surrounding area.

== See also ==
- Castles in Poland
