= Wielowieś, Tarnobrzeg =

Coordinates: 50.6339°N 21.7528°E

Wielowieś
- Tarnobrzeg District
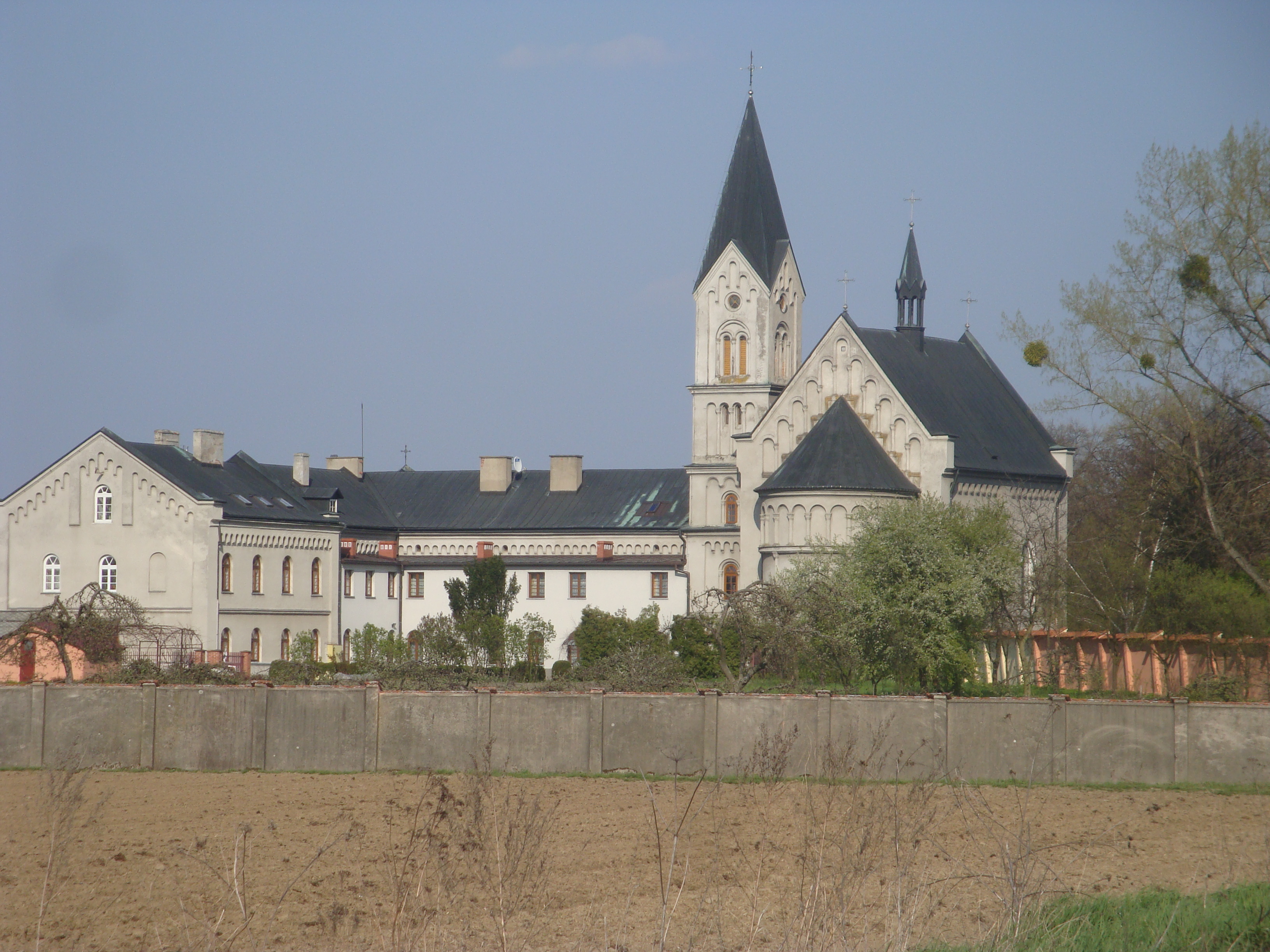
- Monastery of Dominicans Sisters in Tarnobrzeg

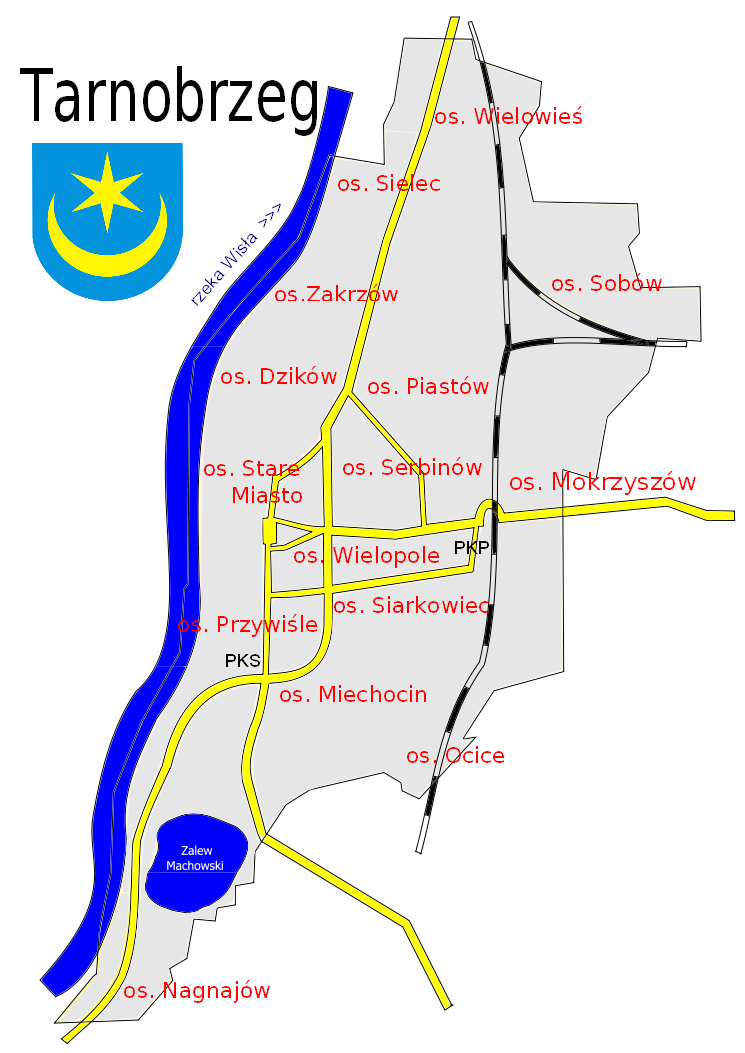
- Country: Poland
- Voivodeship: Podkarpackie
- County/City: Tarnobrzeg
- Notable landmarks: Monastery of Dominicans Sisters

Population
  - Total: around 1,500
- Time zone: UTC+1 (CET)
  - Summer (DST): UTC+2 (CEST)
- Postal code: 39-400
- Area code: +48 15

Wielowieś is a former village in Podkarpackie Voivodeship, Poland, now part of the city of Tarnobrzeg.

== History ==
The settlement of Wielowies already existed in the early days of the Kingdom of Poland, and was a small Vistula river port. A wooden church was built here, which was destroyed together with the village in a Lithuanian raid in 1376. Wielowies was rebuilt, and a manor house was constructed in the middle of the village. The house belonged to the Leliwita noble family, owners of several villages in this part of Lesser Poland (in the 16th century, the Leliwitas took on the surname Tarnowski). Among others, it hosted King Wladyslaw Jagiello with family. The house was destroyed during the Swedish invasion of Poland (1655 - 1660). In the late 15th century, the Tarnowski family funded their funeral chapel with a late Renaissance wooden altar from the 1580s. First person buried here was the founder of Tarnobrzeg, Stanislaw Tarnowski, who died in 1608. In 1860, first Dominican Sisters came here, and subsequently, a monastery was built. The sisters opened one of the first schools for village girls in the region.
