= Polish Inquisition =

Ecclesiastical institution to combat heretics

The Polish Inquisition was an ecclesiastical institution established in the 13th century to combat those deemed as heretics. Permanent structures of the inquisition in Polish territories were established in the first half of the 14th century and always played a subordinate role to episcopal tribunals, which were already combating heretics in Poland in the mid-13th century. The final end of the existence of inquisitorial tribunals came with the Reformation and the victory of the idea of religious tolerance in Poland in the second half of the 16th century.

Geographically, the jurisdiction of Polish inquisitors included territories within the Gniezno metropolitan province (including Silesia, and from the late 14th century also Lithuania) and Prussia, but did not include (except for a brief period in the 1460s) Western Pomerania, which, according to the bull of Boniface IX from 1399, was under the jurisdiction of inquisitors from the German province of Saxony. Meanwhile, Red Ruthenia, although it belonged to the Polish state from 1340 (with a brief interruption during the reign of Louis I of Hungary), until the mid-15th century formed a separate unit within the territorial structures of the papal inquisition.

== History of the inquisition in Polish lands ==
=== Anti-heretical repressions in Poland until 1318 ===
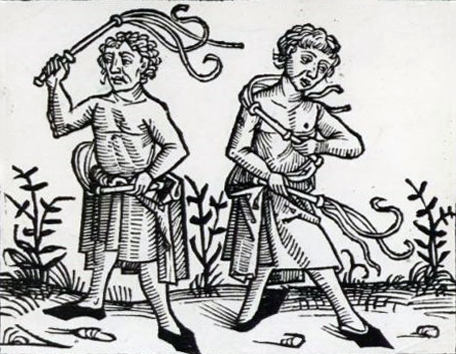
A 15th-century woodcut depicting flagellants

In Poland in the 12th and 13th centuries, there were no recorded instances of the mass heretical movements present in the West and South of the continent (such as the Cathars or Waldensians). Only in 1261 did the flagellants, a non-orthodox penitential movement, reach Polish lands. As can be inferred from chronicle references, the Church pacified this movement without triggering a larger-scale repression apparatus. Archbishop of Gniezno, Janusz Tarnowa, forbade the flagellants' processions under penalty of excommunication and imprisonment, and these regulations were approved by secular authorities. Most likely, the vast majority of flagellants complied with these prohibitions.

It was only at the beginning of the 14th century that the Waldensian movement began to penetrate Silesia (probably from Bohemia). A Waldensian community was discovered in 1315 in Świdnica. Bishop of Wrocław, Henryk of Wierzbna, ordered a large-scale repressive action. He appointed his auxiliary bishop Paweł as the chairman of the tribunal. As a result of the action, a large number of individuals suspected of belonging to this group were captured in Wrocław, Świdnica, and Nysa. Around 50 people were burned at the stake, and many others had to flee. At the same time, repression against the Waldensians also took place in Austria and Bohemia.

The persecution of the Waldensians in Silesia in 1315 was the work of the bishop's tribunal, not the papal inquisition, which did not exist in Polish lands at that time. However, these events may have influenced Pope John XXII's decision to appoint papal inquisitors for Polish dioceses.

=== 14th century (since 1318) ===
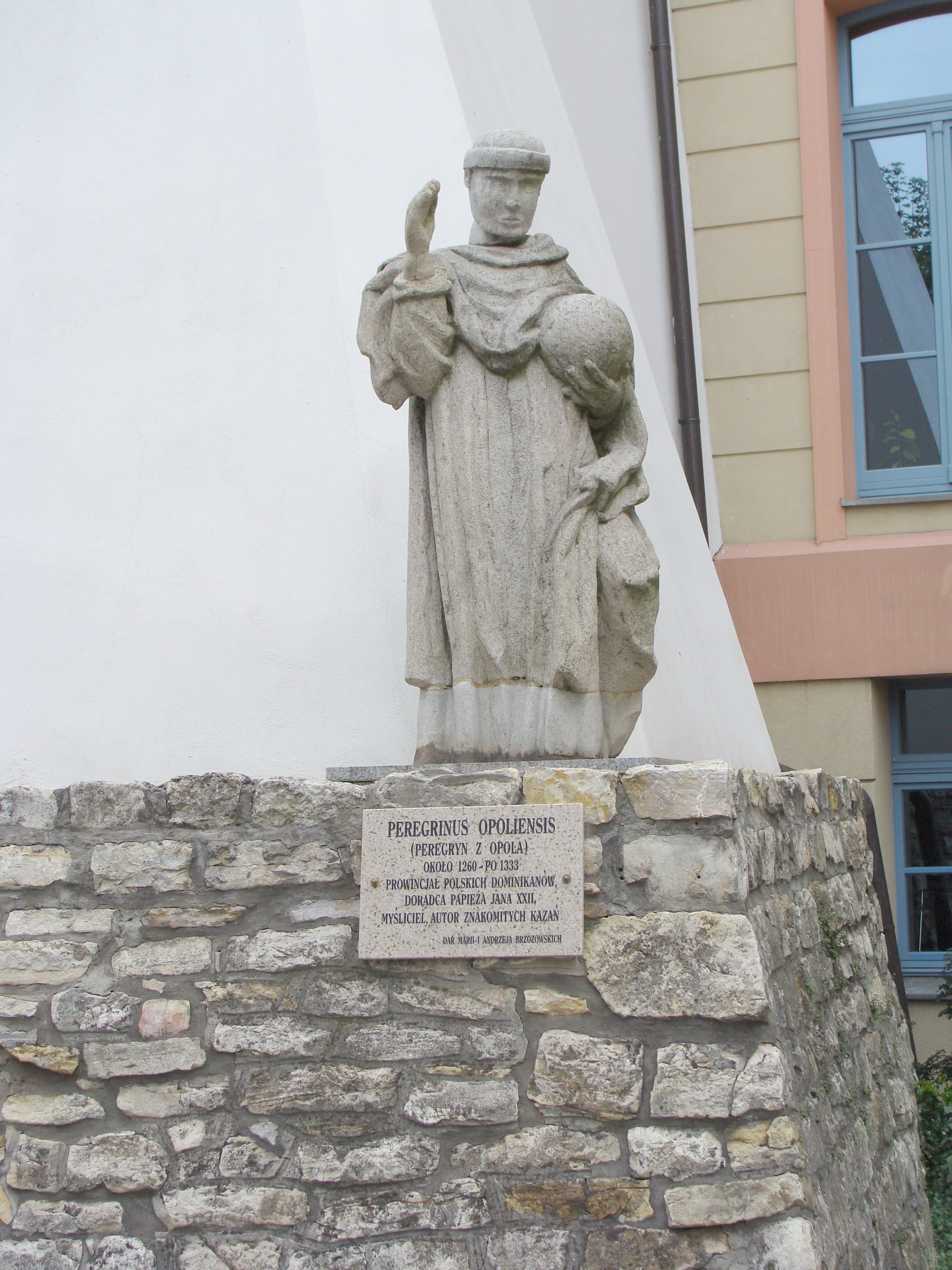
Peregrine of Opole, the first papal inquisitor in the Polish lands

On 1 May 1318, Pope John XXII appointed the Dominican Peregrine of Opole and the Franciscan Mikołaj Hospodyniec as inquisitors for the dioceses of Wrocław and Kraków. Nine years later, in April 1327, John XXII issued further regulations, granting the Polish provincial superior of the Dominicans the authority to appoint inquisitors throughout the entire Polish province, and called on the Polish king and episcopate to support the inquisitors. This regulation, confirmed by Pope Eugene IV in 1432, became the basis for the functioning of the papal inquisition office in Poland. Both inquisitors appointed in 1318 either resigned or were dismissed from office, and from then until the time of the Reformation, this office was held exclusively by Dominicans.

The papal regulations from 1318 to 1327 probably had a preventive character and were not associated with an increase in heretical activity in Polish lands. The persecution of the Waldensians in Silesia by the episcopal courts in 1315 was most likely effective and did not require support from the papal inquisition. This is also evidenced by the fact that the Dominican provincial did not rush to appoint new inquisitors in place of Peregrine of Opole and Mikołaj Hospodyniec. The new inquisitor for Kraków was appointed no earlier than 1328, and for Wrocław in 1330. In the 1330s, inquisitors were also appointed for Greater Poland, which was not under the jurisdiction of the inquisitors appointed in 1318, as well as for the Teutonic Order state, as Prussia belonged to the Polish Dominican province.

Despite the papal inquisition's jurisdiction over all Polish lands, almost all specific information about its activities in the 14th century comes from Silesia, which politically was not part of Poland from 1327 onwards but a fief of the Czechs. In 1332, the Wrocław-Lubusz inquisitor Jan Schwenkenfeld conducted a trial against 16 Beguines from Świdnica, suspected of adhering to the so-called "Brethren of the Free Spirit". A few years later, this inquisitor became involved in a conflict between Bishop of Wrocław Nanker and the Wrocław city council on the side of the former, which ended in his murder in 1341. In 1349, another wave of flagellants passed through Polish lands, condemned by Pope Clement VI. Their leader in the Wrocław diocese was burned at the stake on the orders of Bishop Przecław of Pogorzela. Around 1380, houses of Beguines and Beghards were confiscated in Silesia, and in 1398, a supporter of John Wycliffe's teachings was burned in Wrocław.

There is almost no information about inquisition trials in the Kingdom of Poland in the 14th century. Although the 16th-century historian Matthias Flacius claimed that around 1330, Poland, together with Bohemia, was the scene of a major inquisition action against the Waldensians, a more detailed analysis of Flacius's text and his sources has questioned this view. The German inquisitor Peter Zwicker noted around 1395 that one of the countries untouched by Waldensian teachings was the Kingdom of Kraków.

=== 15th century ===
The activities of Wycliffe and Jan Hus caused unrest in academic circles in Europe, including Kraków. Kraków's inquisitor, Piotr, attempted to counter the spread of "suspect" ideas and, in 1408, obtained an edict from King Władysław II Jagiełło obligating secular authorities to cooperate with the inquisition. In 1413, Jerome of Prague, a close associate of Jan Hus, nearly fell into the hands of Inquisitor Piotr while in Poland but was warned in time and fled to Lithuania.

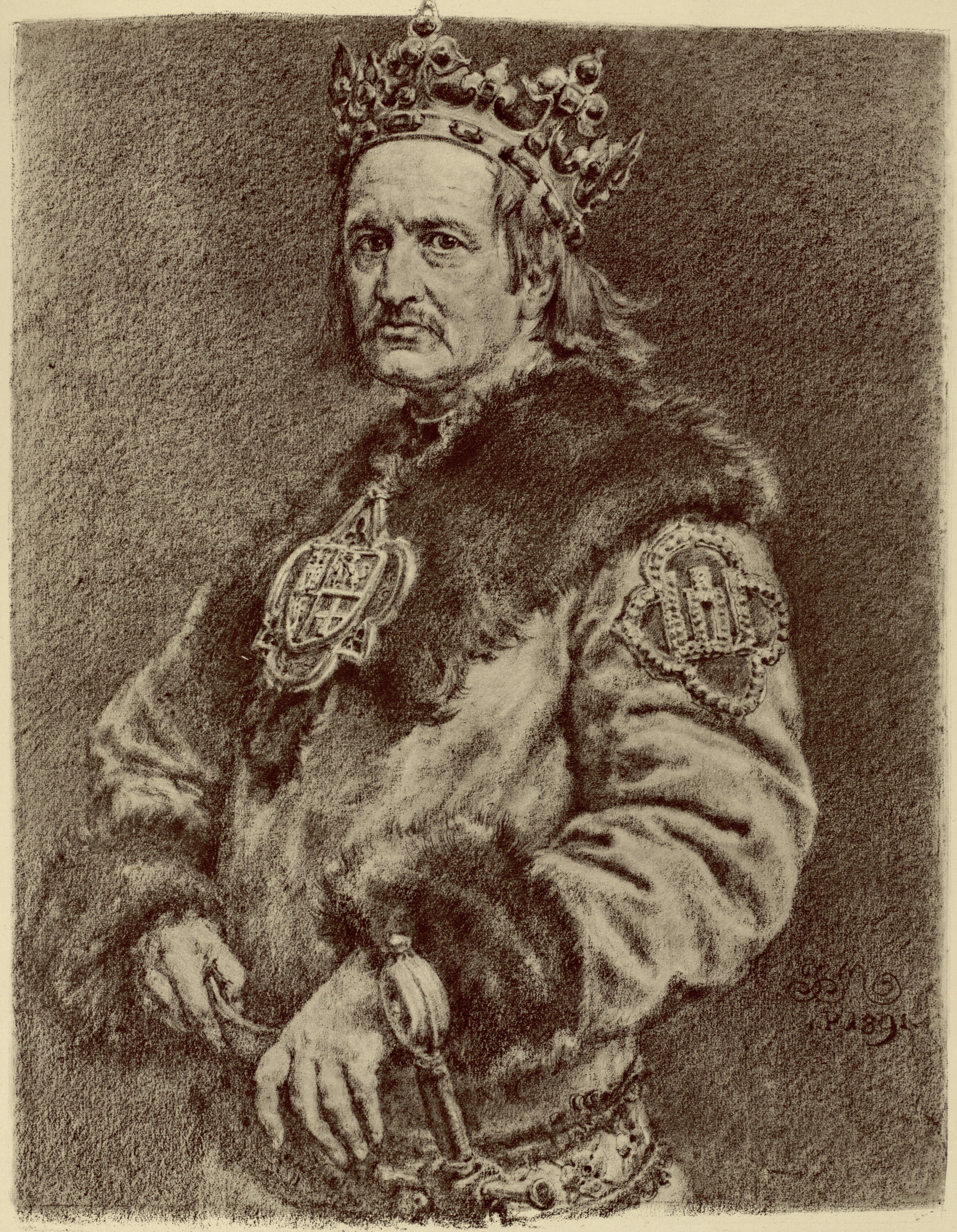
King Władysław Jagiełło considered heresy a crime of insult to majesty

After the Council of Constance, where Jan Hus was burned at the stake in 1415 and Jerome of Prague in 1416, the Polish episcopate took steps against the spread of their ideas in Poland and sought royal support in this regard. Resolutions of the provincial synod in 1420 condemned Hussites and mandated faithful to denounce all suspects to the inquisitors, and in subsequent years, reminders of these resolutions were regularly given in sermons and resolutions of subsequent synods. On 9 April 1424, King Władysław Jagiełło issued the so-called Edict of Wieluń, declaring the confession of Hussites a crime against majesty. In 1436, 1454, and 1463, papal inquisitors received royal privileges requiring all subjects to assist them in combating heresy.

Inquisitors Mikołaj of Łęczyca and Jakub Grzymała participated in trials of suspected Hussites in the Poznań and Płock dioceses, for example, from 1439 to 1443, Mikołaj of Łęczyca interrogated Hussites from Zbąszyń, the main center of this faith in Greater Poland. The protector of Hussites in this region was nobleman Abraham Głowacz of Zbąszyń (died in 1441), who eventually reconciled with the church shortly before his death. Generally, however, anti-heretical activity in the Kingdom of Poland was predominantly carried out by episcopal courts, while the role of papal inquisitors was at best auxiliary. Of the nearly 200 cases of heresy recorded in sources in 15th-century Poland, almost all were adjudicated by episcopal courts, although sometimes the inquisitor also participated in the questioning of witnesses and suspects. Only in five cases was a verdict issued jointly by the inquisitor and the bishop, acting together as co-judges. Only a dozen or so verdicts were issued by inquisitors without the participation of the bishop. Even the trials of Hussites from Zbąszyń in the 1440s, in which Inquisitor Mikołaj of Łęczyca played an active role, were initiated by the Bishop of Poznań, Andrzej Bniński, who personally interrogated many suspects and issued or approved verdicts.

Next to Andrzej Bniński, Bishop of Kraków Zbigniew Oleśnicki (died in 1455) is considered the main "persecutor" of Polish Hussites. He served as regent of the Kingdom of Poland after the death of Władysław Jagiełło in 1434, pursuing a radically anti-Czech and anti-Hussite policy. Part of the nobility led by Spytko III of Melsztyn opposed his rule and sympathized with Hussites. However, when in 1439 they formed a confederation and revolted against Oleśnicki, they were defeated in the Battle of Grotniki. Less is known about Oleśnicki's inquisitorial activity against Hussites because the records of the Kraków episcopal court before 1466 have not survived.

The subordinate role of inquisitors in combating heresy, as deduced from surviving procedural records, is indirectly confirmed by the fact that for many serving in the 15th and early 16th centuries, being an inquisitor was only an additional function. They were dedicated to studies or held various administrative positions in the order, serving as priors of monasteries, and sometimes even as provincial superiors. When in 1465 the Polish provincial chapter, under pressure from the order's authorities, passed a ban on combining the offices of prior and inquisitor, it turned out that this issue affected four inquisitors then in office: Jakub Grzymała, prior of Płock, Grzegorz Hejncze, prior of Wrocław, Wincenty Wierzbięta, prior of Poznań, and Mikołaj Grüneberg, prior of Toruń. Apparently, these resolutions were not consistently enforced. In 1478, Wojciech of Siecień obtained a dispensation from the order's general, Leonardo Mansueti, allowing him to combine the offices of Kraków inquisitor and provincial.

The last significant trials against Hussites in Poland took place in Kuyavia. In 1480, Bishop of Kuyavia Zbigniew Oleśnicki (died in 1493) interrogated several people, of whom he found six guilty of heresy. In 1499, Bishop Krzesław Kurozwęcki sentenced clergyman Adam of Radziejów to death for refusing to renounce heresy.

The lack of church documentation seriously hinders the assessment of the activity of the inquisition (both papal and episcopal) in the 15th century in Silesia, which belonged to Bohemia at that time. In 1420, a Prague burgher named Jan Krasa was executed in Wrocław for confessing Hussites, but the sentence was issued by the papal legate Fernando de Palacios and the Czech-German king Sigismund of Luxembourg, who were present in the city at that time. In the 1420s and 1430s, Silesia became a battleground between Catholics and Hussites. Many cases are recorded in the sources where individuals suspected of pro-Hussite sympathies were punished by secular authorities as traitors. However, it is difficult to determine the extent of the inquisition's involvement in these events. One of the few sources mentions that may refer to the activity of the Silesian inquisition in the 15th century is the information from Zygmunt Rosicz's chronicle about the burning of Peter of Leśnica, an advocate of the local diocesan consistory, in Wrocław in 1437. Another significant legacy is the theological and preaching work of Jan of Ząbkowice, the inquisitor of Wrocław from 1429 to 1441, who died in 1446.

The dissolution of the Dominican missionary congregation Societas Fratrum Peregrinantium in 1456 resulted in the transfer of the inquisitorial tribunal in Ruthenia under the authority of the Polish provincial of the Dominicans.

=== 16th century ===
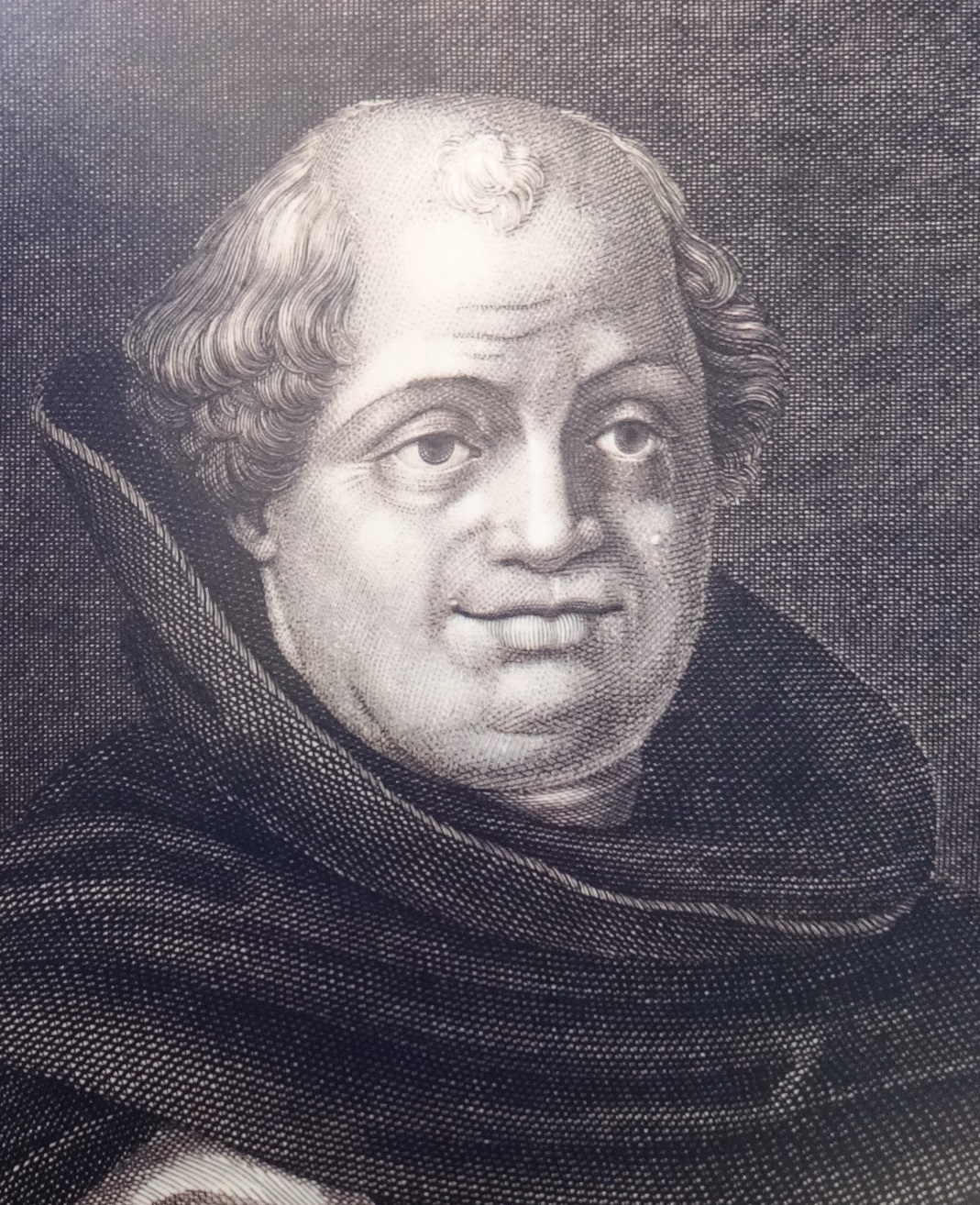
Johann Tetzel, before becoming a seller of indulgences, was an inquisitor of the Polish Dominican province

The final period of the existence of inquisitorial tribunals in the Polish lands is the least researched. A critical catalog of papal inquisitors from the 16th century has not been compiled to date. However, it is undisputed that at the beginning of this century, the monastic authorities continued to regularly appoint inquisitors, and they performed their functions. For example, in 1508, the Kraków inquisitor Mikołaj from Żnin sentenced a Jew accused of blasphemy to the stake, and a year later, Johann Tetzel from the Głogów convent was appointed as the inquisitor of the Polish province. Furthermore, the area of activity of Polish inquisitors expanded to the Grand Duchy of Lithuania, where in 1507, the prior of Vilnius, Piotr from Sochaczew, acted as an inquisitor. Nevertheless, when after 1517 the ideas of Martin Luther began to spread in many regions of the country, the main burden of combating them was taken up by the bishops. The resolutions of provincial synods from the years 1527, 1532, 1542, and 1551 called for decisive steps against heresy, but entrusted its eradication solely to episcopal inquisition. In 1539, in Kraków, the episcopal court sentenced Katarzyna Weiglowa to be burned at the stake for denying the dogma of the Holy Trinity and adopting Judaism.

The resolutions of the bishops' synod in 1542 established that only inquisitors appointed by the bishops could operate within the metropolitan provinces of Gniezno and Lviv. In at least some dioceses, bishops established their own subordinate inquisitorial tribunals. For example, in 1541, the Carmelite Jan of Kazimierz became the inquisitor in Kraków, in 1546, the Dominican Paweł Sarbin in Poznań, and in 1557, the local canon Jan Bielecki in Przemyśl. Paweł Sarbin (d. 1563), the Poznań diocesan inquisitor, showed great determination in summoning Protestants before the court, but he did not achieve significant success in this field due to the resistance of the nobility and townspeople.

The activity of the episcopal inquisition in the long run was unable to stop the spread of Reformation ideas due to the lack of support from secular authorities and the determined resistance of a significant part of the higher social strata. Although King Sigismund I the Old (d. 1548) and initially his son Sigismund II Augustus (d. 1572) issued edicts against Lutheranism, they were not respected. The nobility and municipal authorities refused to cooperate with ecclesiastical courts in combating heresy. Moreover, many clergy, including bishops, sympathized with Protestantism. For example, Bishop Jan Drohojewski of Kuyavia handed over a church to Lutherans in Gdańsk and was regarded as a crypto-Protestant. In 1552, Pope Julius III even instructed the Kraków inquisitor Jan from Kazimierz to initiate proceedings regarding the religious views of the primate at the time, Mikołaj Dzierzgowski, and the Bishop of Chełmno, Jakub Uchański. The final end of the activity of inquisitorial tribunals in Poland came with the resolutions of Sejm from the years 1552–1573. In 1552, Sejm exempted the nobility from the jurisdiction of ecclesiastical courts, and from 1562 to 1565, it passed a ban on the execution of sentences by secular authorities. Finally, the Warsaw Confederation of 1573 established religious tolerance for Protestant denominations.

In the Dominican historiographical tradition, several monks are mentioned who were supposed to serve as inquisitors even during the reign of King Sigismund Augustus, despite synodal and parliamentary resolutions. The last of them, Melchior of Mościska, died only in 1590. If this information is accurate (which is uncertain), there is nothing to indicate that the titles of inquisitors were anything more than honorary distinctions for these monks, as actual heresy trials were conducted before diocesan courts. Contemporary historian Paweł Kras accepts the year 1552 as the date of the abolition of the Dominican inquisition in Poland.

== Statistics of trials and executions ==
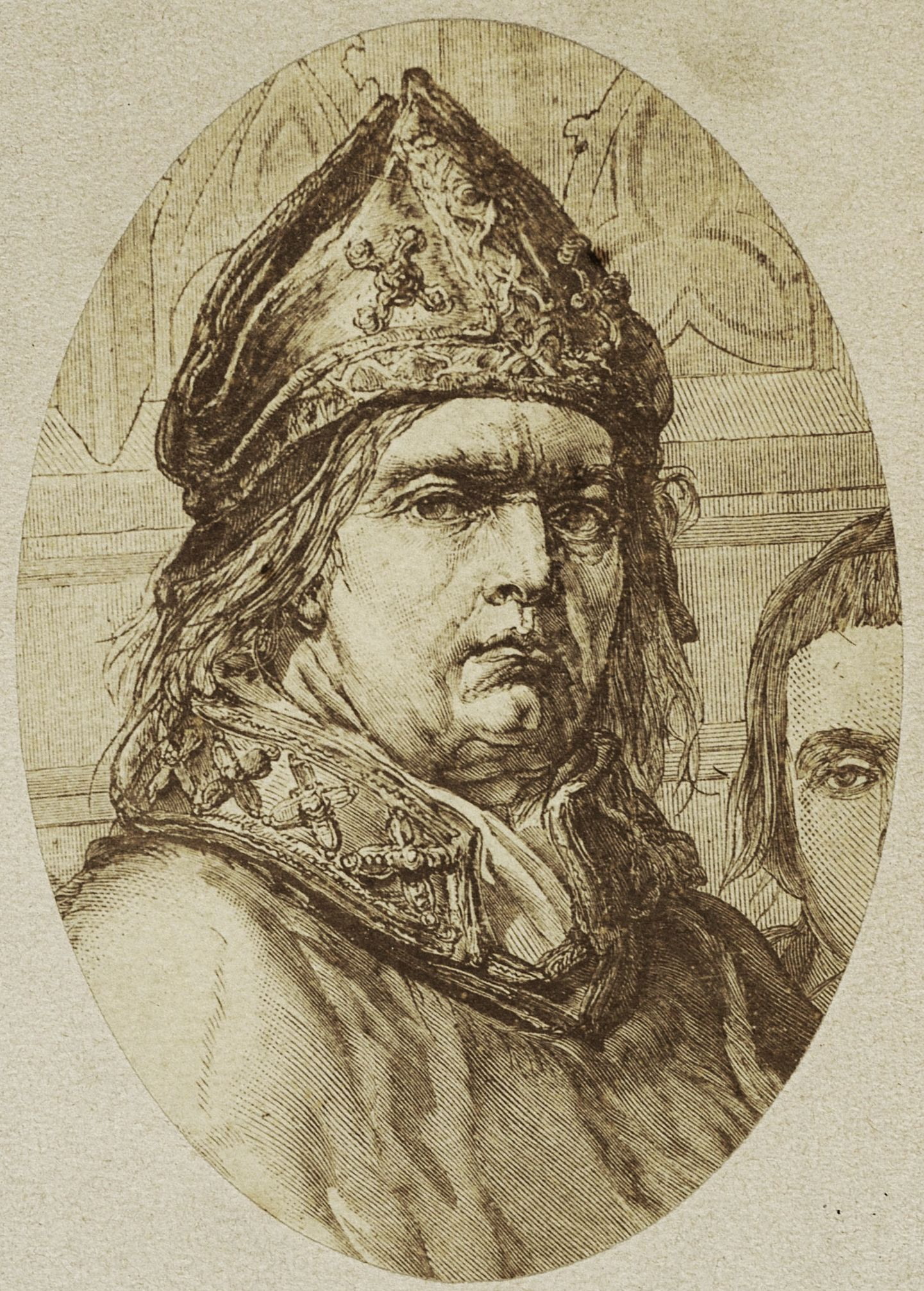
Zbigniew Oleśnicki, bishop of Kraków and cardinal, was regarded as the main conqueror of the Polish Hussites

Seventeenth-century Dominican historiographers outlined a very broad scope of activity of papal inquisitors in Poland. Many pieces of information about alleged trials and executions of heretics in Polish lands from the beginning of the 14th to the mid-16th century were provided by Vincenzo Maria Fontana, followed by the 19th-century Dominican historian Sadok Barącz. The apologetic nature of Fontana's work, whose main goal was to glorify the achievements of his own order in the fight against heresy, his very liberal treatment of sources (e.g., frequent "enrichment" of earlier authors' accounts), rich rhetorical style, and a high level of generality in most accounts, and above all, confrontation with contemporary sources, make most historians consider the descriptions of Polish inquisitors' actions contained in his work as unreliable. Henry Charles Lea (1825–1909) dedicated very little space to the activity of the inquisition in Poland in his monumental history of the medieval inquisition, mentioning it only incidentally when discussing the activity of the inquisition in Bohemia. Almost all preserved documentation regarding anti-heretical repressions in Polish lands pertains to episcopal courts. Mentions of the activity of papal inquisitors are sporadic and very often only indicate the participation of the inquisitor in a trial conducted by an episcopal court.

=== Trials of the Papal Inquisition ===
Relatively the most information about the Papal Inquisition comes from Silesia, although even here it is quite limited and almost exclusively from the 14th century. Inquisitor Jan Szwenkenfeld conducted an investigation against the Beguines of Świdnica in 1332. Sixteen suspected members of the community were interrogated, who confessed to heresy. Unfortunately, it is not known what sentences were passed; contemporary sources do not record any executions, but it is likely that the Beguine convent in Świdnica was dissolved. Eight years later, the same inquisitor arrested a priest named Marcin of Wrocław on charges of heresy. Again, it is not known how the trial ended. In 1398, inquisitor Jan of Gliwice burned a certain Stefan, a follower of Wycliffeanism.

From the territory of the Kingdom of Poland, most of the preserved information concerns the activity of two inquisitors appointed for the northern dioceses of the Kingdom of Poland: Mikołaj z Łęczycy (1427–1450) and Jakub Grzymała (documented in office from 1454 to 1466). Mikołaj of Łęczyca worked in the Gniezno archdiocese in 1438 and then from 1439 to 1443 in the Poznań diocese in collaboration with Bishop Andrzej Bniński. His participation in the trials of ten suspects from the Zbąszyń area is noted, including two who had previously been absolved by him, Miklasz of Gniezno and Jakub of Wroniawy, who relapsed into heresy and were sentenced to imprisonment. Out of these ten cases, Mikołaj absolved the suspects and imposed penance on them in five cases, jointly with the bishop in four cases, and in one case, he only participated in the interrogations and was present during the ceremony of renouncing heresy by the accused, but he did not formally participate in issuing the verdict. Jakub Grzymała conducted a trial in the Płock diocese in September 1457 against the vicar Mikołaj of Bulkowo and an unnamed woman; the vicar was imprisoned, while the woman was imposed penance. In 1466, he sued the priest Marcin of Strzegowo on charges of heresy, but Marcin ignored the summons, and the further course of the case is unknown. Perhaps a little earlier, around 1453, Jakub Grzymała conducted trials against Hussites in Kraków, where even death sentences could have been handed down. Fontana claimed this, and although contemporary sources do not confirm this information, there are indications that Fontana's account may be trustworthy. According to Abraham Bzowski, even in the early 17th century, there was a volume of trial records of this inquisitor in the Kraków convent. However, such documentation has not been found to date, and Bzowski himself did not discuss the content of these records.

Krakow inquisitor Piotr Kantor conducted at least two proceedings on heresy. In 1410, he investigated the case of the cleric Mikołaj, accused of practicing in magic and astrology, as well as impersonating a clergyman. The case most likely ended with referral to the papal curia for judgment. Shortly afterward, Piotr Kantor initiated proceedings against Canon Jan of Lganów of the Jelita coat of arms, who, however, evaded appearing. Presumably, the inquisitor issued an ex parte judgment against him, sentencing him to deprivation of church benefits.

Another Kraków inquisitor, Jan Polak, conducted two trials against the Czech Henryk of Brzeg, the royal court astrologer, in the 1420s, accused of heretical magic. The first time (before 1428), the inquisitor granted him absolution and admonition. However, in 1428, he was again brought to trial, this time jointly conducted by Inquisitor Jan and Bishop Zbigniew Oleśnicki of Kraków. The astrologer was sentenced to "eternal imprisonment".

Prussian Inquisitor Piotr Wichman in 1430 accused the Teutonic Order's parish priest from Toruń, Andrzej Pfaffendorf, of favoring Hussites. This case quickly turned into a political dispute between supporters of the Teutonic Order's authority and its opponents, ultimately leading to the temporary expulsion of Dominicans from Toruń. The process lasted several years and involved the Apostolic See. Eventually, Pfaffendorf had to renounce his beliefs.

In April 1508, Kraków Inquisitor Mikołaj of Żnin sentenced a Jew accused of blasphemy and desecration of the Host to be burned.

The above, rather modest and probably far from complete tally of documented actions of the Papal Inquisition (about 40 proceedings, two confirmed executions) constitutes only a fraction of the actual anti-heretical activities in the Polish lands. These were mainly conducted by episcopal courts.

=== Trials of the Episcopal Inquisition ===
The investigation against the Silesian Waldensians conducted by inquisitors appointed by Bishop Henry of Wrocław in 1315 was the first and most bloody proceeding of this kind in the Polish lands. Although fragmentary preserved documentation confirms only five executions (four in Świdnica and one in Nysa), chronicle records indicate that the actual number of burned individuals amounted to around 50.

In 1319, Bishop Gerward Leszczyc of Kuyavia accused the Beghards from the convent in Kaszczorek near Toruń of heresy. Two Beghards were burned, and the entire convent was dissolved two years later. In 1349, Bishop Przecław of Wrocław sentenced the leader of the Flagellants movement in his diocese to be burned.

In the 15th century, about 200 cases of heresy were recorded in the Kingdom of Poland, almost all of which were adjudicated by episcopal courts. Most of them ended with absolution granted to the suspects and the imposition of church penance. Executions occurred in nine cases, six of which took place in the Poznań diocese and three in the Kuyavian diocese. Hardly any records of heresy trials from the Kraków diocese have survived, and there are many indications that it was an area of particularly intense activity of church courts against Hussites, especially during the rule of Bishop Zbigniew Oleśnicki (1423–1455). Additionally, one can count the execution of the Hussite Piotr of Leśnica in Wrocław in 1437, mentioned in one of the chronicles.

The anti-heretical activity of episcopal courts during the Reformation period has not yet been summarized. However, it seems that the only execution took place in Kraków in 1539, where the townswoman Katarzyna Weiglowa was burned at the stake, accused of embracing Judaism and denying the dogma of the Holy Trinity.

=== Inquisitorial activities of papal legates ===
On March 1420, in Wrocław, the Prague citizen Jan Krasy was burned at the stake, becoming one of the more well-known Hussite martyrs. However, the inquisitorial court in his case was presided over not by the local bishop Konrad of Oleśnica or inquisitor Jan of Gliwice, but by the papal legate Fernando de Palacios, the Bishop of Lugo, who was then present in Silesia and called for a crusade against the Czechs. The death sentence was personally approved by the Czech-German king Sigismund of Luxembourg, who was in Wrocław at the time with the legate.

From 1453 to 1454, anti-Hussite and anti-Jewish sermons were preached in Wrocław and Kraków by the legate and apostolic commissioner John of Capistrano, who served as the general inquisitor in the Franciscan Order. During his stay in Wrocław in 1453, 41 Jews accused of ritual murder and desecration of the Host were burned, although his direct involvement in these persecutions is not entirely clear.

=== List of executions of heretics from the judgment of the Inquisition courts ===
Date	Location	President of the Inquisition tribunal	Jurisdiction	Number of killed	Characteristics of victims
1315	Silesia	Paul of Banz O. Cist., titular bishop of Tiberias, auxiliary bishop of Bishop Henry of Wierzbna of Wrocław	episcopal	about 50	Waldenses burned in Wrocław, Świdnica, and Nysa
1319	Toruń	Gerward Leszczyc, Kuyavian bishop	episcopal	2	Beghards from the convent in Kaszczorek
1349	Wrocław	Przecław of Pogorzela, bishop of Wrocław	episcopal	1	The leader of the flagellants movement in Silesia
1398	Wrocław	Jan of Gliwice OP, inquisitor of Wrocław	papal	1	Wycliffite Stefan from Wrocław
1420	Wrocław	Fernando de Palacios, bishop of Lugo and papal legate in the Kingdom of Bohemia	legate	1	Hussite Jan Krasa from Prague
late 1520s	Włocławek	Jan Szafraniec, probably Kuyavian bishop	episcopal	1	Hussite Mikołaj of Kłodawa. The exact date of execution is unknown
1437	Wrocław	Konrad IV the Elder, probably bishop of Wrocław	(episcopal?)	1	Advocate of the Wrocław Consistory Piotr of Leśnica, likely executed as a Hussite
1440s	Poznań	Andrzej Bniński, bishop of Poznań	episcopal	5	The Hussite priests from Zbąszyń. Jan Długosz provides information about their execution in the year 1439, although many authors place it in 1440. However, an analysis of the preserved procedural materials indicates that these executions must have taken place later and not necessarily simultaneously. One of these priests was probably Mikołaj Kłoczek, burned at the stake in 1442
1453	Poznań	Andrzej Bniński, bishop of Poznań	episcopal	1	Hussite Mikołaj Grunberg
1480	Włocławek	Zbigniew Oleśnicki, Kuyavian bishop	episcopal	1	Hussite Mikołaj of Nowa Nieszawa
1499	Włocławek	Krzesław Kurozwęcki, Kuyavian bishop	episcopal	1	Hussite Adam of Radziejów
1508	Kraków	Mikołaj of Żnino OP, inquisitor of Kraków	episcopal	1	A Jew accused of blasphemy and desecration of the Host
1539	Kraków	Piotr Gamrat, bishop of Kraków	episcopal	1	Katarzyna Weiglowa, burned for adopting Judaism

=== Executions of heretics on the basis of verdicts of local authorities ===
The above list must be supplemented by several executions of heretics recorded in sources in the 1420s by local authorities without the involvement of an inquisitor or bishop. It is known that in Poznań around 1425/1426, the city authorities burned two individuals based on charges of heresy brought by the Carmelites. Arbitrary actions also occurred in Silesia, which was engulfed in armed conflict. In 1427, the abbot of the Cistercian monastery in Krzeszów, on the border between Silesia and Bohemia, burned three Hussite farmhands at the stake.

== Papal inquisitors in Poland (1318–1542) ==
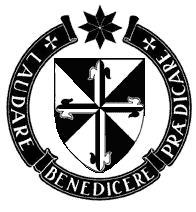
Coat of arms of the Dominican Order. Almost all papal inquisitors operating in Poland were Dominicans

The following lists include all known and documented papal inquisitors operating in the territory of the Polish inquisitorial province, whose boundaries did not correspond to political borders. They are arranged chronologically up to the year 1542, when the synod of Polish bishops decreed a ban on the activities of inquisitors who did not have episcopal mandate within the metropolitan sees of Gniezno and Lviv. Although Dominican tradition also mentions several inquisitors appointed after this date, these accounts have not been critically verified so far.

=== Inquisitors of Kraków and Wrocław in the years 1318–1327 ===
- Peregrine of Opole OP (1318–1327)
- Mikołaj Hospodyniec OFM (appointed in 1318)

=== Inquisitors of Kraków (after 1327) ===
- Stanisław of Bochnia OP (1328?–before 1337)
- Stanisław of Kraków OP (documented in 1344)
- Piotr Kantor OP (documented 1403–1414)
- Mikołaj of Pniewy OP (documented in 1419)
- Jan Polak OP (documented 1422–1428)
- Mikołaj of Brzeście OP (documented 1437–1463?)
- Marcin Kaczer OP (1463–1477)
- Wojciech of Siecień OP (1478–1502)
- Mikołaj of Żnino OP (documented 1505–1530)

=== Inquisitors of Wrocław (after 1327) ===
- Jan Szwenkenfeld OP, inquisitor of Wrocław and Lubusz dioceses (1330–1341)
- Wincenty OP (documented in 1346)
- Jan Strachota OP (documented 1356–1369)
- Otto OP (documented in 1378)
- Jan of Gliwice OP (1397–1428)
- Jan Melzer of Ząbkowice OP (documented 1429–1441)
- Henryk Krelker OP (documented 1444–1450)
- Grzegorz Hejncze OP (1461–1483)
- Jan Wójcik OP (appointed in 1500, d. 1520)

=== Inquisitors of Greater Poland and Mazovia ===
- Mikołaj OP, inquisitor of Greater Poland (documented in 1339)
- Mikołaj of Łęczyca OP, inquisitor of Gniezno and Poznań dioceses (1427–1450) and Włocławek and Płock dioceses (documented 1439–1450)
- Jakub Grzymała OP, inquisitor of Gniezno and Płock dioceses (documented 1454–1466), Poznań and Włocławek dioceses (documented 1454–1461) and Chełmno diocese (appointed in 1461)
- Wincenty Wierzbięta OP, inquisitor of Poznań diocese (appointed in 1461, d. 1494), from 1469 auxiliary bishop of Poznań
- Wojciech of Sochaczew OP, inquisitor of Poznań diocese (appointed in 1505, d. 1529), from 1506 auxiliary bishop of Poznań

=== Inquisitors of Prussia ===
- Wilhelm of Gdańsk OP, inquisitor of Prussia (documented 1333–1335)
- Piotr Wichman OP, inquisitor of Włocławek, Chełmno, Pomesania and Warmia dioceses (1429–1438)
- Mikołaj Grüneberg OP, inquisitor in Toruń (documented in 1465)
- Maciej Floris OP, inquisitor of Chełmno diocese (d. 1482)

In 1550, Pope Julius III, entrusting Bishop Stanislaus Hosius of Chełmno (later Bishop of Warmia and Cardinal) with pastoral care over the Pomesanian diocese in Lutheran Duchy of Prussia, which belonged to the Riga metropolitan province and had been without a Catholic bishop for over 20 years, granted him the title of "inquisitor of heretical perversity" for the area of that diocese in one of the documents.

=== Inquisitors of Ruthenia (after 1456) ===
The inquisitorial tribunal for Ruthenia, based in Lviv, existed since 1381; however, initially, it was not under the provincial of the Polish Dominicans but under the vicar of the Dominican congregation of missionaries Societas Fratrum Peregrinantium. After the fall of Constantinople in 1453, this congregation was dissolved, and three years later, Ruthenian Dominican convents and the local inquisitorial tribunal returned to the Polish province:

- Maciej Konradi OP, inquisitor of Ruthenia (documented 1458–1470)
- Maciej of Kościan OP, inquisitor of the Lviv diocese (1505–1519)

=== Inquisitors of the Grand Duchy of Lithuania ===
- Piotr of Sochaczew OP (1507–1510)

=== Others ===
- Leopold OP, inquisitor Polonie (documented 1382–1386)
- Tomasz of Słupsk OP, inquisitor of Kamień Pomorski diocese (appointed in 1461)
- Johann Tetzel OP, inquisitor per Provinciam Poloniae (1509–1519)
- Stefan OP, inquisitor in Regno et provincia Poloniae (appointed in 1539)

== Bibliography ==
- Barącz, Sadok (1861). Rys dziejów Zakonu Kaznodziejskiego w Polsce. Tom 1. Lwów: nakł. W. Manieckiego.
- Bucichowski, Wacław (1997). "Lista lektorów dominikańskich prowincji polskiej od erygowania prowincji (1225) do roku 1525". Przegląd Tomistyczny. 6–7.
- Bzowski, Abraham (1606). Propago divi Hyacinthi thavmatvrgi Poloni, seu De rebus praeclare gestis in Prouincia poloniae Ordinis Praedicatorum commentarivs. Venice: apud Societam Minimam.
- Chodykiewicz, Klemens (1780). De Rebus Gestis in Provincia Russiæ Ordinis Prædicatorum Commentarius. Berdyczów.
- Lubomelczyk, Seweryn (1594). "De vita miraculis et actis canonizationis Sancti Hyacinthi confessoris Ordinis Fratrum Praedicatorum". 55147 I. Rome.
- Czacki, Tadeusz (1861). O litewskich i polskich prawach o ich duchu, źródłach, związku, i o rzeczach zawartych w pierwszym statucie dla Litwy, 1529 roku wydanym. Vol. 1. Drukarnia "Czasu".
- Dobrowolski, Kazimierz (1924). "Pierwsze sekty religijne w Polsce". Reformacja w Polsce.
- Fontana, Vincenzo Maria (1675). Monumenta Dominicana Breviter in Synopsim Collecta. Rome.
- Gołębiowski, Łukasz (1848). Dzieje Polski za panowania Kaźmirza, Jana Olbrachta i Alexandra. Warsaw.
- Jasienica, Paweł (1979). Polska Jagiellonów. Warsaw: Państwowy Instytut Wydawniczy. ISBN 83-06-00305-5.
- Kras, Paweł (2006). Ad abolendam diversarum haeresium pravitatem. System inkwizycyjny w średniowiecznej Europie. Lublin: Wydawnictwo TN KUL. ISBN 83-7363-431-2.
- Kras, Paweł (2004). "Dominican Inquisitors in medieval Poland (14th-15th)". Praedicatores Inquisitores. Vol. 1: The Dominican and the Mediaeval Inquisition. Acts of the 1st International Seminar on the Dominicans and the Inquisition (Rome; 23-25 February 2002). Rome: Istituto Storico Domenicano.
- Kras, Paweł (1998). Husyci w piętnastowiecznej Polsce. Lublin: Wydawnictwo KUL. ISBN 8387703214.
- Kras, Paweł (1999). "Inkwizycja papieska w walce z husytyzmem". Zeszyty Naukowe Katolickiego Uniwersytetu Lubelskiego (42).
- Kras, Paweł, ed. (2010). Inkwizycja papieska w Europie środkowo-wschodniej. Kraków: Esprit SC. ISBN 978-83-61989-33-2.
  - Kras, Paweł (2010). "Praedicatores – inquisitores – persecutores. Wokół historiograficznego sporu o średniowieczną inkwizycję". In Kras, Paweł (ed.). Inkwizycja papieska w Europie środkowo-wschodniej. Kraków: Esprit SC. pp. 11–34. ISBN 978-83-61989-33-2.
  - Kras, Paweł (2010). "Inkwizycja papieska w Europie Środkowo-Wschodniej. Powstanie i organizacja". In Kras, Paweł (ed.). Inkwizycja papieska w Europie środkowo-wschodniej. Kraków: Esprit SC. pp. 115–145. ISBN 978-83-61989-33-2.
  - Kaczmarek, Krzysztof (2010). "Wykształcenie średniowiecznych inkwizytorów dominikańskich z ziem polskich". In Kras, Paweł (ed.). Inkwizycja papieska w Europie środkowo-wschodniej. Kraków: Esprit SC. ISBN 978-83-61989-33-2.
  - Zdanek, Maciej (2010). "Inkwizytorzy dominikańscy w diecezji krakowskiej w średniowieczu". In Kras, Paweł (ed.). Inkwizycja papieska w Europie środkowo-wschodniej. Kraków: Esprit SC. pp. 219–237. ISBN 978-83-61989-33-2.
  - Świeboda, Wojciech (2010). "Nieznane źródła do dziejów średniowiecznej inkwizycji w Polsce i Czechach w zbiorach rękopiśmiennych Biblioteki Jagiellońskiej". In Kras, Paweł (ed.). Inkwizycja papieska w Europie środkowo-wschodniej. Kraków: Esprit SC. pp. 239–253. ISBN 978-83-61989-33-2.
  - WSzymborski, Wiktor (2010). "Uwagi o odpustach związanych ze średniowieczną inkwizycją w Polsce". In Kras, Paweł (ed.). Inkwizycja papieska w Europie środkowo-wschodniej. Kraków: Esprit SC. pp. 255–268. ISBN 978-83-61989-33-2.
  - AZajchowska, Anna (2010). "Judaizm jako herezja chrystologiczna w kazaniach dominikanina Jana z Ząbkowic (zm. 1446)". In Kras, Paweł (ed.). Inkwizycja papieska w Europie środkowo-wschodniej. Kraków: Esprit SC. pp. 293–307. ISBN 978-83-61989-33-2.
- Madura, Roman Fabian (1972). Acta capitulorum Provinciae Poloniae Ordinis Praedicatorum. Vol. 1. Rome: Pontificium Institutum Studiorum Ecclesiasticorum.
- Patschovsky, Alexander. "Waldenserverfolgung in Schweidnitz 1315". Deutsches Archiv für Erforschung des Mittelalters (36).
- Ryś, Grzegorz (1997). Inkwizycja. Kraków: Znak. ISBN 83-7006-636-4.
- Szymański, Jarosław (2007). Ruchy heretyckie na Śląsku w XIII i XIV wieku. Kraków: Fundacja Zamek Chudów. ISBN 978-83-924607-2-5.
- Wrzesiński, Szymon (2009). Inkwizycja na ziemiach polskich. Zakrzewo: Wydawnictwo REPLIKA. ISBN 978-83-7674-011-9.
