= Henry of Wierzbna =

Polish bishop

- Bishop of Wrocław
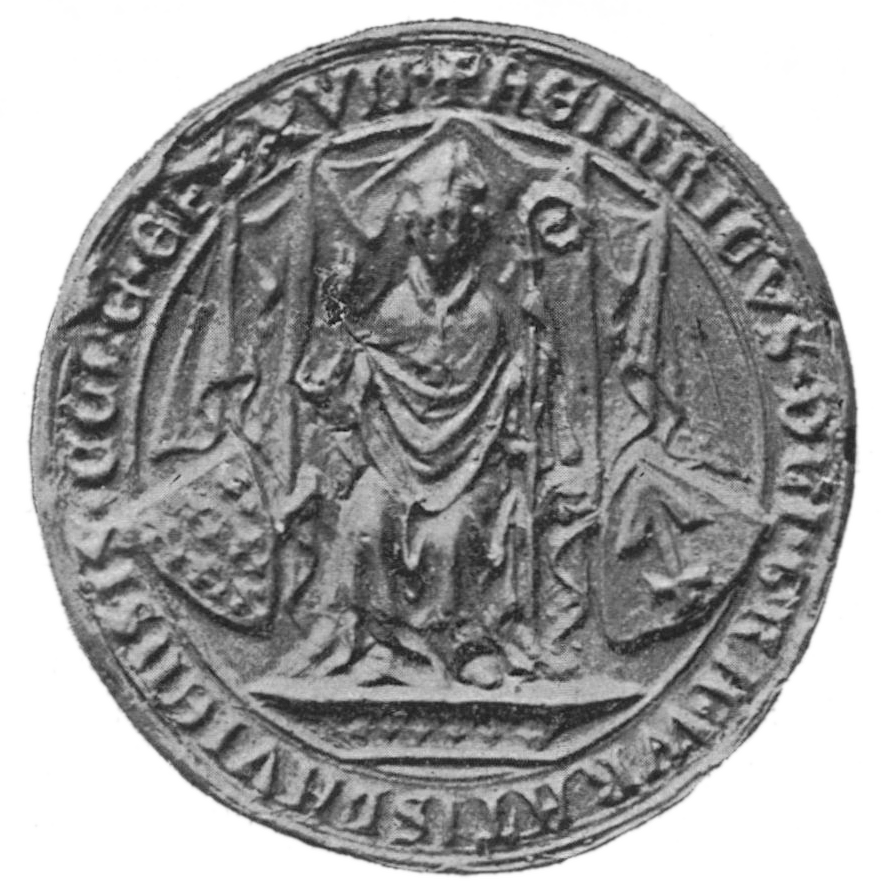
- Church: Roman Catholic
- Diocese: Prince-Bishopric of Wrocław
- In office: 2016–present
- Predecessor: Johann III Romka
- Successor: Sede vacante (then Nanker)

Orders
- Ordination: 1302

Personal details
- Died: 23 September 1319
- Denomination: Catholic

Henry of Wierzbna (Polish: Henryk z Wierzbnej, German: Heinrich von Würben; probably before 1270 – 23 September 1319) was a Bishop of Wrocław in Poland in 1302–1319.

== Life ==
He was born into the Wierzbna noble family of Würben toward the end of the 1260s and was the third and youngest son of John, the Castellan of Ryczyna in Silesia.

He was made a Canon of Wrocław on 31 August 1290 and supported King Wenceslaus II of Bohemia and his relative Jan Muskata, Bishop of Kraków in the dynastic struggles of the day.

He was made bishop in 1302 by Pope Boniface VIII and he was the first of the Bishops of Wrocław to take the princely title.

His time in office was notable for his organization of a Court of the Inquisition in 1315, the result of which included burning at the stake more than 50 people convicted of heresy in the towns of Wrocław, Swidnica and Nysa. His inquisition was particularly against Beguines and Beghards.

He died on 23 September 1319. and was buried in the Wrocław Cathedral. Due to competing claims a replacement Bishop was not appointed for seven years following his death and the diocese was administered by his canon Nicholas of Banz.

Religious titles
Preceded by Johann III Romka	Bishop of Wrocław; 1292–1301	Succeeded by Nankier Kołda
