= Vlčice =

Vlčice may refer to places in the Czech Republic:

- Vlčice (Jeseník District), a municipality and village in the Olomouc Region
- Vlčice (Trutnov District), a municipality and village in the Hradec Králové Region
- Vlčice, a village and part of Blovice in the Plzeň Region
- Vlčice, a village and part of Střížovice (Jindřichův Hradec District) in the South Bohemian Region
