= Banz =

Banz may refer to:

- Banz Abbey, Bavaria, Germany
- Banz (Papua New Guinea), Western Highlands Province, Papua New Guinea
- Gary Banz (born 1945), Republican Oklahoma State Representative
- Stefan Banz (1961–2021), artist and curator
- Nikolaus of Banz, Catholic canon
