= Piotr of Bogoria and Skotnik =

Polish noble

Coat of arms Bogoria

Piotr of Bogoria and Skotnik (Polish: Piotr z Bogorii i Skotnik) (died 1283) was a Polish nobleman (szlachcic) member of the Bogoriowie family of the Bogorya coat of arms.

== Biography ==
He is one of the authors of the victories of the Polish knights at Goźlice. Where with only 600 knights he defeated Leo of Galicia with 6,000. Piotr was castellan of Wiślica about 1268 and voivode of the Sandomierz Voivodeship about 1280.

== Children ==
- Wojciech of Bogoria and Żminogród
- Mikołaj of Bogoria and Skotnik
- Stanisława of Bogoria and Skotnik
- Paweł of Bogoria and Skotnik (died 1331)
- N.N. (daughter) was married to voivode of Kalisz. Her son Janusz Suchywilk of Grzymala coat of arms, became Archbishop of Gniezno after her brother Jarosław.
- Jarosław of Bogoria and Skotnik
