= Mayor Albert's Rebellion =

Rebellion in the Polish city of Kraków

Mayor Albert's Rebellion (Polish: bunt wójta Alberta) was a 1311–12 rebellion by the burghers of the Polish city of Kraków against Duke Władysław I the Elbow-high. The rebellion was led by Albert, the vogt or wójt (Latin: advocatus), who under Magdeburg Law was effectively mayor of Kraków. It ended with the victory of Duke Władysław and the punishment of Kraków townsmen.

== Background ==
After Kraków had been devastated during the 1241 Mongol invasion of Poland, it was re-established in accordance with the Magdeburg Law by Prince Bolesław V the Chaste. In 1291 the Duchy of Kraków fell to the Přemyslid king Wenceslaus II of Bohemia who in 1300 also became King of Poland. Upon the extinction of the Přemyslids in 1306, the Piast duke Władysław I the Elbow-high assumed rule at Kraków, while in 1310 the Bohemian Kingdom passed to the House of Luxembourg. The new king, John of Bohemia, continued to claim the Polish royal title and moreover sought to vassalize the Piast dukes of the adjacent Silesian region.

== Rebellion ==
In 1311 wójt Albert (?-1317), mayor of Kraków (1290-1312), launched a rebellion against the rule of Prince Władysław, with the goal of turning the city – then the capital of the Polish Seniorate Province – over to the Bohemian House of Luxembourg. The rebellion was pro-German and anti-Polish, both politically and culturally. Albert, himself of German or Czech origin, had the support of some of the city's German burghers. He also had the support of Bishop Jan Muskata, himself of German-Silesian origin, and the Silesian duke Bolko I of Opole, as well as of many Kraków citizens. After Władysław laid siege to the city, the revolt ended in failure. Similar rebellions took place in several other cities, particularly Sandomierz and Wieliczka; these were also crushed by Władysław.

== Aftermath ==
Albert fled to Bohemia and his house was demolished, while the Polish Primate Archbishop Jakub Świnka of Gniezno charged Bishop Muskata with being "an enemy of the Polish people". In the aftermath of the rebellion, the city of Kraków lost many of its privileges due to the support some of its burghers gave to the uprising. From Prince Władysław's point of view, the revolt had been motivated by sentiment against Poland and the German subject and citizens proved their disloyalty.

According to a single source, so called Krasiński's Annals, to distinguish the German-speaking burghers of Kraków, the shibboleth Soczewica, koło, miele, młyn ("Lentil, wheel, grinds (verb), mill) was used. Those who could not properly pronounce this phrase were executed.

The uprising was chronicled in a contemporary Latin poem De quodam advocate Cracoviensi Alberto ("About a Certain Reeve Albert of Kraków") written by an anonymous author, which can be described as "germanophobic".
