= Jarosław Bogoria of Skotniki =

Polish nobleman and bishop

His Excellency Jarosław Bogoria of Skotniki
- Archbishop of Gniezno
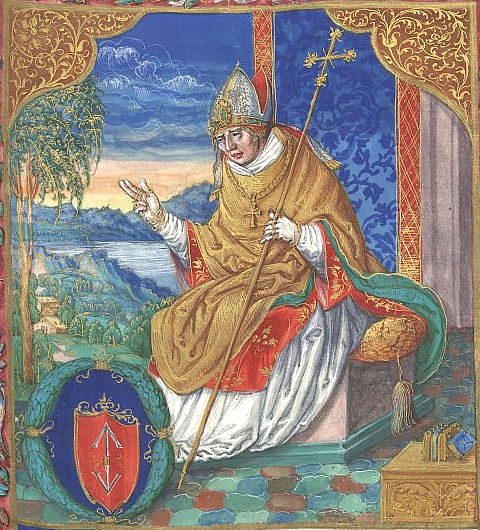
- 16th century illustration from the Catalogus Archiepiscoporum Gnesnensium
- Church: Roman Catholic
- Archdiocese: Gniezno
- Installed: 1342
- Term ended: 1374
- Predecessor: Janisław
- Successor: Janusz Suchywilk

Personal details
- Died: 17 September 1376
- Coat of arms

Jarosław Bogoria of Skotniki (Polish: Jarosław Bogoria ze Skotnik, Jarosław Bogoria Skotnicki) (died 17 September 1376) was a Polish nobleman and bishop, member of the Bogoriowie family of the Bogorya.

== Biography ==
He was a son of Piotr of Bogoria and Skotniki. Jaroslaw studied law and theology at the University of Bologna, becoming provost from 1316 to 1322. Returning home, he became canon of Kraków and chancellor of the bishop of Kraków Nankier. In 1326 he became archdeacon of Kraków and in 1334 canon of Kuyavia and Gniezno. From 1331 until 1337 he was chancellor of Kuyavia. On 8 July 1342 in Avignon, Pope Clement VI appointed him archbishop of Gniezno. In 1374 he resigned for blindness and went to a monastery. He died on 17 September 1376 at Kalisz.

== Legislative activity ==
As a lawyer, he was the redactor of the codification of Polish criminal and civil law made at the behest of King Casimir the Great. He was also the author of the Wiślica and Wielkopolska statutes. In 1357, he convened a provincial synod in Kalisz, which passed 16 resolutions on the law and current affairs of the Church, including a decision to apply ecclesiastical punishments such as the interdict to anyone acting against the clergy or their landed estates.

== Economic activity ==
He was an excellent administrator of the archdiocese entrusted to him. He launched a campaign to transfer old villages to German law, and founded many new ones, bringing colonists from Germany. He led the castellany of Łowicz to flourish. He got into many sharp border disputes with the bishop of Poznanń, especially in Mazovia. He led to the consolidation of the archbishop's estates by buying up more and more land.

== Cultural activities ==
He built many churches and monasteries, and generously endowed those already erected. He rebuilt the Gniezno cathedral, founded churches in Kurzelów, Opatówek, created a collegiate church in Kamien Krajenski and in Uniejów and founded a Benedictine monastery there. He built castles in Łowicz, Uniejów, Kamień Krajeński and Opatówek, bishop's mansions in Gniezno, Kalisz, Wieluń and Łęczyca, and a brick church in his hometown of Skotniki. Around 1355, when Archbishop Jaroslaw Bogoria Skotnicki erected a Gothic brick castle on the site of the old castle in Lowicz, it soon became the residence of the archbishops of Gniezno. In 1359, Archbishop Jaroslaw Bogoria of Skotniki received Siemowit III, Duke of Mazovia, in Skierniewice. In it, the prince, whose state included Skierniewice, confirmed the archbishop's ownership of the area, and bestowed new privileges on the villagers. Archbishop Jaroslav Bogoria was probably the first of the archbishops of Gniezno to permanently reside in his seats in Lowicz and Skierniewice. During his reign, Skierniewice and the entire archbishop's estate began to record economic development and quickly grew into a fairly large settlement that could be transformed into a city.

Catholic Church titles
Preceded by Janisław	Archbishop of Gniezno; 1342–1374	Succeeded by Janusz Suchywilk
