= Janisław =

- Pronunciation: [janˈiswav]
- Gender: male
- Language: Polish
- Name day: 24 June

Other names
- Derived: Jan

Janisław is a Polish name derived from Jan with a typical Slavic ending of -sław.

The name may refer to:

Janisław (unknown—1341), Archbishop of Gniezno
Janisław Sipiński (1913—1994), Polish boxer
Janisław Muszyński (1942—2020), Polish businessman and politician
