= Bogoria family =

The Bogoria family (later clan) coat-of-arms.

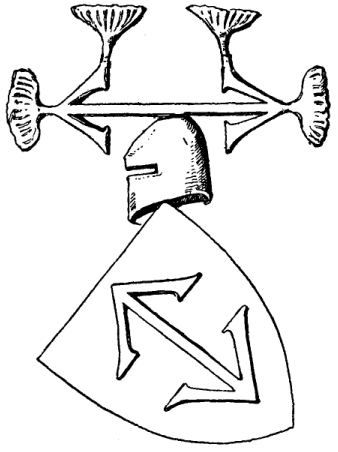
Bogoria

The Bogoria was a family of Polish knights. The family originated from Bogoria in Lesser Poland. The first information about the family dates back to the 12th century. In the 14th century the family got the greatest importance.

== History ==
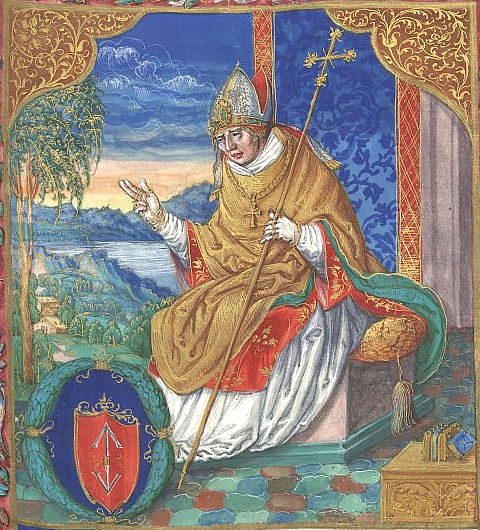
Jarosław z Bogorii i Skotnik

The most representative family members were: Mikolaj (12th century) founder of the Cistercian monastery in Koprzywica in 1185. Mikołaj z Bogorii i Skotnik voivode of Kraków Voivodeship, adviser of King Władysław I Lokietek and diplomat during the first years of reign of King Casimir III of Poland. Jarosław z Bogoryi i Skotnik Archbishop of Gniezno. Mikolaj z Bogorii (?-1381), castellan of Zawichów, supporter of Władysław II Jagiello for the Polish throne and co-initiator of the Polish-Lithuanian Union.

== Notable members ==
- Jarosław z Bogorii i Skotnik
- Piotr z Bogorii i Skotnik
- Stanisława z Bogorii i Skotnik
- Mikołaj z Bogorii i Skotnik
- Wojciech z Bogorii i Żminogrodu

== Bibliography ==
- Nowa Encyklopedia PWN, T-1 A-C, Warszawa 1995, s.503
