= Jakub Świnka =

13th / 14th century Polish Catholic archbishop

His Excellency Jakub Świnka
- Archbishop of Gniezno
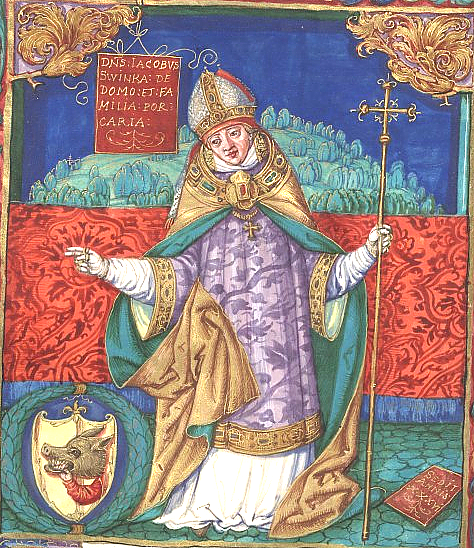
- Church: Roman Catholic
- Archdiocese: Gniezno
- Installed: 1283
- Term ended: 1314
- Predecessor: Martin of Opava
- Successor: Borzysław I

Personal details
- Born: unknown
- Died: 4 March 1314
- Coat of arms

Jakub Świnka (died 4 March 1314) was a Polish Catholic priest, the Archbishop of Gniezno and a notable politician and statesman, supporter of the idea of unification of all Polish lands under the rule of Władysław I the Elbow-high ("the Short"). His coat of arms was Świnka.

== Life ==
Little is known about the early life of Jakub Świnka, nor are his parents known. It is thought he came from a pagan family and his grandmother was a herbalist, which inevitably at that time included elements of paganism. Świnka was a descendant of a noble family from Greater Poland or Silesia coat of arms Świnka. His family started a career in Greater Poland, but with limited success. It is known that his elder brother Sułek did not hold any official posts while his uncle Jan Świnka was mentioned in 1286 as the castellan of a town of Spycimierz.

Jakub Świnka probably joined the Catholic priesthood and it is also probable that he graduated from a law school – probably in Kraków or Prague. In the 1270s he was promoted to the post of a cantor of the chapter in Gniezno. For his service to the Dukes of Greater Poland, most notably to Bolesław the Pious and to Przemysł II he was awarded, on 8 January 1294, with the village of Polanowo.

Świnka was consecrated as archbishop in Kalisz on 30 July 1283 and the results of the voting were accepted by Pope Martin IV on 19 December the same year. The election of a Polish archbishop was seen by the rulers of Greater Poland as a chance to break the links with the Holy Roman Empire, and on 1 August 1284 Duke Przemysł II granted the bishops of Gniezno with a privilege to mint their own coins. This strengthened their power significantly.

From the earliest days of his reign, Świnka faced a strong opposition to his rule. The most important issues were the problem of the diocese of Włocławek (to which belonged both the cities of Słupsk and Gdańsk) that was claimed both by the Polish bishop of Gniezno and the German bishops of Merseburg, and the struggle for dominance over the Catholics in Poland between Polish and German hierarchs. The latter problem was seen as the most important, since several monasteries in Lower Silesia decided to break the links with its Polish-Bohemian province and apply for membership in the Saxon branch of the Franciscan order.

To counter the expansion of German, Świnka organized a synod that took place on 6 January 1285 in Łęczyca. During the meeting, he ordered all priests that were subject to his bishopric to give their sermons in Polish rather than German. To further unify the church in Poland he also organized a series of synods held every couple of years, which served as a means to control the changes within the church. The synods were:

1. Łęczyca, 6 January 1285
2. Łęczyca, 26 October 1287
3. Gniezno, 14 October 1290
4. Gniezno, April 1298
5. unknown place, May 1306
6. Gniezno, May 1309

As a politician, Jakub Świnka was a strong supporter of the idea of re-unification of Poland, divided onto separate duchies after the death of Bolesław III Wrymouth. To unify the Polish lands culturally and oppose the aggressive German culture, he strongly promoted the cult of St. Adalbert of Prague, one of the patron saints of Poland. To further his cause, he tried to diminish the tensions between the dukes of various parts of Poland and the Catholic bishops. This was the case with bishop of Wrocław Tomasz II Zaremba and the Duke of Silesia Henry IV the Righteous, whom Świnka wanted to reconcile.

Jakub Świnka was also a strong supporter of Duke of Greater Poland Przemysł II. Until recently it was believed that Świnka was the main architect of an alliance signed in 1287 by the most notable dukes of Poland of the Piast dynasty, among them Henry IV the Righteous, Leszek the Black, Przemysł II and Henry III of Głogów. However, recent studies show that the ongoing conflicts between the dukes of various parts of divided Poland make the existence of such an alliance highly unlikely.

However, after the congress of Kalisz, held in January 1293, such an alliance between Przemysł II, Wladislaus the Short and his brother Casimir II was indeed concluded. The three dukes agreed to support each other in the effort of retaking the lands of Lesser Poland conquered by Wenceslaus II of Bohemia. Świnka was to become a full member of the alliance, probably responsible for propaganda and gathering support of the Pope and the Catholic Church. On 12 January he was also promised a huge reward if Kraków is taken: 300 golden coins a year from the salt mines of Wieliczka and additional 100 golden coins a year for three years after the victory.

On 26 July 1295 Jakub Świnka concluded his first major political victory: despite lack of papal acceptance, he crowned Przemysł II the King of Poland in the cathedral of Gniezno. Although the ruler controlled only a small part of the Polish domain, he was given a powerful weapon against the Bohemian rulers who also had claims to the Polish throne. Because of great authority of the bishop, the act of coronation was not questioned by any European ruler of the epoch. However, the reign of Przemysł II lasted only 7 months: on 8 February 1296 he was murdered in Rogoźno by the Brandenburgians. Following the treaty Kalisz, Świnka backed up Wladislaus the Short, whom he considered the strongest of the candidates to the throne of Greater Poland and Pomerania, and possibly the only ruler who could reunite Poland and liberate it of Bohemian influence.

Wladislaus assumed the power in Greater Poland and Pomerania, and added those lands to his tiny domain of Cuyavia. However, the struggle against other pretenders (Henry III of Głogów and Wenceslaus II of Bohemia) weakened his rule and finally led to a conflict with the Catholic hierarchy. Świnka broke the pacts he had with Wladislaus, and on 25 July 1300 crowned Wenceslaus II as the King of Poland. It is probable that he lost his belief in weak Wladislaus and saw the new king as the Slavic ruler who could be able to group all Polish lands in one hand. However, the new ruler adopted a pro-German position and started promoting Germanized Silesians over Polish-speaking priests and politicians. Since 1304 king Wenceslaus also supported Jan Muskata, Kraków bishop of German-Silesian origin, in his struggle for separation of the Diocese of Kraków from the bishopric of Gniezno, which only embittered the conflict. This led to yet another vote, after which Świnka resumed good relation with dukes of Cuyavia, relatives of defeated Wladislaus.

After the sudden death of Wenceslaus II on 21 June 1305, Świnka yet again supported Wladislaus. It is not known how he reacted to assassination of Wenceslaus' son, Wenceslaus III of Bohemia less than a year later. After a short fight, Wladislaus recaptured all his lands in Cuyavia, and then conquered Lesser Poland and Pomerania. Greater Poland, to which the city of Gniezno belongs, was conquered by Henry III of Głogów and Jakub Świnka moved to Uniejów and Łowicz, cities controlled by Wladislaus.

On 20 March 1306 Świnka restarted the conflict against Jan Muskata. This time the bishop of Kraków was not backed by the rulers of Bohemia who lost all their influence in Poland, while Świnka was strongly endorsed by Wladislaus. This led to Muskata being deprived of his post on 14 June 1308. The archbishop of Gniezno resumed his control over Lesser Poland. However, after 1311 there are no mentions of his political activity. It is probable that he retired due to old age and poor health.

He died on 4 March 1314 and was buried in St. George's Church, Gniezno. It took another six years for his protégé Wladislaus to finally reunite Poland and be crowned as Polish king.

== See also ==
- Nanker
- Kingdom of Poland (1025–1385)

Catholic Church titles
Preceded by Martin of Opava	Archbishop of Gniezno; 1283–1314	Succeeded by Borzysław I
