= Katarzyna Weiglowa =

Polish Jewish martyr (c. 1460 – 1539)

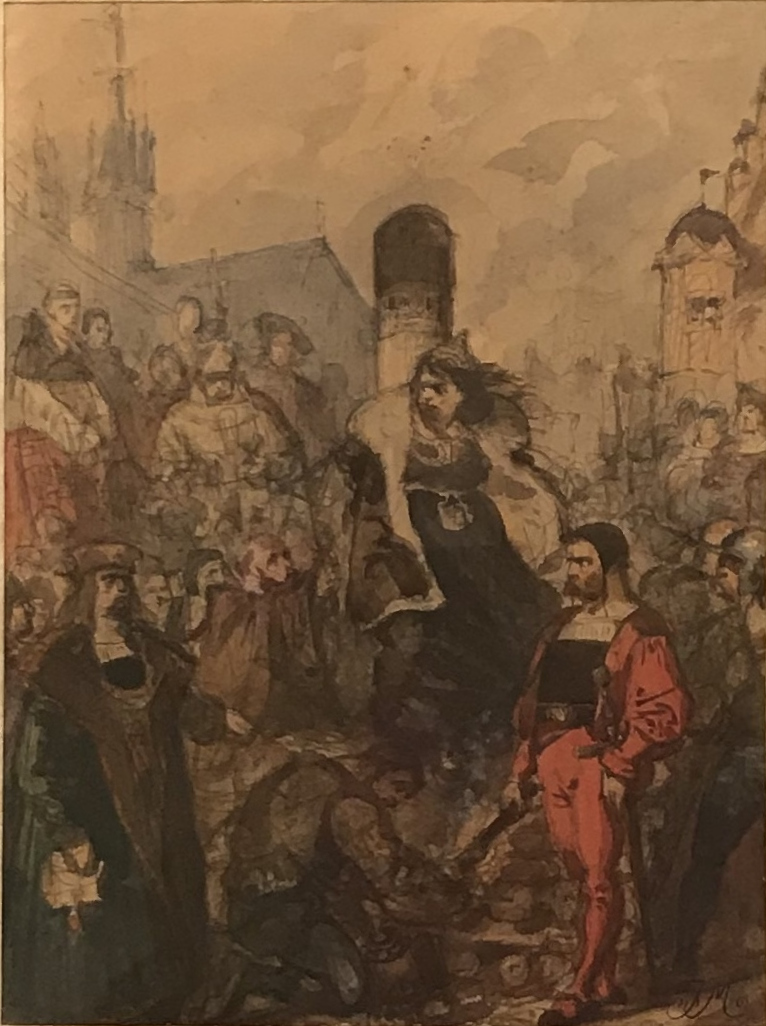
- Burning of Katarzyna Weiglowa (Malcherowa) by Jan Matejko 1859
- Born: Katarzyna Zalasowska c.1460
- Died: 19 April 1539 (aged 80); Kraków, Kingdom of Poland
- Cause of death: burned at the stake for apostasy
- Other names: Katarzyna Waiglowa, Catherine Vogel
- Known for: regarded by Unitarians and Jews as a martyr
- Spouse: Melchior Weigel
- Parents: Stanisław Zalasowski (father); widow of Melchior Weigel (mother)

Katarzyna Weiglowa (Wajglowa) (German: Katherine Weigel; given erroneously in a Polish source of 17c. as Vogel (c.1459–1539), and known in many English sources as Catherine Vogel (Note: "Vogel" appears in the 1995 Harvard edition of Stanisław Lubieniecki's History of the Polish Reformation and Nine Related Documents, translated and annotated by George Huntston Williams, but with a footnote stating that Lubieniecki had erroneously given "Vogel", and mentioning that Katarzyna, who had been born "Zalaszowska", had married Melchior Weigel, a city councillor; and that in the sources she was called Zalaszowska, Weiglowa, or Melcherowa (-owa meaning "wife of," -ówna meaning "daughter of" -owska not showing the difference); and that some of those sources, which had disappeared, had survived in excerpts from the acts of the trial in Polish translation: Julian Bukowski, Dzieje Reformacji w Polsce 1 (Kraków, 1883) 176-79. Wojciech (Adalbert) Węgierski, pastor of the Kraków District of the Reformed Church had preserved in Polish and Latin important documents in the archive of the Kraków congregation; Kronika zboru krakowskiego (Kraków, 1817): Harvard Theological Studies Vol. 37 (Minneapolis, 1995) p. 437, at footnote 162.); c. 1460 – 19 April 1539) was a Polish woman who was burned at the stake for apostasy by the Polish Inquisition. She converted from Roman Catholicism to Judaism or to Judaizing nontrinitarianism, and was executed in Kraków after she refused to call Jesus Christ the Son of God. She is regarded by Unitarians and Jews (among others) as a martyr.

== Early life ==
She was born Katarzyna Zalasowska, a daughter of Stanisław Zalasowski and widow of Melchior Weigel, merchant and councilman of Kraków. In the Jewish Encyclopedia she appears under a variant spelling of her maiden name as Catherine Zelazowska. Little is known about her life before 1529–1530 when she appeared several times before an episcopal court in Kraków, and refused to abjure "mistakes of the Jewish faith".

== Accusation of apostasy ==
Catherine probably started professing nontrinitarianism under the influence of writings by Martin Borrhaus, published in 1527. The Jewish Encyclopedia suggests that she followed the example of a daughter of Mikołaj II Radziwiłł and embraced Judaism. She tried to promote her views during the Sejm debates in 1538–1539.

At the age of 70, Catherine was imprisoned in Kraków under the charge of confessing "heresy" by the order of Piotr Gamrat, bishop of Kraków, who had accused her before Queen Bona.

== Execution ==
She admitted professing the unity of God, and rejecting the notion of "Holy Trinity". She spent ten years in prison, before she was burnt alive at the stake on the Little Market place in Kraków at the age of 80. According to written testimonies, even on the stake she refused to abjure her faith which she confessed loudly until the end. Because of her Nontrinitarian views Catherine was not defended by Polish Protestants. However, after her death believers from different branches of Protestantism have often referred to her as a victim of religious persecutions and a martyr.

== Aftermath ==
The burning of Catherine was a surprising incident in Poland, which, in the 16th century, ranked among the countries with the highest degree of religious tolerance.

After her death her fate faded into obscurity in Poland. The Sejm in 1539 did not take a stance on her execution, and mentions of her have been preserved mainly in Protestant polemical writings and in Judeophobic literature from the 17th century.
