= Mikołaj of Bogoria and Skotnik =

Polish nobleman (died c. 1338)

Mikołaj of Bogoria and Skotnik (Polish: Mikołaj z Bogorii i Skotnik, died ca. 1338) was a Polish nobleman (szlachcic), member of the Bogoriowie family of the Bogorya Coat of Arms.

Mikolaj was Podkomorzy of Kraków from 1318 until 1330 and voivode of Kraków Voivodship from 1330 until 1338. He became an adviser of King Wladyslaw I Lokietek and was diplomat during the first years of reign of King Casimir III of Poland.

He was son of Piotr of Bogoria and Skotnik.
