= Peregrine of Opole =

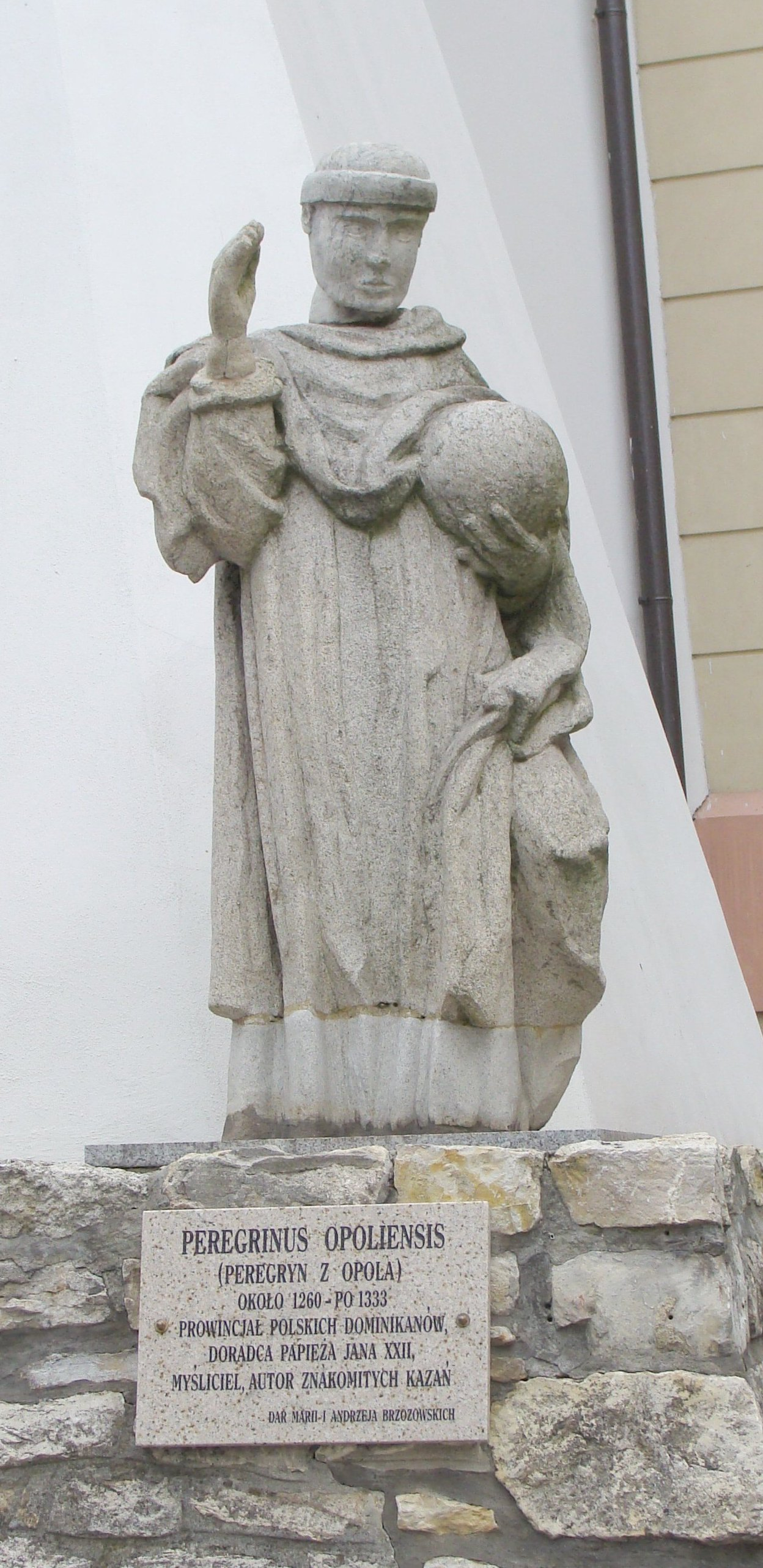
Peregrine of Opole

Peregrine of Opole (c. 1260 – 1335) was a Silesian Dominican friar. He was twice elected a provincial of his Order and became designated an inquisitor of Wrocław by the pope John XXII.

His major literary achievement is his twofold collection of Latin sermons: Sermones de tempore (sermons on the feasts of the liturgical year) and Sermones de sanctis (sermons on feasts of particular saints).
