= Nikolaus of Banz =

Polish priest

Nicholas of Banz
- Administrator of the Diocese of Wrocław
- Church: Roman Catholic
- Diocese: Wrocław
- In office: 1319–1326

Personal details
- Occupation: canon; archdeacon; diocesan administrator; mediator

Nicholas of Banz, also known as Nikolaus von Banz, was a Roman Catholic canon and an important mediator in the dynastic struggles of 13th century Poland and for a time was administrator of the diocese of Wroclaw.

Nicholas came from a patrician family and by 1305 AD was a canon in the Roman Catholic Archdiocese of Wrocław. From 1308 to 1315 he was Archdeacon of Legnica and from 1326 to his death he was prelate at Breslau Cross pen.

Nicholas was a skilful negotiator and acted as a mediator on several occasions. Following the death of Bishop Henry of Würben in 1319 no bishop sat in Wroclaw for 7 years. This was due to the conflicting claims of two candidates (Vitus Habdank and Lutold of Kremsier) so during this time Nicholas acted as administrator. As diocese administrator Nicholas was an advisor to Henry VI. His support for Henry VI lead to Nicholas being abducted by forces loyal to Henry's brother Bolesław and he was held till 1327. Nicholas mediated the conflict between his successor Bishop Nanker and John of Bohemia. Skilful negotiations by Nicholas, removed monetary claims of the papal legates, Peter of Auvergne and Galhard de Garceribus.

Religious titles
| Preceded by Johann III Romka | Administrator of Wrocław Diocese; 1292–1301 | Succeeded by Henryk z Wierzbnej |
