= Wojciech of Bogoria and Żminogród =

Polish nobleman

Wojciech of Bogoria and Żminogród (Polish: Wojciech z Bogorii i Żminogrodu, died ca. 1316) was a Polish nobleman (szlachcic), member of the Bogoriowie family of the Bogorya Coat of Arms. He was son of Piotr of Bogoria and Skotnik.

Wojciech was voivode of the Sandomierz Voivodship from 1306 to 1316.
