= Vlčice (Jeseník District) =

- Municipality
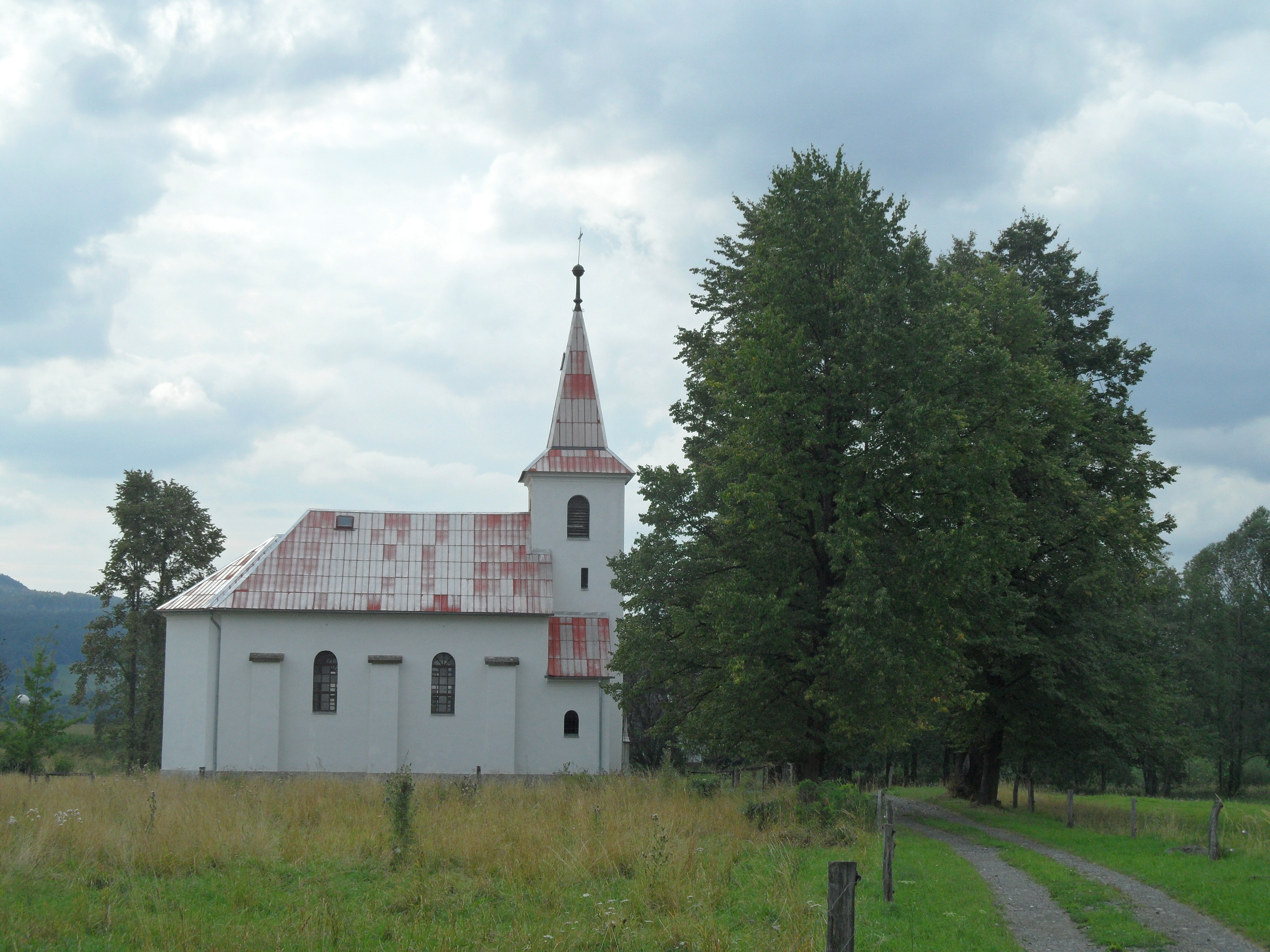
- Chapel of Immaculate Conception in Dolní Les

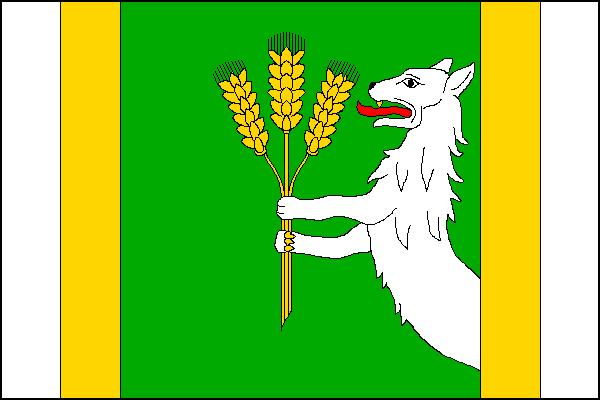
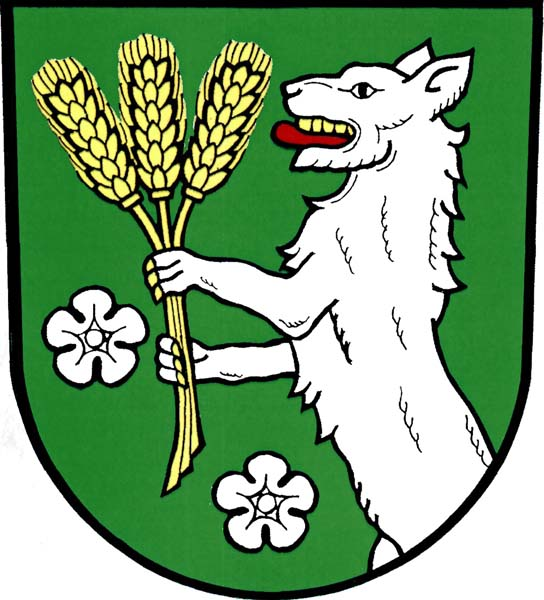
- Flag Coat of arms

- Location in the Czech Republic
- Coordinates: 50°20′43″N 17°2′46″E
- Country: Czech Republic
- Region: Olomouc
- District: Jeseník
- Founded: 1248

Area
  - Total: 18.64 km^{2} (7.20 sq mi)
- Elevation: 339 m (1,112 ft)

Population (2026-01-01)
  - Total: 452
  - Density: 24.2/km^{2} (62.8/sq mi)
- Time zone: UTC+1 (CET)
  - Summer (DST): UTC+2 (CEST)
- Postal code: 790 67
- Website: www.vlcice.cz

Vlčice (German: Wildschütz) is a municipality and village in Jeseník District in the Olomouc Region of the Czech Republic. It has about 500 inhabitants.

== Administrative division ==
Vlčice consists of four municipal parts (in brackets population according to the 2021 census):

- Vlčice (310)
- Bergov (29)
- Dolní Les (16)
- Vojtovice (17)

== Geography ==
Vlčice is located about 17 kilometres (11 mi) northwest of Jeseník and 84 km (52 mi) north of Olomouc. It lies on the border between the Golden Mountains and Vidnava Lowland. The highest point is at 765 m (2,510 ft) above sea level. The stream Studená voda flows through the municipality.

== History ==
Vlčice was founded in 1248 by a lokator called Vrocivoj, who was commissioned by Bishop Tomasz I. In 1371, Knight Albert Schoff was documented as the owner of Vlčice. The Schoff family founded here a water fortress in the 15th century and owned the village until 1558. From 1582 to 1791, Vlčice was a property of the Maltitz family. Then the village was inherited by the Schaffgotsch family, who held it until 1921.

== Demographics ==
Historical population

Year	Pop.	±%
1869	2,030	—
1880	2,042	+0.6%
1890	1,978	−3.1%
1900	1,772	−10.4%
1910	1,608	−9.3%

Year	Pop.	±%
1921	1,686	+4.9%
1930	1,661	−1.5%
1950	830	−50.0%
1961	754	−9.2%
1970	619	−17.9%

Year	Pop.	±%
1980	569	−8.1%
1991	444	−22.0%
2001	459	+3.4%
2011	386	−15.9%
2021	372	−3.6%

Source: Censuses

== Transport ==
The I/60 road, which connects Jeseník with the Czech–Polish border, runs through the municipality.

== Sights ==
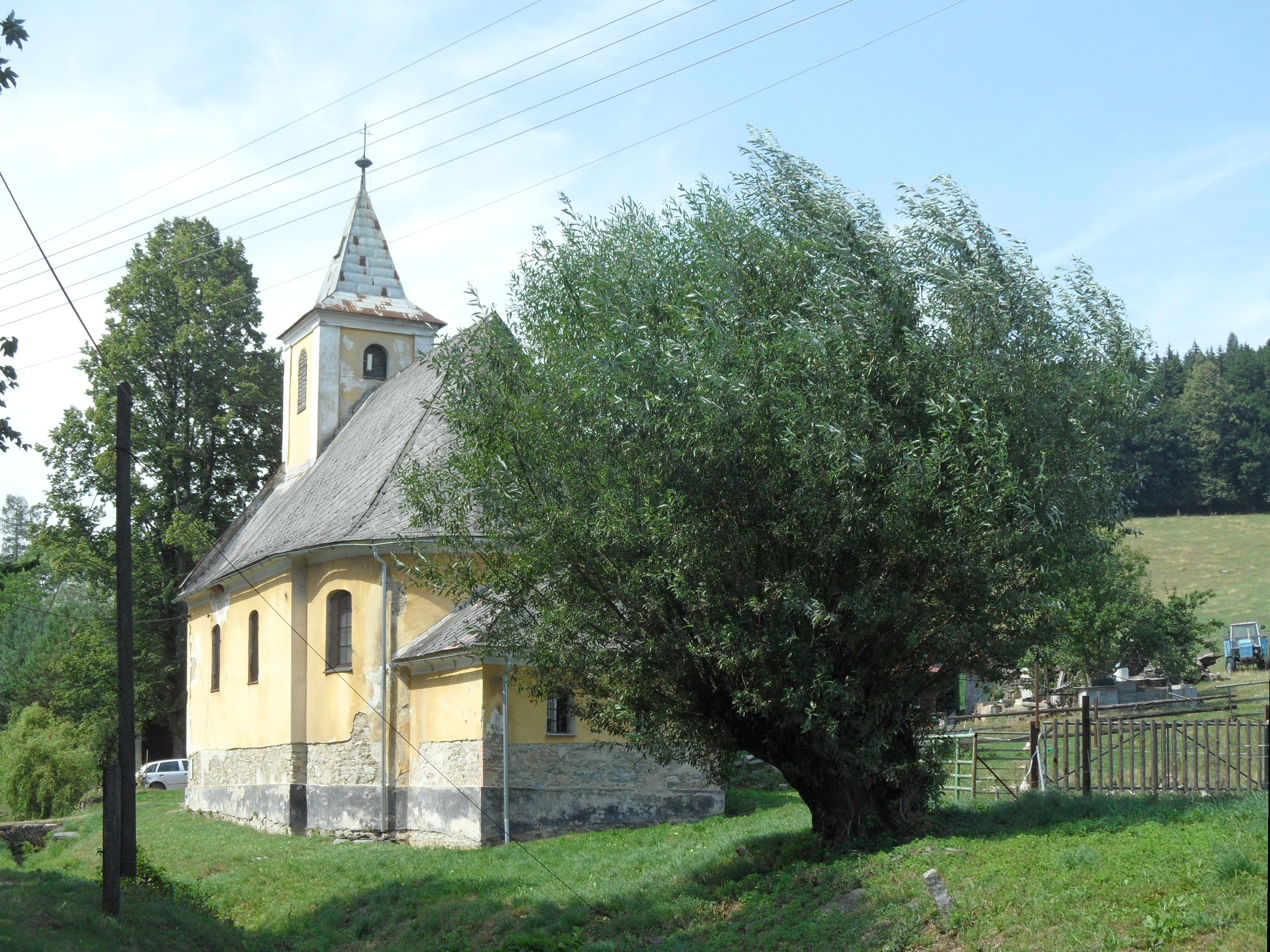
Church of Saint Ignatius

The main landmark of Vlčice is the Church of Saint Bartholomew. It was built in the Baroque style in 1749–1751.

The Church of Saint Ignatius is located in Vojtovice. It was built in the Neoclassical style in 1833, on the site of a chapel from around 1500.

A notable building is the Vlčice Castle. The former water fortress was rebuilt into the Renaissance castle in 1665, during the rule of the Maltitz family. In 1829, part of the castle was rebuilt in the Empire style and the castle park with an area of 40 ha (99 acres) was established. In the second half of the 20th century, the castle was insensitively renovated and lost its architectural value.

== Twin towns – sister cities ==
Vlčice is twinned with:

- Biała, Poland
