= Borzysław I =

His Excellency Borzysław I
- Archbishop of Gniezno
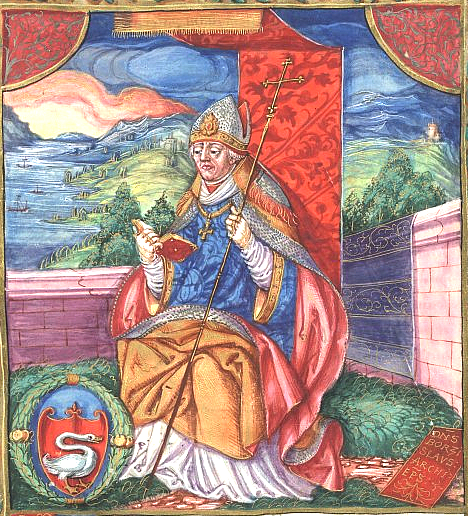
- Church: Roman Catholic
- Archdiocese: Gniezno
- Installed: 1316
- Term ended: 1317
- Predecessor: Jakub Świnka
- Successor: Janisław

Personal details
- Born: unknown
- Died: 14 January 1317
- Coat of arms

Borzysław I (died probably on 30 June 1317) was the Archbishop of Gniezno from 1316 to 1317. Neither the date nor place of his birth are known and little is known about his origins, career or his short Episcopacy.

In 1314, the chapter of the cathedral of Gniezno elected Borzysław as Archbishop, so he went to Avignon for Pope Clement V to confirm the choice. However, Clement V died, and it took two years to determine his successor, Pope John XXII. In 1317 Borzysław again returned to Avignon where his selection was confirmed and consecrated by John XXII. However, while awaiting clearance Borzysław himself suddenly died.

Religious titles
Preceded by Jakub Świnka	Archbishop of Gniezno; 1314 - 1317	Succeeded by [Janisław
