= Bogoria coat of arms =

Polish coat of arms

Bogoria
- Battle cry: Bogoryja
- Alternative names: Bogorya, Bogoryja, Boguryja
- Earliest mention: 1321/22
- Cities: Grodzisk Mazowiecki
- Gminas: Gmina Bogoria, Gmina Baranow, Gmina Buczek, Gmina Opatówek,
- Families: 85 names B Balczewski, Bogdanowicz, Bogoria, Bogorya, Bohomolec, Bojarski, Bosiacki, Braczkowski, Bruczkowski, Buczkowski, Budźko, Budźkowski. C Chechelski, Chechłowski, Cienkiewicz, Cienkowski, Corski. G Gniazdowsk, Gorbaczewski, Gorski, Gościeradowski. H Horbaczewski. J Jamiński, Jarocki. K Kampka, Kolanowski, Korzeniecki, Kożuchowski, Kurzeniewski, Kwaskowski. Ł Łowmiański M Macanowicz, Macenowicz, Maciejewicz, Maciejowicz, Maciejowski, Macienowicz, Mackiewicz, Magnowski, Magnuski, Maruszewski, Minowski, Mokranowski, Mokrjewicz, Mokronoski, Mokronowski. O Ochowski, Olszewski. P Paszkiewicz, Phoski, Podlecki, Podleski, Podlewski, Podłęski, Pohoski, Porembski, Porębski, Prozwicki, Przedomski. R Rakoza, Rakusa, Rakuza, Rostropowicz. S Skapiewicz, Skolnicki, Skotnicki, Staszkowski, Strujłowski, Suszczewski, Szczęsnowicz. Ś Światkiewicz, Świątkiewicz. T Tarnawski, Tarnowski, Trojanowicz. W Wissiger, Wissygier, Wołłowicz, Wołowicz, Wystynga. Z Zabacki, Zakrzewski, Zakrzowski, Złotorowicz, Zubacki.

Bogoria is a Polish coat of arms. It was used by several szlachta families in medieval Poland and later under the Polish–Lithuanian Commonwealth, branches of the original medieval Bogoriowie family as well as families connected with the Clan by adoption.

== History ==
The coat of arms was first attributed to Michał Bogorya, whose name was first recorded in the papers of Trzemeszno monastery, when he was given the title of count, and in a decree granting privileges to the Holy Cross monastery near Sandomierz around 1069. According to legend, Bolesław II the Bold (Bolesław Śmiały), armed with only 3,000 of his cavalry, attacked a much larger band of Polovtsy near Snowskie, striking down their leader. During the battle a colonel called Michał Bogorya proved extraordinary courage and bravery, bearing several wounds and arrows in his body. Bolesław, upon returning from the battle and hearing of his bravery, saw Bogorya and extracted the arrows from his chest, broke them with his own hands and conferred them on Bogorya and his descendants as an eternal honour.

== Blazon ==
The coat of arms consists of two broken white (or silver) arrows pointing in opposite directions—one up and one down—on a red (or blue/green) field. The helm bears a peacock with its tail spread and its beak pointing to the shield's right, holding an arrow likewise broken and twisted upward.

== Notable bearers ==
Notable bearers of this coat of arms include:

- Bogoriowie (knights)
  - Jarosław z Bogorii i Skotnik
  - Piotr z Bogorii i Skotnik
  - Stanisława z Bogorii i Skotnik
  - Mikołaj z Bogorii i Skotnik
  - Wojciech z Bogorii i Żminogrodu
- The family of Mstislav Rostropovich, Russian cellist and conductor of Polish descent
- Marcjan Dominik Wołłowicz
- Andrzej Mokronowski
- Władysław Wołłowicz
- Franciszek Bohomolec
- Ostafi Wołłowicz

== Gallery ==
Coat of Arms of Counts Wołłowicz (Gajl/Siebmacher)

Coat of Arms of Counts Wołłowiczów (HKP)

Coat of Arms of Białozór family

Bogoria II - Coat of Arms of Górski, Gwiazdowski and Tur family - variant I

Bogoria II - Coat of Arms of Górski, Gwiazdowski and Tur family - variant II

Kurzeniec - Coat of Arms of Dworak, Kurzeniecki, Osiecki, Truskoleśny and Wieliński family

Herb własny rodziny Porębnych

Paintings

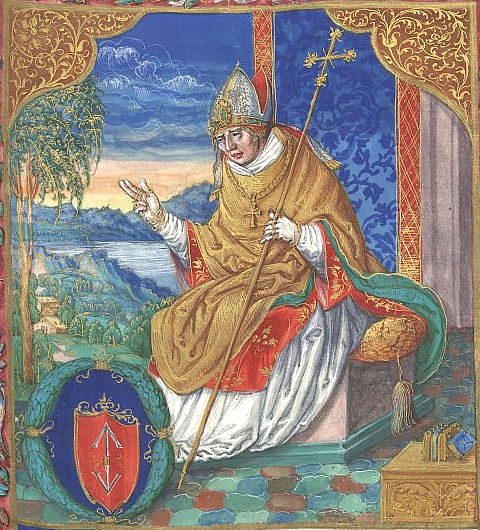
Bogoria on the painting of Bishop Jarosław Bogoria Skotnicki

== See also ==
- Polish heraldry
- Heraldic family
- List of Polish nobility coats of arms

== Bibliography ==
- Kasper Niesiecki, Jan Nepomucen Bobrowicz: Herbarz polski Kaspra Niesieckiego S. J. T. 3. Lipsk: Breitkopf i Haertel, 1841, s. 194-198.
- Tadeusz Gajl: Herbarz polski od średniowiecza do XX wieku : ponad 4500 herbów szlacheckich 37 tysięcy nazwisk 55 tysięcy rodów. L&L, 2007. ISBN 978-83-60597-10-1.
- Alfred Znamierowski: Herbarz rodowy. Warszawa: Świat Książki, 2004, s. 91. ISBN 83-7391-166-9.
- Józef Szymański: Herbarz średniowiecznego rycerstwa polskiego. Warszawa: PWN, 1993, s. 86-88. ISBN 83-01-09797-3.
- Józef Szymański: Herbarz rycerstwa polskiego z XVI wieku. Warszawa: DiG, 2001, s. 209. ISBN 83-7181-217-5.
