= Stefan Banz =

Swiss artist (1961–2021)

- Born: 11 September 1961; Sursee, Switzerland
- Died: 16 May 2021 (aged 59)
- Occupations: Artist and curator

Stefan Banz (11 September 1961 – 16 May 2021) was an artist and curator.

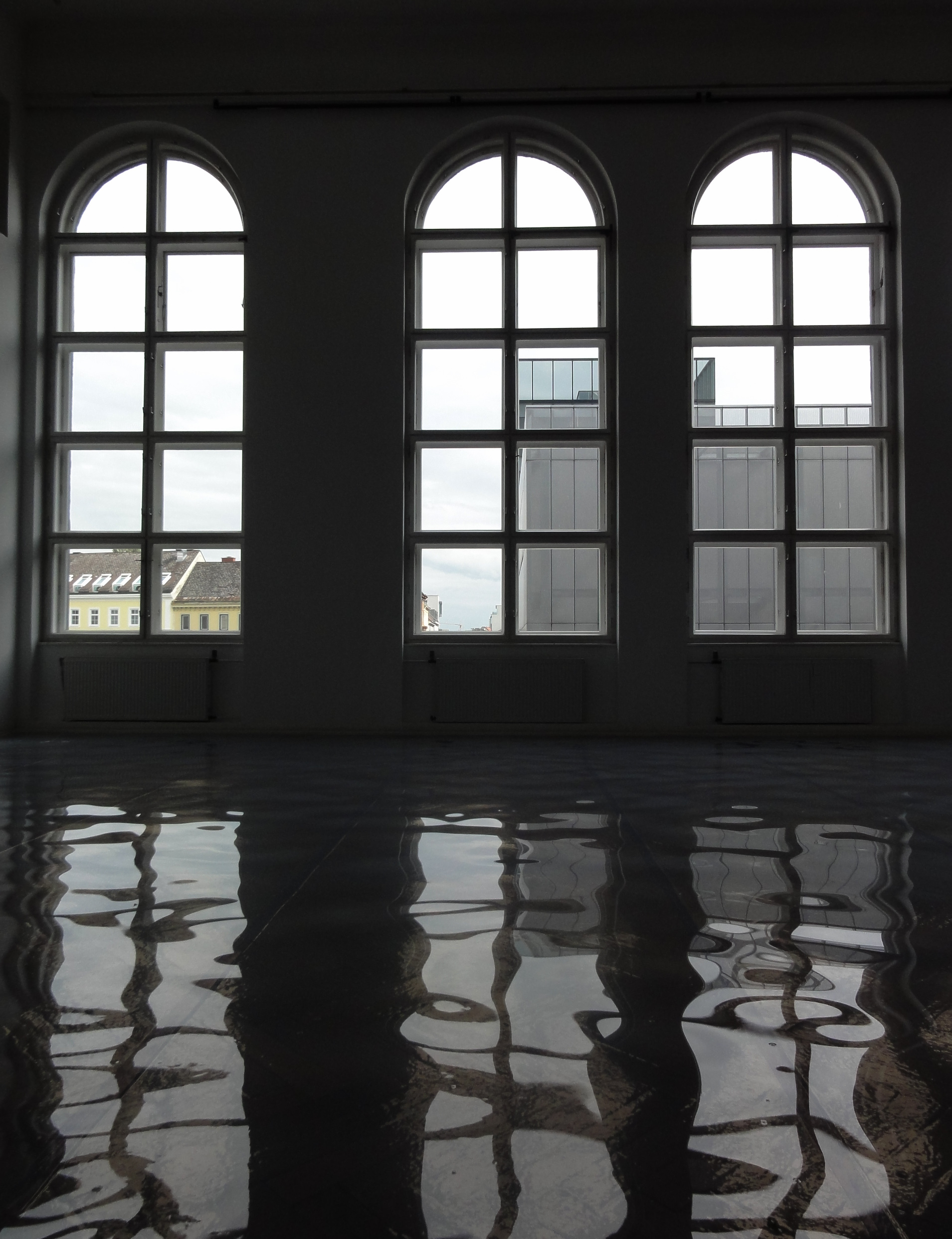
Stefan Banz Installation: "Dive. Give the people what they want", Offenes Kulturhaus, Linz, Austria 1996

Banz was born in Sursee, Switzerland, and grew up in Menznau. In 1989, he co-founded the Kunsthalle Luzern and served as its artistic director until 1993. From 1994 to 1997 he was an artistic advisor for the Hauser & Wirth Gallery in Zurich, where he organised exhibitions with Gerhard Richter, Francis Picabia, Bruce Nauman and others. In 2005, he was the curator for the Swiss Pavilion at the 51st Biennale in Venice. He was also a member of the Swiss Federal Art Committee from 2001 to 2007.

As an artist, he participated in solo and group exhibitions in international galleries, art institutions and museums, such as Württembergischer Kunstverein, Stuttgart; Migros Museum für Gegenwartskunst, Zurich; Kunstmuseum Lucerne, Kunsthaus Zurich, Walker Art Center Minneapolis. In 2000, he received the Manor Art prize, as well as the Recognition Award from the City of Lucerne, Switzerland. Since 2004, he worked together with Caroline Bachmann under the name of Bachmann/Banz. In 2007, Bachmann/Banz won the 'Werkbeitrag' Award.

Banz also wrote plays, novels, theoretical texts and critical essays about artists and personalities such as Jacques Derrida, Muhammad Ali, Bruce Nauman, Frank Zappa and Marcel Duchamp.

== Public collections ==
- Migros Museum für Gegenwartskunst
- Kunsthaus Zürich
- Kunstmuseum Lucerne
- Museum CentrePasquArt, Biel
- Kunstmuseum Liechtenstein

== Publications ==
- 1991 Serendipity, Helmhaus, Zurich, ISBN 3-906396-08-8
- 1993 Kunsthalle Lucerne, Lucerne, ISBN 3-906655-13-X
- 1995 Give me a Leonard Cohen Afterworld, Cantz Verlag, Ostfildern/Stuttgart, ISBN 3-89322-720-2
- 1996 Dive. Give the people what they want, Offenes Kulturhaus, Linz, ISBN 3-85307-010-8
- 1996 Platz der Luftbrücke, Ein Gespräch mit Friedrich Kittler, Edited by Iwan Wirth, Oktagon Cologne, ISBN 3-89611-021-7
- 1997 Stefan Banz & Iwan Wirth (Ed.), Francis Picabia «Fleurs de chair, fleurs d’àme», Oktagon Verlag, Cologne, ISBN 3-89611-031-4
- 1998 Echos, 01/3, Edited by Manuel Bonik, Berlin
- 1999 i built this garden for us, Edition Patrick Frey, Zurich, ISBN 3-905509-23-7
- 1999 a shot away some flowers, Edition Patrick Frey, Zurich, ISBN 3-905509-28-8
- 2000 Echoes, Exhibitions, Projects, 1992–2000, Odermatt Edition, Dallenwil, Switzerland, ISBN 3-9521186-9-9
- 2001 Hell, Novel, Salon Verlag, Cologne, ISBN 3-89770-118-9
- 2001 Komplexes System Kunst, Edited by Hermann Korte, Lit Verlag, Münster-Hamburg-London, ISBN 3-8258-5254-7
- 2002 The Muhammad Ali's, Verlag für moderne Kunst, Nuremberg, ISBN 3-933096-80-4
- 2003 Un coeur simple, Edition Fink Zurich, ISBN 3-906086-52-6
- 2004 Tokyo Bites, Triton Verlag, Vienna, ISBN 3-85486-192-3
- 2005 SMS, Timzone 8, Beijing, ISBN 988-98086-2-5
- 2005 Stefan Banz (Hrsg.), Shadows Collide With People, Venice Biennale, Swiss Pavilion, Edition Fink, Zurich, ISBN 3-906086-79-8
- 2006 Laugh. I nearly died, Installations 1992–2006, Verlag für moderne Kunst, Nuremberg, ISBN 3-938821-29-9
- 2006 Bachmann/Banz, Ting Bu Dong, Paintings and Installations, Galerie Urs Meile, Beijing-Lucerne, ISBN 3-9523222-2-9; ISBN 978-3-9523222-2-2
- 2007 Bachmann/Banz, Helter Skelter – Painting With The Beatles, Galerie Urs Meile, Beijing-Lucerne
- 2009 Caroline Bachmann / Stefan Banz, What Duchamp Abandoned for the Waterfall, Scheidegger & Spiess, Zurich, ISBN 978-3-85881-261-2
- 2010 Stefan Banz, ed., Marcel Duchamp and the Forestay Waterfall, JRP|Ringier, Zurich. ISBN 978-3-03764-156-9
- 2011 Caroline Bachmann/Stefan Banz, Tenderness and Temperature, KMD – Kunsthalle Marcel Duchamp, Cully, Switzerland / Verlag für moderne Kunst Nuremberg, ISBN 978-3-86984-241-7
- 2011 Jean-Christophe Ammann, Das Wespennest ist eine Kathedrale, Ein Gespräch mit Stefan Banz, VKMD – Kunsthalle Marcel Duchamp, Cully, Switzerland / Verlag für moderne Kunst Nuremberg, German, ISBN 978-3-86984-240-0
- 2011 Friedrich Kittler, Platz der Luftbrücke. Ein Gespräch mit Stefan Banz (new revised and expanded edition), Kunsthalle Marcel Duchamp, Cully, Switzerland / Verlag für moderne Kunst, Nuremberg, German, ISBN 978-3-86984-294-3
- 2012 Stefan Banz, Marcel Duchamp: 1° La chute d’eau, KMD – Kunsthalle Marcel Duchamp, Cully, Switzerland / Verlag für moderne Kunst Nuremberg, English/German/French, ISBN 978-3-86984-328-5
- 2012 Stefan Banz, Aldo Walker: Logotyp. Mit Marcel Duchamp und William Copley im Hinterkopf, KMD – Kunsthalle Marcel Duchamp, Cully, Switzerland / Verlag für moderne Kunst Nuremberg, German, ISBN 978-3-86984-356-8
- 2013 Caroline Bachmann, Stefan Banz, Ralf Beil (eds.), La Broyeuse de chocolat: Kunsthalle Marcel Duchamp at Mathildenhöhe Darmstadt, KMD – Kunsthalle Marcel Duchamp, Cully, Switzerland / Verlag für moderne Kunst Nuremberg, English/German, ISBN 978-3-86984-416-9
- 2013 Stefan Banz, Marcel Duchamp: Pharmacie, KMD – Kunsthalle Marcel Duchamp, Cully, Switzerland / Verlag für moderne Kunst Nuremberg, ISBN 978-3-86984-465-7
- 2014 Caroline Bachmann/Stefan Banz, Das Schweigen der Junggesellen, Museum Schloss Moyland, Bedburg-Hau, Germany / Verlag für moderne Kunst Nuremberg, German, ISBN 978-3-86984-061-1
- 2014 Stefan Banz, Jeff Wall: With the Eye of the Mind, KMD – Kunsthalle Marcel Duchamp, Cully, Switzerland / Verlag für moderne Kunst Nuremberg, ISBN 978-3-86984-079-6
- 2015 Stefan Banz, Eilshemius: Peer of Poet-Painters, KMD – Kunsthalle Marcel Duchamp | The Forestay Museum of Art, Cully, Switzerland / JRP|Ringier Kunstverlag, Zurich, ISBN 978-3-03764-435-5
- 2016 Stefan Banz, Louis Michel Eilshemius und sein Einfluss auf Marcel Duchamp, KMD - Kunsthalle Marcel Duchamp | The Forestay Museum of Art / Verlag für Moderne Kunst, Vienna, ISBN 978-3-903131-12-5
