= Jan Muskata =

Polish bishop (1250–1320)

Jan Muskata (1250 – 7 February 1320) was bishop of Kraków from 1294 to 1309.

Muskata was born in Wrocław, Silesia. He was the son of a German spice trader. The name Muskata is derived from Latin, for nutmeg. He had brother named Stefan (fl. 1315).

He was educated in Bologna and became bishop in 1294. He supported Przemysł II of Poland, but after his assassination he joined the side of Venceslaus II of Bohemia. He served as his vice-chancellor in 1301 and also worked with his son.

When Władysław I the Elbow-high took hold of Kraków, the bishop was in strong opposition to Władysław, whom he excommunicated. In response Władysław had him imprisoned in 1308, which led the bishop to appeal to the Pope. The bishop was released in 1309. Under Wójt Albert and with Muskata's support, the Kraków burgher's revolted in 1311 against Władysław, but were suppressed. Bishop Muskata was declared "an enemy of the Polish People" by Jakub Świnka, Archbishop of Gniezno.

His successor as bishop of Kraków was bishop Nankier.

== Notes ==
Preceded by Prokop	Bishop of Kraków; 1294–1320	Succeeded by Nankier Kołda
