= Jan Romka =

Polish bishop

Sulima

Jan Romka was a thirteenth century Bishop of Wrocław. He was Bishop from 1292 to his death on 19 November 1301.

== Early life ==
The first mention of him is in 1267 as chaplain of the Bishop, Thomas Zaremba and in 1268 records state he was a Canon of Wrocław and had a master's degree, indicating a university education. He was a strong supporter of the bishop Tomasz Zaremba in his dispute with Henryk IV Probus and was involved in the siege by Tomasz in Racibórz in 1287.

== Role as Bishop ==
After the death of Tomasz Zaremba, Jan was elected Bishop of Wroclaw on 24 April 1292 and received Papal ascent. According to Jan Długosz, he was supported in the election by the Polish part of the chapter, against the German factions.

John continued the policy of Bishop Tomasz, trying to maintain and broaden the influence and economic privileges of the Bishops of Wroclaw. In this his task was easier than that of Thomas due to the death of Prince Henryk, despite however the intrigues of Henry’s successor Bulko I, Duke of Świdnica-jaworski.

John conducted peace negotiations between Bolesław Srogim, and Rudolf II and later (1299) supported Konrad II the Hunchback in his conflict with his brother Henry Głogowczykiem Duke of Głogów.

Bishop Jan collaborated with Archbishop of Gniezno Jakub Świnka, and according to Jan Długosz that took part in the coronations of Przemysł II (1295) and Wenceslaus II(1300) in Gniezno.

In the administration of the diocese, Jan cared for churches in the diocese, continued the reconstruction of the Cathedral of Wroclaw and oversaw the development of parish schools. He also convened at least one diocesan synod in 1296.

Religious titles
Preceded by Tomasz II	Bishop of Wrocław; 1292–1301	Succeeded by Henryk z Wierzbnej
