= Janusz Suchywilk =

Polish nobleman and bishop

His Excellency Janusz Suchywilk
- Archbishop of Gniezno
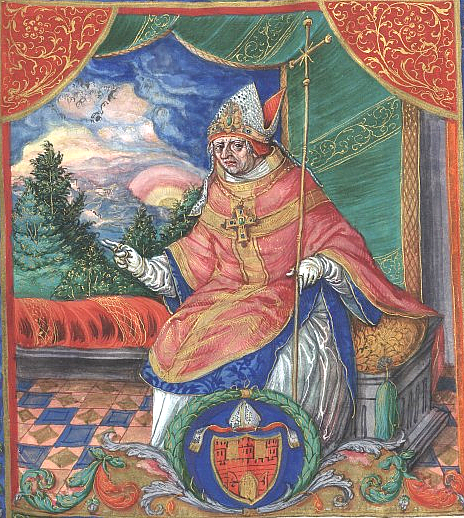
- Church: Roman Catholic
- Archdiocese: Gniezno
- Installed: 1374
- Term ended: 1382
- Predecessor: Jarosław Bogoria
- Successor: Bodzanta

Personal details
- Born: 1310
- Died: 5 April 1382 (aged 71–72)
- Coat of arms

Janusz Suchywilk of Grzymala Coat of Arms (c. 1310 – 5 April 1382) was a Polish nobleman (szlachcic), relative of Jarosław z Bogorii i Skotnik.

Janusz became Chancellor of the Polish Kingdom and Archbishop of Gniezno in 1374. From 1357 until 1373 he served as Chancellor of Kraków. He was an outstanding lawyer. He is considered as the co-author of King Casimir III of Poland's statutes. An advocate of Kazko IV Prince of Słupsk for the Polish throne after the death of King Kazimierz. He was the leader of the opposition to King Louis the Great.

Preceded by Zbigniew z Szczyrzyca	Grand Chancellor of the Crown; 1374–?	Succeeded by Zawisza z Kurozwek
Catholic Church titles
Preceded by Jarosław z Bogorii i Skotnik	Archbishop of Gniezno; 1374–1382	Succeeded by Bodzęta z Kosowic
