= Stanisława of Bogoria and Skotnik =

Polish noblewoman (died 1352)

Coat of arms Bogoria

Stanisława of Bogoria and Skotnik (Polish: Stanisława z Bogorii i Skotnik; died c. March 27, 1352) was a Polish noblewoman and member of the Bogoriowie family of the Bogorya coat of arms.

Stanisława was the daughter of Paweł of Bogoria and Skotnik. She married Spytek of Melsztyn about 1315.

Children:

- Czuchna of Tarnów
- Nieustąp of Tarnów
- Rafał of Tarnów
