= Střížovice (Jindřichův Hradec District) =

- Municipality
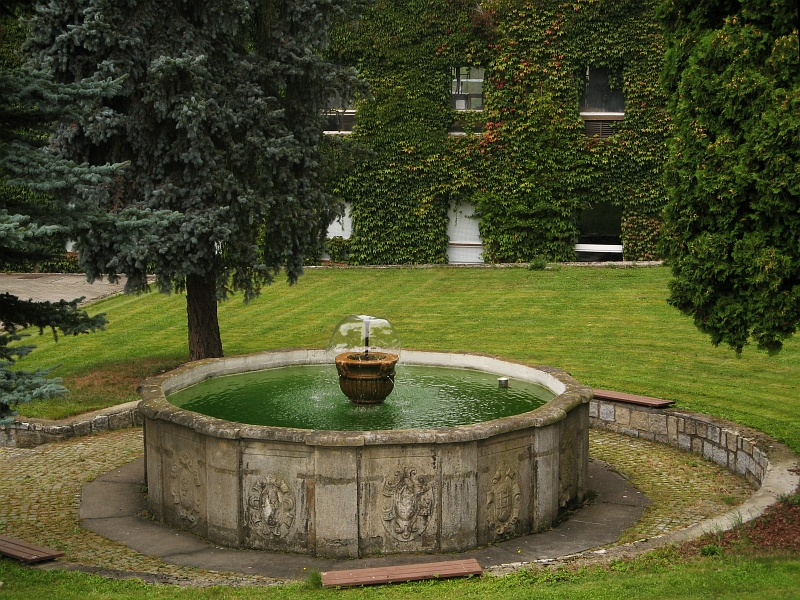
- Stone fountain

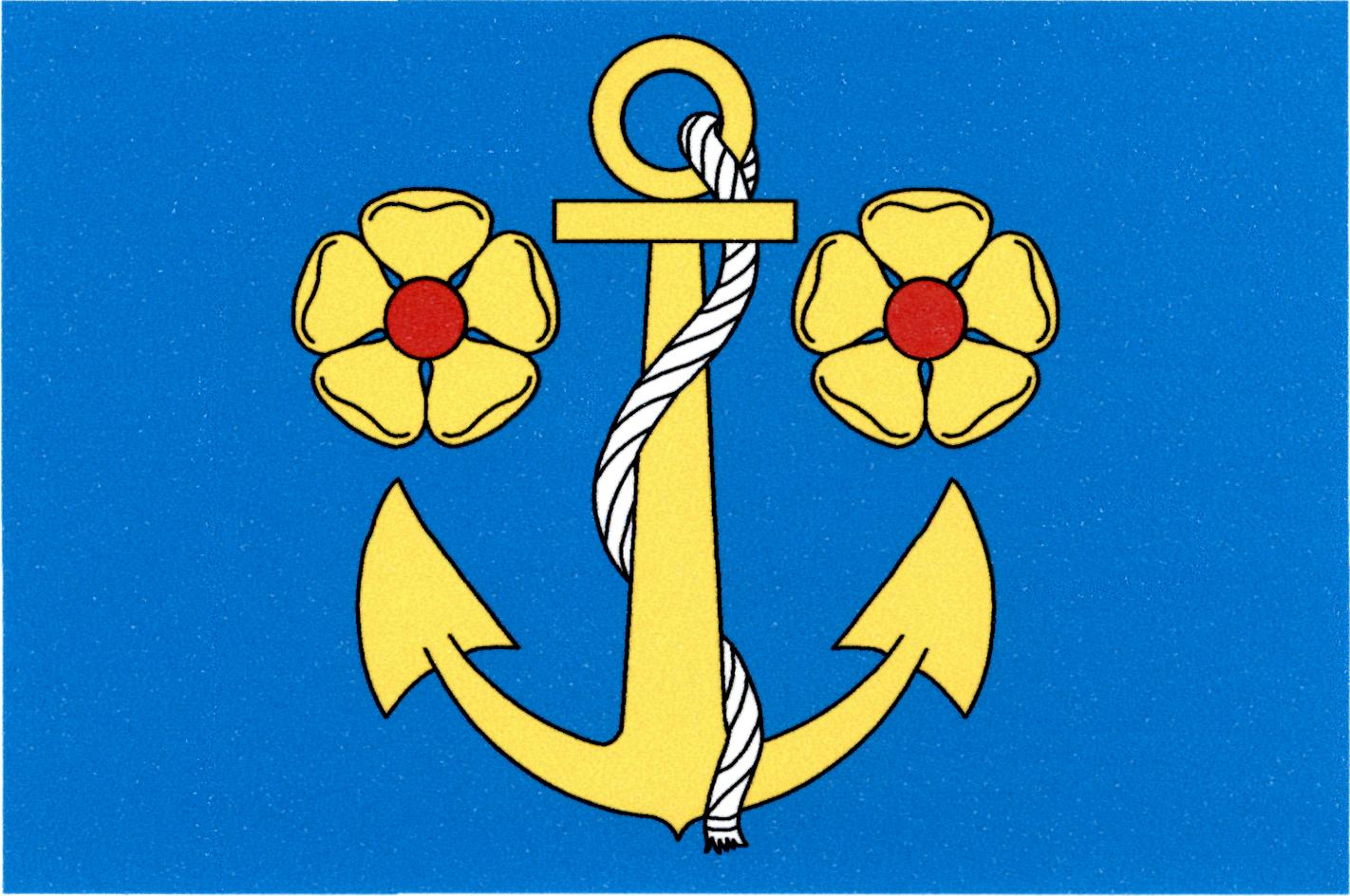
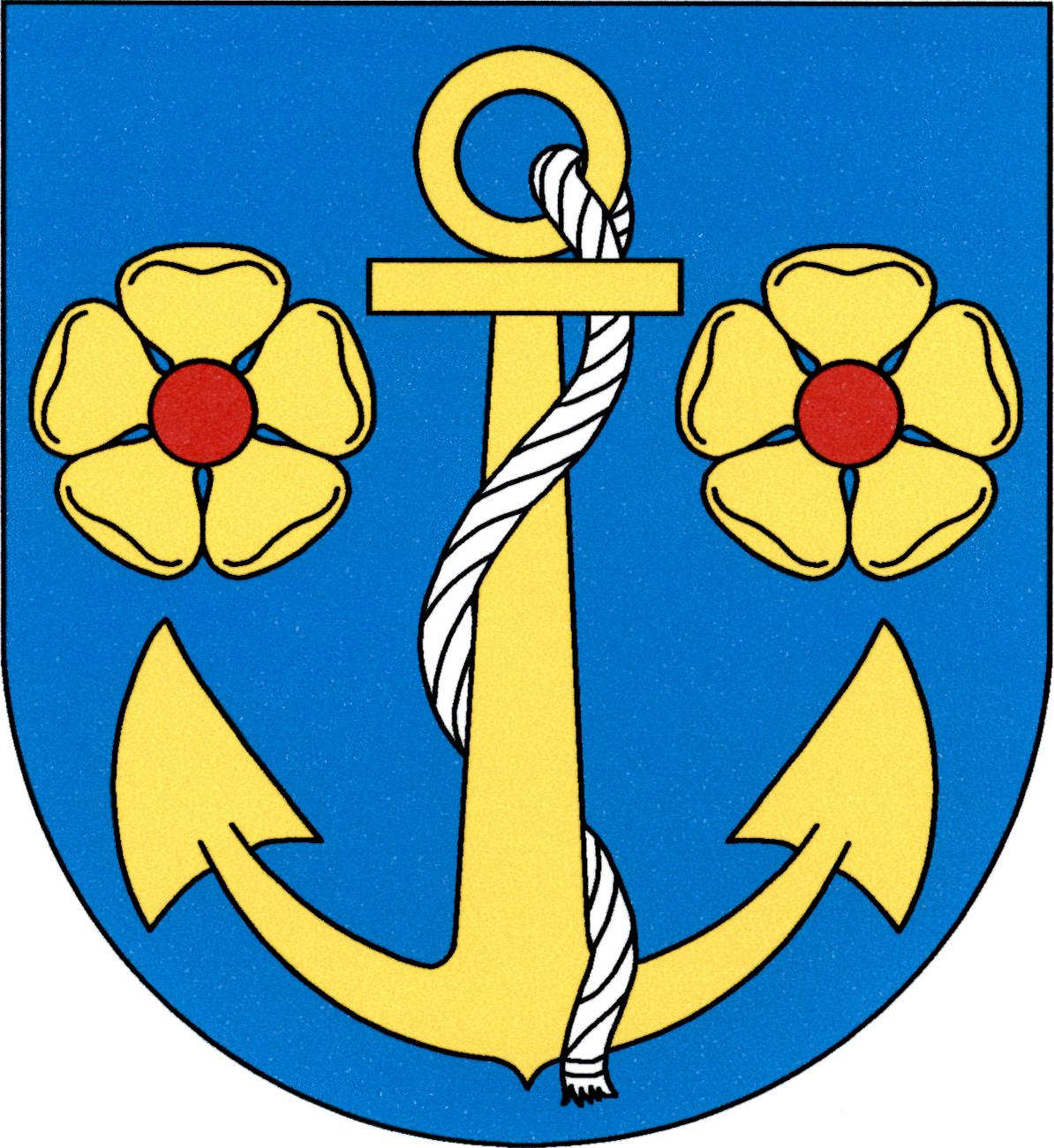
- Flag Coat of arms

- Location in the Czech Republic
- Coordinates: 49°8′24″N 15°9′25″E
- Country: Czech Republic
- Region: South Bohemian
- District: Jindřichův Hradec
- First mentioned: 1381

Area
  - Total: 12.36 km^{2} (4.77 sq mi)
- Elevation: 532 m (1,745 ft)

Population (2026-01-01)
  - Total: 565
  - Density: 45.7/km^{2} (118/sq mi)
- Time zone: UTC+1 (CET)
  - Summer (DST): UTC+2 (CEST)
- Postal code: 378 62
- Website: www.strizovice.cz

Střížovice is a municipality and village in Jindřichův Hradec District in the South Bohemian Region of the Czech Republic. It has about 600 inhabitants.

Střížovice lies approximately 12 kilometres (7 mi) east of Jindřichův Hradec, 54 km (34 mi) east of České Budějovice, and 118 km (73 mi) south-east of Prague.

== Administrative division ==
Střížovice consists of three municipal parts (in brackets population according to the 2021 census):

- Střížovice (150)
- Budkov (14)
- Vlčice (376)

== Demographics ==
Historical population
Year	Pop.	±%
1869	773	—
1880	802	+3.8%
1890	772	−3.7%
1900	777	+0.6%
1910	751	−3.3%
1921	655	−12.8%
1930	569	−13.1%
1950	474	−16.7%
1961	483	+1.9%
1970	413	−14.5%
1980	546	+32.2%
1991	654	+19.8%
2001	650	−0.6%
2011	559	−14.0%
2021	540	−3.4%
Source: Censuses
