= Tomasz I =

Tomasz I (d. 1268) was a Bishop of Wrocław, Poland in the thirteenth century. He was in office from 1232 until he died on 30 May 1268. He is considered one of the most significant bishops of Wrocław diocese and is known for his role in the Germanification of Silesia, building programs, and promoting church interests in secular politics.

He promoted the process of German colonization in Silesia that resulted in Wrocław being known by the German name Breslau and establishing a demographic feature that was of major significance in World War II. His defence of the rights of the Church took him into bitter conflicts with Bolesław II the Horned, Duke of Legnica, with Tomasz I being kidnapped at one time by the duke. He also had a dispute with Duke Henry over taxes, however, he had a favourable ally and was supported by Konrad I, Duke of Głogów. He began the construction of the Gothic-style Wrocław Cathedral, with the chancel being erected in 1244. He made endowments to monasteries, and founded the village of Łuczyna in 1251. He was Bishop during the Mongol invasion of Poland when marauding Mongols made incursions (1241) in the area. He is said by some to be a descendant of the Rawicz family.St. Hedwig died during his episcopate and he assisted in the process of canonization. Ladislaus, a grandson of Saint Hedwig, and Archbishop of Salzburg, was Administrator of the Diocese of Wrocław between the death of Tomasz and the accession of Thomasz's nephew and canon, Tomasz II.

Religious titles
Preceded by Lorenz	Bishop of Wrocław; 1232–1268	Succeeded by Tomasz II
