= Tomasz II, bishop of Wrocław =

13th-century Polish religious servant

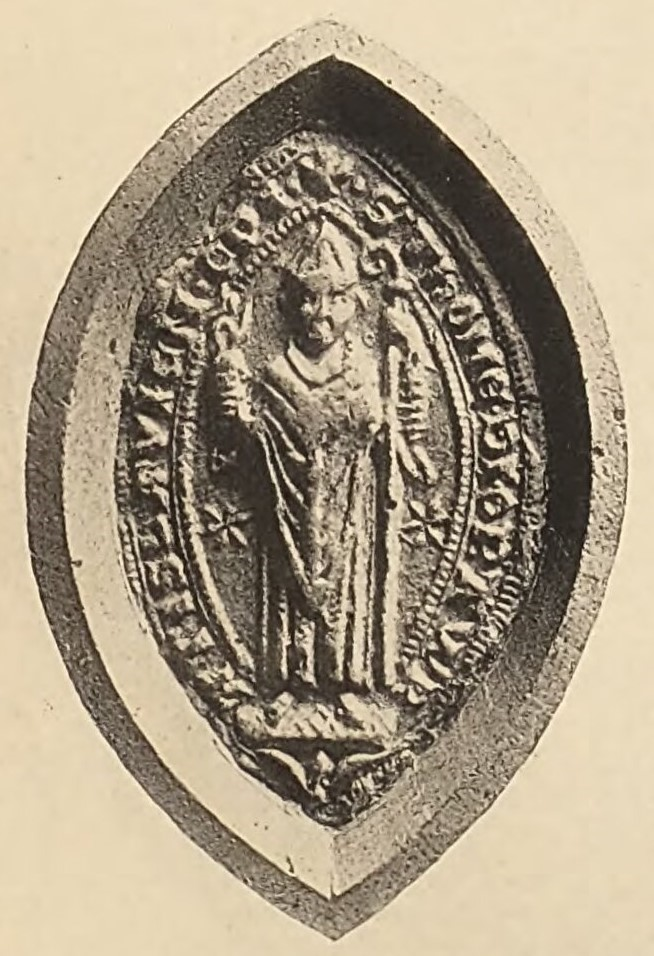

- Coat of arms
- Tenure: Roman Catholic Bishop of Wrocław (1270–), bishop
- Predecessor: Roman Catholic Bishop of Wrocław (Tomasz I), bishop
- Successor: Roman Catholic Bishop of Wrocław (Jan Romka), bishop
- Years active: 1270
- Died: 15 March 1292; Brno
- Occupation: Bishops in the Catholic Church, bishop

Tomasz II Zaremba was a medieval bishop of Wrocław, Poland from 1270 until 1292.

Tomasz Zaremba was a nephew and confidant of his predecessor, Tomasz I. Prior to being Bishop he had been a canon in Wrocław and Archdeacon of Opole.

As a bishop, he advocated extensively on behalf of the church in the political sphere. Notably, Thomas was involved for years in a violent dispute with Duke Henry IV as to the prerogatives of the Church in Silesia, and was forced to leave Wrocław in 1285 and seek refuge with Prince Mieszko in Raciborz.

In 1287 a reconciliation was effected between them at Regensburg, and in 1288 the duke founded the collegiate Church of the Holy Cross at Wrocław as part of the reconciliation. Before his death, on the Eve of St. John in 1290, the duke confirmed the rights of the Church to sovereignty over the territories of Neisse and Otmuchów making Thomas the first Prince-Bishop in Wrocław.

Other achievements of Thomas II include the consecration of the high altar of the cathedral, attendance at the First Council of Lyon (1274), holding a diocesan synod in 1279 and the establishment of the St. Thomas Collegiate Church in Racibórz.

Religious titles
Preceded by Thomas I	Bishop of Wrocław; 1270–1292	Succeeded by Johann III Romka
