= Janisław (archbishop of Gniezno) =

His Excellency Janisław
- Archbishop of Gniezno
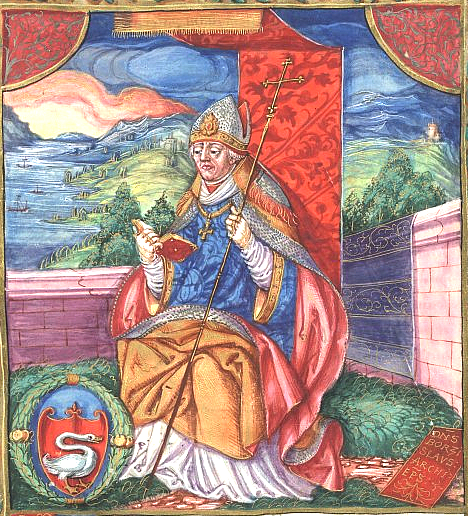
- Church: Roman Catholic
- Archdiocese: Gniezno
- Installed: 1317
- Term ended: 1341
- Predecessor: Borzysław I
- Successor: Jarosław Bogoria

Personal details
- Born: unknown
- Died: 1341
- Coat of arms

Janisław (unknown—4 December 1341, Łęczyca) was an Archbishop of Gniezno 1317–41, having in 1317 succeeded Borzysław I. Janisław unconditionally supported the policy of reunification of Polish lands carried out by Władysław I the Elbow-high, whom he crowned King of Poland on 20 January 1320.

In 1320-21 Janisław was one of the judges named by the Pope in the lawsuit of Inowrocław opposing the Teutonic Knights on the question of Gdańsk. On 25 April 1333 Janisław was crowned Casimir III of Poland, son and successor of Władysław I. In Warsaw (1339), the new lawsuit granted Poland Gdańsk against the Teutonic Knights, stating the principle that the King of Poland must rule Gdańsk on the grounds it had previously been Polish.
