= Fernando de Palacios =

Fernando Martínez de Palacios was an Andalusian prelate who served as the bishop of Lugo (1418–1434) and as a papal legate to the kingdoms of Bohemia and Hungary (1418–1421).

Fernando was born in Jaén and studied at the University of Bologna. He served as a papal referendary in Rome, as the dean of the diocese of Segovia and as an oidor of the royal council of King Ferdinand I of Aragon (r. 1412–1416). Fernando became bishop of Lugo after the death of Bishop Juan Enríquez in November 1418. He excommunicated the nuns of Santa Clara de Toledo over the property of his predecessor, causing the nuns to appeal to the pope. He was mostly an absentee bishop, however, who rarely visited his diocese. In 1419, he appointed Juan Ruiz de Baeza, a fellow Andalusian, as his vicar to administer it in his absence.

In 1418, Pope Martin V sent Fernando with Cardinal Giovanni Dominici as papal nuncios to the court of King Sigismund of Hungary in Buda with legatine authority to organize the Hussite Crusade. In February 1419, Fernando was in Prague trying to root out what he identified as heresy. Exiles from this period may have founded the Taborite movement. According the Chronicle of Laurence of Březová, Fernando forbade communion under both kinds, destroyed the host that had been blessed by Hussite priests and even had one priest burned to death at Slaný.

When Dominici died in June 1419, Fernando took over the general direction of the crusade, which he proclaimed formally in Wrocław on 17 March 1420, in accordance with the papal bull Omnium plasmatoris domini. In 1421, Cardinal Branda da Castiglione took over as legate but Fernando continued to be involved. One Hussite manifesto attacks Fernando as "not a legate of Christ, who is the author of peace and salvation, rather a nuncio of Antichrist," a man of war, oppression and injustice. Fernando's own response to the Hussites' Four Articles of Prague from July 1420 has been published by František Palacký.

== Sources ==
- Cendón Fernández, Marta (1997). "Un Obispo de Lugo en Santa Clara de Toledo: el sepulcro de Fray Juan Enríquez". Archivo español de arte. 70 (279): 302–310.
- Fudge, Thomas A., ed. (2020). Origins of the Hussite Uprising: The Chronicle of Laurence of Březová (1414–1421). Routledge.
- González Sánchez, Santiago (2017). Algunos problemas y retos de la Iglesia castellana en los comienzos del siglo xv (1406–1420). Dykinson.
- Kalous, Antonín (2016). "Papal Legates and Crusading Activity in Central Europe: The Hussites and the Ottoman Turks". The Crusade in the Fifteenth Century. Routledge. pp. 75–89.
- Palacký, František, ed. (1966) [1872]. Urkundliche Beiträge zur Geschichte des Hussitenkrieges. Vol. 1. Biblio-Verlag.
- Varela Barreiro, Francisco Xabier; Pichel Gotérrez, Ricardo (2016). "Galego-portugués e castelán na Galiza do século XV: retrincos significativos na documentación xudicial da colección da catedral de Lugo". In Ramón Mariño Paz; Francisco Xabier Varela Barreiro (eds.). A lingua galega no solpor medieval. pp. 97–120.
