= Nanker =

Polish Noble, Bishop of Kraków, and Bishop of Wrocław

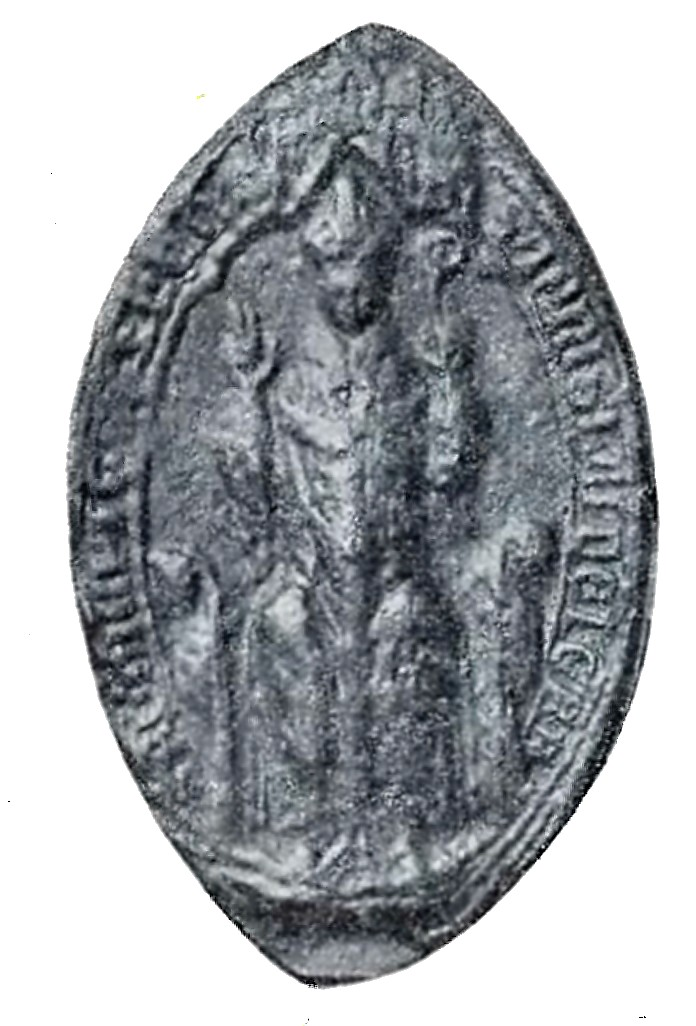
Seal of Nanker with his likeness, 14th century

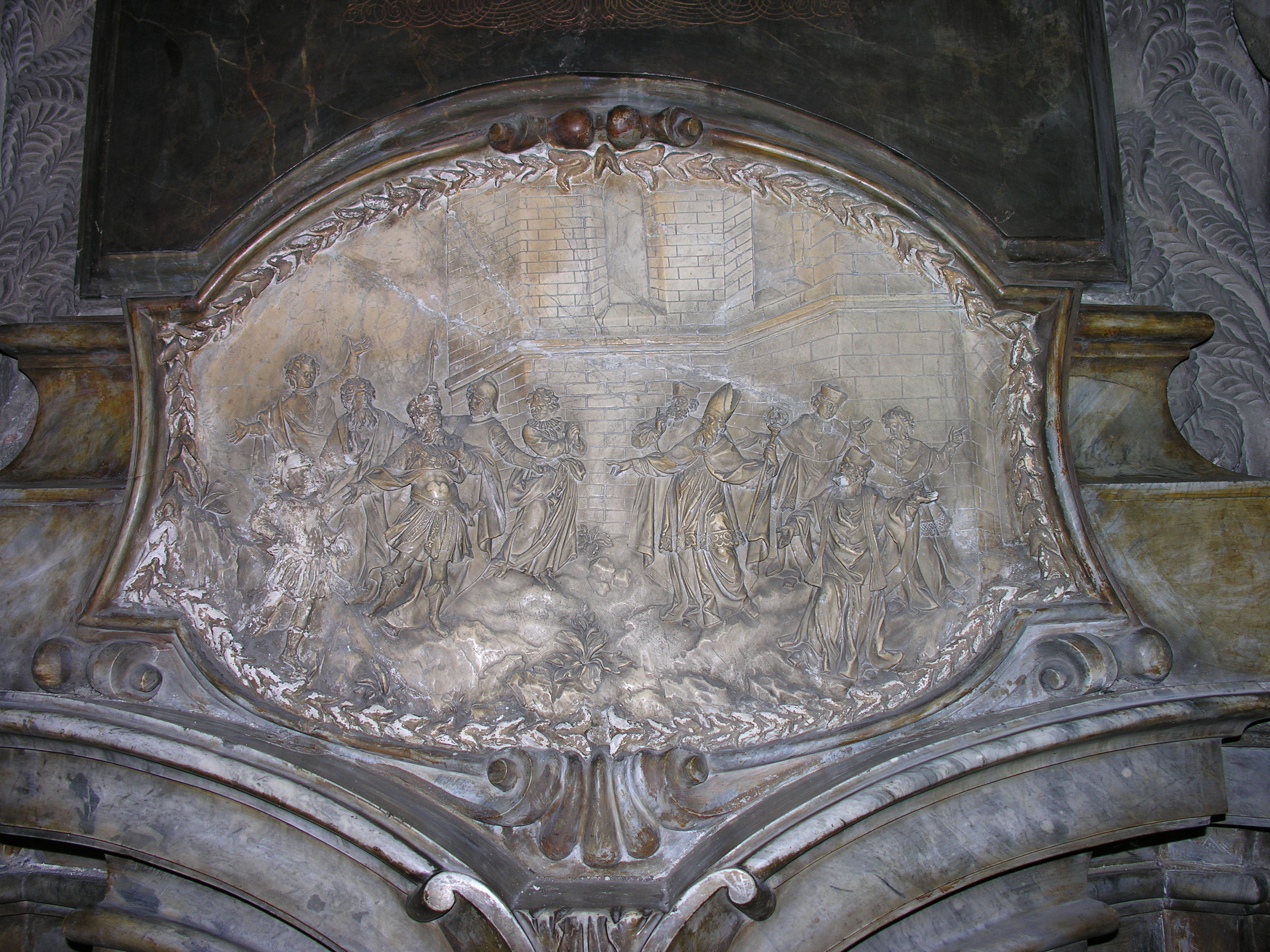
The excommunication of John of Bohemia by Nanker. Bas-relief in the Cathedral of Wroclaw

Nanker (born Jan Kołda; also known as Nankier; ca. 1270–1341) was a Polish nobleman of Oksza coat of arms as well as bishop of Kraków (1320–1326) and bishop of Wrocław (1326–1341).

Supporter of King Ladislaus I the Short and archbishop and primate of Poland Jakub Świnka, he initiated the construction of the Wawel Cathedral. In 1337 he excommunicated John of Bohemia.

== Biography ==
Jan Kołda was born in around 1270 in Kamień, a Polish garrison at Rozbark silver mines at the eastern border of the Duchy of Bytom.

In 1304 he was Archdeacon of Sandomierz From 1305-1307 studied, Canon law at the University in Bologna, Italy which was a centre of legal scholarship. In 1318 he returned to Poland and was appointed by the Chancellor of St. Mary's Church, and Dean of the chapter of Kraków. As Bishop of Krakow he set out the diocesan statutes, and initiated the construction of the Gothic Cathedral on the Wawel Hill. In 1337 he excommunicated King John of Luxembourg and became an ardent supporter of Papal policy.

He died on April 8, 1341, in Nysa and was buried in the Cathedral of John the Baptist in Wrocław.

In 1952, the beatification process for Nanker was resumed and he is well known in Polish popular culture thanks to the movie "Casimir the Great" in which his role was played by Tadeusz Fijewski.

Preceded by Jan Muskata	Bishop of Kraków; 1320–1326	Succeeded by Jan Grot
Preceded by Nikolaus of Banz (administrator)	Bishop of Wrocław; 1326–1341	Succeeded by Przecław of Pogorzela
