= Sobów, Tarnobrzeg =

District of Tarnobrzeg

Coordinates: 50°35′56″N 21°44′25″E

Sobów
- Osiedle
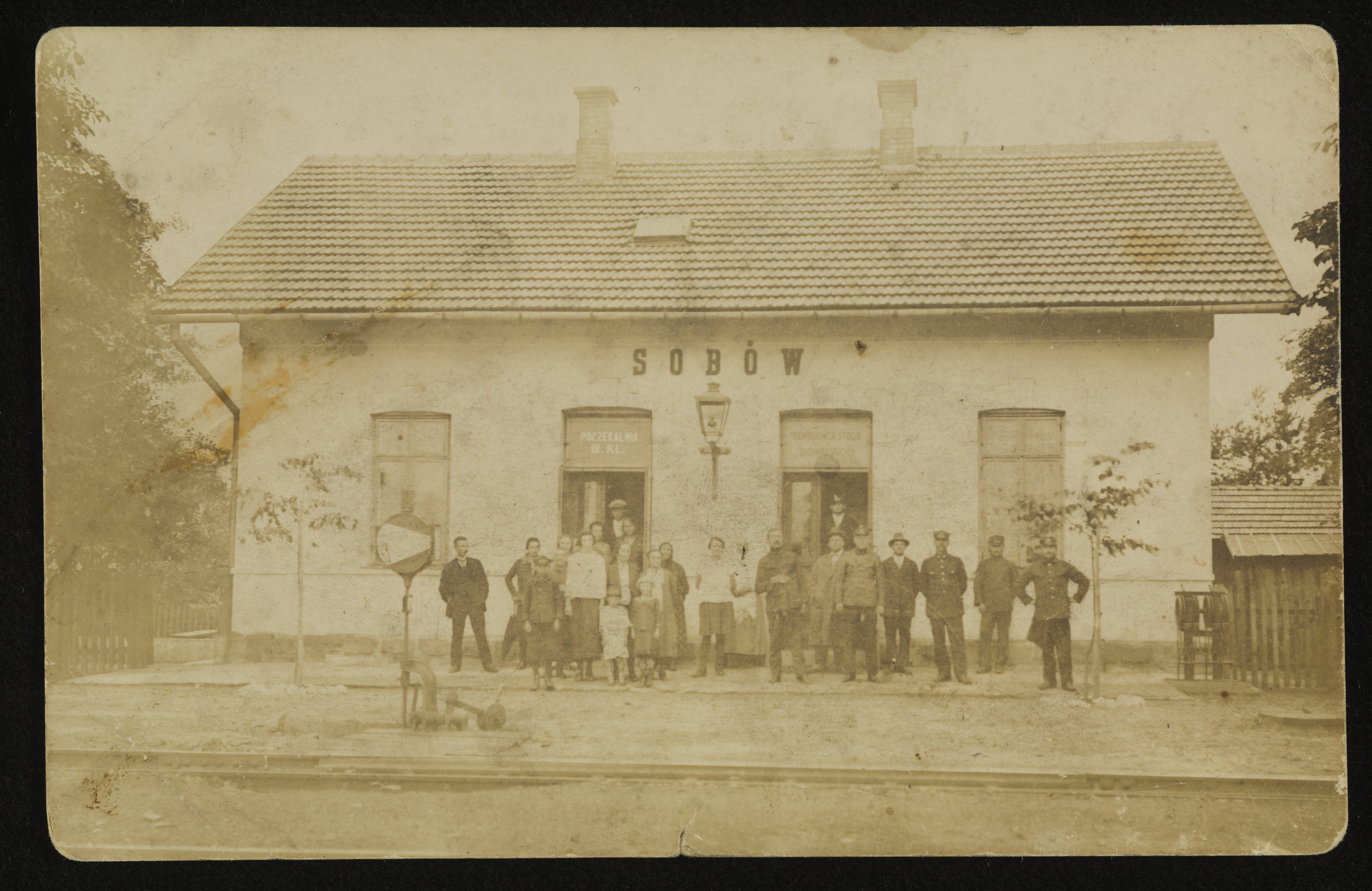
- A postcard showing railway workers in front of the village's station building, c. 1905. From the collections of the National Library of Poland
- Interactive map of Sobów
- Country: Poland
- Voivodeship: Podkarpackie
- Region: Sandomierz Basin
- City: Tarnobrzeg
- Established: 1887
- Incorporated: 1 July 1990

Government
  - Type: Zarząd
  - Body: Osiedla Sobów
  - Chairman: Waldemar Szwedo
- Postal code: 39-441
- SIMC: 0980257
- Vehicle registration: RT

Sobów is a former village in Podkarpackie Voivodeship, Poland, and home to a rail station called Sobów, established in 1887. Now part of Tarnobrzeg, it is located in northern part of the town bordering Wielowieś, Mokrzyszów, Sielec, and Zakrzów.

== Notable people ==
The political and social activists Tomasz Dąbal and Franciszek Dąbal were born in Sobów.
