= Miechocin =

District of Tarnobrzeg

Coordinates: 50°33′13″N 21°39′33″E

- Osiedle
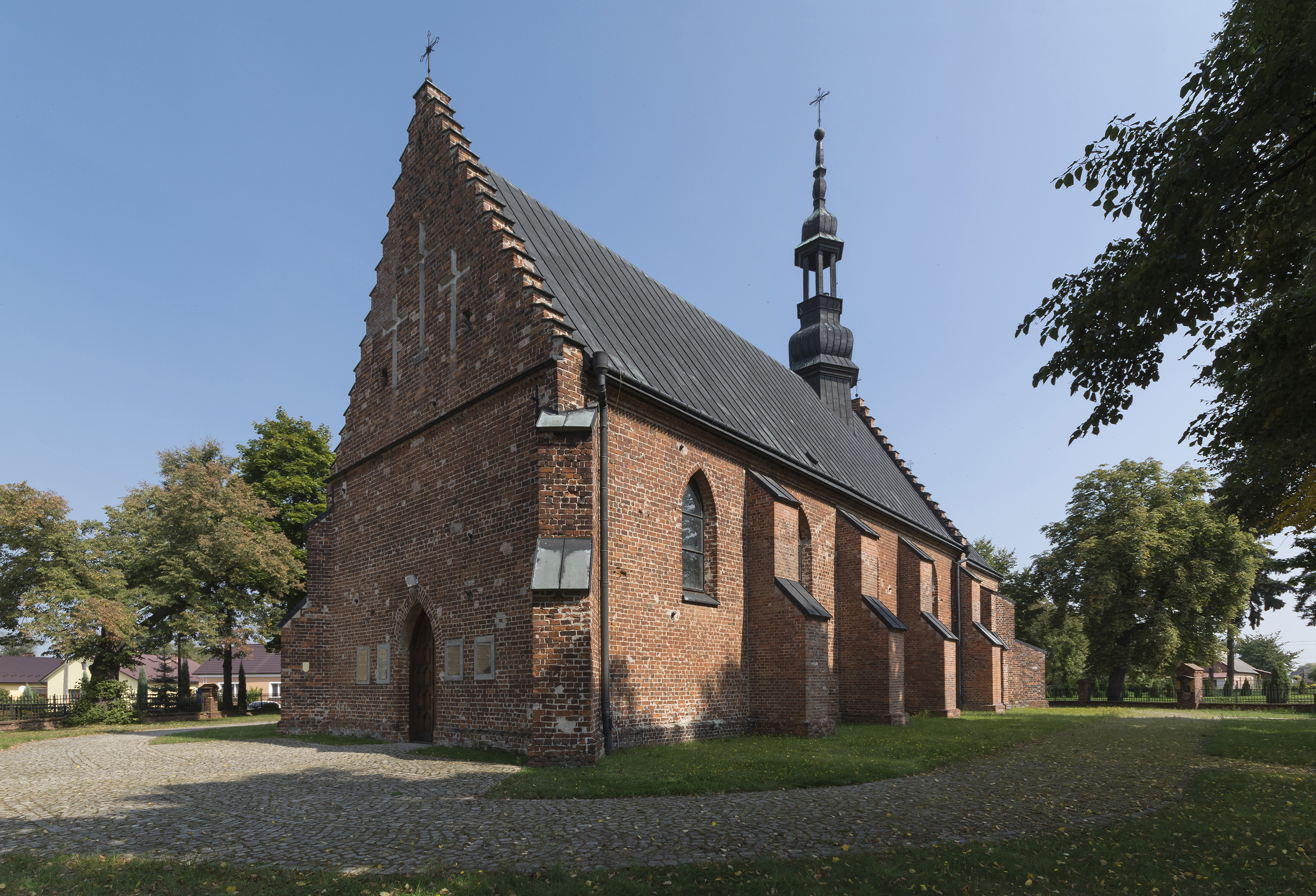
- The Church of St. Mary Magdalene in Miechocin
- Interactive map of Miechocin
- Country: Poland
- Voivodeship: Podkarpackie
- Region: Sandomierz Basin
- City: Tarnobrzeg
- Incorporated: 1 October 1976

Government
  - Type: Zarząd
  - Body: Osiedla Miechocin
  - Chairman: Antoni Sikoń
- SIMC: 0980174
- Vehicle registration: RT

Miechocin (Latin: Miechovia) is an osiedle of Tarnobrzeg in Subcarpathia, and the oldest part of the modern town.

== History ==
Its first settlement dates around 1000 AD, while the first documented mention of Miechocin comes from 1185, when the wooden church of Mary Magdalene parish church was established here. The original wooden church was replaced with a brick one in 1340. In 1613, the church was expanded and remodelled in Baroque style. Until 1922, the church at Miechocin was the seat of a large parish, which also covered the area from Wielowies to Kolbuszowa, together with Tarnobrzeg. In the 16th century, a parish school with a library was opened here, which became widely known as the Miechocin Academy. The village was famous for its potmakers, whose products were sold as far as Gdańsk, Elbląg and Toruń.
