= Church of St. Mary Magdalene, Tarnobrzeg =

Church building in Tarnobrzeg, Poland

Coordinates: 50°33′26″N 21°39′47″E

Church of Saint Mary Magdalene in Tarnobrzeg
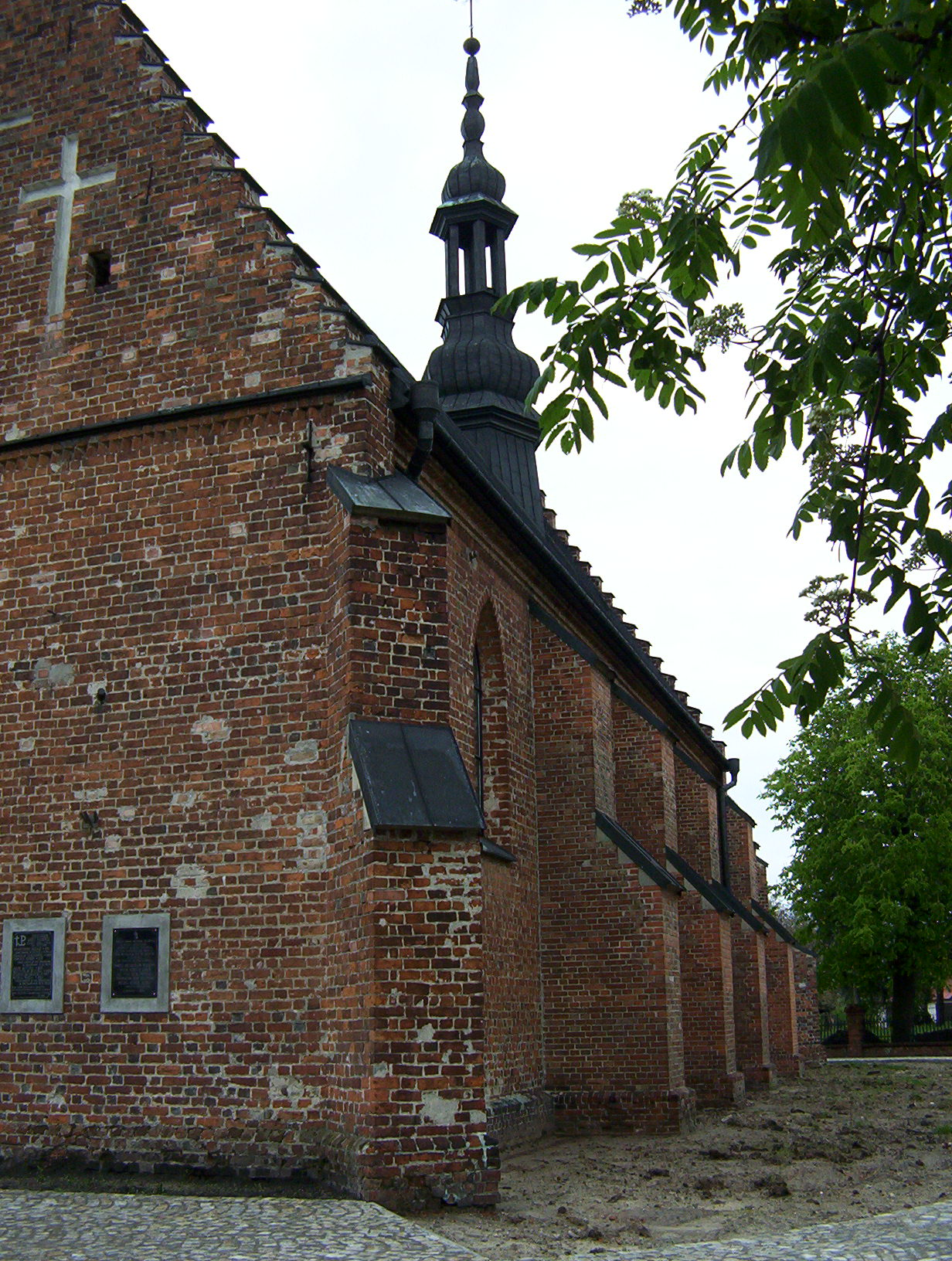
- View from the back

Religion
- Affiliation: Roman Catholic
- Province: Subcarpathian Voivodeship / Roman Catholic Diocese of Sandomierz
- Region: Tarnobrzeg
- Rite: Latin
- Status: main church of parish of Mary Magdalene

Location
- State: Poland
- Interactive map of Church of Saint Mary Magdalene in Tarnobrzeg

Architecture
- Type: gothic
- Completed: around 1160

Church of Saint Mary Magdalene in Tarnobrzeg - Miechocin is the oldest church in Tarnobrzeg, and one of the oldest brick churches in Poland. Named after Jesus' companion Mary Magdalene, it was made in gothic style, but it was on several occasions rebuilt in different styles.

== See also ==
- Dzików Castle
- Tarnobrzeg's churches: Assumption of Mary, Our Lady of Perpetual Help
