= Dzików Confederation =

18th century military confederation of Polish nobles

The Dzikowska Confederation (Polish: konfederacja dzikowska) was a military organisation formed in 1734 in Dzików (today suburb of Tarnobrzeg) by supporters of Stanisław I during the War of the Polish Succession, under the leadership of Adam Tarło as Marshal, and Grand Hetman of the Crown Józef Potocki as commander of the army until 28 February 1735 when he was relieved of command.

The watchword of the confederation was: "Fight against Saxony and Russia for political independence of the Polish–Lithuanian Commonwealth and carry out political reforms." They attempted unsuccessfully to gain Czech and Hungarian support, as well as from Silesian citizens. They also dispatched envoys to Sweden, France, the Ottoman Empire, and the Vatican.

The confederation was defeated, with the last armed struggles taking place in 1736 near Kurpie and Podolia.

== See also ==
- Dzików Castle
