= Franciszek Dąbal =

Polish politician, activist of the peasants' movement

- Born: Franciszek Tomasz Dąbal; 23 March 1920; Sobów, Lwów Voivodeship, Second Polish Republic
- Died: 22 June 1989 (aged 69); Rzeszów, Rzeszów Voivodeship, Polish People's Republic
- Occupations: Activist and politician
- Relatives: Tomasz Dąbal (brother)

Franciszek Tomasz Dąbal (23 March 1920 – 22 June 1989) was a Polish politician, activist of the peasants' movement, member of the Sejm of the People's Republic of Poland of the 4th, 5th, 6th, 7th, 8th and 9th term. In the years 1969–1973 chairman of the presidium of the Provincial National Council of the Rzeszów Voivodeship (with the powers of the Rzeszów Voivode).

He is buried at the Wilkowyja Cemetery in Rzeszów.
