= Tarnobrzeg =

- City county
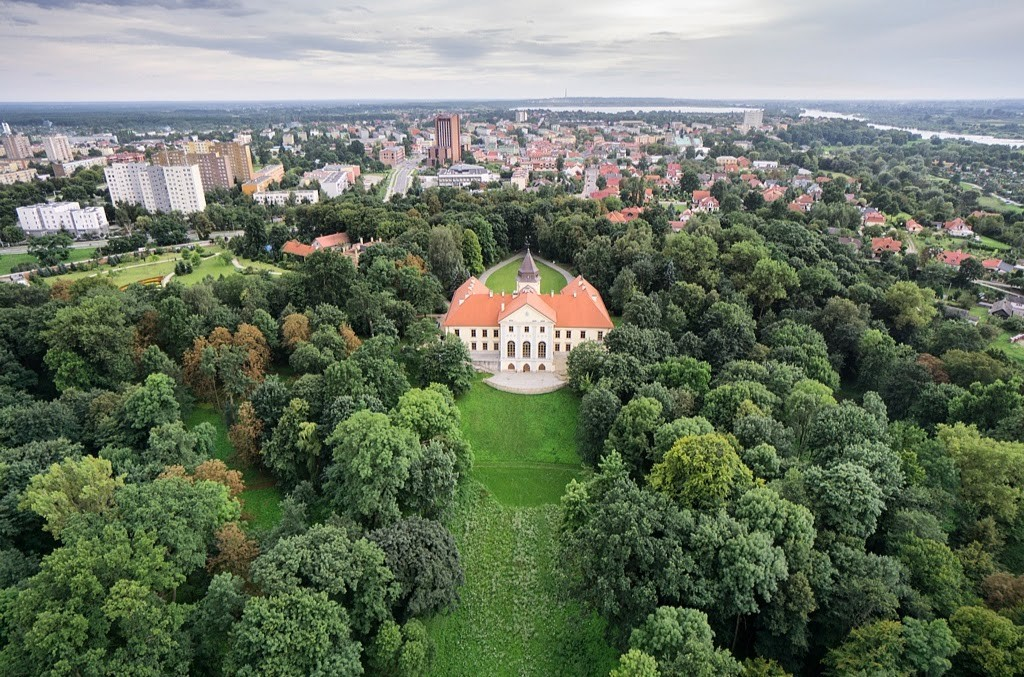
- Skyline with Dzików Castle, city center, river Vistula and Reservoir Machów created in a former sulfur mine

- Flag Coat of arms
- Interactive map of Tarnobrzeg
- Location within Poland
- Coordinates: 50°35′N 21°41′E
- Country: Poland
- Voivodeship: Subcarpathian
- County: city county
- City rights: 1593

Government
  - President: Łukasz Nowak

Area
  - Total: 85.6 km^{2} (33.1 sq mi)
- Elevation: 160 m (520 ft)

Population (2017)
  - Total: 47,387
  - Density: 554/km^{2} (1,430/sq mi)
- Time zone: UTC+1 (CET)
  - Summer (DST): UTC+2 (CEST)
- Postal code: 39-400
- Area code: +48 015
- Car plates: RT
- Website: http://www.tarnobrzeg.pl/

Tarnobrzeg [tarˈnɔbʐɛk] is a city in south-eastern Poland (historic Lesser Poland), on the east bank of the river Vistula, with 49,419 inhabitants, as of 31 December 2009. Situated in the Subcarpathian Voivodeship (Polish: Województwo podkarpackie) since 1999, it had previously been the capital of Tarnobrzeg Voivodeship (1975–1998). Tarnobrzeg lies in the Sandomierz Basin, and directly borders the town of Sandomierz, Świętokrzyskie Voivodeship. Its history dates back to the year 1593, when it was granted Magdeburg rights, and belonged to the Tarnowski family. For centuries Tarnobrzeg remained a small town, which did not develop until the post-World War II period, when it became center of an industrial area, based on rich sulfur deposits.

== Etymology ==
The name Tarnobrzeg refers to the founders of the town, the Tarnowski family. Other names were suggested, such as "Tarnodwor", "Nowo Dwor", and "Nowy Tarnów". Finally, Tarnobrzeg prevailed, and other towns, founded by the Tarnowski family, were also named in a similar fashion, such as Tarnogród and Tarnopol.

Until the 20th century, however, the name Tarnobrzeg was not popular among residents. In common use were such names, as Dzików (see also Dzików Castle) and Miechocin, as these two locations were older, larger and more important. After opening of a rail station called Tarnobrzeg (1887), and creation of the Tarnobrzeg County (1920), the name caught on and became commonly used. Nevertheless, patron saint of the region, is still called Our Lady of Dzików (see also Dominican Church and Convent of Assumption of Mary in Tarnobrzeg).

== Location and area ==
Tarnobrzeg lies along National Road 9, which is part of the European route E371. The town also is a railroad hub, with five stations located within its limits (Ocice, Sobow, Tarnobrzeg, Tarnobrzeg Waskotorowy and Wielowieś). Rail lines stem from Tarnobrzeg into four directions: southwards towards Dębica, southeast towards Rzeszów, east towards Stalowa Wola, and northwards, towards Sandomierz.

Currently Tarnobrzeg is one of the largest towns of Poland in terms of territory. It covers the area of 85 square kilometres (33 sq mi), and the distance between its extreme northern and southern locations reaches 20 kilometres (12 miles). This is because, in 1975, Tarnobrzeg unexpectedly became the capital of a newly created province, Tarnobrzeg Voivodeship. To expand the town, local authorities initiated a policy of annexation of local villages. As a result, in the late 1970s, the size of the town quickly grew, when several villages and settlements (Machow, Dzików, Miechocin, Wielowieś, Sielec, Podleze, Sobow, Mokrzyszow) became part of Tarnobrzeg as its districts. The Old Town and historic center of Tarnobrzeg covers a very small area of the town, as 80% of Tarnobrzeg was built after the war.

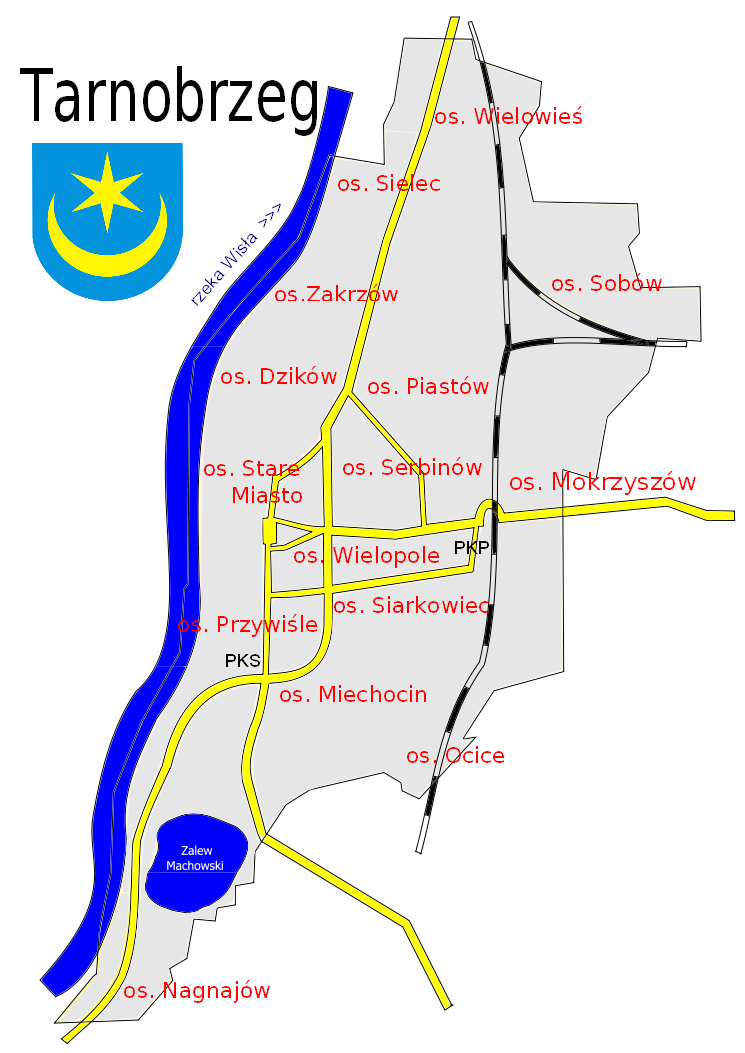
Boroughs, districts and osiedla of Tarnobrzeg

=== Administrative divisions of Tarnobrzeg ===
Boroughs, districts and osiedla of Tarnobrzeg include: Wielowieś, Sielec, Chwałki, Borów, Wymysłów, Zakrzów, Zwierzyniec, Dzików, Podłęże, Serbinów, Nadole, Old Town, Wielopole, Biała Góra, Podchoiny, Chomki, Siarkowiec, Skalna Góra, Przywiśle, Mokrzyszów, Piastów, Sobów, Chałupki, Miechocin, Ocice, Kozielec, Kajmów, Machów, Nagnajów.

== History ==
Tarnobrzeg was founded in 1593, during the golden age of Poland, to become the residence of the Tarnowski family (see szlachta). In that year, King Sigismund III Vasa granted Magdeburg rights to the village (May 28, 1593). The founder of the town was Stanislaw Tarnowski, Castellan of Sandomierz. In 1772, it became part of the Austrian Empire and remained in the province of Galicia until November 1918. Tarnobrzeg, located very close to the Russian-Austrian border, sustained heavy damage during World War I by invading armies.

In the aftermath of World War I, the short-lived Republic of Tarnobrzeg was declared here, and in 1919, the town became part of Lwów Voivodeship of the newly independent Second Polish Republic. The city suffered significant emigration within the former Austrian empire and elsewhere during the interbellum years (1919–1939). A public school system was founded during that time.

In the 1950s, after geological research into fuel deposits, significant sulfur resources were discovered. From the early 1960s the city grew rapidly: the population rose from 5,000 to 50,000 in 1990s. After closing the sulfur mine "Siarkopol" in Machów and Jeziórko a stagnation of Tarnobrzeg followed. In 1999 it ceased being a Voivodeship capital and became a city-county (powiat grodzki).

Timeline of Tarnobrzeg history (note: the history of Tarnobrzeg itself is not very long. Much older are several districts of the contemporary town, such as Wielowieś in its north, and Miechocin in the south).

- Till 1772 Poland during the Piast dynasty, Poland during the Jagiellon dynasty, Polish–Lithuanian Commonwealth: Sandomierz Voivodeship
- 1772 – 1918 Austrian Empire and Austria-Hungary: Kingdom of Galicia and Lodomeria
- 1918 – 1919 Republic of Tarnobrzeg
- 1919 – 1939 Second Polish Republic: Lwów Voivodeship
- 1939 – 1944 Nazi Germany: General Government (Distrikt Krakau, Dębica Land)
- 1944 – 1975 Polish People's Republic: Rzeszów Voivodeship
- 1975 – 1998 Polish People's Republic, Third Polish Republic: Tarnobrzeg Voivodeship
- From 1999 Poland: Subcarpathian Voivodeship

=== Tarnowski family ===
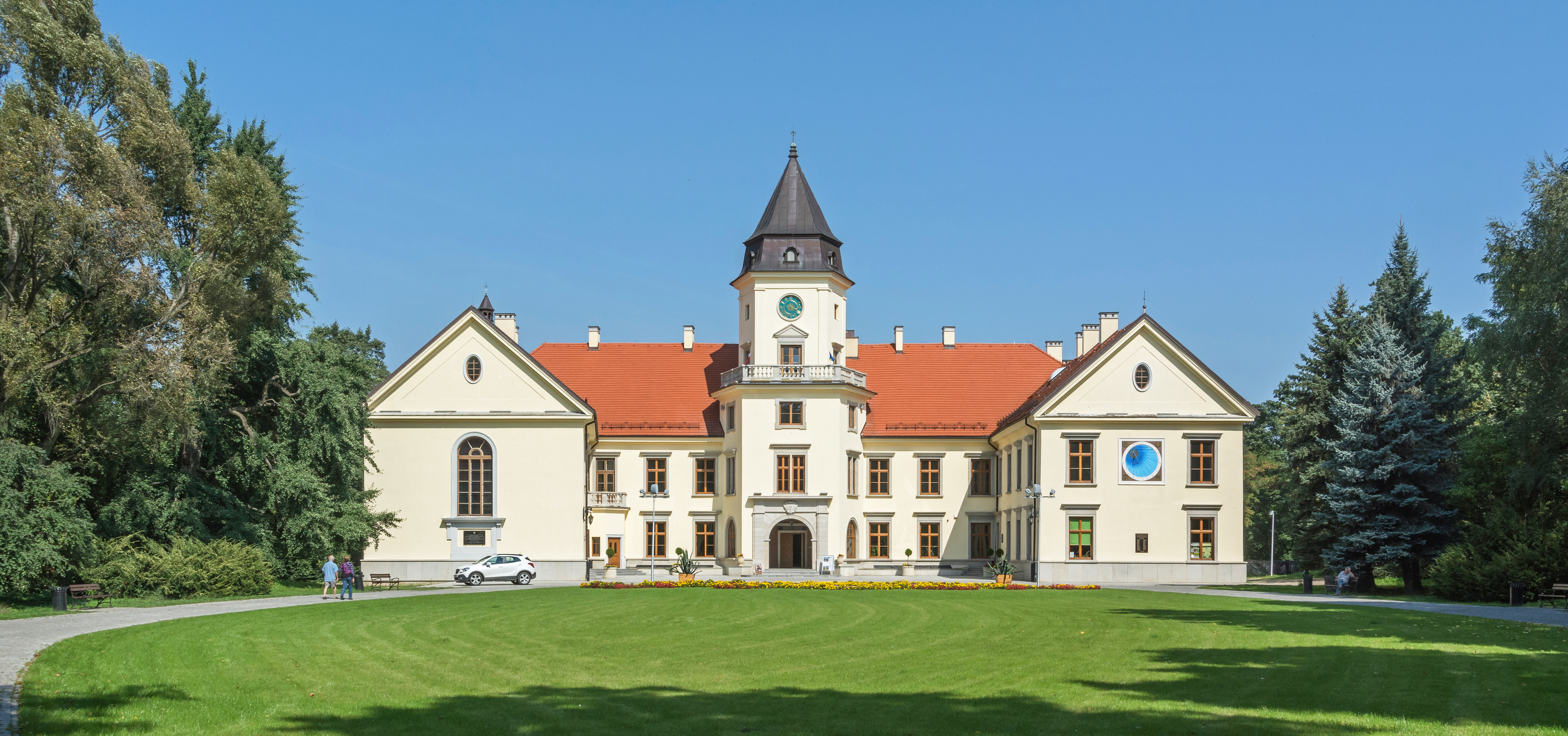
Tarnowski Castle

The history of Tarnobrzeg is closely tied with the noble Leliwita family, which in the 16th century changed its name into Tarnowski. In 1349 Rafal of Tarnów married a woman named Dzierzka, who was the owner of Wielowieś, moving there after the wedding. Their estate gradually expanded, in 1365 they purchased Trzesn and Rzochow, in 1375 Sielec and Sobow, and in 1397, Jan Tarnowski purchased several villages. In the late 15th century, Jan Spytek Tarnowski purchased, among others, Dzików, together with its fortified stronghold. Stanislaw Tarnowski (1541–1609), who was a courtier of Kings Stefan Batory and Sigismund III, managed to convince the latter to grant town charter to Nowy Tarnów, later called Tarnobrzeg. His son Michal Stanislaw (1590–1654) in the 1620s began expansion and modernization of the town, planning a street system together with a market square with a town hall. Furthermore, he expanded the Dzików stronghold and the church at Miechocin.

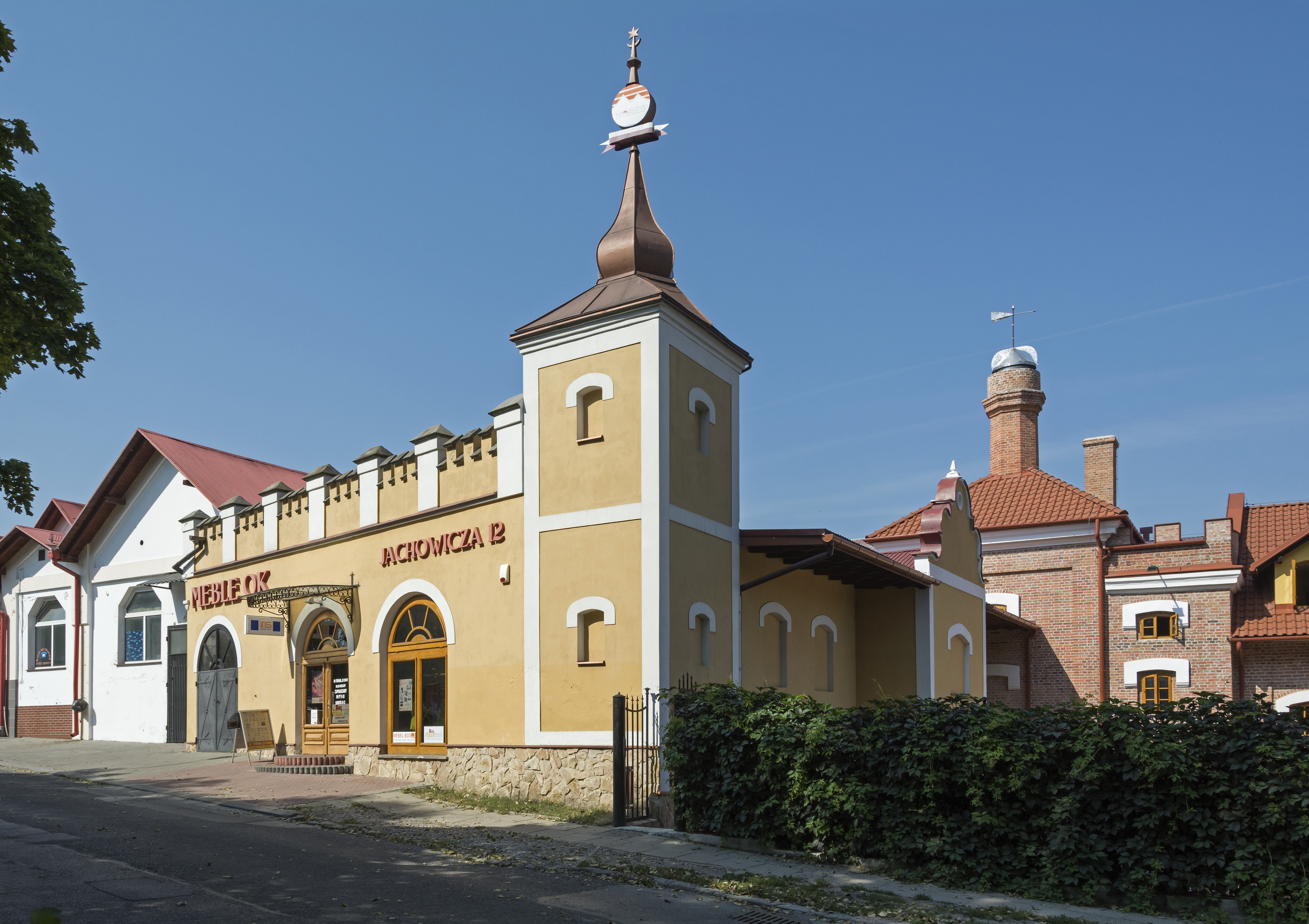
Tarnowski family brewery in Tarnobrzeg

The development of Nowy Tarnów was stopped during the catastrophic Swedish invasion of Poland (1655–1660), when the town was destroyed by the Swedes. After the invasion, Jan Stanislaw Tarnowski funded a Dominican Monastery, with the painting of Our Lady of Dzików (1678), which was moved there from the Dzików Castle. In 1734, the Dzików Confederation was formed in the Dzików Castle, and among its creators was Jozef Mateusz Tarnowski. In the late 18th century, the castle was remodelled in the late Baroque style, and last owners of Dzików were Jan Zdzislaw Tarnowski (1862–1937), and Artur Tarnowski (1903–1984).

=== Jewish community ===
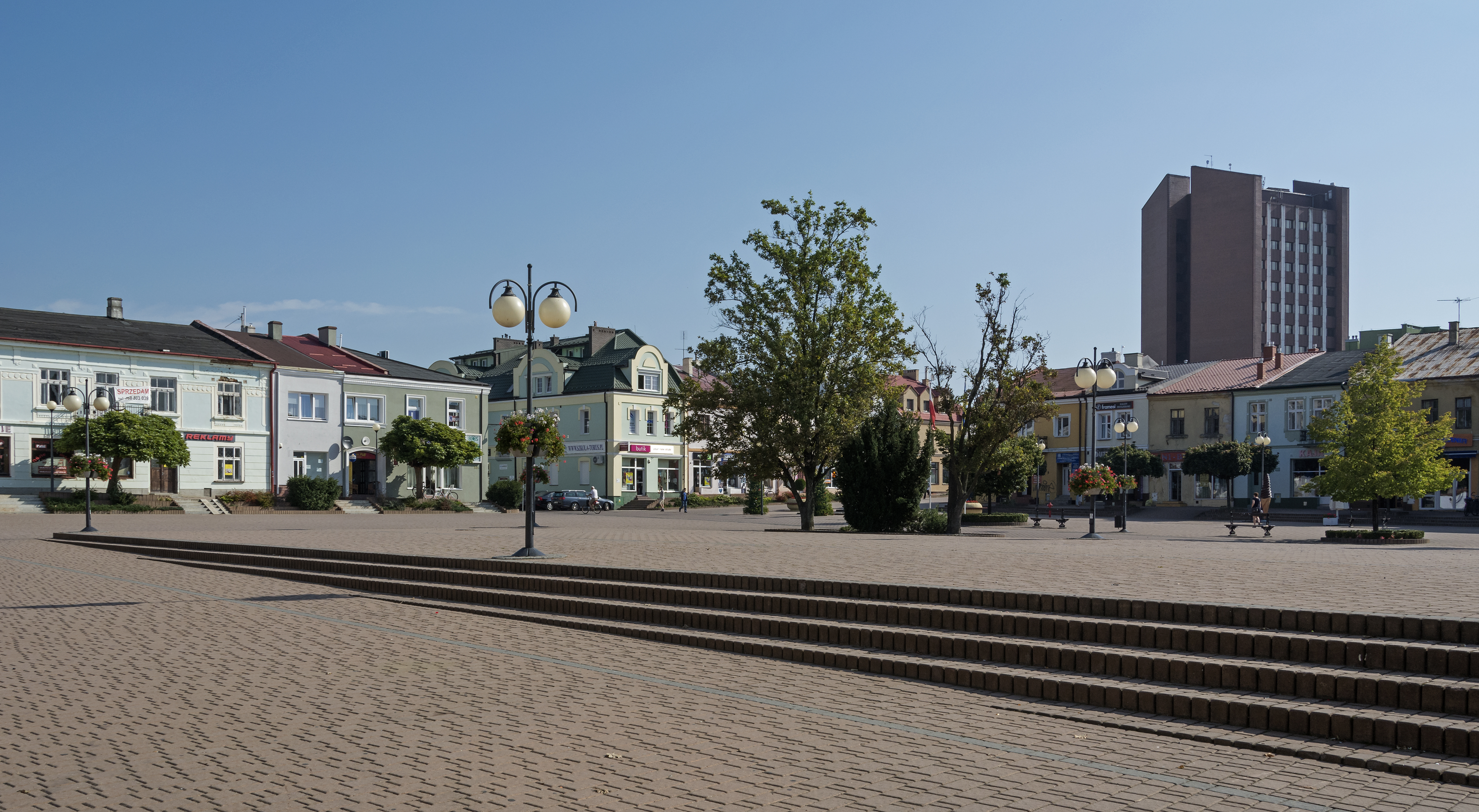
Tarnobrzeg market square

Pre-Holocaust Tarnobrzeg, a shtetl of western Galicia, was home to a thriving traditional Jewish community. Tarnobrzeg is situated in a region of Poland that is relatively distant from the better-known, larger Jewish communities of the country which were located in cities such as Warsaw, Kraków, Lublin, Lwów, and Wilno. Nonetheless, the History of Jews in Poland is confluent with the history of the town. Jewish inhabitants of Tarnobrzeg, and their descendants, are considered Galitzianers or Galician Jews.

In the years 1772–1918 (see: Partitions of Poland), Tarnobrzeg was in the province of Galicia as part of the Austro-Hungarian Empire, based in Vienna. The 19th century after 1815 was, across Europe, a period of relative peace and stability following the conclusion of the extremely violent Napoleonic Wars. Due to progressive initiatives following Napoleonic times, Tarnobrzeg citizens including the Jewish community benefited from free compulsory public education mandated by the Austrian Emperor. The same was not true for other Polish Jewry in areas outside of Galicia (e.g., Danzig or Warsaw). Compulsory public education was opposed by some Jewish religious authorities who believed that traditional Jewish Torah and Talmud studies should not even be partially supplanted by secular instruction.

The political stability in Tarnobrzeg and surrounding areas that ended with the collapse of the Austrian Empire as a result of World War I portended a difficult future for Tarnobrzeg's Jews. Although atrocities and population displacements during World War II dominated the history of Tarnobrzeg's Jews, deportations during World War I to trans-Ural Russia were also highly disruptive and destroyed much of the established community. Many emigrated to the United States or Palestine.

Nearby shtetlach (of, e.g., Rozwadów and Ulanów) had many commercial and family ties to Tarnobrzeg. There were several affinity groups among the thriving Jewish population before World War II, including Hasidic, Zionist, Bundist, and others. Many Jewish citizens of Tarnobrzeg emigrated to Palestine, later to become Israel, during the pre-World War II period.

=== World War II ===
Prior to Nazi German and Soviet invasion of Poland in September 1939, there were 3,800 Jewish residents in Tarnobrzeg. The city was overrun by the Germans on 17 September 1939. In order to inflict terror, five prominent Jews were shot at the town square. Following the signing of the German-Soviet Frontier Treaty Jews were being expelled to the Soviet zone of occupation across the San river beginning 2 October 1939, with many others, deported to Mielec and Sandomierz. The atrocities committed by the German occupiers against Jews and other Polish citizens during the Holocaust forced the Jews to choose between mortally dangerous escape or perish by remaining. Very few Jews are known to have survived in the city, where they would have needed to be hidden for years by citizens. Those migrating east to the Soviet Union had to choose between permanent Soviet citizenship, service in the Red Army in its battles against the Wehrmacht, and loss of freedom to subsequently leave the Soviet Union, or alternatively to become displaced persons (DPs). The DPs were moved to work camps in Siberia. Many died due to extreme conditions and the poor supplies available in wartime trans-Ural Russian Asia. Those who survived were permitted to depart the Soviet Union after World War II.

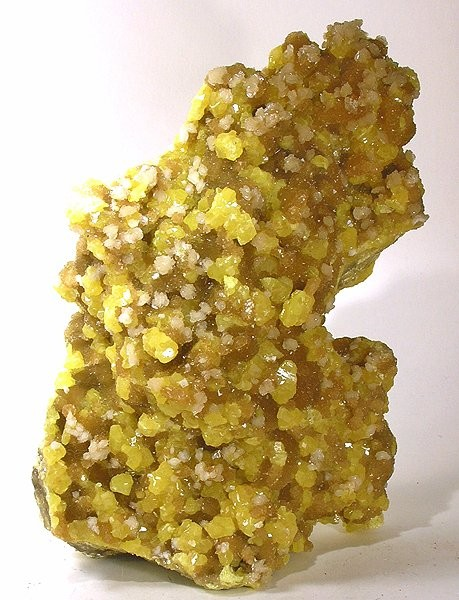
Yellow gold of Tarnobrzeg

== Economy ==
The city was a major center for the mining and processing of sulphur and sulphuric acid. However, due to declining profitability, its mines have closed. The mine in Piaseczno was closed first, followed by the Machów mine (after 40 years of working — it had been the biggest open-cast sulphur mine in Europe), and finally the Jeziórko mine in the 1990s. The Jeziórko mine stayed open longer than the others because of the introduction of the modern Frasch process of sulphur extraction.

Since the 1980s, the land in the mining areas has gradually been reclaimed. The Machów mine has been filled with water to form a reservoir used for recreation, and the same is happening to the Jeziórko mine — it is being slowly filled from the nearby Vistula river.

== Tourism ==
Tourist attractions in Tarnobrzeg
Place:	Photo:	Information:	Notes:
Dominican Church and Convent		Marian Sanctuary of Our Lady of Dzików, Baroque monastery from the end of 17th century, step of St. James Lesser Polish Way, situated close to Głowacki Sq in Old Town	open 6am – 7pm, tourism visitation forbidden during worship services
Chapel and Monastery of Dominicans Sisters and church of St. Michael and St Gertrude in Wielowieś		complex of buildings from half of the 19th century, a tomb of the founder of the assembly Róża Kolumba Białecka is located at a monastery, its roots go back to the 13th century, according to tradition, the original wooden church was associated with the activities of the Dominican – St. Hyacinth	conservation works inside the church
Dzików Castle with park and garden complex		works on transferring the Historical Museum of City	thorough restoration and repair work, possible visit the cellars, open Tue – Fri 10am – 4pm; Sun 12am – 4pm, end of work and reopen in 2011 or 2012
Jewish Graveyard		founded in 1930	closed for visitors
Tarnobrzeg synagogue		built in the second half of 19th century, now used as the Municipal Public Library	open Mon – Fri 10am – 6pm, Sat 8am – 3pm
Church of Mary Magdalene in Miechocin		Gothic church from the 14th century, its roots go back to the beginnings of Christianity in the Polish territories	closed apart from hours of worship services, Weekdays 6pm, Sun and Fest 7:30am, 10:35am, 5pm
Shindler's Hunting Palace in Tarnobrzeg Mokrzyszów		Neogothic building from the 19th century, at present, adapted up to needs of the Centre Of The Teacher Education	
Church of Our Lady of Perpetual Help in Serbinów		huge mosaic presbytery, relics of saints and blessed: Edmund Bojanowski, Jan Bosko, Albert Chmielowski, Zygmunt Gorazdowski, Mother Teresa, Faustyna Kowalska, Gianna Beretta Molla, Padre Pio	Perpetual Adoration Chapel open around the clock, the upper church opened in hours of worship services, Weekdays 6am, 8am, 3pm, 6pm, Sun and Fest 7am, 8:30 am, 10am, 11:30am, 1pm, 4pm, 5pm, 7:30pm
Padewicz Manor House in Tarnobrzeg-Nagnajów		Classical building, situated close to the Wisłostrada St.	closed
Zwierzyniecki Wood		rest of Sandomierska Wilderness	Zwierzyniecka St leads from the Dzików Castle through Serbinów to the wood
Machowski Reservoir		artificial reservoir built on the premises of the former sulfur mine, situated close to the Wisłostrada St.	open in 2010
Former Tarnobrzeg Granary in Wymysłów		built in 1843, now used as the Historical Museum of City	open Tue – Fri 8am – 3pm; Sat 12am – 4pm
Monument of Bartosz Głowacki		built in 1904, situated in the main Town Square, vis-à-vis of Dominican Monastery	
Tarnobrzeg City Hall		Eclectic building from 1910, former County Hall, now the office of the Mayor of Tarnobrzeg, situated close to Surowieckiego Sq	open 7:30am – 3:30pm
Former Burgher Casino		built in early 20th century, now Community Centre of Culture, situated close to Sokola St	

== Roman Catholic churches and parishes ==
- Church of Mary Magdalene – around 1160, parish since around 1132
- Church of Saint Gertrude and Saint Michael – first church 12th century, parish since 1215, current church 1884
- Monastery of Dominicans – 1667 (wooden), 1706, parish since 1922
- Church of Our Lady of Perpetual Help – wooden church 1979, current church 1984, Parish of Our Lady since 1980
- Church of Good Shepherd – 1990, parish since 1972
- Church of Our Lady of Częstochowa in Tarnobrzeg – 1991, parish since 1969
- Church of Saint Barbara – wooden church 1988, current church 1996, parish since 1989
- Church of Divine Mercy – 1996, parish since 1997
- Church of Visitation – 1997, parish since 1985
- Church of Christ the King – 2003, parish since 2003
- Chapel of All Saints – 2009
- Monastery of Dominicans Sisters in Tarnobrzeg

== Sport ==
- Siarka Tarnobrzeg – football club
- Tarnobrzeg Municipal Stadium

== Cyclical events ==
- New Year's Run – January
- Tarnobrzeg Days – May, June
- International Organ Virtuoso Performances – July, August
- Saint Dominic's Fair – August
- Bartoszki Film Festival – August
- Satyrblues – September
- International Alfred Freyer Vistula River Run – October
- Tarnobrzeg Social Days and Tarnobrzeg Days of The Christian Culture – October
- Barbórkowa Drama Teatralna – December

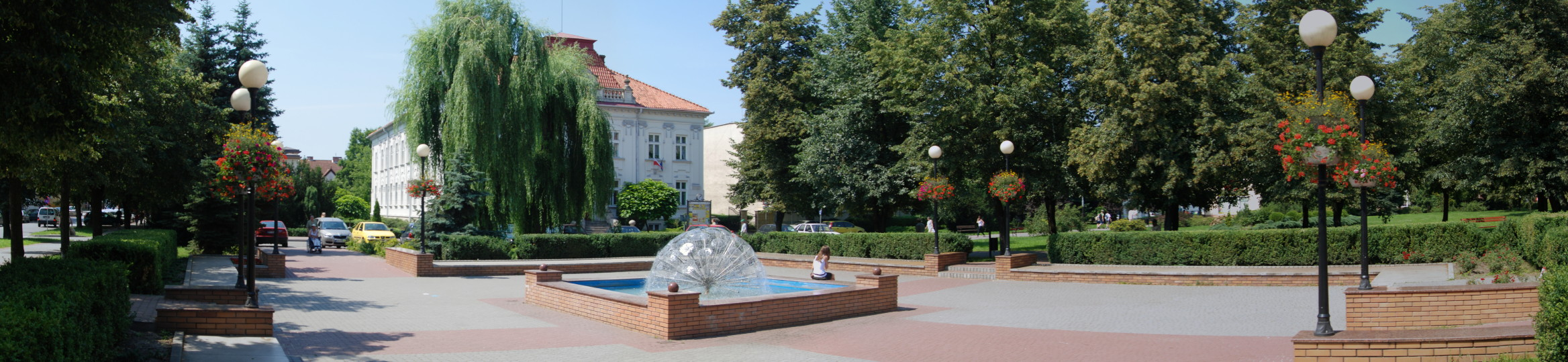
Antoni Surowiecki Square

== Twin towns – sister cities ==
Tarnobrzeg is twinned with:

- Banská Bystrica in Slovakia (since 1995)
- Chernihiv in Ukraine (since 2008)

== See also ==
- Tarnowski family
- Siarka Tarnobrzeg – local football team
- Dzików Castle
- Lesser Polish Way
