= Jewish Cemetery, Tarnobrzeg =

Cemetery in Poland

Jewish Cemetery in Tarnobrzeg
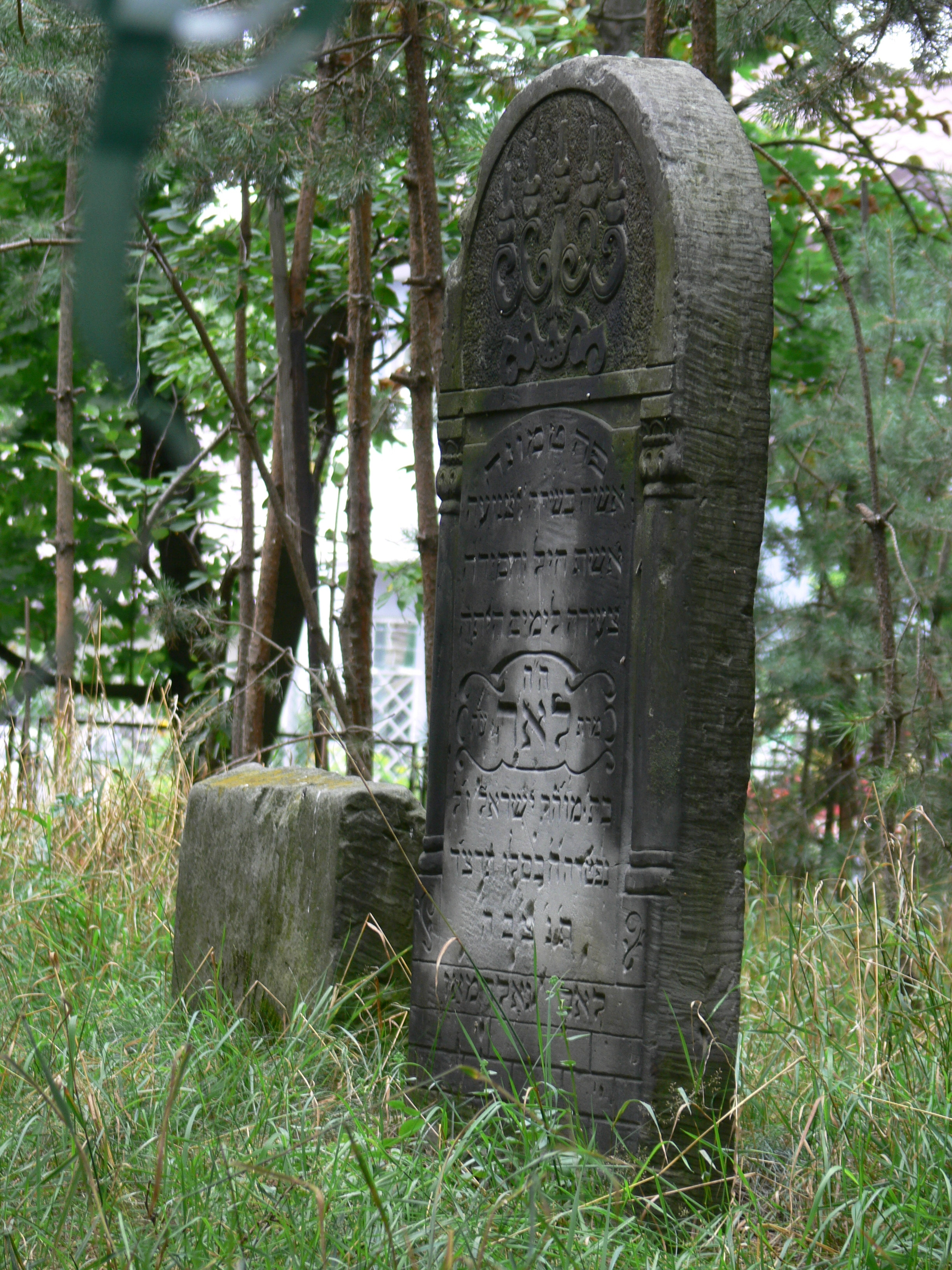
- 2007 photo. Remaining Matzevot
- Interactive map of Jewish Cemetery in Tarnobrzeg

Details
- Established: 1930
- Location: Serbinów; Tarnobrzeg; Subcarpathian Voivodeship
- Country: Poland
- Coordinates: 50°34′19″N 21°41′13″E
- Type: Jewish cemetery

The historic Jewish Cemetery of Tarnobrzeg, Poland, was founded in 1930 in the Serbinów neighbourhood (now housing estate) of Tarnobrzeg, in the Second Polish Republic. The Jewish cemetery is located close to Sienkiewicza and Dąbrowskiej Streets.

The thriving and traditional Jewish community of Tarnobrzeg established in the 17th century was eradicated during the Holocaust in occupied Poland in World War II.

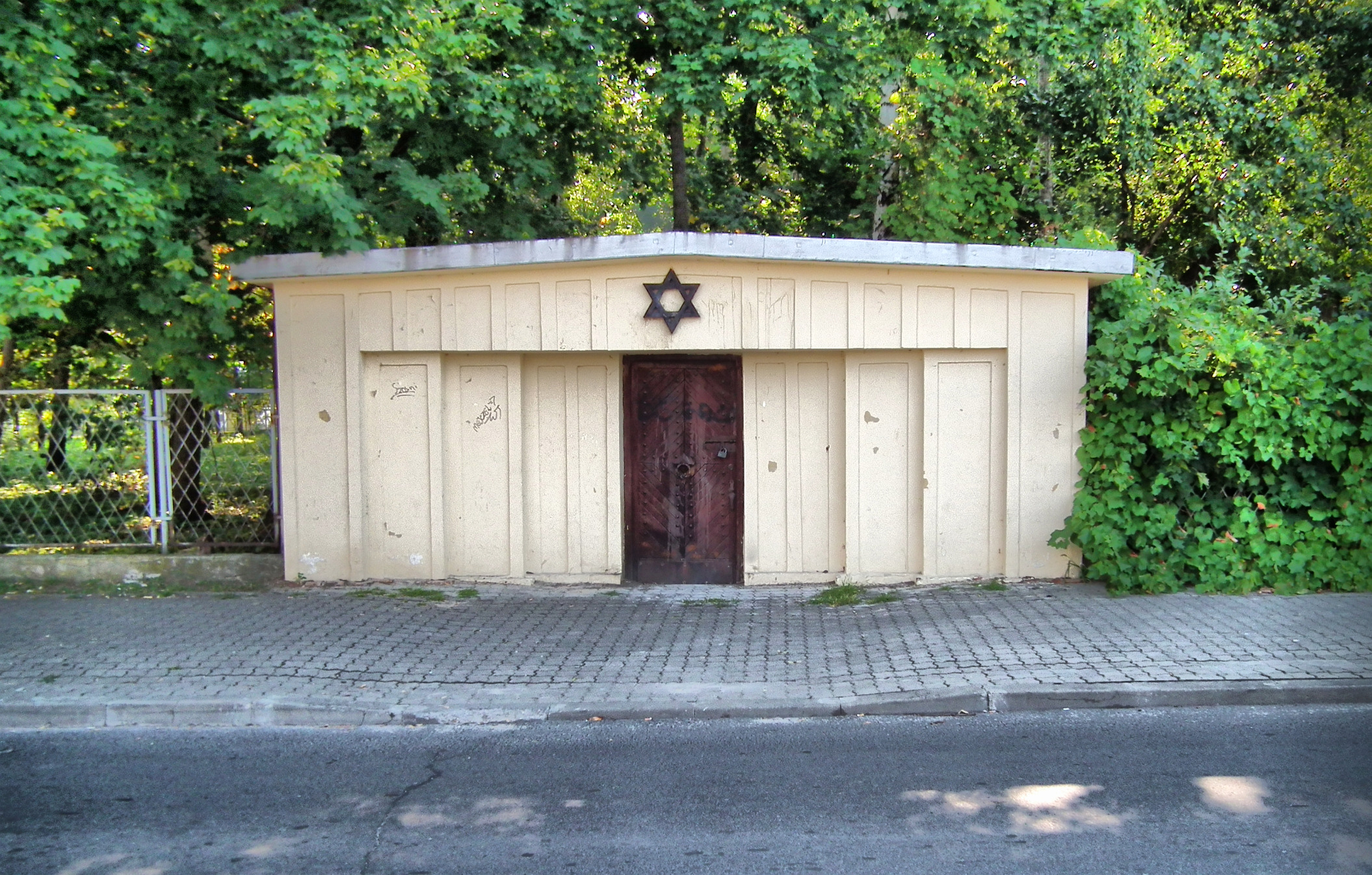
The Ohel (Hebrew: אוהל) at the Tarnobrzeg Cemetery

== See also ==
- Extinct Jewish community of Tarnobrzeg
- History of the Jews in Poland
