= Wielopole, Tarnobrzeg =

Wielopole
- Tarnobrzeg District
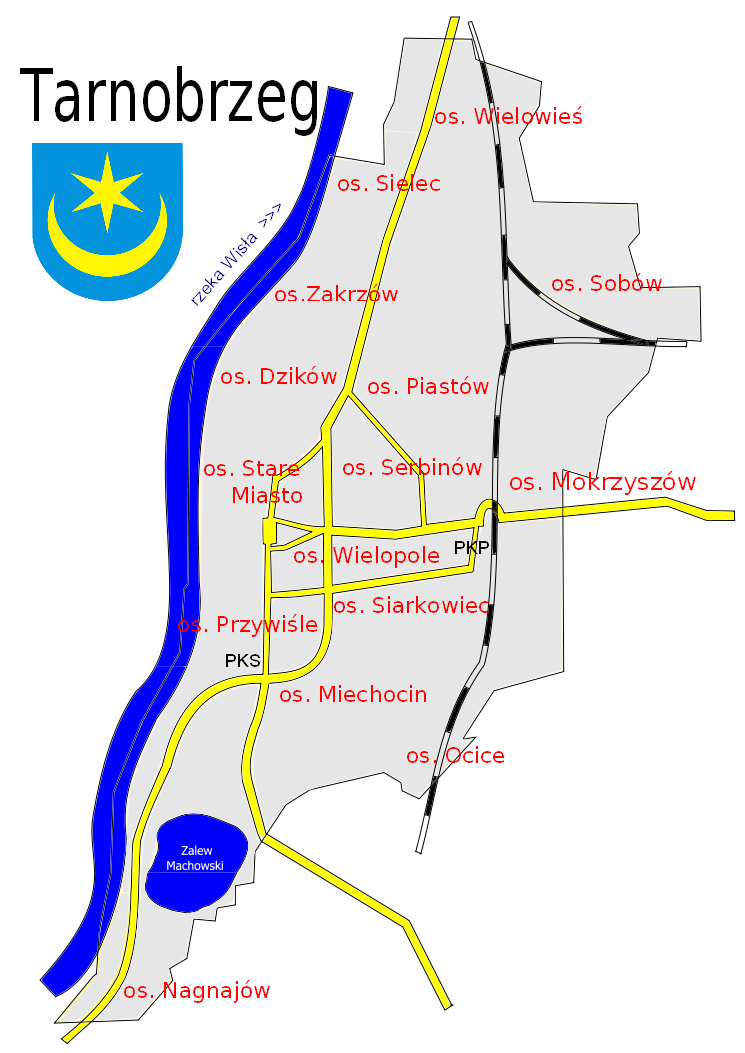
- Country: Poland
- Voivodeship: Podkarpackie
- County/City: Tarnobrzeg

Population
  - Total: around 1,500
- Time zone: UTC+1 (CET)
  - Summer (DST): UTC+2 (CEST)

Wielopole is an administrative district within the city of Tarnobrzeg, Poland. It was formerly a village before it was annexed by the city in 1976.
