= Ocice, Tarnobrzeg =

Coordinates: 50°32′33″N 21°40′47″E

Ocice
- Tarnobrzeg District
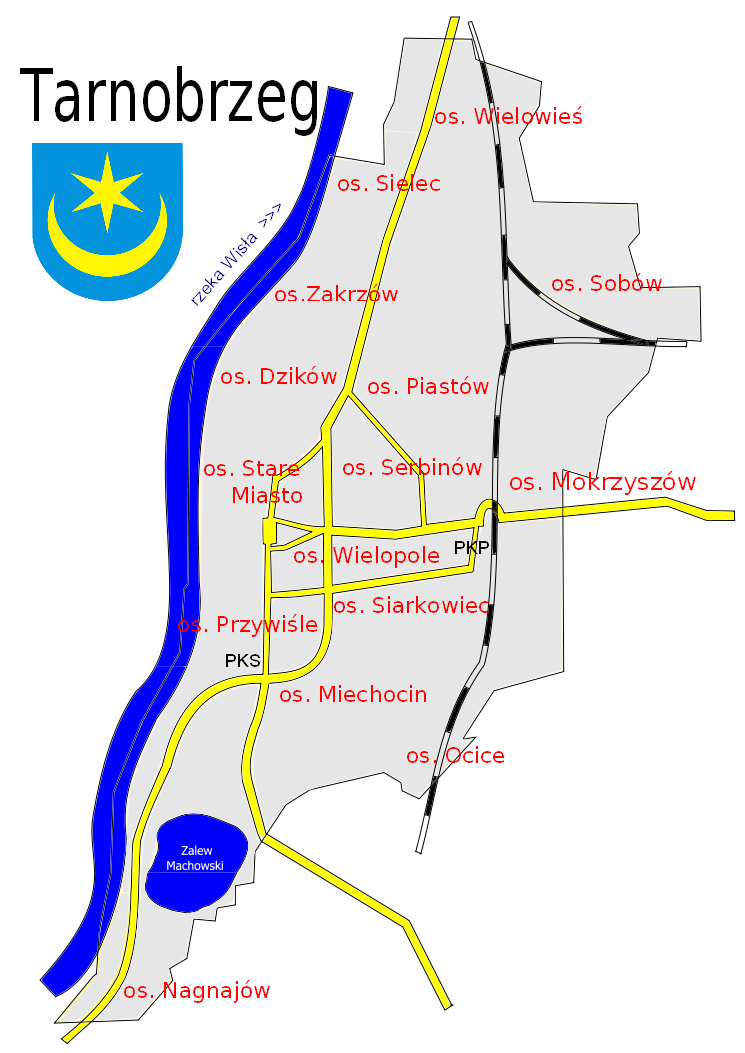
- Country: Poland
- Voivodeship: Podkarpackie
- County/City: Tarnobrzeg
- Time zone: UTC+1 (CET)
  - Summer (DST): UTC+2 (CEST)
- Postal code: 39-400
- Area code: +48 15

Ocice is a sparsely populated district, which was annexed by Tarnobrzeg in 1976. It is located in the outskirts of the town, and has a railroad junction station.
