= Zakrzów, Tarnobrzeg =

Zakrzów
- Tarnobrzeg District
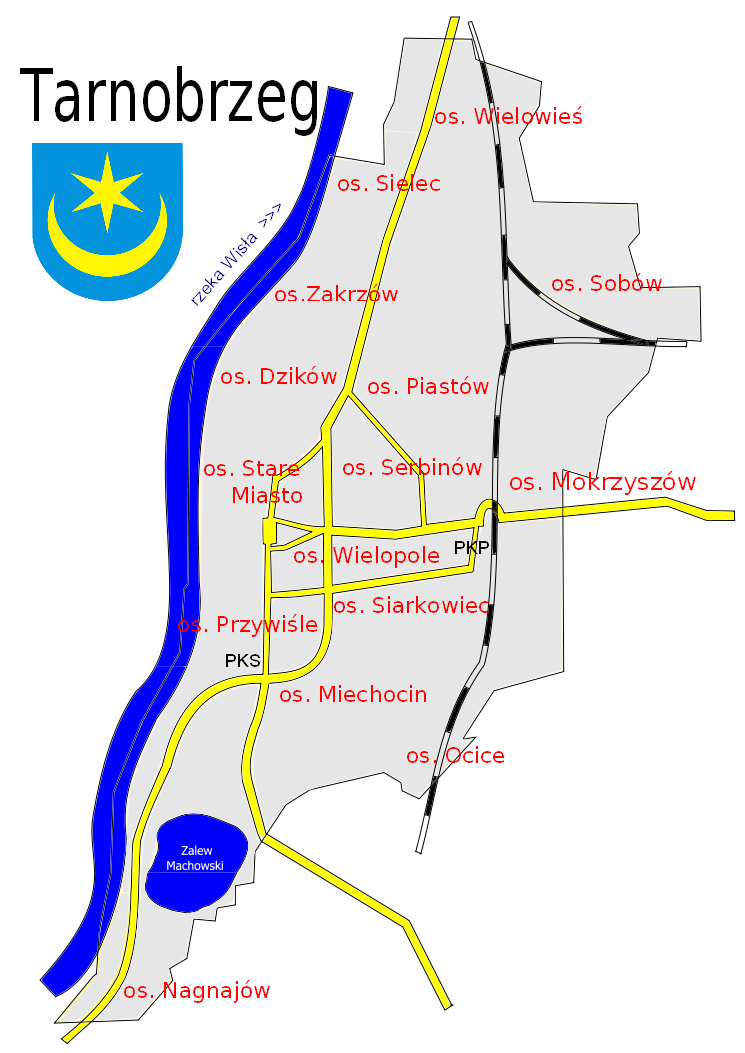

- Location within Subcarpathian Voivodeship Location within Poland
- Coordinates: 50.607386°N 21.707439°E
- Country: Poland
- Voivodeship: Podkarpackie
- County/City: Tarnobrzeg
- Time zone: UTC+1 (CET)
  - Summer (DST): UTC+2 (CEST)
- Postal code: 39-400
- Area code: +48 15

Zakrzów is a district in the city of Tarnobrzeg, Poland.
