= Sanctuary of Our Lady of Dzików =

Church building in Tarnobrzeg, Poland

Coordinates: 50°34′29″N 21°40′22″E

Dominican Church and Convent of Assumption of Mary, Sanctuary of Our Lady of Dzików
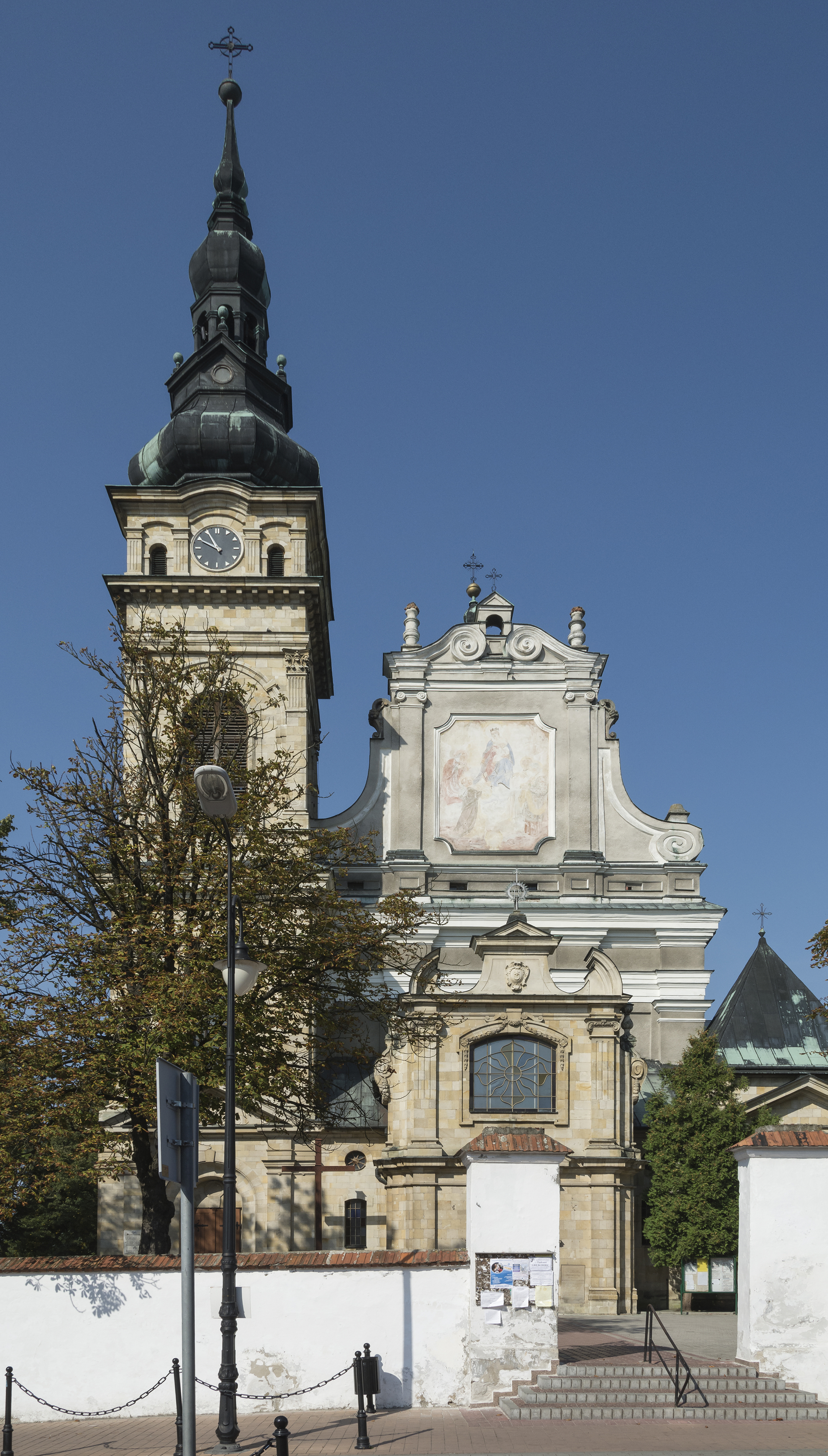
- View from the Głowacki Square

Religion
- Affiliation: Roman Catholic
- Province: Podkarpackie Voivodeship / Roman Catholic Diocese of Sandomierz
- Region: Tarnobrzeg
- Rite: Latin
- Year consecrated: 17 February 1677

Location
- State: Poland
- Interactive map of Dominican Church and Convent of Assumption of Mary, Sanctuary of Our Lady of Dzików

Architecture
- Style: baroque

Sanctuary of Our Lady of Dzików, Monastery of Dominicans in Tarnobrzeg was built in 1706.

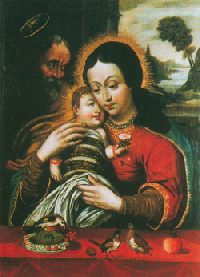
Our Lady of Tarnobrzeg

== See also ==
- Dzików Castle – around 1 km from the monastery
- Church of Our Lady of Perpetual Help – other church in Tarnobrzeg
