= Sielec, Tarnobrzeg =

Sielec
- Tarnobrzeg District
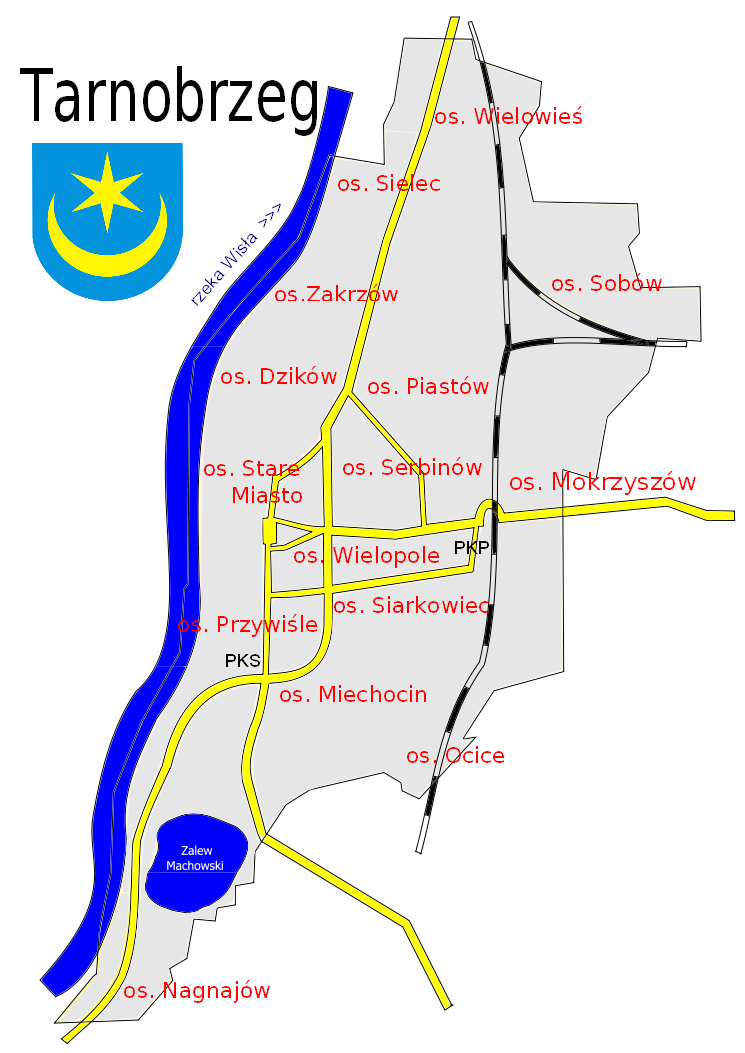
- Country: Poland
- Voivodeship: Podkarpackie
- County/City: Tarnobrzeg
- Notable landmarks: Chapel of Saint Hyacinth
- Time zone: UTC+1 (CET)
  - Summer (DST): UTC+2 (CEST)
- Postal code: 39-400
- Area code: +48 15

Sielec is a district in the city of Tarnobrzeg, Poland.

Sielec is a former royal village in Podkarpackie Voivodeship, Poland, which was incorporated into Tarnobrzeg in 1975. It is located in the northern part of the town, bordering Wielowieś, Sobów and Zakrzów.
