= Mokrzyszów, Tarnobrzeg =

Coordinates: 50°34′N 21°43′E

Mokrzyszów
- Tarnobrzeg District
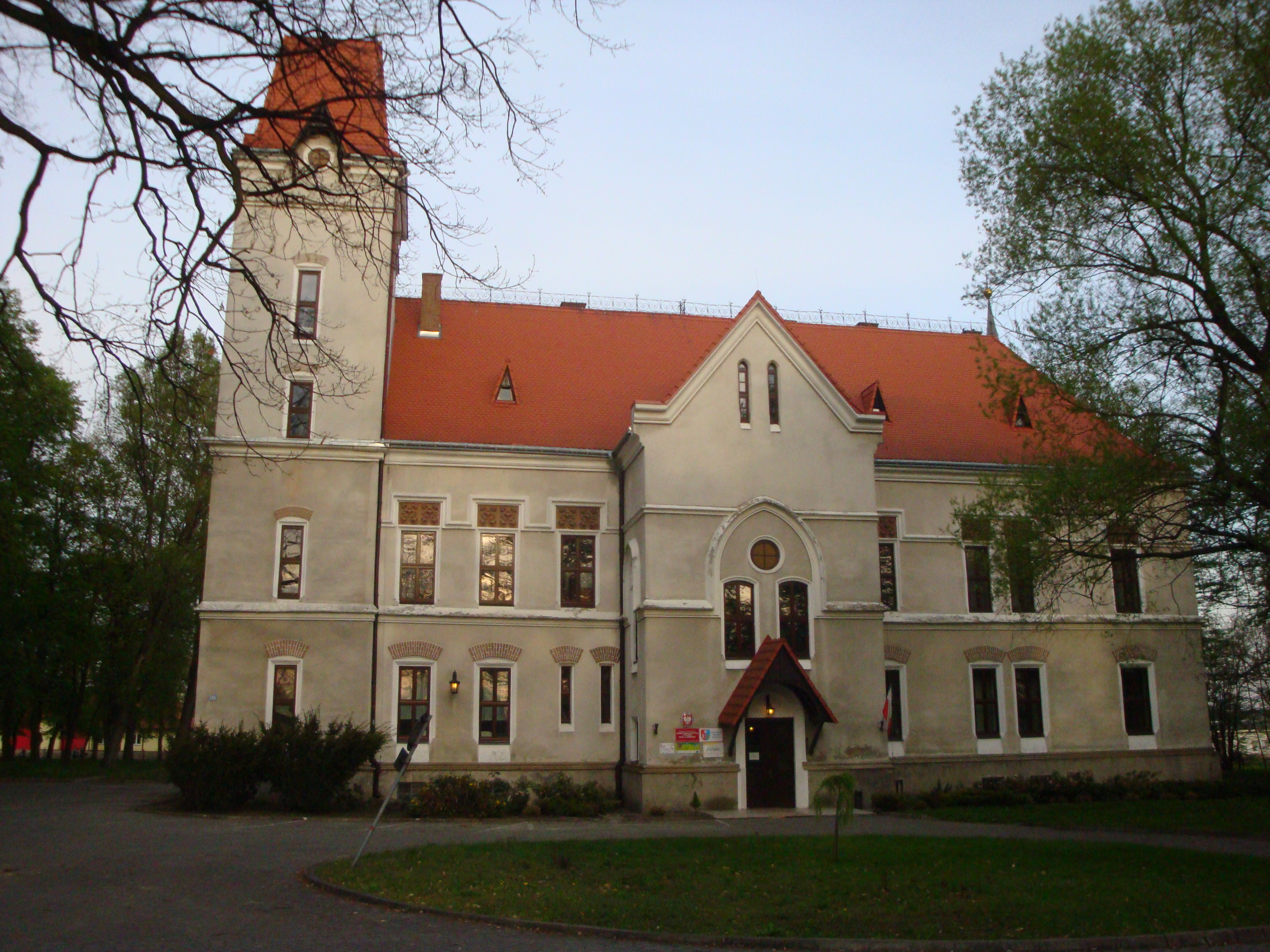

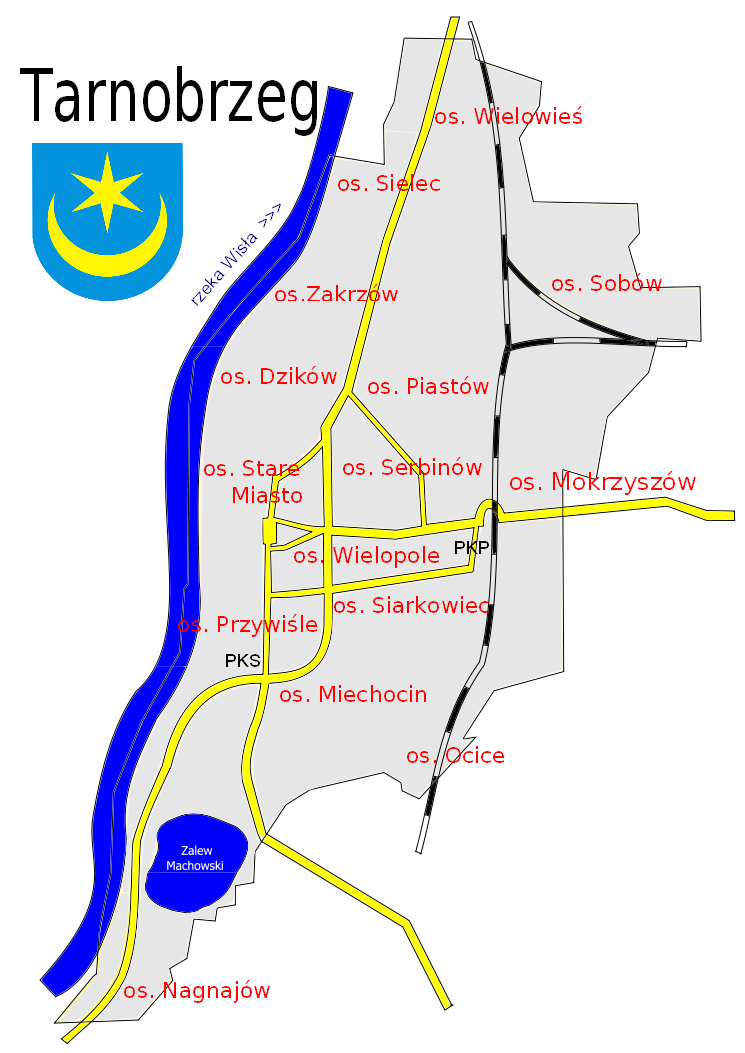
- Country: Poland
- Voivodeship: Podkarpackie
- County/City: Tarnobrzeg
- Time zone: UTC+1 (CET)
  - Summer (DST): UTC+2 (CEST)
- Postal code: 39–400
- Area code: +48 15

Mokrzyszów is a former village in Podkarpackie Voivodeship, Poland, now part of Tarnobrzeg.

== History ==
Mokrzyszow used to be a rural village, which in 1976 became a district of Tarnobrzeg. For centuries, the village belonged to the Starosta of Sandomierz, and after the Partitions of Poland, it was transferred to the government of the Habsburg Empire, which leased it to several noblemen, such as Karol Kaschmitz, and Jan Feliks Tarnowski. in 1829, Vienna decided to sell the village, which was in 1835 purchased by Antoni Teodor Schindler from Moravia. In 1905, Mokrzyszow was purchased by Countess Zofia Tarnowska, who in 1915 opened here an orphanage.
