= Regions of Poland =

Polish regions are regions that are in present-day Poland but are not identified in its administrative division.

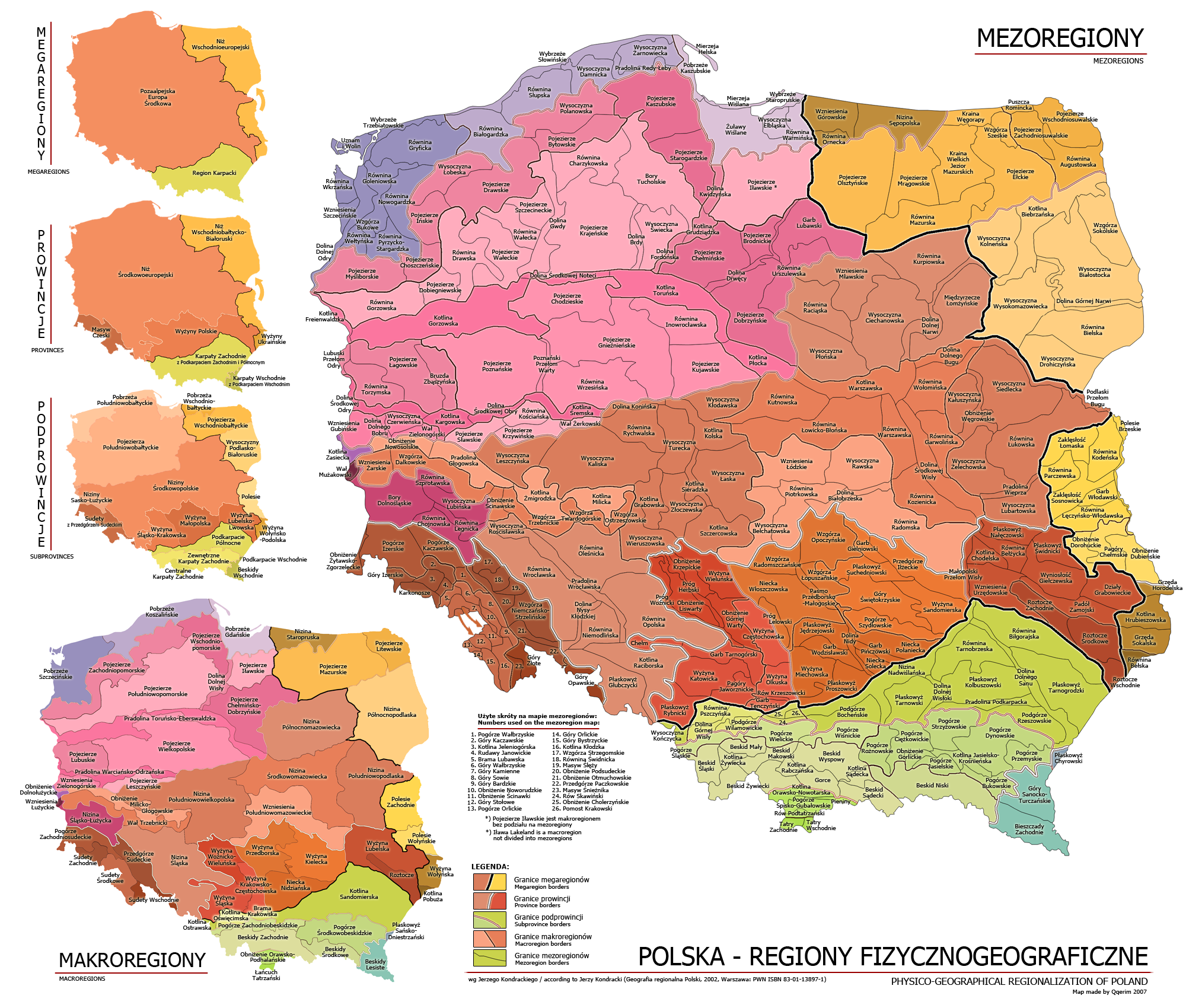
Geophysical regions of Poland according to Jerzy Kondracki

== Geophysical regions ==
(Transborder regions = *)

Northern & Western Poland

- Central European Plain* (Nizina Środkowoeuropejska)
- Silesia*
- Pomerania*

Southern Poland

- Bohemian Massif* (Masyw Czeski)
- Polish Highlands (Wyżyny Polskie)
- Sandomierz Basin (Kotlina Sandomierska)
- Subcarpathia*
  - Western Subcarpathia* (Podkarpacie Zachodnie)
  - Northern Subcarpathia (Podkarpacie Północne) and
  - Eastern Subcarpathia* (Podkarpacie Wschodnie)
- Carpathian Mountains*
  - Western Carpathians* (Karpaty Zachodnie) and
  - Eastern Carpathians* (Karpaty Wschodnie)

Eastern Poland

- Ukrainian Highlands* (Wyżyny Ukraińskie)
- East Baltic-Belarusian Lowlands* (Niż Wschodniobałtycko-Białoruski)

== Historical regions ==
- Cherven Cities/Red Ruthenia/Galicia (Polish: Grody Czerwieńskie/Ruś Czerwona/Galicja)
- Greater Poland (Polish: Wielkopolska)
- Kłodzko Land (Polish: ziemia kłodzka)
- Kuyavia (Polish: Kujawy)
- Lesser Poland (Polish: Małopolska)
- Lubusz Land (Polish: ziemia lubuska)
- Lusatia (Polish: Łużyce)
- Łęczyca Land (Polish: ziemia łęczycka)
- Masuria (Polish: Mazury)
- Mazovia (Polish: Mazowsze)
- Orava (Polish: Orawa)
- Podlachia (Polish: Podlasie)
- Polesia (Polish: Polesie)
- Pomerania (Polish: Pomorze)
- Sieradz Land (Polish: ziemia sieradzka)
- Silesia (Polish: Śląsk)
- Spisz (Polish: Spisz)
- Suwałki Region (Polish: Suwalszczyzna)
- Warmia (Polish: Warmia)
- Wieluń Land (Polish: ziemia wieluńska)

== See also ==
- Administrative divisions of Poland
- Historical regions of Central Europe
- Territorial changes of Poland
- Voivodeships of Poland
