= Dzików Castle =

Castle in Tarnobrzeg, Poland

Coordinates: 50.5794°N 21.6756°E

Dzików Castle in Tarnobrzeg
- Zamek Tarnowskich w Dzikowie
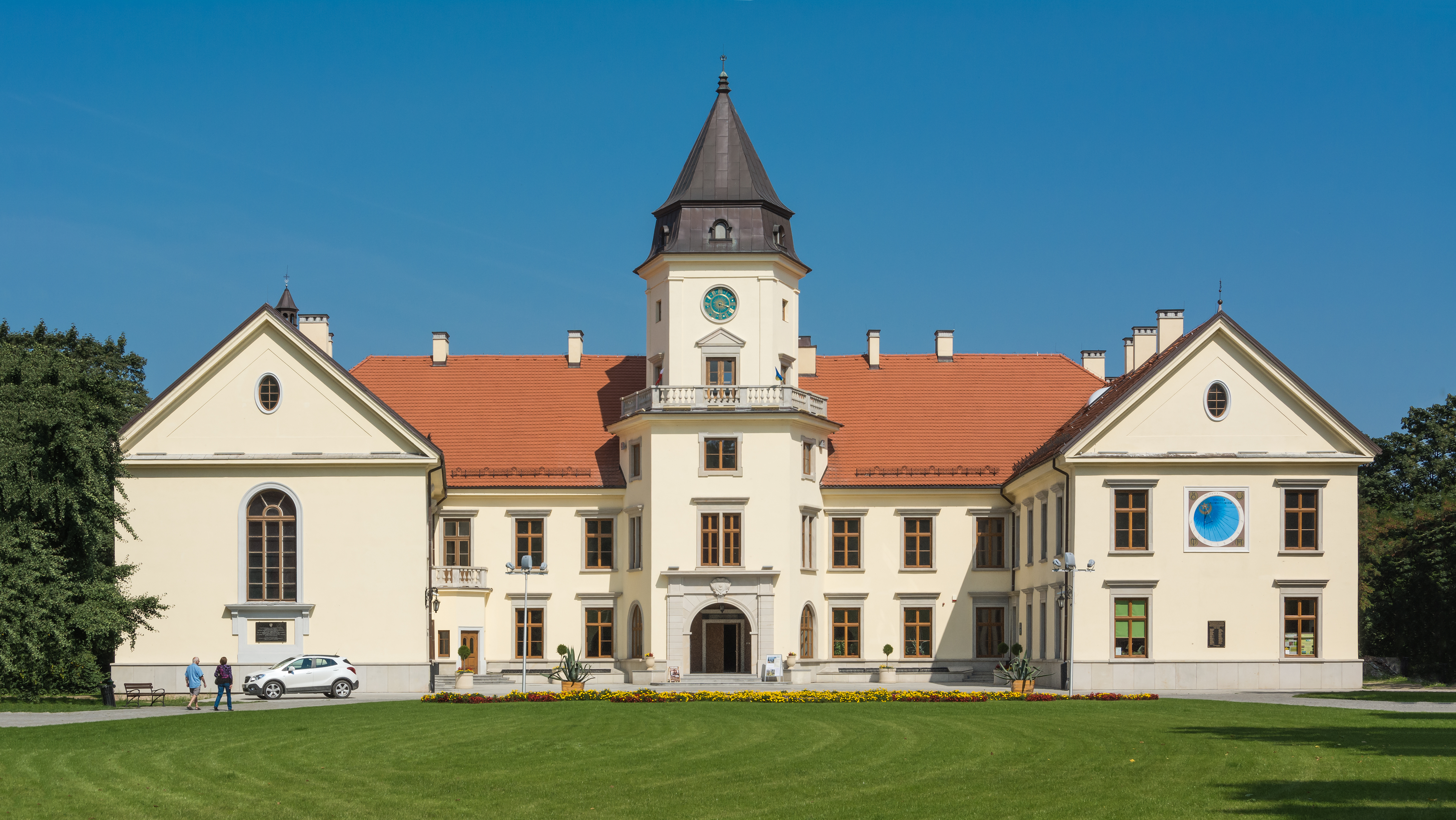
- Front view
- Former names: Residence of the Tarnowski Family
- Alternative names: Tarnowski Family Castle in Dzików, Dzików Palace in Tarnobrzeg

General information
- Type: castle
- Architectural style: neogothic (1830–1927), neobaroque (current)
- Location: 50°34'46"N 21°40'32"E, Tarnobrzeg, Poland
- Construction started: end of 14th century
- Completed: 15th century
- Renovated: 1830, 1931
- Destroyed: 1927 (fire)
- Demolished: 1809 (Napoleonic war)
- Owner: Ossoliński family (since 15th century), Tarnowski family (1522–1945), State Treasury (Skarb Państwa) (since 1945)

Design and construction
- Architects: Franciszek Maria Lanci (1830), Wacław Krzyżanowski (1931)

Dzików Castle or Tarnowski Family Castle in Dzików (Polish: Zamek Tarnowskich w Dzikowie) is a 15th-century (or perhaps a 14th-century) castle located in Tarnobrzeg, Poland. It is set in a park complex with gardens.

== History ==
The building of the castle was started in the 15th century as a fortified residence. In the 17th and 18th centuries, it was acquired by the Tarnowski family and reconstructed. The castle was a site of the Dzików Confederation of 5 November 1734, led by Adam Tarło, starosta from Jasło, organized in order to reinstate Stanisław Leszczyński as the king of Poland after the death of August II the Strong. However, Leszczyński resigned his command over the confederation, not believing in its success against the superior Saxon and Russian armies. He limited himself only to calls for support from France, Sweden, Turkey and Prussia, but ultimately did not receive any. As a result, Leszczyński consented to abdicate on 26 January 1736; and, as a token of gratitude, received the perpetual right to use the royal title. The Dzików Confederation ended in failure. In 1830, the castle was reconstructed in the Gothic Revival style by Franciszek Maria Lanci.

== Art collection ==
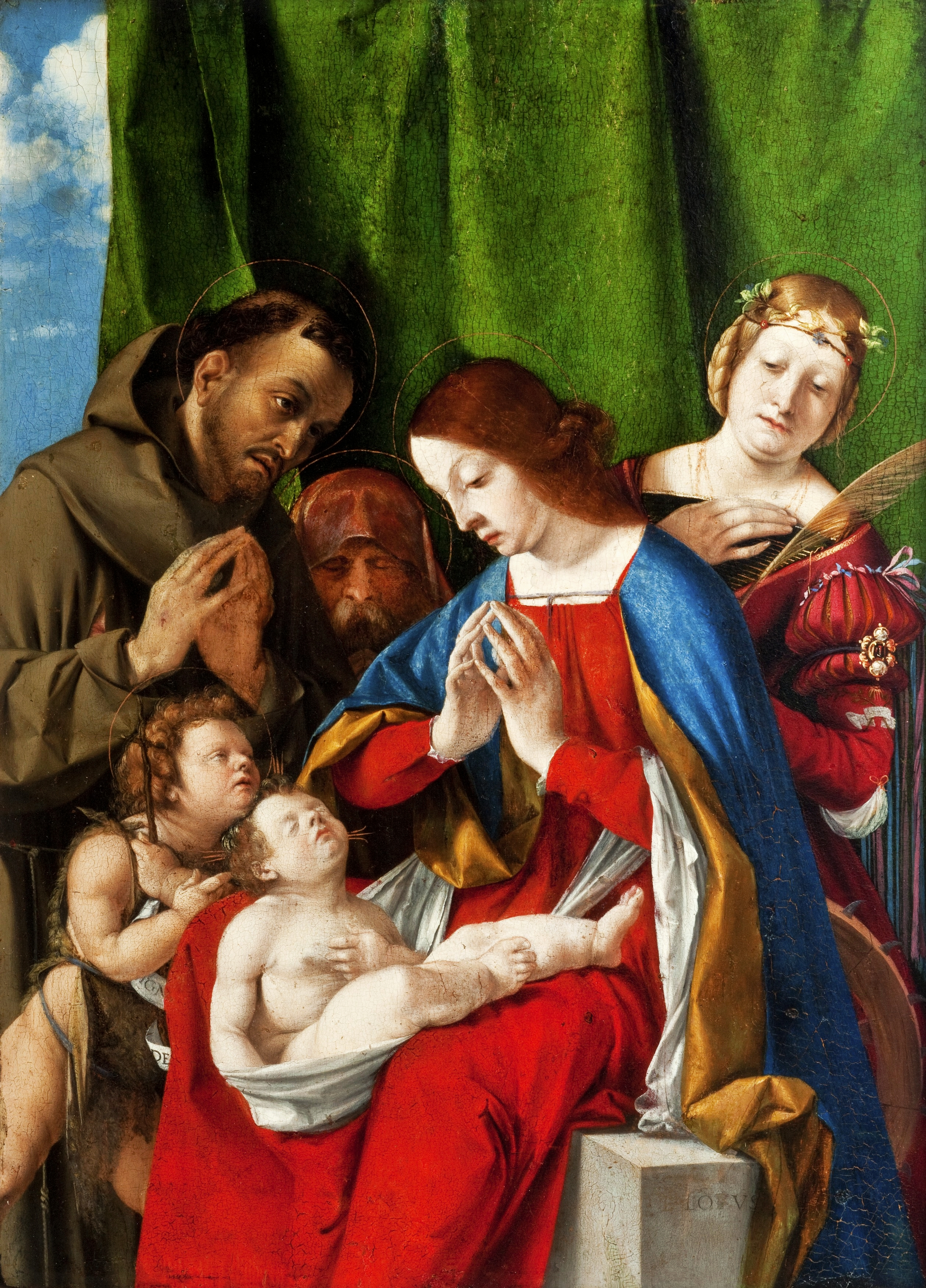
The Adoration of the Child, Lorenzo Lotto

Over the years, the Tarnowski family acquired an impressive art collection housed in the castle. In the 19th century, there were 250 paintings there, among others of Titian, Rubens, Rembrandt, Jacek Malczewski, and Jan Matejko. Apart from the paintings there were also valuable prints there including the oldest copy of the Polish Chronicle by Gallus Anonymus, manuscript Pan Tadeusz by Adam Mickiewicz, the first Bogurodzica copy, the original Chronicles by Wincenty Kadłubek and the Wiślica Statutes. The Polish Rider by Rembrandt, also known as Lisowczyk, one of the most valuable paintings in Poland, was found in Dzikovia Tarnowski collections. In 1910, it was sold by Zdzisław Tarnowski to Henry Frick and taken away to New York, in spite of the public protests. It is currently displayed in the Frick Collection. During the war, priceless treasures of the national and European culture were left carefully hidden in Dzików, as well as deposited in the National Museum in Warsaw and Ossolineum in Lwów. Later all sorts of state institutions seized them, e.g. they are in a Łańcut Castle, close to 500 exhibit items around Dzikowia, and in the Rzeszów Museum there are over 80. The deposited part was only left scarce in the West, quite a lot of it, however, went missing without trace with eastern areas seized by Soviets.

On 21 December 1927, the castle was badly affected by a fire in which some of the collections were destroyed. 8 people died during the evacuation of priceless items from the castle, including Alfred Freyer, Polish long-distance runner and an 8-time Polish Champion. In 1931, the castle was rebuilt in the Baroque Revival style.

In 1974, a treasure chest was discovered in the basements of the palace consisting of old collections of silverware with a considerable number of precious Polish artifacts. The entire collection was transported to the castle in Łańcut.

== Currently ==
From 2007, the palace was under renovation. Roofing was replaced, new foundations were laid, castle basements were repaired. For the first time it is possible to view three new exhibitions: "Ancient history of Tarnobrzeg", "Ceramics of Miechocin" and "History of the castle in Dzikovia".

In 2011, the entire collections of the Historical Museum of the City of Tarnobrzeg (Polish: Muzeum Historyczne Miasta Tarnobrzega) were moved to the castle. The Museum, under the direction of Adam Wójcik and patronage of the City of Tarnobrzeg, was established at the castle in 2009.

== Archival photographs ==
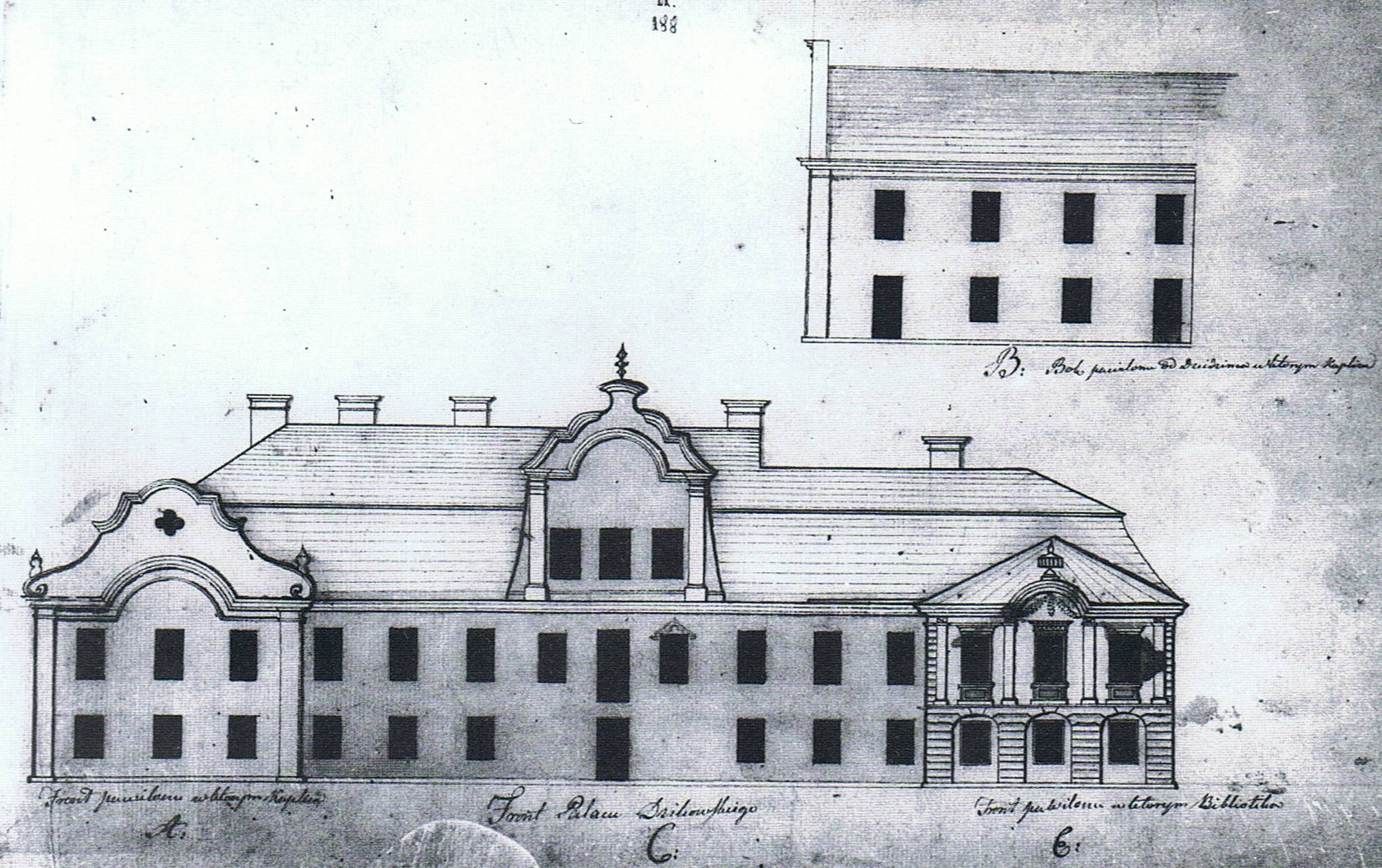
1775-1834

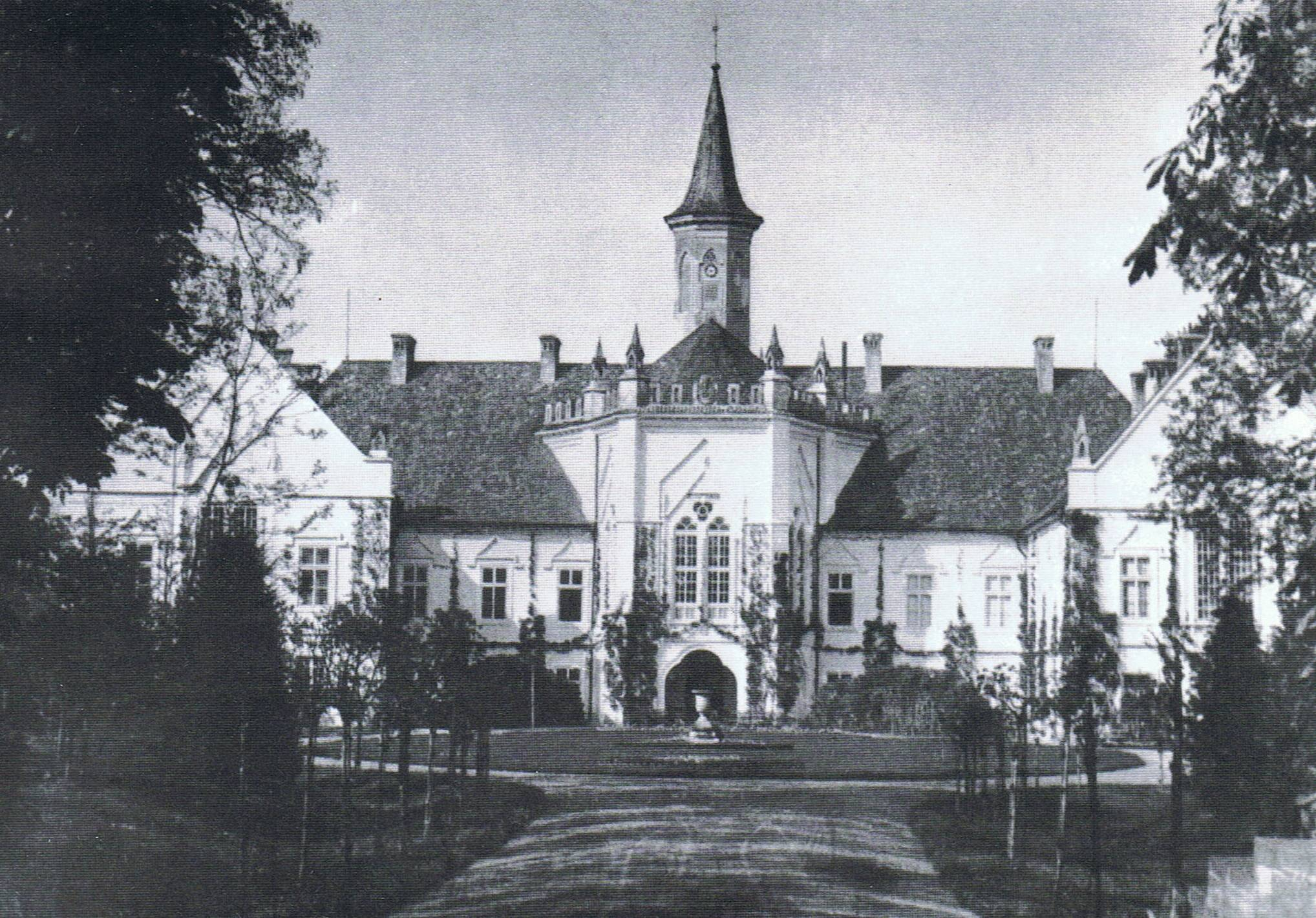
1835-1912

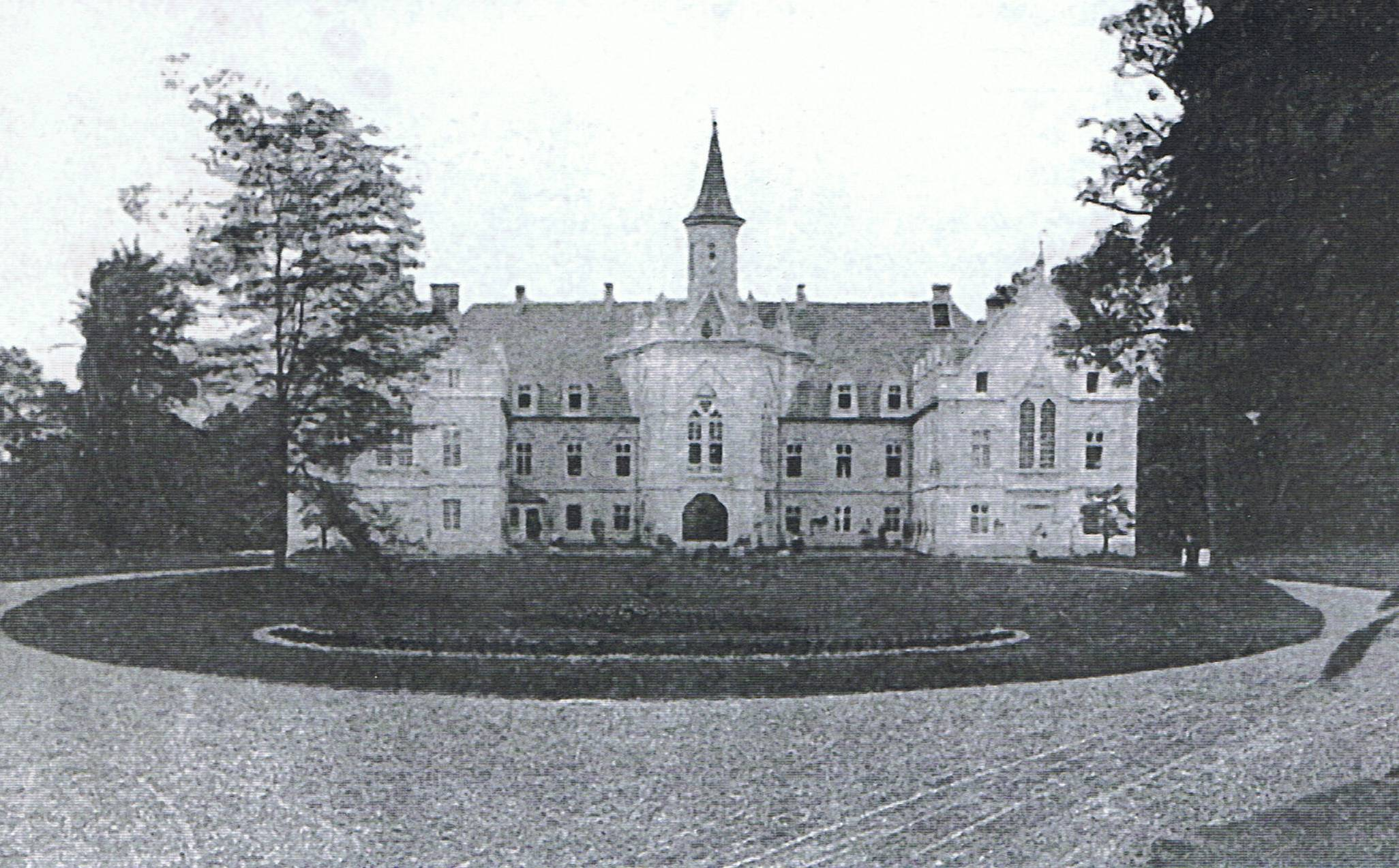
1913 - 1927

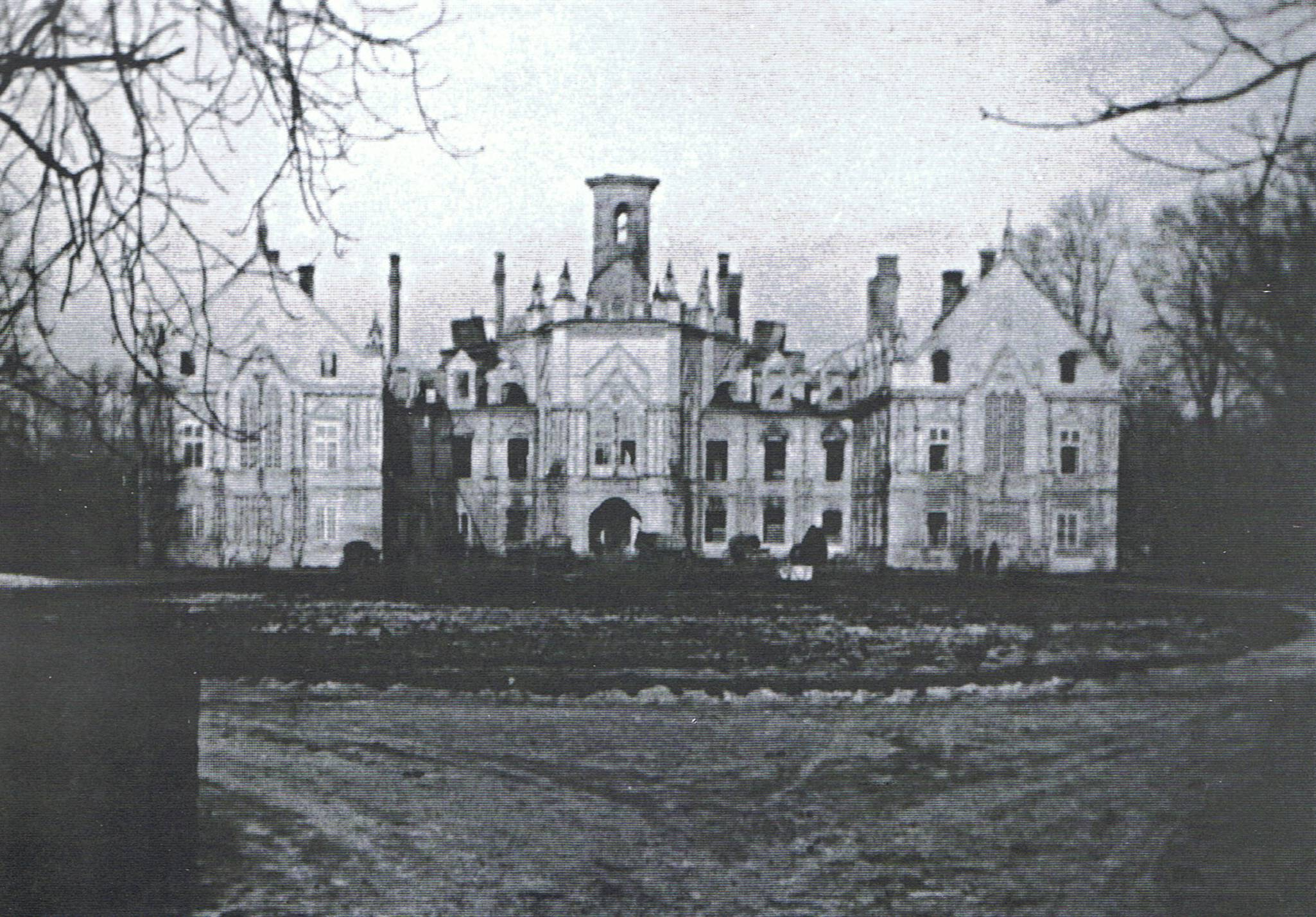
1927

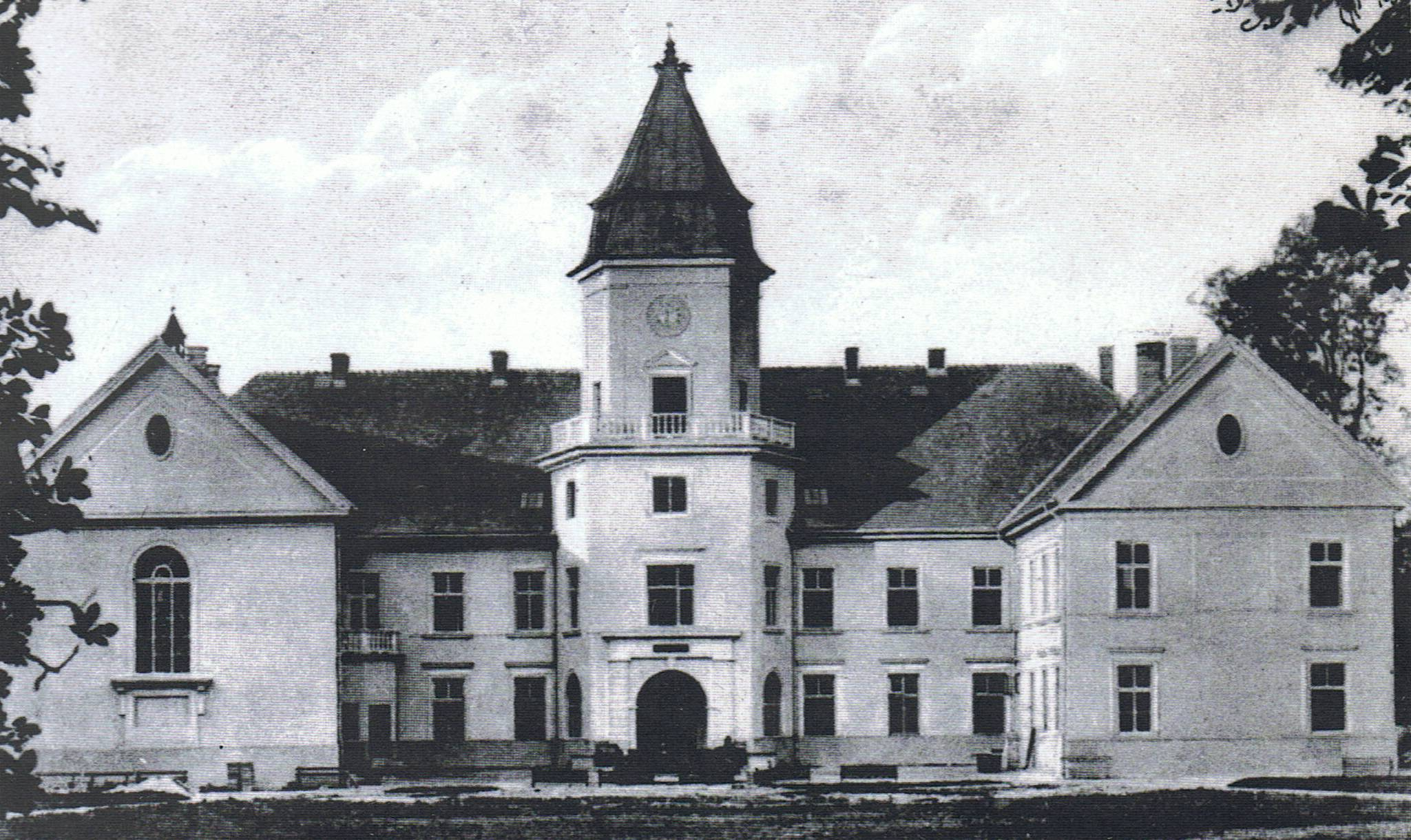
1930

== Gallery ==
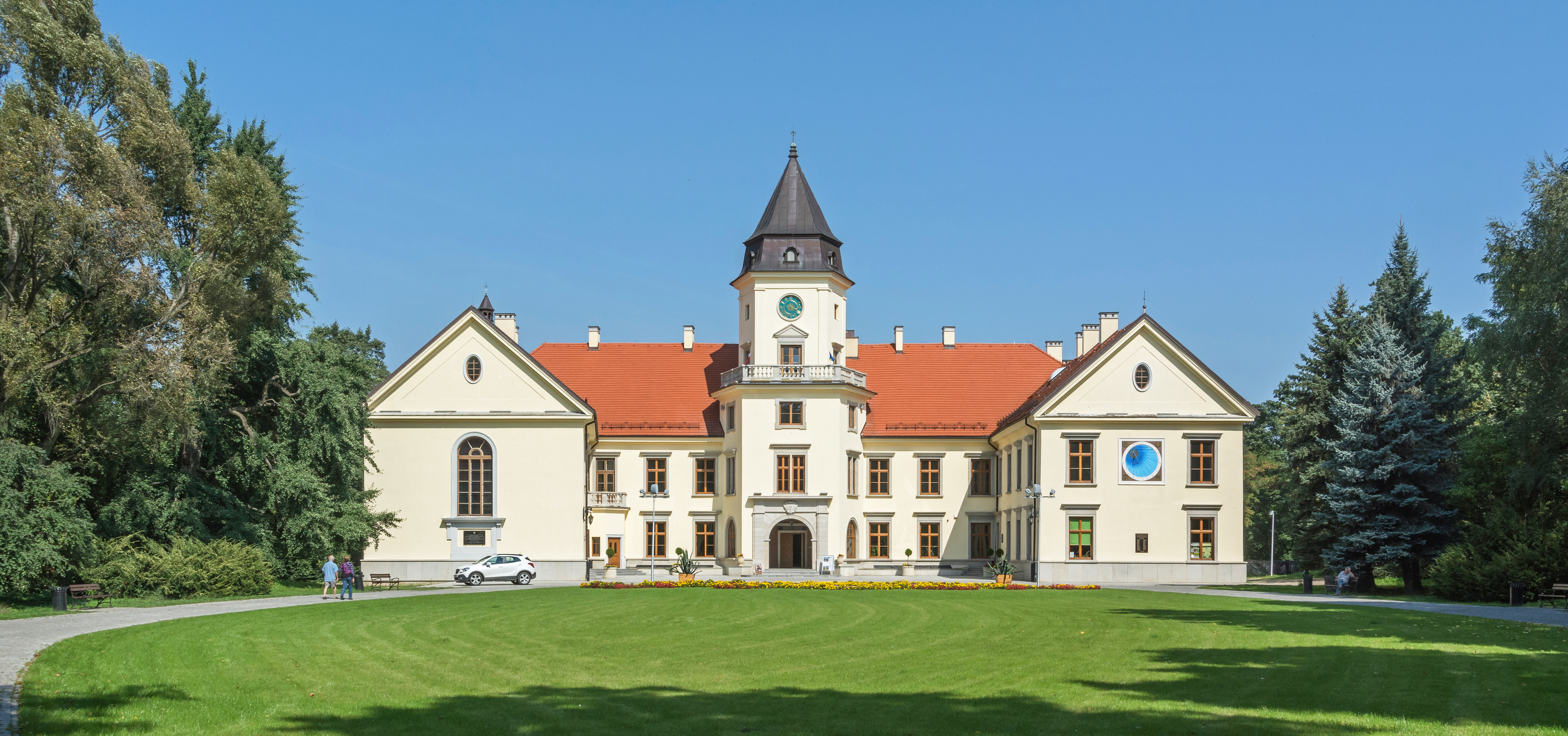
Façade of the castle

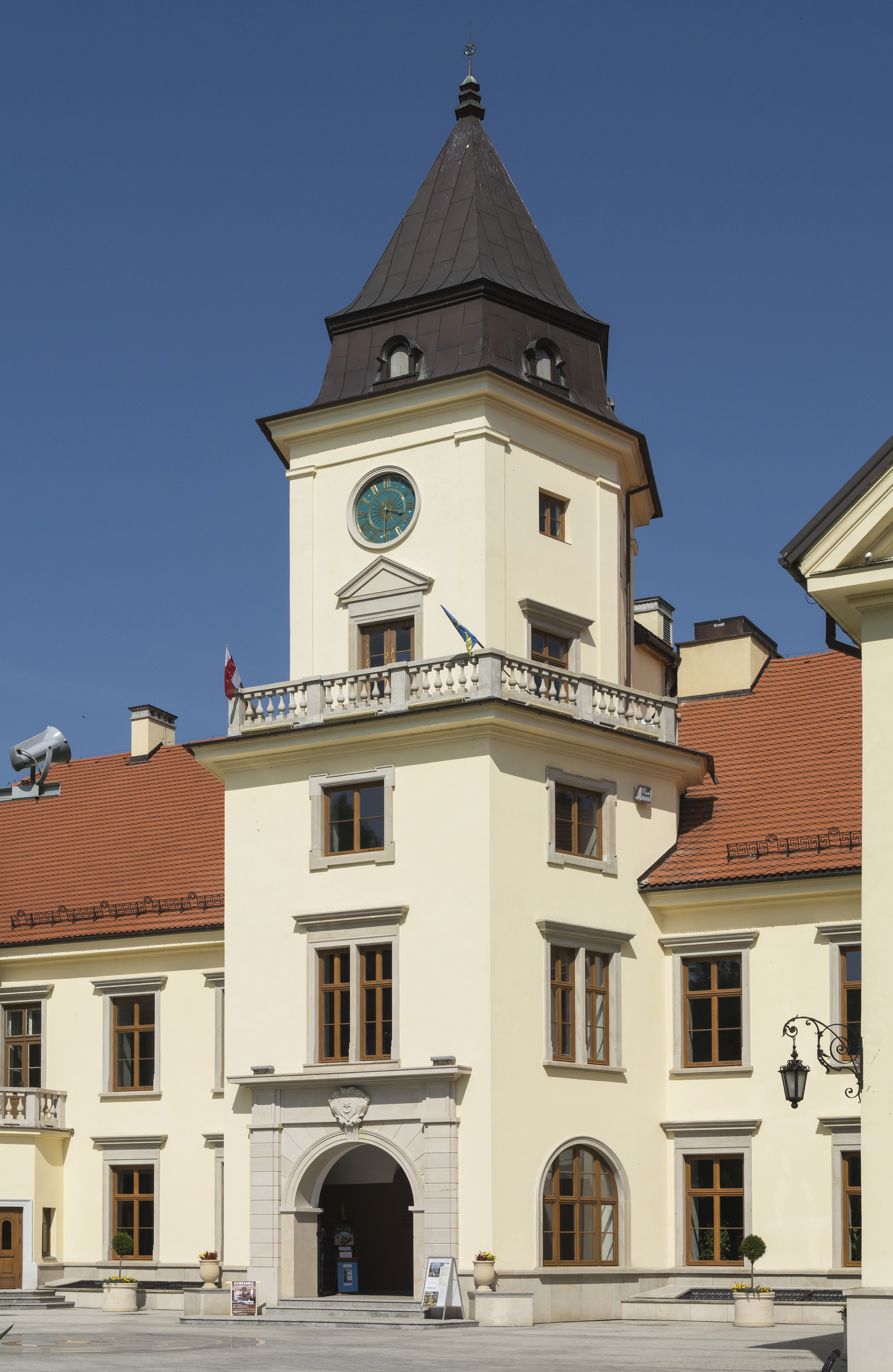
Castle tower

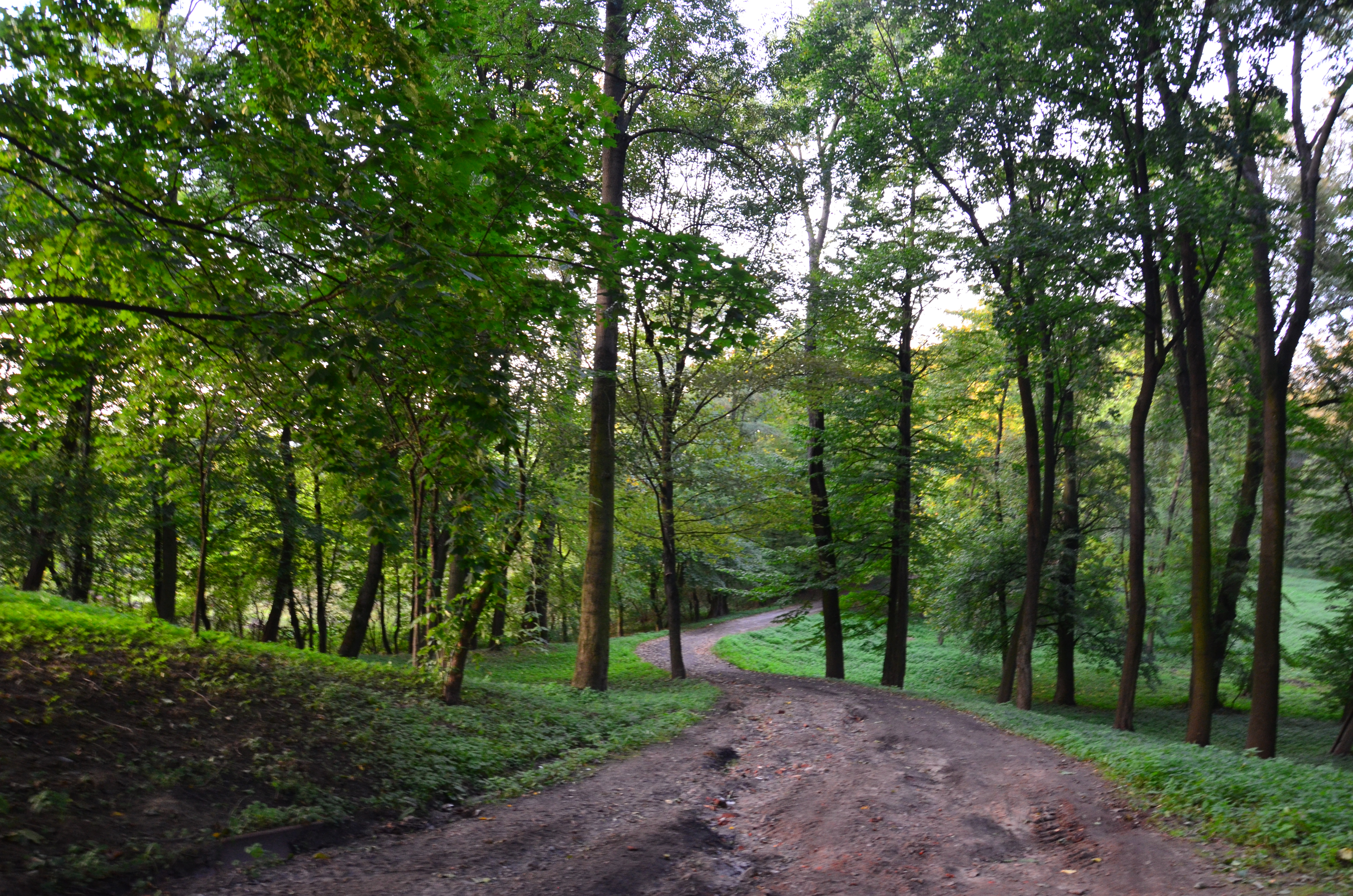
Park near the castle

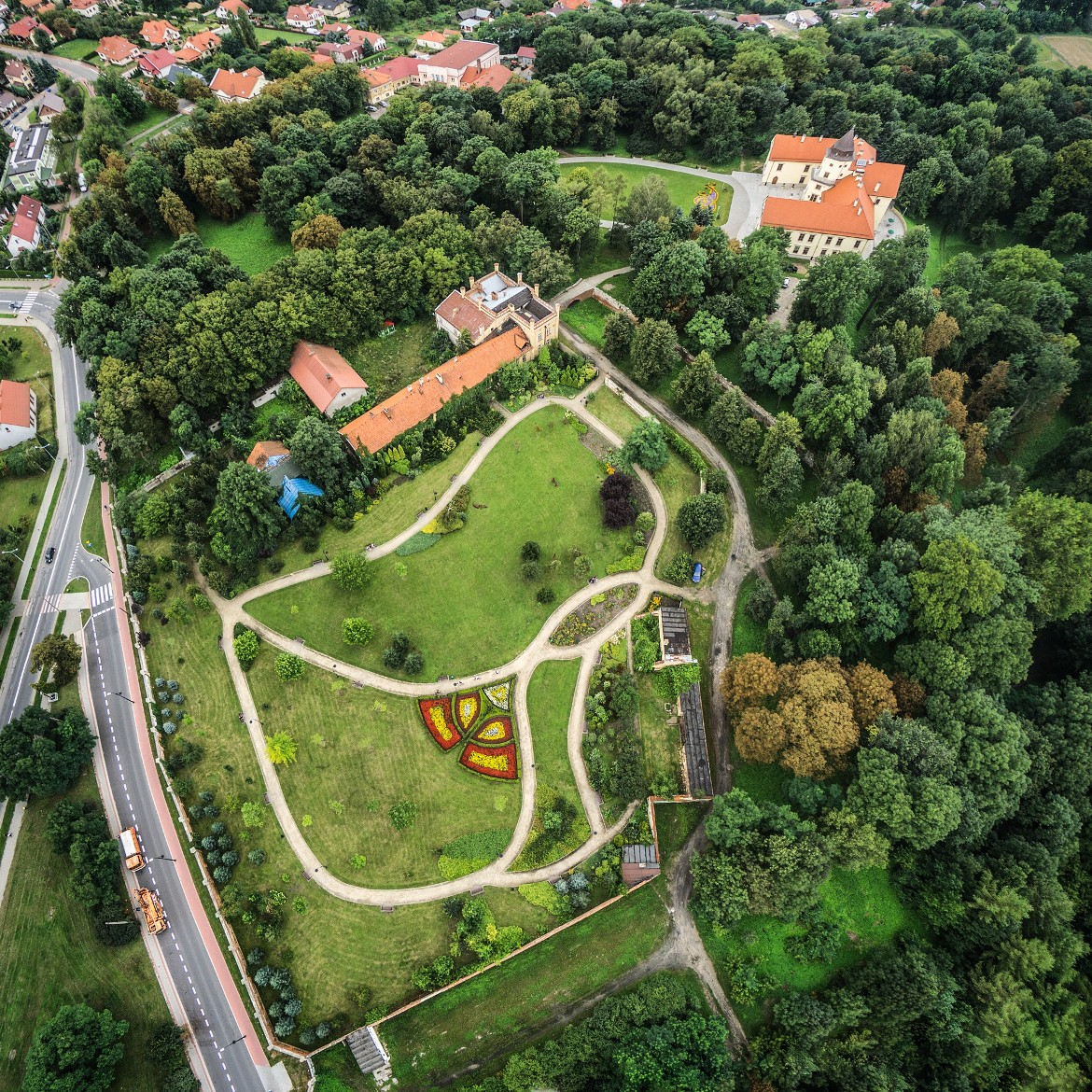
Aerial view of the castle and park in Dzików

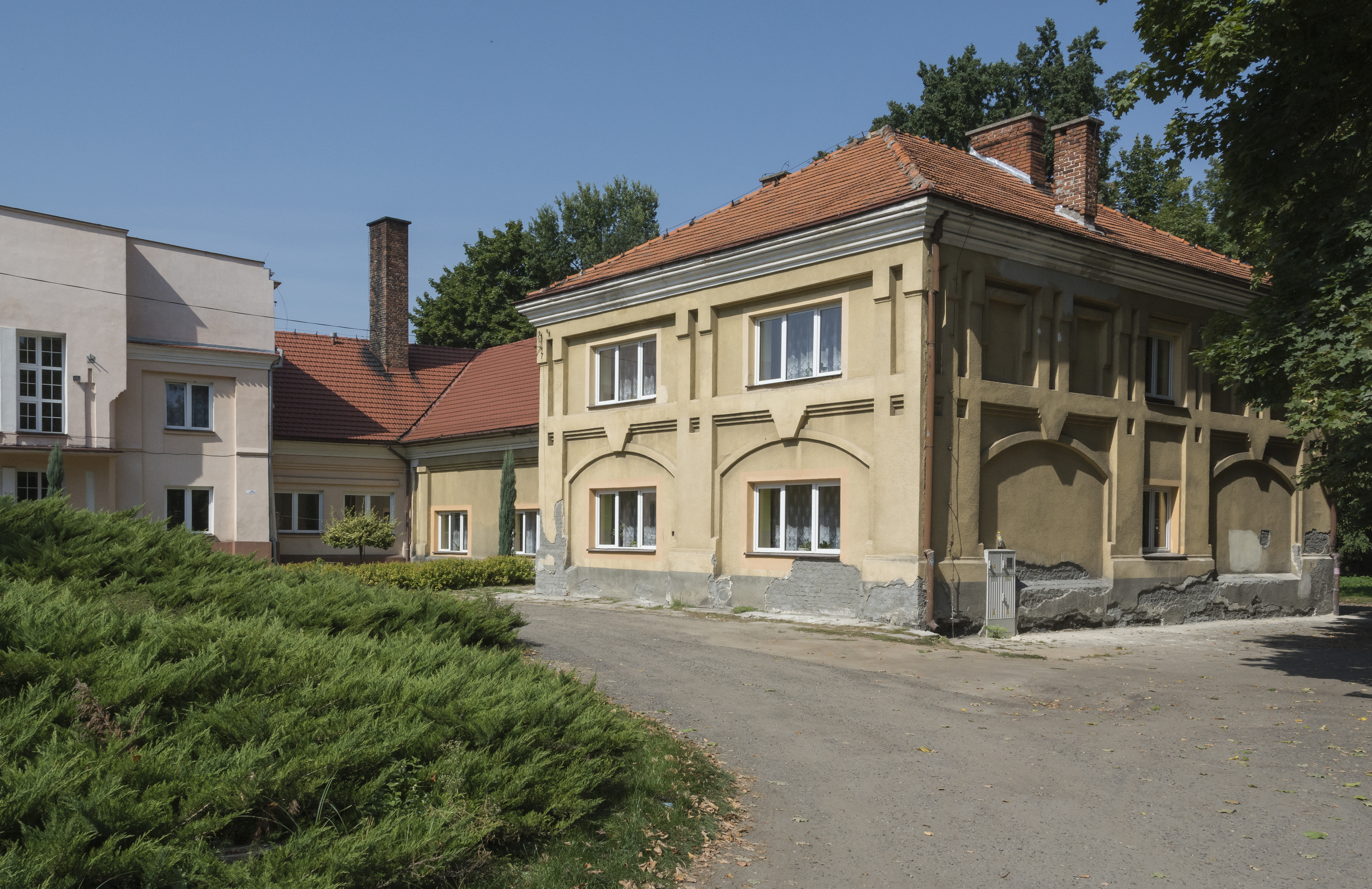
Historic stable

== See also ==
- Castles in Poland
- Dominican Church and Convent of Assumption of Mary in Tarnobrzeg – around 1 km from the Castle
- Church of Our Lady of Perpetual Help in Tarnobrzeg – around 1 km from the Castle
- Tarnowski family

== Bibliography ==
- Janas A., Wójcik A. – Zamek Tarnowskich w Dzikowie
