= Sandomierz Basin =

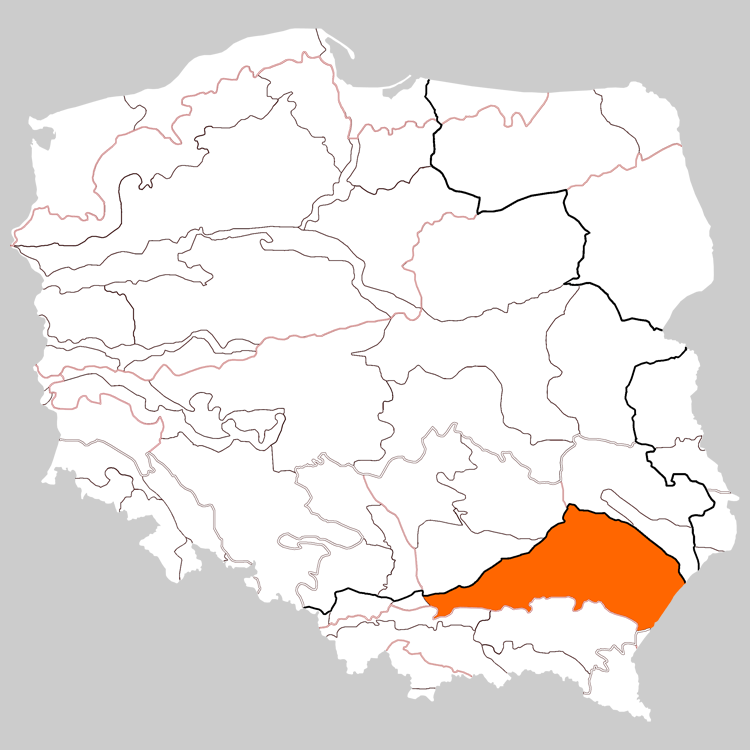
- Interactive map of Sandomierz Basin

Sandomierz Basin (Polish: Kotlina Sandomierska) is a lowland, located in southeastern Poland, between the Lesser Poland Upland, Lublin Upland and the Western Carpathians. Its name comes from the historical city of Sandomierz, and the basin has a triangular shape with the size of around 15,000 km^{2} (5,800 sq mi). It is drained by the Vistula River, as well as its eastern tributary, the San (both rivers make its northern border). Among major cities located in the Sandomierz Basin are Dębica, Jarosław, Mielec, Przemyśl, Przeworsk, Rzeszów, Stalowa Wola, Sandomierz, Tarnobrzeg, and Tarnów.

== Geography ==
Sandomierz Basin lies mostly on the territory of three Polish provinces – Lesser Poland Voivodeship (northeastern corner), Podkarpacie Voivodeship (southwestern corner), and Lublin Voivodeship (northwestern corner). Easternmost part of it is also in Lviv Oblast in Ukraine. It is densely inhabited, with the exception of the Niepołomice Forest and the Sandomierz Forest. The basin is divided into the following geographical subregions:

- Vistula Lowland (Nizina Nadwislanska),
- Bochnia Foothills (Podgorze Bochenskie),
- Tarnów Plateau (Plaskowyz Tarnowski),
- Lower Wisłoka Valley (Dolina Dolnej Wisloki),
- Tarnobrzeg Plain (Rownina Tarnobrzeska)
- Lower San Valley (Dolina Dolnego Sanu)
- Biłgoraj Plain (Rownina Biłgorajska),
- Kolbuszowa Plateau (Plaskowyz Kolbuszowski),
- Tarnogród Plateau (Plaskowyz Tarnogródzki),
- Subcarpathian Urstromtal (Pradolina Podkarpacka)
- Rzeszów Foothills (Podgorze Rzeszowskie).

The basin is rich with natural resources, such as salt (Bochnia, Wieliczka), gypsum, sulphur (Tarnobrzeg), natural gas (Husow, Jarosław) and petroleum. It is crossed by European route E40, along which goes a main west–east rail line from Kraków to Lwów. Average annual temperature in the Vistula river valley is 8 °C, and annually, there are 90 to 100 days with temperatures below freezing (since mid-October until late April). In the winter, there are approximately 2 hours of sunshine a day, while in the summer approximately 5 hours. In the valleys of the Vistula and the Raba there are frequent fogs. Annual precipitation is 800 mm, with snow staying on the ground for 50 to 60 days annually. The climate of Sandomierz Basin is marked by frequent changes.

== Images ==
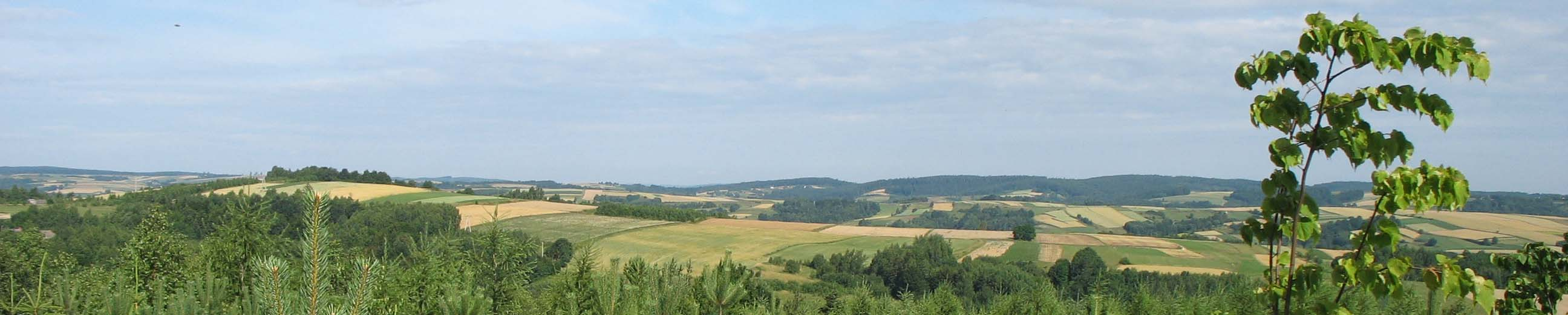
Rzeszów Foothills

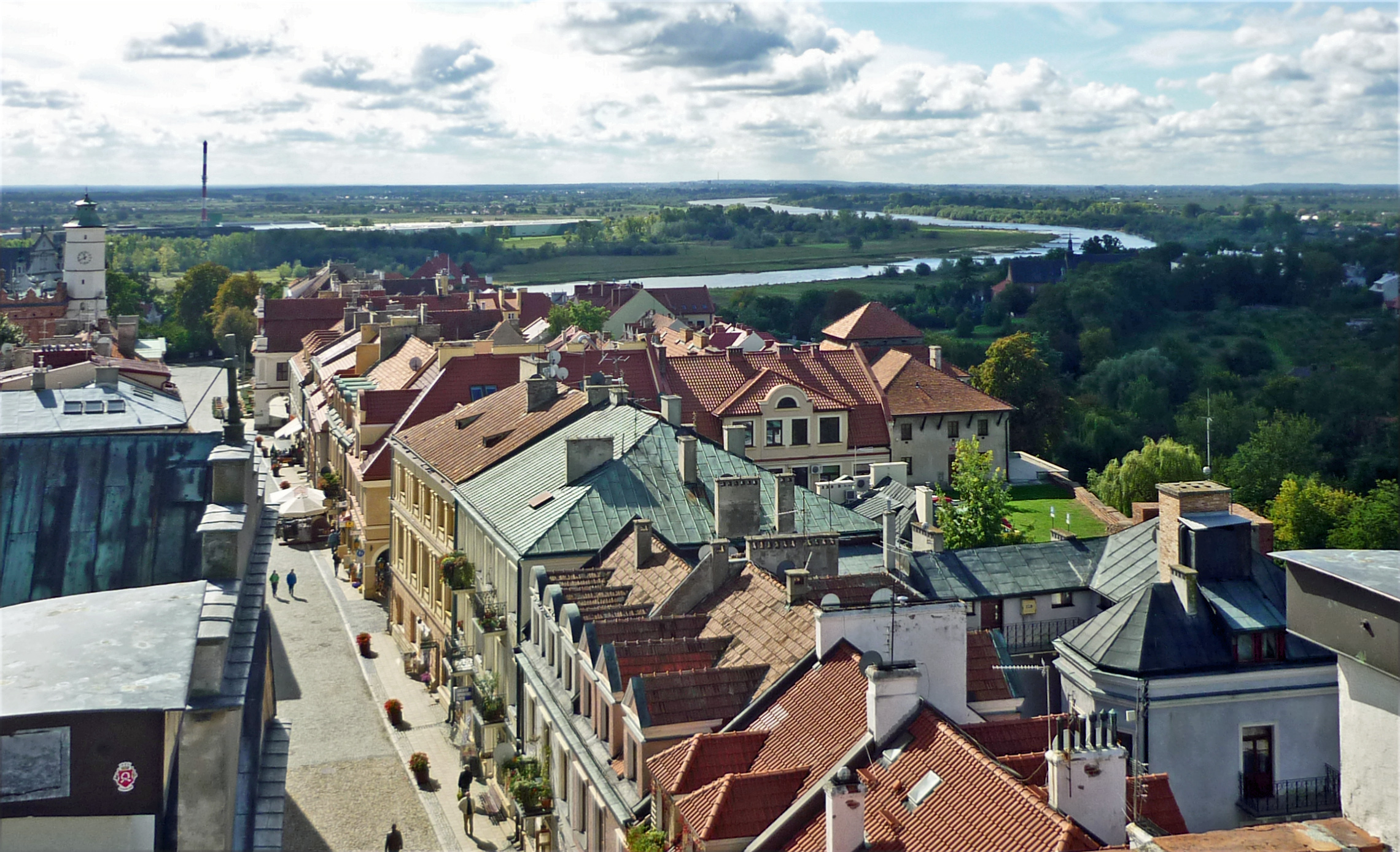
Vistula in Sandomierz

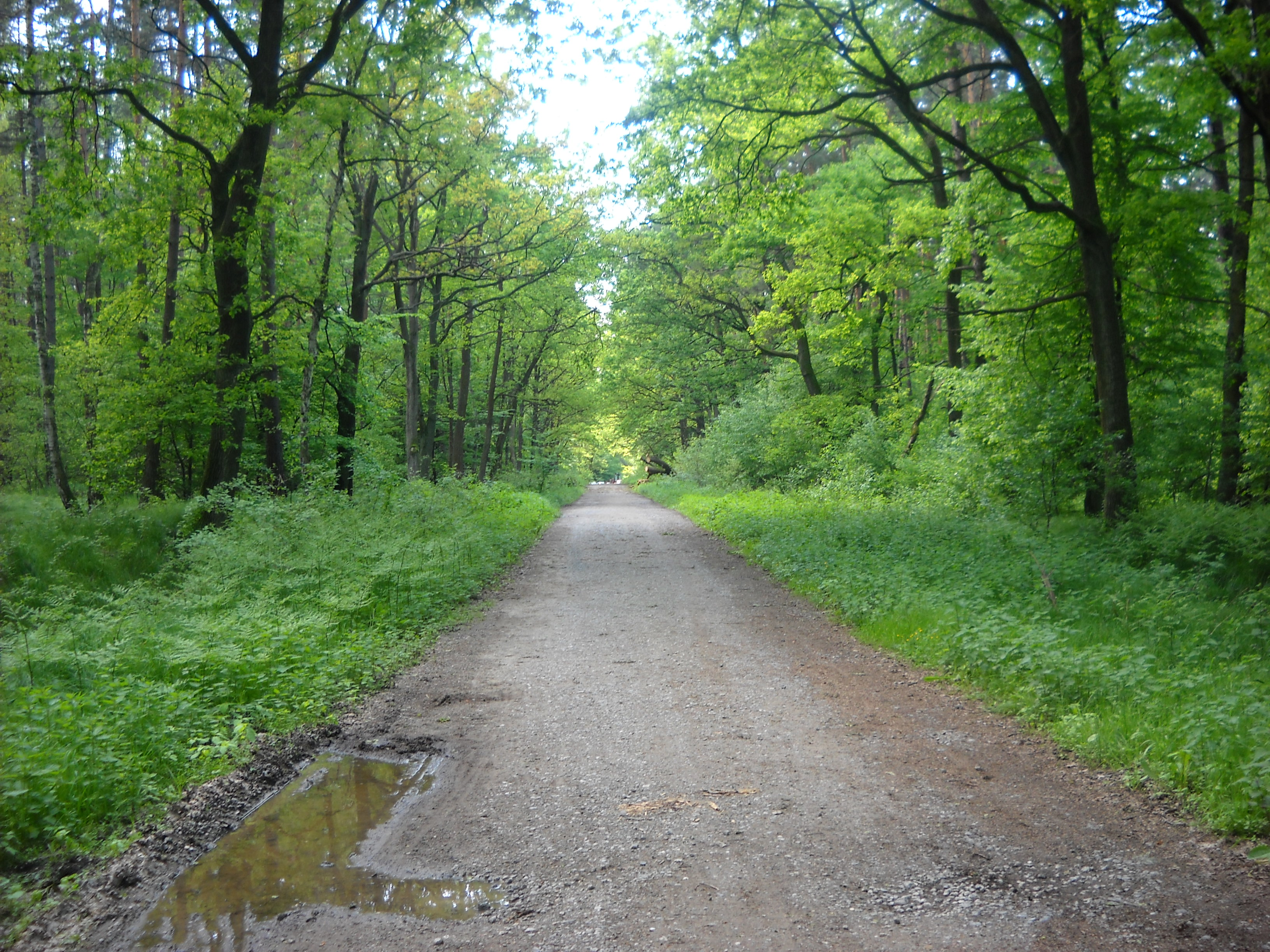
Niepołomice Forest
