= 1310 =

1310 in various calendars
- Gregorian calendar: 1310; MCCCX
- Ab urbe condita: 2063
- Armenian calendar: 759; ԹՎ ՉԾԹ
- Assyrian calendar: 6060
- Balinese saka calendar: 1231–1232
- Bengali calendar: 716–717
- Berber calendar: 2260
- English Regnal year: 3 Edw. 2 – 4 Edw. 2
- Buddhist calendar: 1854
- Burmese calendar: 672
- Byzantine calendar: 6818–6819
- Chinese calendar: 己酉年 (Earth Rooster); 4007 or 3800 — to — 庚戌年 (Metal Dog); 4008 or 3801
- Coptic calendar: 1026–1027
- Discordian calendar: 2476
- Ethiopian calendar: 1302–1303
- Hebrew calendar: 5070–5071
- Hindu calendars
- Vikram Samvat: 1366–1367
- Shaka Samvat: 1231–1232
- Kali Yuga: 4410–4411
- Holocene calendar: 11310
- Igbo calendar: 310–311
- Iranian calendar: 688–689
- Islamic calendar: 709–710
- Japanese calendar: Enkyō 3 (延慶３年)
- Javanese calendar: 1221–1222
- Julian calendar: 1310; MCCCX
- Korean calendar: 3643
- Minguo calendar: 602 before ROC 民前602年
- Nanakshahi calendar: −158
- Thai solar calendar: 1852–1853
- Tibetan calendar: ས་མོ་བྱ་ལོ་ (female Earth-Bird); 1436 or 1055 or 283 — to — ལྕགས་ཕོ་ཁྱི་ལོ་ (male Iron-Dog); 1437 or 1056 or 284

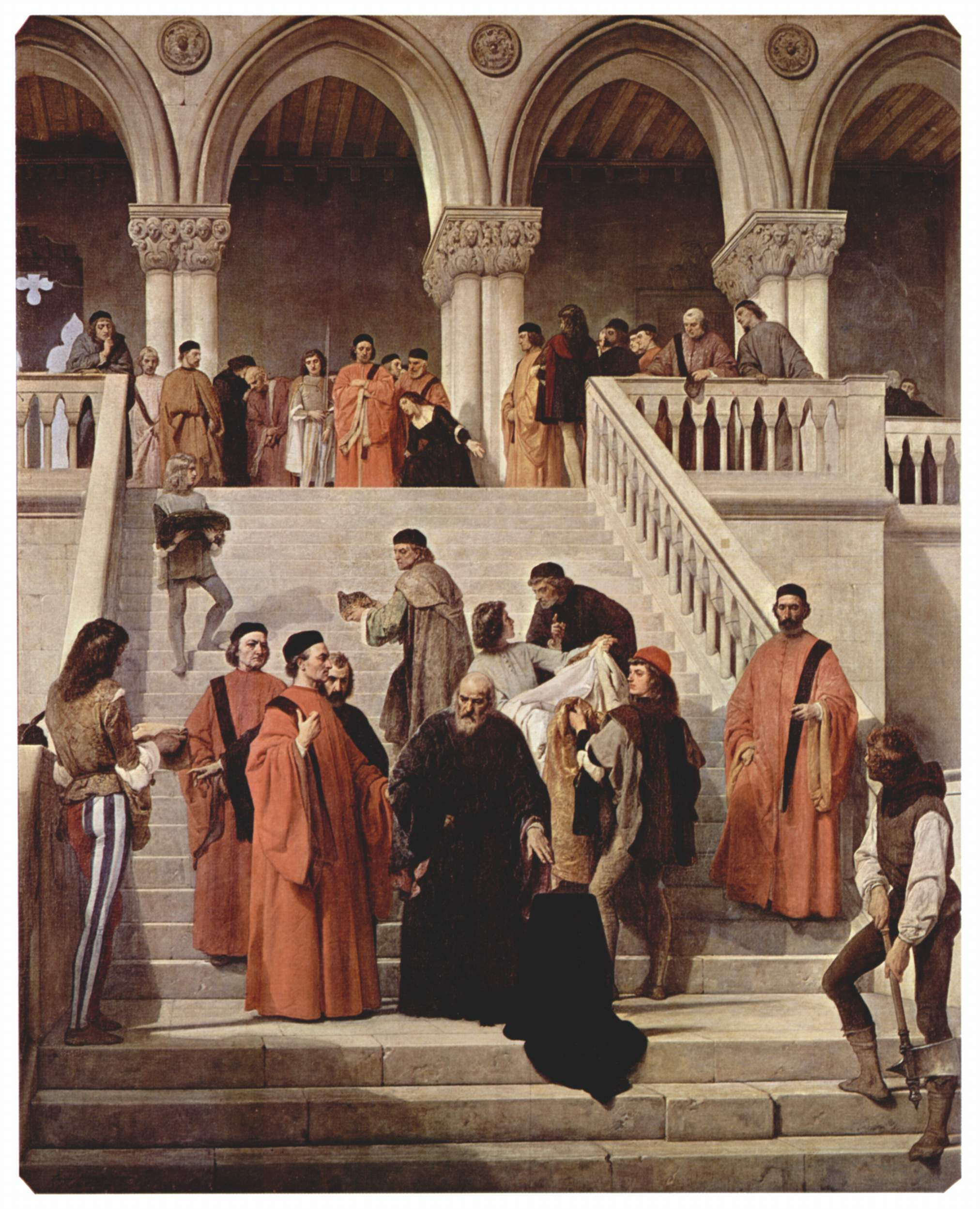
The Council of Ten (or simply "the Ten"), by Francesco Hayez (1867)

Year 1310 (MCCCX) was a common year starting on Thursday of the Julian calendar.

== Events ==
=== January – March ===
- January 19 – General Malik Kafur of the Delhi Sultanate begins the siege of Warangal, capital of the Kakatiya kingdom in what is now the Indian state of Telangana.
- January 26 – James II of Aragon ends the siege of Almeria after five months without taking the city.
- February 8 – The English Parliament opens at Westminster, after being summoned on October 26. The Parliament will continue to meet until April 12.
- February 9 – At Dublin, acting in his capacity as Lord of Ireland, King Edward II of England (as Éadbhard II Shasana, Tiarna Éireann) opens the first session of the Parliament of Ireland during his administration. The Irish Parliament will hold 14 sessions before being dismissed in 1326.
- February 24 – A group of 12 Scottish Catholic bishops, including William Sinclair, Bishop of Dunkeld, swear fealty to Robert the Bruce, King of Scotland.
- March 3 – Konrad I of Oleśnica and his brother Boleslaw, sons and heirs of Henry III, Duke of Głogów renounce their rights to Gdańsk Pomerania (now part of Poland) in return for payment by the principality of Brandenburg, ruled by the Margrave Heinrich I.
- March 5 – Baybars II, Sultan of the Mamluks in Egypt, is driven from office by an angry mob consisting of supporters of his predecessor, An-Nasir Muhammad. Baybars is located and turned over to Sultan Nasir.
- March 20 – Having secured the surrender of King Prataparudra of Kakatiya during the siege of Warangal, General Malik Kafur of the Delhi Sultanate begins his return journey to Delhi. He will arrive on June 23.

=== April – June ===
- April 8 – The return of the Kingdom of Hungary's Crown of Saint Stephen is successfully negotiated at Szeged by Thomas II, Archbishop of Esztergom, along with Amadeus Aba and Dominic II Rátót to secure its return from Ladislaus III Kán, the Voivode of Transylvania.
- April 13 – In Burma, Athinkhaya, one of the three brothers serving as regents of the Kingdom of Myinsaing in present-day central Burma (Myanmar), dies at the age of 49, leaving his brothers Thihathu and Yazathingyan in control. Thihathu will soon be the sole ruler of Burma.
- April 15 – Sultan An-Nasir Muhammad of Egypt has his predecessor, the former Sultan Baybars II, executed.
- May 9 – Nephon I of Constantinople becomes the new Patriarch of the Eastern Orthodox Church in Byzantium, now at Turkey. He is elected after his predecessor, the 80-year-old Athanasius I, is forced to retire.
- May 12 – In France, 54 members of the Knights Templar are burned at the stake for heresy at Paris, on orders of King Philip IV of France (Philip the Fair). Pope Clement V attempts to take control of the situation by issuing a papal bull, to assert the Church's authority over the matter and demands Philip turn over the Templars and their property to ecclesiastical officials, who will then try the Templars for charges themselves. (→ Trials of the Knights Templar)
- May 25 – Otto III, Duke of Carinthia, dies and is succeeded by his younger brother, King Henry of Bohemia, Margrave of Moravia and the nominal King of Poland.
- May 26 – Siege of Algeciras: Castilian forces abandon the siege as King Ferdinand IV of Castile ("Ferdinand the Summoned") sign a seven-year peace treaty with Abu al-Juyush Nasr, Sultan of Granada. Nasr agrees to pay an indemnity of 150,000 gold doblas and an annual tribute of 11,000 doblas to Castile. He yields some frontier towns, including Quesada and Bedmar. In accordance with the terms, Nasr becomes a vassal of Castile and provides up to 3 months of military service per year if summoned. Markets will be opened between Castile and Granada – Ferdinand appoints a "judge of the frontiers" (juez de la frontera) to adjudicate disputes between Christians and Muslims in the border regions.
- June 15 – Tiepolo conspiracy: Leading Venetian nobles led by Bajamonte Tiepolo organise a conspiracy against Doge Pietro Gradenigo. Their plot fails due to treachery and the rebels are defeated near Piazza San Marco by forces faithful to the doge. During their retreat to the San Polo sestiere, the Rialto Bridge is burnt down. Later, Tiepolo surrenders himself and is exiled to Istria. The suppression of the revolt will lead to the creation of the Council of Ten.
- June 23 – General Malik Kafur arrives at Delhi and presents to Sultan Alauddin the treasures captured from Warrangal.

=== July – September ===
- July 1 – The Citadel of Erbil, headquarters of a rebellion by 10,000 Eastern Christians and located in what is now Iraq, is captured after a siege by the Mongol Ilkhanate, and the defenders are massacred.
- July 10 – The Council of Ten (or simply "the Ten"), Il Consiglio dei Dieci is created to govern the Republic of Venice, by decree of Pietro Gradenigo, Doge of Venice. The council, the inner circle of oligarchical patricians, initially investigates the conspiracy of Bajamonte Tiepolo.
- August 27 – The third coronation of Károly Róbert I (Charles I) as King of Hungary is carried out at Székesfehérvár by Thomas II, Archbishop of Esztergom after the Archbishop successfully negotiates the return of the Crown of Saint Stephen from Ladislaus Kán. Use of the Holy Crown had been required by Hungarian law for recognition by the nobles of Hungary.
- September 1 – John of Luxemburg, younger brother of King Henry of Bohemia, marries Princess Elizabeth, the daughter of the late King Wenceslaus II.
- September 20 – King Edward II of England reaches Roxburgh after starting his invasion of the Kingdom of Scotland "in the third week of September". The campaign is fruitless, even though English forces under Piers Gaveston manage to reach as far north as Perth.

=== October – December ===
- October 1 – Writing from Kildrum, King Robert the Bruce of Scotland attempts to establish peace talks with King Edward II of England (who is encamped in Scotland at Biggar) but Edward refuses to negotiate.
- November 23 – Abu Sa'id Uthman II becomes the new Sultan of Morocco upon the death of his nephew, the Sultan Abu al-Rabi Sulayman.
- December 3 – Prague, capital of the Kingdom of Bohemia, is captured and King Henry of Bohemia is deposed by his brother, John of Luxemburg, who will later be known as "John the Blind".
- December 10 – Stephen I, Duke of Bavaria, one of the three brothers ruling the southern German duchy within the Roman Empire, dies, leaving his older brothers Otto III and Louis III as the dual rulers.
- December 11 – In Poland, Henry the Faithful becomes the new duke of Silesia and of much of Wielkopolska ("Greater Poland", now part of northwestern Poland as Henry IV, upon the death of his father, Henry III, Duke of Głogów. Wielkopolska is divided between Henry III's sons, Henry IV, Konrad I of Oleśnica, Bolesław of Oleśnica, John, Duke of Ścinawa and Przemko II, with the Duchy of Glogow given to his wife, Matilda of Brunswick-Lüneburg. Wielkopolska will be conquered in 1314.

=== By place ===
==== Europe ====
- Spring – Castilian forces abandon the siege of Algeciras after six months and begin negotiations with Granada. Ferdinand and Sultan sign a peace treaty for seven years on May 26.
- Summer – Count Charles of Valois founds the Diocese of Corfu, Zakynthos and Cephalonia with its seat in Corfu. It is, comprising the Ionian Islands of Corfu, Zakynthos and Cephalonia.

==== Asia ====
- Spring – Siege of Warangal: Delhi forces led by Malik Kafur conquer the fortress of Warangal after a month-long siege. Rudradeva II, Indian ruler of the Kakatiya Dynasty, negotiates a truce and surrenders a huge amount of wealth to send to the Delhi Sultanate.

=== By topic ===
==== Education ====
- The first purpose-built accommodation for students (the Mob Quad) is completed at Merton College, Oxford, England.

== Births ==
- March 5 – Przecław of Pogorzela, Polish bishop (d. 1376)
- April 30 – Casimir III the Great, king of Poland (d. 1368)
- November 29 – John de Mowbray, English nobleman (d. 1361)
- November 30 – Frederick II, German nobleman (d. 1349)
- Berenguer de Cruïlles, Spanish abbot and bishop (d. 1362)
- Dermot MacCarthy, Irish nobleman and magnate (d. 1367)
- Gil Álvarez Carrillo de Albornoz, Spanish cardinal (d. 1367)
- Guillaume Tirel (or "Taillevent"), French head chef (d. 1395)
- Jean de Beaumanoir, Breton nobleman and knight (d. 1366)
- Margaret I, French noblewoman (House of Capet) (d. 1382)
- Niccolò Acciaioli, Italian nobleman and seneschal (d. 1365)
- Simon Langham, English cardinal and archbishop (d. 1376)
- Urban V, French pope of the Catholic Church (d. 1370)

== Deaths ==
- February 11 – Marguerite d'Oingt, French nun (b. 1240)
- April 10 – Peire Autier, French religious leader (b. 1245)
- April 13 – Athinkhaya, Burmese ruler and regent (b. 1261)
- April 15 – Baybars II, Egyptian ruler and regent (b. 1250)
- April 26 – Constance of Montcada, French noblewoman
- May 20 – John de Moels, English nobleman and knight
- May 22 – Humilitas of Vallombrosa, Italian nun (b. 1226)
- May 25 – Otto III, Austrian nobleman (House of Gorizia)
- June 1 – Marguerite Porete, French mystic and author
- June 5 – Amalric of Tyre, Cypriot prince and statesman
- October 1 – Beatrice of Burgundy, French noblewoman
- October 14 – Blanche of Anjou, consort of King James II of Aragon
- October 28 – Athanasius I, Byzantine patriarch (b. 1230)
- November 23 – Abu al-Rabi Sulayman, Moroccan ruler
- December 10 – Stephen I, German nobleman (b. 1271)
- unknown dates
  - Abu al-Barakat al-Nasafi, Syrian scholar and theologian
  - Alexander MacDougall, Scottish nobleman and magnate
  - Constantine I, co-ruler of Cilician Armenia (b. 1278)
  - Dai Biaoyuan, Chinese littérateur, poet and writer (b. 1244)
  - Diego López V de Haro, Spanish nobleman and knight
  - Erik Eriksøn ("Eric Longlegs"), Danish nobleman and co-ruler
  - Gao Kegong (or "Fang Shan"), Chinese painter (b. 1248)
  - Geoffrey I, Luxemburgian nobleman (House of Vianden)
  - George Pachymeres, Byzantine historian and theologian
  - Henry II Kőszegi, Hungarian nobleman and knight
  - John de Soules, Scottish nobleman (House of de Soules)
  - Robert FitzRoger, English nobleman and knight (b. 1247)
  - Tommaso degli Stefani, Italian painter and artist (b. 1231)
