= Henry III, Duke of Głogów =

Duke of Glogow (1274-1310)

Henry III
- Duke of Głogów
- Born: 1251/60
- Died: 11 December 1310
- Noble family: Silesian Piasts of Głogów
- Spouse: Mathilda
- Issue: Henry IV the Faithful; Konrad I of Oleśnica; Bolesław of Oleśnica; Agnes; Jan of Ścinawa; Katharina; Przemko II of Głogów; Salome; Hedwig; Beatrice
- Father: Konrad I, Duke of Głogów
- Mother: Salome of Greater Poland

Henry III of Głogów (Polish: Henryk; 1251/60 – 11 December 1310) was a duke of Głogów from 1274 to his death and also duke of parts of Greater Poland during 1306–1310.

He was one of the sons (probably the second) of Konrad I, Duke of Głogów, by his first wife Salome, daughter of Duke Władysław of Greater Poland.

== Life ==
=== Early years ===
Little is known about his first years of life. In 1267 Henry III participated in the canonization of his great-grandmother Hedwig of Andechs. At the time of his father's death in 1274 he and his brothers are still minors; for this, his step-mother Sophie of Landsberg (widow of his father) and the Chancellor Mikołaj took their guardianship. Shortly after, they sold the towns of Bolesławiec and Nowogrodziec to the Archbishop of Magdeburg.

=== Beginning of cooperation with Henry II Probus ===
The first participation of Henry III in the political arena was in 1277, when together with Przemysł II of Greater Poland he took part in an armed expedition against his uncle Bolesław II the Bald. The trip was provoked by the attitude of the Duke of Legnica, who, in order to obtain territorial concessions, kidnapped the young Henry IV and imprisoned him in his castle of Legnica. Henry III and the Bohemian King Ottokar II formed a coalition of Silesian Princes to help the prisoner Duke. However, they were defeated in the Battle of Stolec on 24 April 1277. At the head of the Legnica troops came the son and heir of Bolesław II, Henry V the Fat. It was probably here that the conflicts between him and Henry V began, which later caused great suffering to the Duke of Legnica.

=== Fall of King Ottokar II and Division of the Duchy of Głogów ===
One year later Henry III participated in the great Battle on the Marchfeld (26 August 1278), where King Ottokar II was defeated and killed. In the same year Henry III was forced to make a division of his lands between his brothers: he retained the main cities of the Duchy —Głogów, Bytom Odrzański and Kożuchów—; Konrad II the Hunchback obtained Ścinawa and Przemko received Żagań and Nowogród Bobrzański; soon after Konrad II went to study in Bologna, and Henry IV Probus took his lands in his name; with this, the ruler of Wroclaw showed his intentions to stretch his sovereignty over all the other Głogów princes and Silesian rulers.

=== Influence of Henry IV Probus over Silesia ===
In 1281 Henry III, together with Henry V the Fat and Przemysł II of Greater Poland were invited by Henry IV Probus to a meeting in Sądowel. The Duke of Wrocław broke the law of hospitality and captured the three Dukes. Henry IV released them only after they recognized his overlordship. Although the agreement was concluded under duress, it has stood the test of time and in the next few years, we see Henry III, together with his brother Przemko II among the close associates of the Duke of Wroclaw in his great political ecclesiastical conflict Thomas II, bishop of Wroclaw. His loyalty to Henry IV Probus caused that the ruler of Głogów would be excommunicated twice. It was only after the death of Henry IV that Henry III's relations with the clergy returned to normality.

=== Henry IV's death and execution of his will ===
The close cooperation between Henry III and Henryk IV Probus was evident when in Krosno Odrzańskie on 11 January 1288 Henry III was knighted by the Duke of Wrocław. The major proof of the subjugation of the Duke of Glogów was after the death of his brother Przemko on 26 February 1289: his Duchy of Ścinawa was annexed by Henry IV without any protest of Henry III. However, one year later, on 23 June 1290, Henry IV Probus died suddenly, probably poisoned, an event which seriously affected the further career of the Duke of Glogów. In his will, the dying Duke of Wrocław left Henry III as his main heir. However, the Wrocław knights and burghers had other plans and one month later (mid-July 1290) they forced Henry I to escape. As their new ruler, the rebels invited Duke Henry V the Fat of Legnica to take the government. The reasons for the Wrocław revolt were unknown, but maybe the harsh rule of Henry III was a decisive factor. In any event, Henry III refused to accept this and immediately declared war on Henry V.

=== War against Henry V the Fat ===
Shortly after taking control over Wrocław, Henry V the Fat forced the Duke of Głogów to renounce all his pretensions over the disputed territories of Chojnów, Boleslawiec, Gościszów, Nowogrodziec, Ścinawa, Wińsko, Syców, Uraz, Trzebnica, Milicz and Sądowel. However, Henry III managed to recover Ścinawa soon after.

Both sides quickly began to find allies who would support them in the war. Henry III made a treaty with the House of Wettin, strengthening this alliance by marrying the daughter of Duke Albert I of Brunswick-Lüneburg, Matilda (March 1291). Further allies were Otto IV, Margrave of Brandenburg-Stendal and Przemysł II of Greater Poland. With the latter Henry III entered into an arrangement under which if Przemysł II died without male issue, the Duke of Głogów would inherit his lands. In the meanwhile, Henry V the Fat obtained the support of King Wenceslaus II of Bohemia.

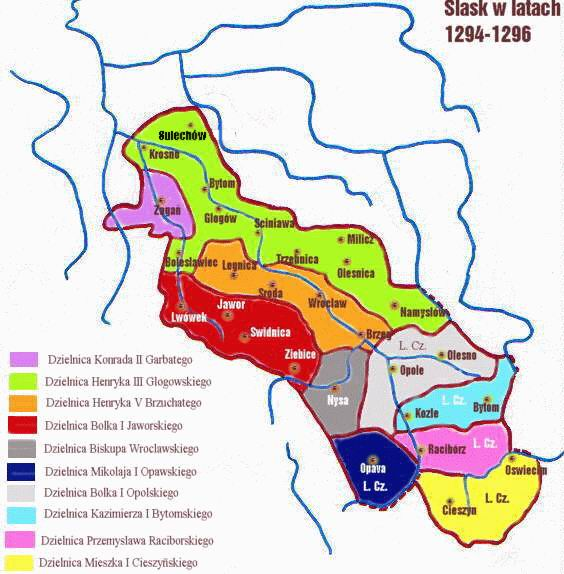
Duchy of Głogów under Henry III (in green) on the map of Silesia in 1294-1296

Henry V's rule over Wrocław was extremely conservative and clashed with some political opponents among the nobility. One of them, Pakosław Zdzieszyca, was sentenced to death accused of murder. The revenge of Pakosław's son Lutka, was impressive: on 11 November 1293 he captured Henry V and gave him to Henry I, who put him in an iron cage for almost six months. Henry V only obtained his freedom after surrendering the towns of Namysłów, Bierutów, Oleśnica, Kluczbork, Byczyna, Wołczyn, Olesno, Chojnów and Bolesławiec (almost 1/3 of Henry IV's lands) with their respectives fortresses to Henry III, paying of a ransom of 30,000 pieces of silver and promising to assist the Duke of Głogów for the next five years in all his wars.

=== Death of Przemysł II and the succession over Greater Poland ===
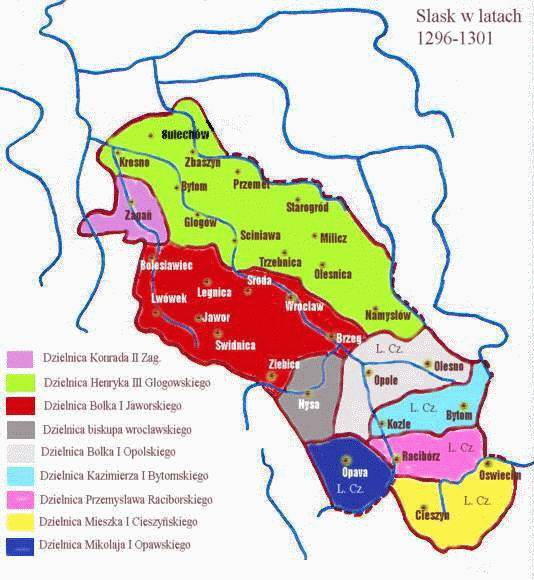
Duchy of Głogów under Henry III (in green) on the map of Silesia in 1296-1301

On 8 February 1296 the Duke of Greater Poland and since 1295 King of Poland Przemysł II was murdered. The Greater Poland-Głogów alliance collapsed around 1293, when Przemysł II attacked Duke Władysław I the Elbow-high of Kuyavia. Because of this, the Greater Poland nobility chose Władysław I to succeed Przemysł II in Poznań, despite the claims of Henry III, who considered that the treaty signed with Przemysł II in 1290 was still valid and in consequence, he was his sole heir (Przemysł II married three times but only left one daughter from his second marriage, Richeza).

Henry III and Władysław I quickly concluded a settlement on 10 March 1296 in Krzywin, under which the Duke of Głogów obtained all the lands from the south of the Obra River. At the same time Władysław I designated Henry III's eldest son, Henry IV the Faithful as his heir over Poznań, and, in case of his death without male issue, over all Greater Poland.

=== War against Bolko I the Strict ===
The reason Henry III gave large concessions to Władysław I in the treaty of 1296 was that he was already defeated by Bolko I the Strict, Duke of Jawor. When Henry III stayed in Krzywin, Bolko I took Chojnów and Boleslawiec. Through the mediation of King Wenceslaus II of Bohemia, a settlement was made on Zwanowice in March 1297; the Duke of Głogów managed to make a truce with the Duke of Jawor, but was forced to renounce the above-mentioned districts.

=== Relations with King Wenceslaus II of Bohemia ===
At the end of the 1290s Henry III could improve his relations with the King Wenceslaus II of Bohemia (for example, he was present in Prague on Wenceslaus II's coronation in 1297), but also his relations with Władysław I the Elbow-high deteriorated, and at the end a war broke out. In June 1298, in Kościan (and despite the opposition of the Greater Poland nobility with the Bishop of Poznan Andrzej Zaremba at their head) Henry III and Władysław I signed a new treaty, under which in return for confirmation of the church and the inclusion in a future "Kingdom" of the functions of Chancellor, Henry III promised assistance to Władysław I in order to complete the total subjection of Greater Poland, Gdańsk Pomerania and in this way he could obtain the Royal crown. The conflict between the Piast Dukes was used by King Wenceslaus II. In the village of Klęka on 23 August 1299 an agreement was concluded under which Henry III was forced to abandon his pretentions over all Greater Poland for good.

=== Disputes with Bishop Jan Romka and Konrad II the Hunchback ===
Henry III accepted immediately the intervention of the Bohemian King, because he was busy in his own duchy with his disputes with the Bishop of Wroclaw Jan Romka. The conflict was caused by the Duchy of Żagań, which, previously belonging to his younger brother Konrad II the Hunchback, was taken by Henry III in March 1299 when Konrad II was chosen as Patriarch of Aquileia. But when Konrad II returned to Żagań, Henryk III didn't want to return the Duchy to him, which was under his rule during his absence. Even after the intervention of the vassals and the Church, Henry III refused to give Konrad II his Duchy. Bishop Jan Romka excommunicated him and supported the requests of Konrad II. The fight with the church was resolved only on 24 April 1300 confirming the victory of the Bishop and the restitution of Żagań to Konrad II.

=== Increase of Henry III's power. Adoption of the title "Heir of the Kingdom of Poland" ===
The Duke of Glogów didn't have any intention of resigning his pretentions over the Greater Poland inheritance, as was evidenced in 1301, when he adopted the title: "Heir of the Polish Kingdom, Duke of Silesia, Głogów and Poznań" (Polish: "dziedzic Królestwa Polskiego, książę Śląska, pan Głogowa i Poznania"). This soon caused an armed conflict with the King of Bohemia and now of Poland Wenceslaus II. The danger around Henry III increased especially after 1301, when the Bohemian King took over the custody of the children of Henry V the Fat, this after the death on 9 November 1301 of their uncle Bolko I the Strict. Despite the delicate situation the war never occurred, because Wenceslaus II was busy in his attempts to obtain the Hungarian crown for his son. The death of Wenceslaus II in 1305 and the murder of his son and successor Wenceslaus III the following year favored the opportunities of Henry III over his pretentions in Greater Poland. The death of his brother Konrad II on 11 October 1304 further facilitated Henry III's situation, because he could annex his Duchy of Żagań without inconvenience and also reunified the whole Duchy of Głogów under his rule.

=== Claims over Greater Poland. Acquisition of parts from Przemysł II's inheritance ===
In the spring of 1306 Henry III was able to advance over the Greater Poland-Kuyavia borderline (Konin) and Gdańsk Pomerania, forcing Władysław I the Elbow-high to retreat. Kalisz resisted the pretentions of the Duke of Głogów, but he was able to master it in 1307 from his current ruler, Duke Bolesław III the Generous (the eldest son of Henry V the Fat), who also had a claim over the whole succession of Wenceslaus (as the husband of her youngest daughter Margareta); eventually, all Greater Poland was taken by the Duke of Głogów. Soon Henry III and the new King of Bohemia Henry of Carinthia formed an alliance against Bolesław III's ambitious plans.

=== Internal politics ===
In the internal politics, Henry III could maintain his Duchy far away from the wars where he was constantly involved, and in consequence, the economy improved and with this the prestige and wealth of Głogów increased. Henry III also introduced administrative and monetary reforms which affected not only the townspeople but also his own court and the nobility. Also, he founded more than a dozen urban centers (like Góra, Wąsosz, Polkowice, Twardogóra, Sulechów, Zielona Góra, Lubin, Przemęt and Kościan).

In his relations with the Church, Henry III was a generous benefactor. During his rule several monasteries and parish churches were founded. The Duke of Głogów also patron of many artists, which is reflected in the building of the tombstones of Henry IV Probus, Bolesław I the Tall, his brothers and parents, in the Głogów Kolegiata and Przemysł II in Poznan Cathedral.

=== Death and succession ===
Henry III died on 11 December 1310 and was buried in the Cistercian Church of Lubiąż. His five sons: Henry IV, Konrad I, Jan, Boleslaw and Przemko II, soon split between them the inheritance of his father and led to the decline of the Duchy. Moreover, this political fragmentation, visible especially in the Greater Poland region, scared the local nobility, who thought that maybe they risked losing their positions. In the end, Władysław I the Elbow-high was able to conquer all Greater Poland in 1314.

== Marriage and Children ==
In March 1291, Henry III married Matilda (born 1276 – died 26 April 1318), daughter of Albert I, Duke of Brunswick-Lüneburg. They had:

1. Henry IV the Faithful (born 1291-93 – died 22 January 1342).
2. Konrad I (born c. 1292-94 – died 22 December 1366).
3. Bolesław (born c. 1295 – died January–March 1321).
4. Agnes (born 1293-96 – died 25 December 1361), married firstly on 18 May 1309 to Otto III, Duke of Bavaria and secondly in 1329 to Alram, Count of Hals.
5. Salome (born c. 1297 – died before 9 December 1309).
6. Jan (born c. 1296-1300 – died 23.4.1361-19.5.1365).
7. Katharina (born c. 1300-05 – died 5 December 1323/1326), married firstly bef. 24 March 1317 to John V, Margrave of Brandenburg-Salzwedel and secondly by September 1317 to John III, Count of Holstein-Plön.
8. Przemko II (born 1300-08 – died 11 January 1331).
9. Hedwig (born c. 1308 – died before December 1309).

In his will, Henry III left Glogów to his wife as her dower, which she ruled until her own death.

== Notes ==
Henry III, Duke of Głogów House of Piast Born: c. 1251–1260 Died: 3 December 1309
Preceded by Konrad I	Duke of Glogów; 1274–1309	Succeeded by Matilda
Preceded by Henry V the Fat	Duke of Ścinawa; 1290–1309	Succeeded by Henry IV the Faithful; Konrad I Bolesław; Jan; Przemko II
Preceded by Henry V the Fat	Duke of Oleśnica; 1294–1309	Succeeded by Henry IV the Faithful; Konrad I Bolesław; Jan; Przemko II
Preceded by Henry V the Fat	Duke of Namysłów; 1294–1309	Succeeded by Henry IV the Faithful; Konrad I Bolesław; Jan; Przemko II
Preceded by Konrad II the Hunchback	Duke of Żagań; 1304–1309	Succeeded by Henry IV the Faithful; Konrad I Bolesław; Jan; Przemko II
Preceded by Wenceslaus II of Bohemia	Duke of Greater Poland; 1305–1309	Succeeded by Henry IV the Faithful
Preceded by Wenceslaus II of Bohemia	Duke of Poznań; 1305–1309	Succeeded by Henry IV the Faithful; Konrad I Bolesław; Jan; Przemko II
Preceded by Wenceslaus II of Bohemia	Duke of Gniezno; 1305–1309	Succeeded by Henry IV the Faithful; Konrad I Bolesław; Jan; Przemko II
Preceded by Wenceslaus II of Bohemia	Duke of Kalisz; 1305–1306	Succeeded by Bolesław III the Generous
Preceded by Bolesław III the Generous	Duke of Kalisz; 1307–1309	Succeeded by Henry IV the Faithful; Konrad I Bolesław; Jan; Przemko II
