= Władysław I Łokietek =

King of Poland from 1320 to 1333

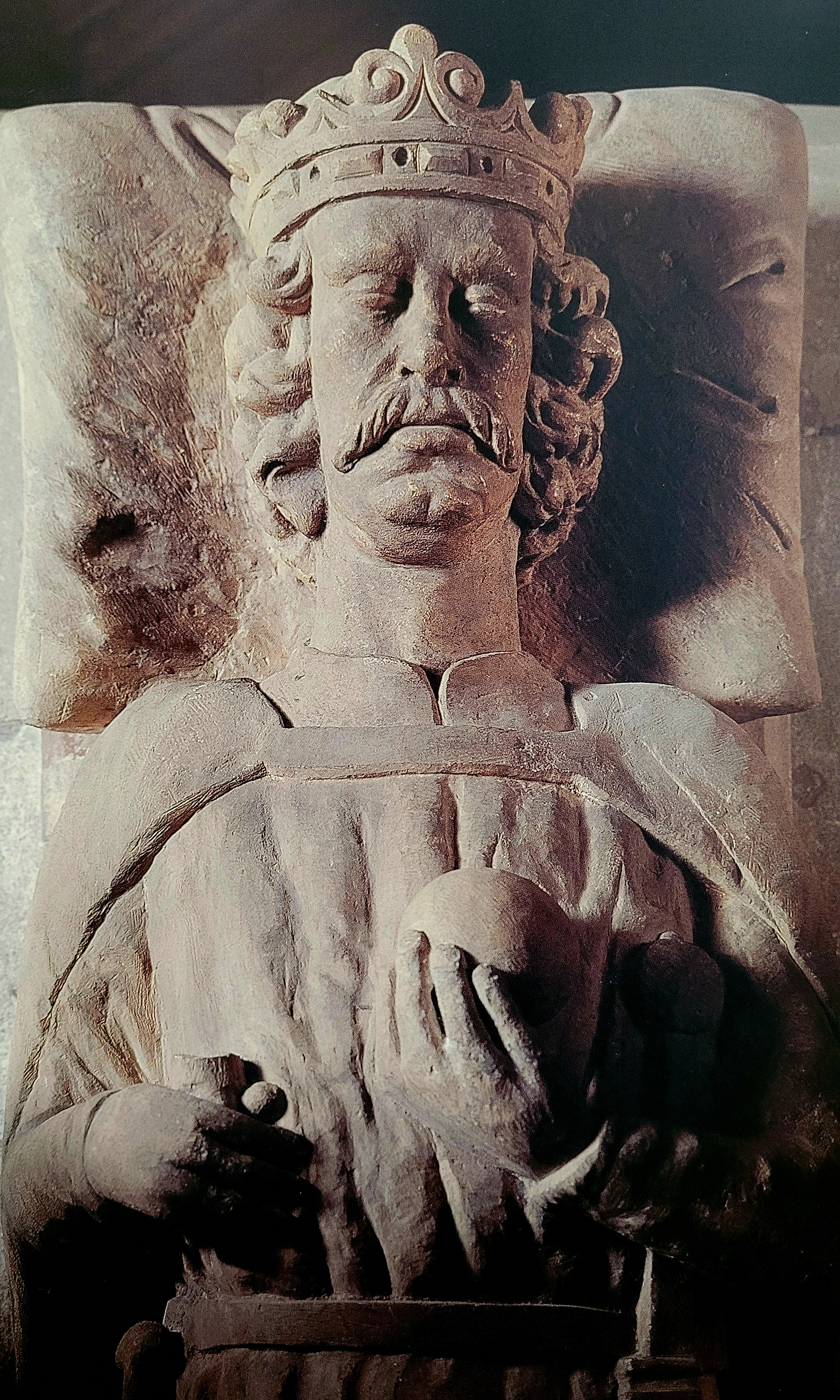
- Władysław's tomb effigy in Wawel Cathedral

King of Poland
- Reign: 1320 – 1333
- Coronation: 20 January 1320
- Predecessor: Wenceslaus III
- Successor: Casimir III the Great
- Born: c. 1260/1261
- Died: 2 March 1333 (aged 72); Kraków, Poland
- Burial: Wawel Cathedral, Kraków
- Spouse: Jadwiga of Kalisz
- Issue: Kunigunde, Duchess of Świdnica; Elizabeth, Queen of Hungary; Casimir III of Poland
- House: House of Piast
- Father: Casimir I of Kuyavia
- Mother: Euphrosyne of Opole

Władysław I Łokietek, in English known as the "Elbow-high" or Ladislaus the Short (c. 1260/1261 – 2 March 1333), was King of Poland from 1320 to 1333, and duke of several of the provinces and principalities in the preceding years. He was a member of the royal Piast dynasty, the son of Duke Casimir I of Kuyavia, and great-grandson of High-Duke Casimir II the Just.

Władysław I inherited a small portion of his father's domain, but his dominion grew as some of his brothers died young. He unsuccessfully tried to incorporate the Duchy of Kraków (the Seniorate Province) in 1289, following the death of his half-brother Leszek II the Black and the withdrawal from contention of his ally Bolesław II of Masovia. After a period in exile during the rule of Wenceslaus II, Władysław regained several duchies and then Kraków in 1306 when Wenceslaus III of Bohemia was murdered. He temporarily took control of part of Greater Poland after the death of his ally Przemysł II, lost it, and then regained it.

Władysław was a skilled military leader, but also an administrator; he conquered Gdańsk Pomerania, and left it to familial governors. For the defense of this territory, he turned to the Teutonic Knights, who then demanded an exorbitant sum, or the land itself as an alternative. This led to an extended conflict with the Knights.

Perhaps his greatest achievement was gaining papal permission to be crowned king of Poland in 1320, which occurred for the first time at Wawel Cathedral in Kraków. Władysław died in 1333 and was succeeded by his son, Casimir III the Great.

== Life ==
=== Background ===
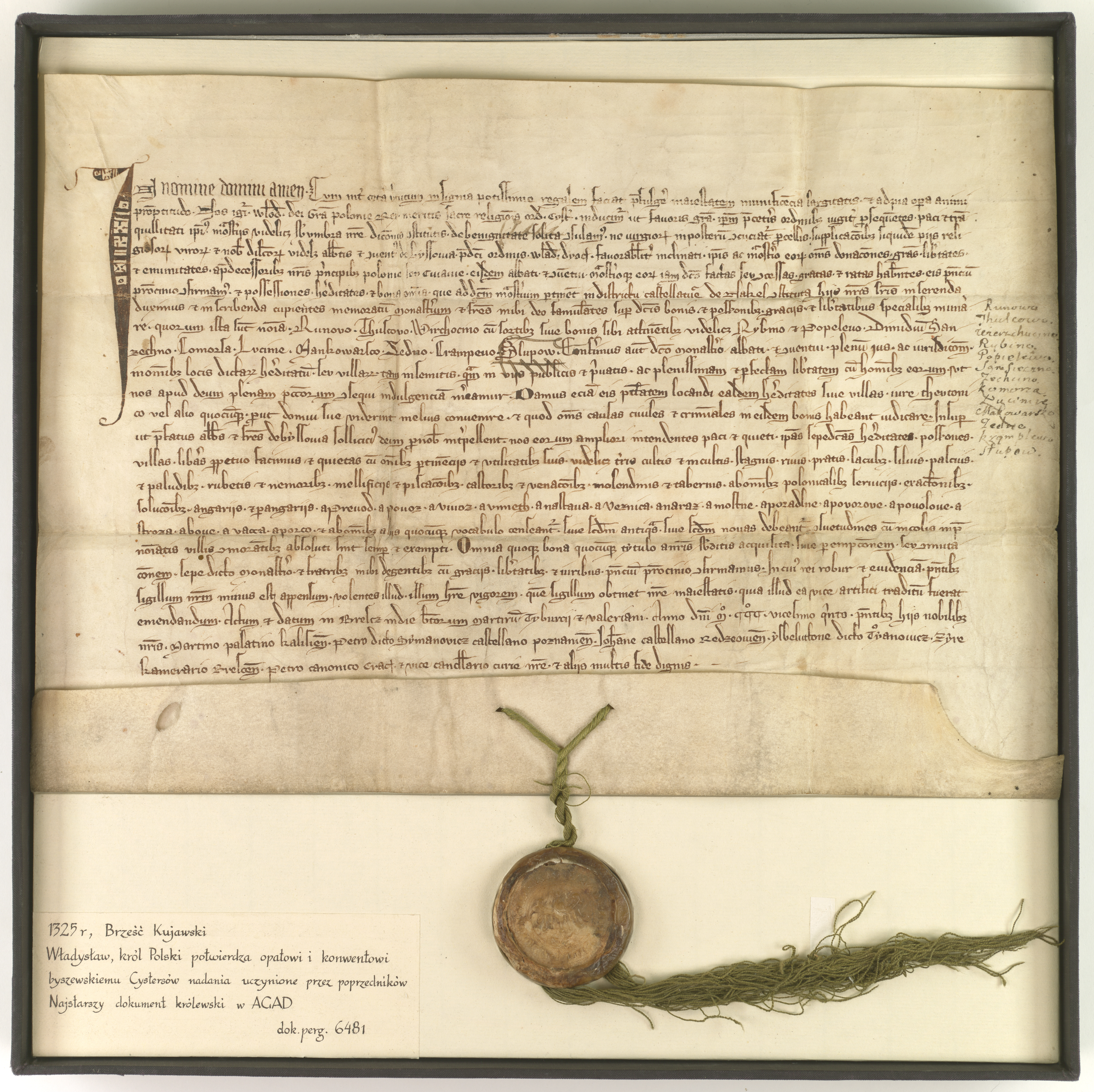
Edict by Władysław I Łokietek in 1325 confirming the Cistercians of Byszewo continue to have the same rights as under German law and the continued ownership of their Abbey in Byszewo.

In 1138, the Kingdom of Poland, which had been growing in strength under the rule of the Piast dynasty, encountered an obstacle that impeded its development for nearly two hundred years. In the will of Prince Bolesław III Wrymouth (Bolesław III Krzywousty), Poland was divided into five provinces: Silesia, Mazovia with eastern Kuyavia, Greater Poland, the Sandomierz Region, and the Seniorate Province. The Seniorate Province initially comprised Kraków and western Lesser Poland, eastern Greater Poland including Gniezno and Kalisz, western Kuyavia, Łęczyca and Sieradz (maintained by the Dowager Duchess Salomea of Berg for her lifetime), and with Pomerelia as a fiefdom. To prevent his four sons from quarreling, Bolesław granted one province to each of them, while the Seniorate Province was to be given to the eldest brother on the grounds of primogeniture. This decision was meant to forestall dynastic feuds and prevent the disintegration of the kingdom. However, it proved inadequate, and began nearly two centuries of what it had sought to counteract: constant fighting and disorder. Władysław I succeeded in re-uniting most of these lands back into the kingdom of Poland.

Władysław I Łokietek was the oldest son of Casimir I of Kuyavia (Kazimierz I Kujawski) and his third wife Euphrosyne of Opole. He was only third in seniority to be Duke of Kuyavia, however, as he had two older half-brothers from Casimir's second marriage to Constance of Wrocław: Leszek II the Black (Leszek Czarny) and Ziemomysł of Kuyavia. He was named after his uncle, his mother's brother Vladislaus I of Opole.

In contemporary historical sources he was nicknamed Łokietek, a diminutive of the word łokieć which means "elbow" or "ell" (a medieval unit of measure similar to a cubit, as in "elbow-high"). (Note: In old Polish, an ell was a measure of length: one ell equaled 0.78 meters in length.) However, the origin and the intended meaning of the nickname are not certain. The earliest explanation appeared in a 15th-century chronicle by Jan Długosz, who speculated that the nickname referred to the short stature of the king. In 2019, a team of archeologists endoscopically reached the interior of the king's tomb and found that the body was laid at the bottom of the burial chamber without a coffin. Subsequently, they were able to determine that Władysław I was 152-155 cm (5'0″-5'1″) tall, which meant that the king's height was just below that of an average person living in Europe during the Middle Ages. In the past, some historians hypothesised that the nickname Łokietek had nothing to do with the physical appearance of prince Władysław, but contemptuously described the actual size and political importance of his hereditary domain among the other principalities ruled by the members of the House of Piast, at least as compared to Łokietek's exaggerated ambitions. If this hypothesis is correct, Władysław Łokietek should be rather translated into English as Władysław the Petty. Historian Andrzej Nowak has speculated that Jan Długosz, who was born almost a century after Łokietek's death, may have misunderstood the political context and consequently misinterpreted the nickname

=== Prince in Kuyavia (1267–1288) ===
In 1267, when Władysław I Łokietek was seven years old, his father Casimir died. At this time, Leszek II the Black inherited Łęczyca (he had already been given Sieradz six years earlier), Ziemomysł gained Inowrocław, and Brześć Kujawski and Dobrzyń were held in regency by Euphrosyne on behalf of Władysław and his younger brothers Casimir II and Siemowit. After the death of his father, Władysław was sent to Kraków to the court of his relative, Bolesław V the Chaste (1st cousin once removed). In 1273, Władysław participated in the arbitration by Bolesław the Pious, duke of Greater Poland, to reconcile him and his mother Euphrosyne with the Teutonic Knights. Władysław took responsibility for governing these territories in 1275, but they were actually held in a "niedzial" (collective property of the family community) with his two younger brothers.

In October 1277, lands destined for his younger brother Casimir II were invaded by Lithuanians, who, after the abduction of prisoners and seizure of loot, freely returned home. This was a result of being the proteges of Bolesław V the Chaste, who at this time was in the opposite political camp (proczeskim) from Konrad II, Duke of Masovia, through whose land the Lithuanian invasion passed. Two years later, in 1279, Władysław I Łokietek was considered to be one of the contenders to succeed in Lesser Poland after the death of Bolesław V the Chaste, according to the Hypatian Codex. However, the nobility abided by Boleslaw's will, which had designated Władysław's elder half-brother Leszek II the Black as his heir.

After Leszek II the Black's acquisition of power in Kraków and Sandomierz in 1279, Władysław, along with his younger brothers, recognized Leszek's sovereignty. This resulted in, among other things, the adoption of a coat of arms by all of the sons of Casimir I Kujawski: half-lion, half-eagle, and afterwards Władysław always served as an ally to his older half-brother. In 1280, Władysław militarily helped Leszek's ally, the Masovian Prince Bolesław II, in a battle with Bolesław's brother, Konrad II, and during the expedition won the castle of Jazdów. It is also possible that at a meeting between Leszek II the Black and Przemysł II, Duke of Greater Poland, in Sieradz in February 1284, the marriage of Władysław to Jadwiga, a cousin of Przemysł, was discussed. The following year, in August, Władysław was present, along with Przemysl II and Ziemomysł of Kuyavia, when finalising the reform of the Sulejów monastery, i.e., taking in the monks from the Wąchock monastic buildings. After this event, Władysław again appeared in Masovia, where he supported Bolesław II in combat with Konrad II, probably on behalf of Leszek II the Black. In retaliation for this action, Konrad II once again let the Lithuanian army pass through his land, which in 1287 besieged Dobrzyń.

=== Death of Leszek II the Black and the struggle for control of Kraków (1288–1289) ===
On 30 September 1288, Leszek II the Black, Duke of Kraków and Sieradz, died without issue, thus transferring power in the principality of Sieradz to his eldest half-brother, Władysław I Łokietek (his full brother Ziemomysł had already died in 1287). While Władysław now ruled over Brześć Kujawski and Sieradz, Casimir II inherited the duchy of Łęczyca, and Siemowit assumed control of the land of Dobrzyń.

The death of Leszek initiated a struggle for supremacy in the duchies of Kraków and Sandomierz; the main candidates were Bolesław II of Masovia, and Henry Probus, Duke of Wrocław. In this contest, Władysław decided to support the former. Henry Probus, using the support of the powerful German patricians, mastered the capital city at the end of 1288. Bolesław II did not give up, however, and aided by support from Władysław, Władysław's brother Casimir II of Łęczyca, and perhaps troops from Przemysł II, he attacked branches of the Probus coalition — Henry III of Głogów, Bolko I of Opole, and Przemko of Ścinawa — who were returning to Silesia. On 26 February 1289, a bloody battle occurred on the fields near Siewierz (Przemko of Ścinawa died there), resulting in a great victory for the branches of Mazovia-Kuyavia.

=== Duke of Sandomierz and war with Wenceslaus II (1289–1292) ===
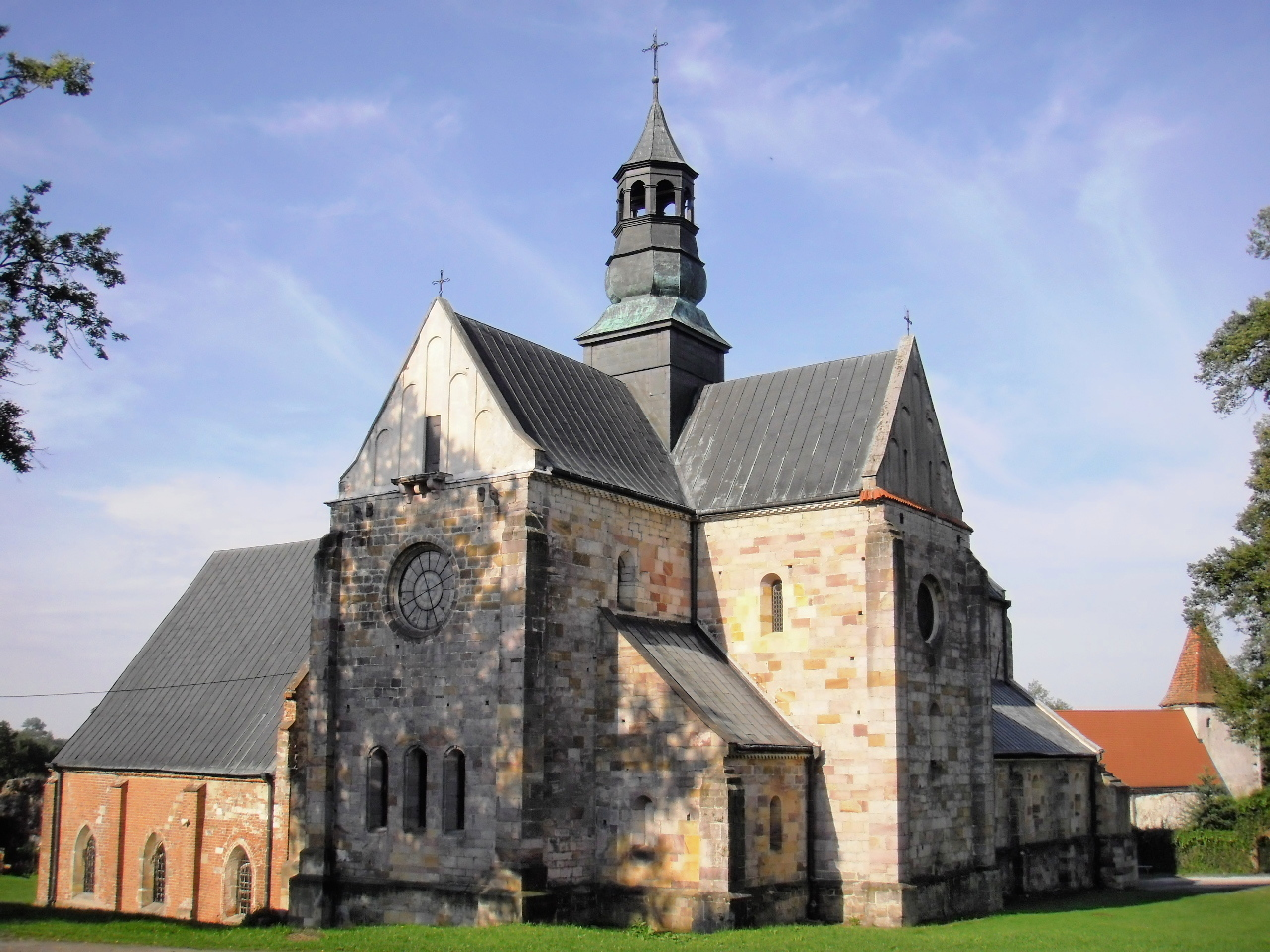
Sulejów Abbey is the place where the decision was made to send a letter to the Pope asking for the coronation of Władysław

After the Battle of Siewierz, Bolesław II of Masovia resigned from applying for the Seniorate Province for unknown reasons, and so Władysław I Łokietek began to style himself the Duke of Kraków and Sandomierz. He occupied the capital of Lesser Poland (but without Wawel Castle), yet despite initial victories in the battles of Skała and Święcica, Władysław could not make it permanent. Soon Kraków was acquired by Henry Probus, and Władysław had to escape the city with the help of the Franciscans. In the second half of 1289, the Kujavian prince managed to consolidate his rule in the Duchy of Sandomierz. This resulted in a division of Lesser Poland back into the two distinct principalities (Kraków and Sandomierz), as they had been ruled by the same duke since Bolesław V the Chaste became High Duke in 1243.

On 23 June 1290, Henry Probus died, and Przemysł II, Duke of Greater Poland, assumed the throne of Kraków. It is not known exactly how the relationship was between Przemysł II and Władysław I Łokietek, although it is very likely that they were friendly, as the division took place without bloodshed and may have been the result of a settlement between the princes. It is possible, however, that these relations could have been cool, and perhaps even hostile. Przemysł II mastered Wawel Castle without problems, but from the beginning he faced considerable internal opposition from within the principality of Kraków – some of whom supported Władysław I Łokietek, while others supported Wenceslaus II of Bohemia – and by mid-September 1290 Przemysł II left Kraków to return to Greater Poland. Meanwhile, in order to further increase his contemporary significance, Władysław gave his niece Fenenna (daughter of his half-brother Ziemomysł) in marriage to Andrew III, the Hungarian king of the Arpad dynasty.

Przemysł II finally gave up power over Kraków in mid-January of the following year (1291), and the principality then accepted the Czech monarch Wenceslaus II as its sovereign. (Note: The legal grounds for the reign of the Bohemian Przemyślid dynasty were very weak, and were based on the claims of Leszek II the Black's widow Gryfina, which was not accepted by the Polish princes. But Wenceslaus II was supported by a solid military force, and so the Duke of Greater Poland preferred not to risk a dispute.) Władysław decided to fight for Lesser Poland with the help of Hungarian troops granted to him by Andrew III. In 1292, Bohemian troops, through numerical superiority and with support from Silesian princes and the Margrave of Brandenburg, drove Władysław the Short first from Sandomierz, and in September of that same year, surrounded him in a fortified Sieradz. The siege was soon successful, and Władysław and his brother Casimir II found themselves in captivity. On 9 October 1292 an agreement was signed under which Władysław and Casimir II were forced to renounce claims to Lesser Poland and to make fealty to the Czech ruler, in return for which they remained on their Kuyavian leases.

=== Collaboration with Przemysł II (1293–1296) ===
Their recent failures and the threat of Wenceslaus II prompted Przemysł II and Władysław, the existing Polish competitors for the throne of Kraków, to meet in Kalisz in January 1293 in order to develop strategies for removing the Czech government. The reconciliation of the opponents occurred as a result of the intervention of Archbishop Jakub Świnka; for his part, the archbishop was promised the revenues from the salt mines after Lesser Poland was won. The secret agreement, signed 6 January 1293, committed the three princes (the arrangement was also attended by Casimir II of Łęczyca) to mutual support in the effort to recover Kraków. At that time, they probably developed a survival agreement to guarantee mutual inheritance in the event of the recovery of Kraków. The occasion of this congress may have also marked the marriage of Władysław I Łokietek with Jadwiga, the daughter of Bolesław the Pious, uncle of Przemysł II.

One year later (1294), it was already necessary to revise the plans approved in Kalisz, as Casimir II was killed while fighting against the Lithuanians. As a result, Łęczyca was added to the lands of Władysław I Łokietek. On 26 June 1295, Przemysł II was crowned as the Polish king with the permission of the Pope. Władysław's response to this development is unknown. Unfortunately, the new king enjoyed his coronation for only seven months, as on 8 February 1296, Przemysł II was murdered, perhaps incited by the Margraves of Brandenburg.

=== Marriage ===
When Przemysł II was still alive, Władysław I Łokietek married Jadwiga, daughter of Bolesław the Pious. There are three main theories among historians as to when the wedding took place. The most historic assumes that the marriage took place during the life of Jadwiga's father, and so no later than 1279. The second theory, which now has the most supporters, is that the wedding took place between 1290 and 1293, possibly at the conclusion of the meeting in Kalisz in January 1293, and that in 1279 there was perhaps only an engagement (matrimonium de futuro). The third theory posits a specific date of the marriage as 23 April 1289.

=== Initial efforts in Greater Poland (1296–1298) ===
For wealthy Greater Poland, it became evident that the throne of Przemysł II deserved his closest ally, Prince Władysław of Kuyavia. The fact that Władysław I Łokietek was known to dislike the Germans was not irrelevant, as they were generally regarded as the perpetrators of the murder of Przemsył II. However, there was a testament of Przemysł II, written about 1290, recognising Henry III of Głogów as his heir. Neither party wanted bloody battles, and so an arrangement was made on 10 March 1296 in Krzywiń in which Władysław agreed to give Henry III the part of Greater Poland west and south of the rivers Obra and Warta up to the mouth of the Noteć. Władysław also established his successor in the event he died without a male heir: Henry IV the Faithful, Henry III's eldest son. Also, regardless of the future birth of any sons of his own, Władysław agreed to give the duchy of Poznań to Henry IV Faithful when he reached adulthood.

The division of Greater Poland that was agreed upon in Krzywiń did not address all of the contentious issues, especially in light of the fact that male heirs of Władysław I Łokietek soon came into the world. The governments of Władysław I Łokietek in his part of Greater Poland were not successful because banditry was spreading there and internal opposition grew stronger, headed by Andrzej Zaremba, the bishop of Poznań. It was suspected, though denied by some historians, that Bishop Zaremba placed a curse of the church on Władysław. In addition, Archbishop Jakub Świnka, seeing that the Duke of Kuyavia was having problems with proper governance, began distancing himself from his earlier protege. In 1298, a meeting between the opposition from Greater Poland and Henry III of Głogów occurred in Kościan to conclude an agreement under which, in return for renewed offices for the opposition in a future reunited duchy, they would support Henry's candidacy for the throne of Greater Poland.

=== Flight from the country (1299–1304) ===
The real threat to Władysław's power actually came from the south. Wenceslaus II of Bohemia decided to crack down on the Duke of Kuyavia. In 1299 in Klęka, an agreement was concluded under which Władysław I Łokietek agreed to resubmit homage to Wenceslaus II, in return for which he would receive 400 grzywnas and an eight-year income from the mines in Olkusz. Władysław, however, did not keep the terms and conditions made in Klęka, and in July 1299, Wenceslaus II organised a military expedition that resulted in the Kujavian prince fleeing the country.

It is not known exactly where Władysław I Łokietek lived during the years 1300–1304. According to tradition, he went to Rome, where he took part in the celebration of the great jubilee of 1300 organised by Pope Boniface VIII. Other places he might have stayed were Ruthenia and Hungary, with whose magnates Władysław had allied relations. During that time, Władysław's spouse Jadwiga and their children stayed in Kuyavia in the town of Radziejow in the guise of ordinary townspeople.

=== Recovery of Kuyavia, Lesser Poland, and Gdańsk Pomerania (1304–1306) ===
Władysław I Łokietek returned to Lesser Poland in 1304 with an army of his supporters, which, according to the 15th-century historian Jan Długosz, consisted of more peasants than knights. He settled in Sandomierz with the help of the Hungarian magnate Amadeus Aba. Later that same year, he was able to master the castles in Wiślica and Lelów. Success for the indomitable prince would have been short-lived, if not for several favorable circumstances. On 21 June 1305, Wenceslaus II, the Czech and Polish king, died unexpectedly and his inheritance passed to his only son, Wenceslaus III. Władysław took advantage of the situation perfectly, mastering the duchies of Sandomierz, Sieradz-Łęczyca, and Brześć Kujawski by the end of the year. The declining Czech government tried to support Wenceslaus III by organising an expedition against Władysław. Again, luck favoured Władysław, as on 4 August 1306, Wenceslaus III was murdered in Olomouc in Moravia, and the Kingdom of Bohemia was without a monarch and in the heat of a civil war.

The death of the last Přemyslid on the Bohemian throne resulted in a rally of knights in Kraków, which led to an official invitation to Władysław I Łokietek to take power. There was a festive entrance to the capital of Lesser Poland on 1 September 1306, and this has been linked with the issuance of a privilege for the city and for the current leading advocate of Czech rule, Jan Muskata, the bishop of Kraków.

Another goal of Władysław I Łokietek was to regain the inheritance of Przemysł II: Greater Poland and Pomerelia (Gdańsk Pomerania). This unification campaign, however, encountered considerable difficulties. In Greater Poland, Władysław managed to only take control of the Kuyavia-border towns of Konin, Koło, and Nakło, because the rest of the duchy had accepted the rule of his old enemy Henry III of Głogów (except Wielun, which was occupied by prince Bolko I of Opole). Pomerelia, however, became subordinate to the rule of Władysław I Łokietek as a result of an expedition at the end of 1306, accepting tribute from representatives of Pomeranian society in Byszewo. Control over this remote area had to be transferred to governors. Władysław no longer trusted the Pomeranian Swienca family, so despite leaving Peter Swienca, the senior family member, as voivode, the role of governor was given to his two nephews (the sons of Ziemomysł). Przemysł became governor of Świecie and Casimir III took Gdańsk and Tczew.

=== Annexation of Pomerelia by the Teutonic Knights (1307–1309) ===
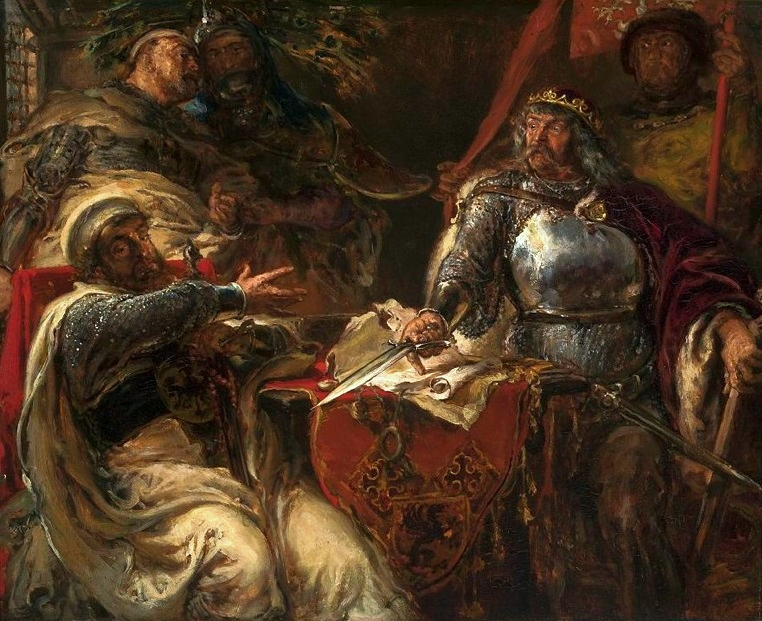
King Władysław I Łokietek breaking off agreements with the Teutonic Knights at Brześć Kujawski, a painting by Jan Matejko in the National Museum in Warsaw

Meanwhile, Gerward, the bishop of Kuyavia (Włocławek), appeared against the Peter Swienca family and demanded that they return episcopal income stolen from him when Peter was governor for the Czech Kingdom. Peter lost the arbitration process, which ordered him to return to the Bishop the enormous amount of 2,000 grzywnas. Despite a partial guarantee by Władysław the Short, the Swienca family was unable to pay such a sum; therefore, on 17 July 1307 they changed their allegiance from Władysław to Waldemar, Margrave of Brandenburg, and received from him in fief the towns of Darłowo, Polanowo, Sławno, Tuchola, and Nowe, and received in perpetuity the Land of Slupsk. In August 1307, Waldemar attacked Pomerelia. Resistance to the invaders on behalf of Władysław I Łokietek came from Bogusz, a Pomerelian judge who entrenched himself in the city of Gdańsk. It soon became clear, however, that his forces could not cope with the aggressors.

On the advice of the German prior of the Dominican Order in Gdańsk, Władysław I Łokietek decided to bring the Teutonic Order in to help. At first, it seemed that all went well, as the knights under Günther von Schwarzburg, the commander of Chełmno, successfully drove the Brandenburgs from Gdańsk and then moved on to Tczew. However, the Prussian Grand Master did not listen to Prince Casimir, Władysław's governor residing in Tczew, and without a struggle took the city. Then the Knights took Nowe and in 1308, completed the campaign. Only Świecie remained in the hands of Władysław I Łokietek. In April 1309, in Kuyavia, there was a meeting between Władysław I Łokietek and the Prussian Grand Master about the seizure of Pomerelia, at which the Teutonic Order issued to the Prince an absurd bill for the relief of Gdańsk, and then offered to purchase the territory. Both proposals were rejected by Wladyslaw. Consequently, in July 1309, the Teutonic Knights began the siege of Świecie. The garrison surrendered the city only in September. In order to legitimize their conduct, the Knights purchased in September a questionable right to the district from Brandenburg. The annexation of Pomerelia enabled the Grand Master to finally transfer their capital from Venice to Malbork.

=== Coping with internal opposition – Jan Muskata and the rebellion of Mayor Albert (1308–1312) ===
The reason that Władysław I Łokietek could not be involved directly in Pomerelian affairs was the unstable situation in Lesser Poland. The source of the unrest was Jan Muskata, the bishop of Kraków and a former follower of Wenceslaus II. Muskata began to sow discord against Władysław soon after he gained the throne of Kraków by trying to establish contacts with his enemies Bolko I of Opole and Henry III of Głogów. To help the Prince of Kraków came the venerable archbishop of Gniezno, Jakub Świnka. On 14 June 1308, Świnka deprived Muskata of his bishopric for abuse of power. Using judgment, Władysław imprisoned the bishop for only half a year and then forced him to leave the boundaries of the principality. Muskata did not return to Kraków until 1317.

In 1311, Władysław I Łokietek survived another crisis of his reign. This time the threat came from within Kraków, where the local German nobility said that they now supported and would obey John of Bohemia, the new king of Bohemia. The reason for this state of affairs was the excessive (in their opinion) tax burden caused by the policy of unification of the Polish lands and the economic crisis associated with the loss of Pomerelia. At the head of the revolt was Albert, the mayor of Kraków, who called to the city Duke Bolko I of Opole. The rebels managed to control Kraków and gain the support of several other cities in Lesser Poland, but Wawel was saved by troops loyal to Władysław, which made the chances of a successful rebellion questionable. The situation had not changed when the Duke of Opole arrived in April 1312. Historians debate whether Bolko I came to Kraków for his own purposes, or rather as a governor on behalf of the new Czech king, John of Bohemia, who was also using the title of King of Poland. However, John could not support this militant rebellion as a result of the problems he faced in Moravia with his own rebels. In any case, attempts to capture Wawel Castle failed, and strengthened by Hungarian support, Władysław the Short mastered the rebellion in Sandomierz and forced Bolko I of Opole to leave Kraków in June 1312. Upon returning to Opole, Bolko kidnapped Mayor Albert and, for unknown reasons, had him imprisoned (perhaps to recover by ransom the costs incurred in connection with the trip to Kraków). After ending the rebellion, Władysław proceeded to punish the rebels. The penalties were severe; some councilors were hanged and their property confiscated, and the city of Kraków itself lost some of its privileges (e.g., hereditary headmen). Soon after the rebellion, Latin was introduced to the books of the city rather than German.

=== Mastering Greater Poland (1309–1315) ===
On 9 December 1309, Henry III of Głogów — who had claimed to be the successor of King Przemysł II and was the main competitor of Władysław I Łokietek for the duchy of Greater Poland — died, leaving his district to be divided between his five sons. Henry, Jan, and Przemko received Poznań, and Bolesław and Konrad received Gniezno and Kalisz, which they divided respectively one year later. This division formed a new territorial organisation based on the cities, instead of the previous castellan division. This threatened the local elite, and so in 1314 the nobility and knights raised a rebellion against the sons of Henry III of Głogow. These events surprised the dukes such that they could not effectively stop the rebellion, and their troops sent under the command of Janusz Biberstein suffered defeat. Seeking an independent political position, the local knighthood also gained Poznań, which was defended by the mayor Przemek and the townspeople. The knights of Greater Poland, knowing about Władysław's suppression of the rebellion of mayor Albert in Kraków, discerned that he was a defender of their economic and political interests. The result was the transfer of power to Władysław, who entered Poznań in August 1314. After the events in Poznań, he began to designate himself as the prince of the Polish Kingdom. (Note: E. Długopolski (in Władysław Łokietek na tle swoich czasów (en: Władysław Łokietek against the background of his time), Wrocław: Ossolineum, 1951, p. 171) indicates that Władysław I Łokietek began to be an heir to the Polish kingdom already in 1313, among others in a document from 10 November, which announced that the parish church in Brześć was being given to the Star Brethren and the hospital house of the Holy Ghost, and which was meant to be an igniter of military operations after a 5-year break in pursuing his pretensions to power in the whole of Greater Poland.)

The dukes were forced to come to terms with the loss of Greater Poland, as they remained only with part of the territories bordering the rivers Obra and Noteć.

The recovery of Greater Poland allowed Władysław entry into broader international politics. In 1315, Poland concluded an alliance against Brandenburg with the three monarchies of Scandinavia: Denmark, Sweden, and Norway, as well as the duchies of Mecklenburg and Pomerania. The war broke out a year later; however, it did not bring success and only caused the destruction of frontier territories.

=== Coronation (1315–1320) ===
Around that time, Władysław I Łokietek also began efforts to obtain papal consent for a royal coronation. This plan was actively supported by the Polish church, led by Borzysław I, the archbishop of Gniezno (the successor of Jakub Swinka, who died in 1314), and Gerward, the bishop of Kuyavia (Włocławek). The decision about the coronation was ultimately made during two rallies of nobles and knights; the first was held from 20 to 23 June 1318 in Sulejow, where a special supplication was prepared with a request to the Pope, and the second on 29 June in Pyzdry. Bishop Gerward was sent to Avignon with the documents. The successful arrangement featured a replacement method of calculating the papal pence on terms favorable for the papacy.

Consent was given by Pope John XXII on 20 August 1319, though not directly due to the opposition of King John of Bohemia, who also claimed the crown of Poland. The Pope was looking for a way to preserve the rights of Władysław and Poland without infringing on those of John and Bohemia, and found that the Luxembourg claims (despite their tenuous legal basis) referred to Greater Poland, the "kingdom" of Przemysł II. As such, Kraków was chosen for the coronation instead of Gniezno, in that a coronation in Kraków would not violate the rights of John of Bohemia. On 20 January 1320 in the Wawel Cathedral, Janisław, the archbishop of Gniezno (succeeding Borzysław I), crowned Władysław as King of Poland. Placing the rite of Polish coronation in Kraków, however, caused John to question its legality. In light of John of Bohemia's use of the title King of Poland, in the international arena, Władysław I Łokietek was considered the King of Kraków, and not of the whole country.

The year 1320 was important for the politics of Władysław I Łokietek for other reasons. On 14 April 1320 in Inowrocław, and then in Brześć Kujavia, he began deliberations with the papal court to judge the case of the annexation of Gdańsk Pomerania by the Teutonic Knights. After hearing twenty-five witnesses for the Polish side, the judges released a decision favorable to the King on 9 February 1321. According to that decision, the Teutonic Order had to return Pomerania to Poland, pay 30,000 grzywnas in compensation for the collection of income from Pomerania, and pay for the cost of the process. The Teutonic Knights did not expect that such a judgment would be surrendered and filed an appeal. Under the influence of the actions of the procurator of the Teutonic Order in the Papal Curia, the Pope did not approve of the judgment of Inowrocław and the case was suspended. This gave the Holy See the opportunity to use the conflict for their own purposes in the subsequent years.

=== Alliances (1320) ===
Władysław's kingdom was now surrounded by three hostile forces: Brandenburg, the Teutonic Order, and the Luxembourg Kingdom of Bohemia. Looking for allies during the great European conflict between Pope John XXII and Ludwig Wittelsbach (Louis of Bavaria), Władysław I Łokietek sided with the papal camp. Władysław's alliance with the Charles I of Hungary, king of Hungary, was strengthened in 1320 by Charles I of Hungary's marriage to Wladyslaw's daughter Elizabeth Łokietkówną.

=== Expedition to Rus' and the war with Brandenburg (1323–1326) ===
Three years later, the Polish-Hungarian alliance proved itself in Rus' Galicia. The last two princes descended from the dynasty of Rurik, Andrew of Galicia and Lev II of Galicia, were killed in battle. The allies decided to help the closest relative of the late princes — Bolesław George, the son of Trojden I, Duke of Masovia — in mastering the local throne. This effort led to increased Polish influence in Russia, which enabled the eventual takeover of the region by Wladyslaw's son and successor, Casimir III the Great.

The Lithuanian Duke Gediminas became another ally of the King Władysław I Łokietek in 1325. This alliance was supported by the marriage between Gediminas's daughter Aldona (who adopted the baptismal name of Anna) and Władysław's son Casimir.

In 1323, the Holy Roman Emperor Louis IV gave his son Louis V the March of Brandenburg. Pope John XXII therefore summoned his supporters to not allow the assumption of the Ascanian inheritance by the Bavarian House of Wittelsbach. With Lithuanian support, Władysław I Łokietek invaded Brandenburg on 10 February 1326. He informed the Teutonic Knights about the participation of pagan armies in the expedition. He could, at least temporarily, count on their neutrality, since their truce was in force until the end of 1326. Approaching Brandenburg did not yield significant results, apart from some destruction, prisoners, and recovery of the castellany of Międzyrzecz. This did not improve Władysław's popularity in Germany, as it was perceived that the Polish king, together with heathens, initiated war with the Christian world. The papacy kept silent and did not support the Polish king, but it did not condemn him. The war with Brandenburg also alarmed the Silesian princes. In the same year, Władysław I Łokietek regained the land of Wieluń from Bolesław the Elder, the Duke of Niemodlin.

=== Failed attempt to master Mazovia (1327–1328) ===
Władysław I Łokietek organised another armed expedition the following year. This time, the target was the subordination of Wenceslaus, the duke of Płock. The expedition, despite the acquisition and burning of Płock, ended in failure, mainly because the Teutonic Order joined the war on the side of Wenceslaus, and soon after, John of Bohemia, king of Bohemia, did likewise. Larger clashes with the opponents did not occur, but the King of Bohemia, taking advantage of military activity in Silesia, received a tribute from the princes of Upper Silesia in Opava in February 1327.

In connection with the outbreak of the Polish–Teutonic War in 1327 and the associated threat to border areas, possessions were exchanged between the king and his nephews. Between 28 May 1327 and 14 October 1328, Przemysł of Inowrocław gave Wladyslaw the Duchy of Inowrocław with Wyszogród and Bydgoszcz in exchange for the Duchy of Sieradz. And probably at the turn of 1327/1328, the sons of Siemowit of Dobrzyń — Władysław the Hunchback and Bolesław of Dobrzyń — exchanged the principality of Dobrzyń for the principality of Łęczyca.

=== Loss of Dobrzyń (1329) ===
In 1329, there was a resumption of warfare. John of Bohemia, with the help of the Teutonic Knights, took Dobrzyń, which he soon gave to his allies. Another loss was John's successful coercion of Wenceslaus of Płock to pay homage to him. And so the Duke of Plock refused to accept the sovereignty of the Polish monarch, and instead was dominated by a stranger. The Teutonic Knights, taking advantage of the fact that Kuyavia was not prepared for war, crossed the Vistula and burned and destroyed the bishoprics of Wloclawek, Raciąż, and Przedecz.

=== The war with the Teutonic Knights in Kuyavia and the Battle of Płowce (1330–1332) ===
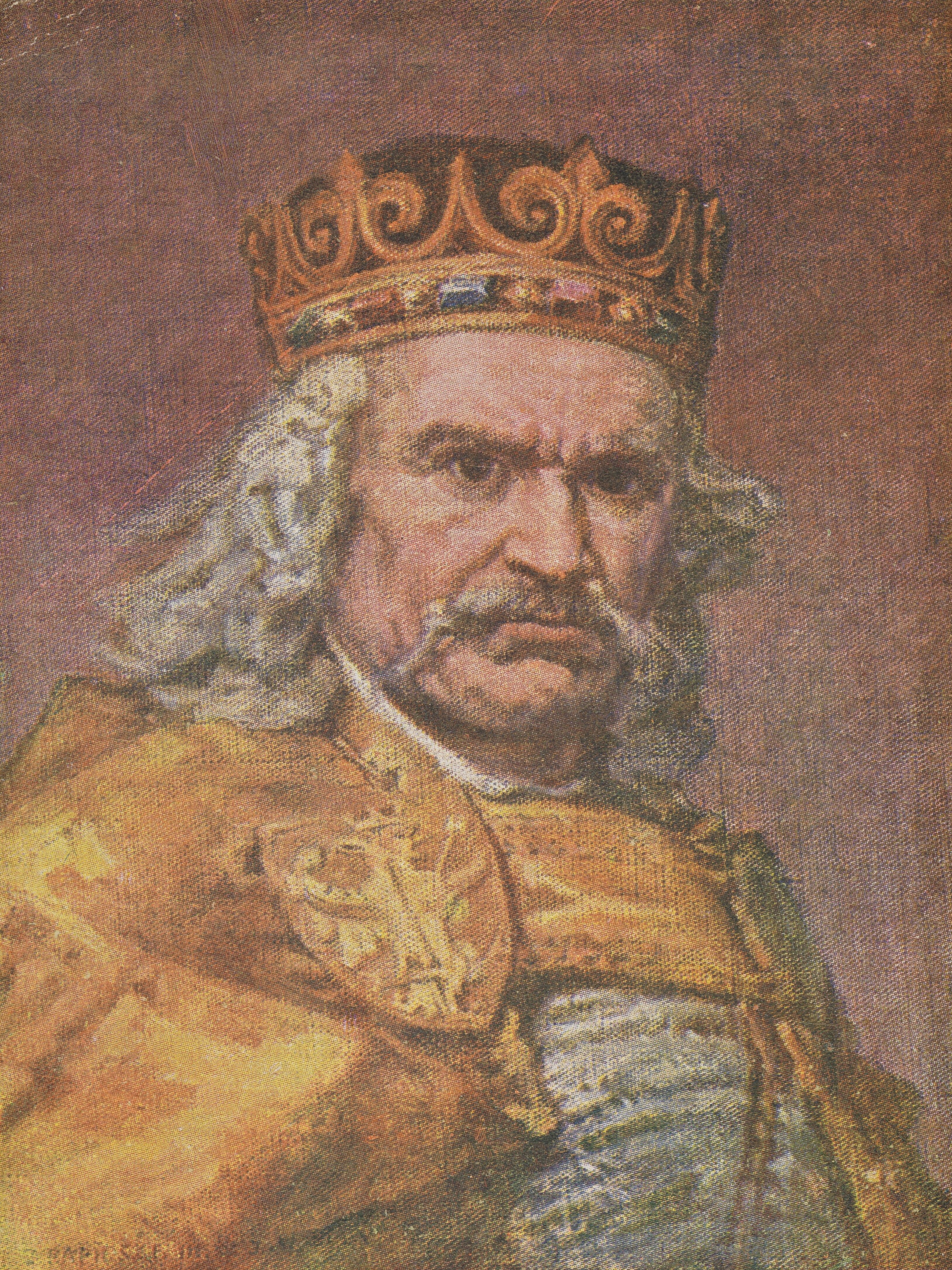
Władysław I Łokietek, by Jan Matejko

In 1330, the Teutonic Knights resumed hostilities. Crusaders successfully plundered cities in Kuyavia and Greater Poland: Radziejów, Bydgoszcz, and Nakło. Only by a daring crossing of the Vistula River by Władysław and an intrusion into Chełmno with the help of Lithuanians were the allies successful in besieging the castle of Kowalewo Pomorskie in September. Then, under the besieged castle of the Teutonic Knights in Lipienek, the king agreed to a seven-month truce on 18 October 1330. Unfortunately, during this trip, the alliance with the Duke of Lithuania was compromised as a result of a personal quarrel between Władysław and Gediminas.

In 1331, there was another armed expedition by the Teutonic Knights into Polish lands. This time, according to the action plan of the Order, the troops under the command of Dietrich von Altenburg were to coordinate with the expedition of King John of Bohemia. The two armies were to meet under the walls of Kalisz. In the middle of the year, Teutonic troops carrying out a reconnaissance effort entered Kuyavia and Greater Poland, including taking Pyzdry (where there was a skirmish with the Polish troops) and Gniezno. The main expedition was organized in September 1331. While the Knights went to meet at Kalisz as agreed, upon arrival, there were no Czech troops present. John of Bohemia had stopped in Silesia, where he effectively stopped the resistance of Bolko II of Świdnica and resolved the unsettled case of Głogów after the death of Duke Przemko II.

Unable to deliver a decisive blow to Władysław I Łokietek, the Knights decided to finally master Kuyavia. The night of 23–24 September saw the first major unresolved clash near Konin. Three days later, in the morning, Polish troops numbering about 5,000 and led personally by King Władysław and his son Prince Casimir encountered the rear guard of the Teutonic Knights near Radziejów. Taking advantage of the surprise, the Poles defeated the enemy unit and took Dietrich von Altenburg, the commander of the expedition, as a prisoner. In the afternoon, however, there was another clash near the village of Płowce. The battle was not settled because of the withdrawal of some Polish troops with Prince Casimir, and in the confusion, the Teutonic commander escaped from captivity. Though inconclusive, the Battle of Płowce was important psychologically for the Poles as it convinced them that the Knights were not insurmountable.

Soon after these events, peace negotiations were initiated in Inowrocław. However, this time it was not possible for Władysław to reach an agreement with the Teutonic Knights. In 1332, the Knights organized a big military expedition under the command of Otto von Luteberg. This time, the Polish forces were too thin to face the resistance of the Knights in the open field. On 20 April, after a nearly two-week siege, Brześć, the capital of Kuyavia, fell. Soon, the Teutonic Knights were also in the other main strongholds of the province – Inowrocław and Gniewkowo, the latter of which was destroyed on the orders of the prince of the land, Casimir III of Gniewkowo.

The loss of Kuyavia, which was his patrimony, was certainly very painful for Władysław, although in the same year, taking advantage of the death of Przemko II of Głogów, he took Zbąszyń in Greater Poland by the river Obra, which had been held by the dukes of Głogow.

=== Death ===
Władysław I Łokietek died on 2 March 1333 at the Wawel Castle in Kraków, where he was buried in the cathedral, perhaps on 12 March of that year. His son, Casimir III the Great, inherited Lesser Poland, the Duchy of Sandomierz, Greater Poland, Kuyavia, and the Duchies of Łęczyca and Sieradz. However, Silesia and Lubusz Land to the west, along with Gdańsk Pomerania, Western Pomerania, and Mazovia to the north, remained outside the kingdom's borders. Nevertheless, Władysław's reign was a major step on the road to the restoration of the Kingdom of Poland.

== Legacy and assessment of the ruler ==
Władysław I Łokietek persistently pursued the goal of his life, to unite Poland. He was not, however, entirely successful, and his achievements did not come easily. Furthermore, if not for the unexpected deaths of his many stronger opponents: Leszek II the Black, Henry Probus, Casimir II of Łęczyca, Przemysł II of Greater Poland, Wenceslaus II, Wenceslaus III, and Henry III, Duke of Głogów, Władysław might have forever remained the prince of tiny Brześć-Kuyavia. But if not for the persistent and consistent actions of Władysław I Łokietek, Poland could have become part of the Luxembourg monarchy or could have been permanently divided. It was during his reign that Poland seriously clashed for the first time with the Teutonic Order and established a surprising alliance with Lithuania that would ultimately last for centuries. With the coronation at Wawel, the King established a precedent and solidified the position of the Polish kingdom. Władysław also endeavored to establish a uniform legal code throughout the land. In this code, he assured the safety and freedom of Jews and placed them on an equal footing with Christians. Finally, as he initiated the unification of the country, he also began to organise a nationwide administration structure and treasury. This action was successfully continued by his son and successor, Casimir III the Great.

If not for the merits of his father, Casimir III would not have been able to have the threshold rule to pay the king of Bohemia and titular Polish king John of Bohemia the gigantic sum of 1.2 million Prague groschen to cede his rights to the Polish crown, or to speak with the biggest European rulers as equals, or develop an economically unified state. As in the case of Mieszko I and Bolesław I the Brave, the father lies in the shadow of his son and successor.

== Royal titles ==
- Title before coronation: Wladislaus Dei gracia, dux Regni Poloniae et dominus Pomeraniae, Cuiavie, Lanciciae ac Siradiae;
- :English translation: Vladislaus by the grace of God, duke of the Kingdom of Poland, and lord of Pomerania, Kuyavia, Łęczyca and Sieradz;
- Royal title after coronation: Wladislaus Dei gracia, rex Poloniae et dominus Pomeraniae, Cuiavie, Lanciciae ac Siradiae;
- :English translation: Vladislaus by the grace of God, king of Poland, and lord of Pomerania, Kuyavia, Łęczyca and Sieradz.

Later histories refer to him also as Władysław IV or Władysław I. There are no records to show that he actually used any regnal number. Both numerals are retrospective assignments by later historians. "IV" comes from him being the fourth of that name to rule as overlord of the Polish, since Władysław I Herman. "I" comes from him having restored the monarchy after a fragmented era of a century or more, and also backwards-counting from Władysław III of Poland, who officially used the numeral III, and Władysław Vasa, who used the numeral IV.

== Family ==
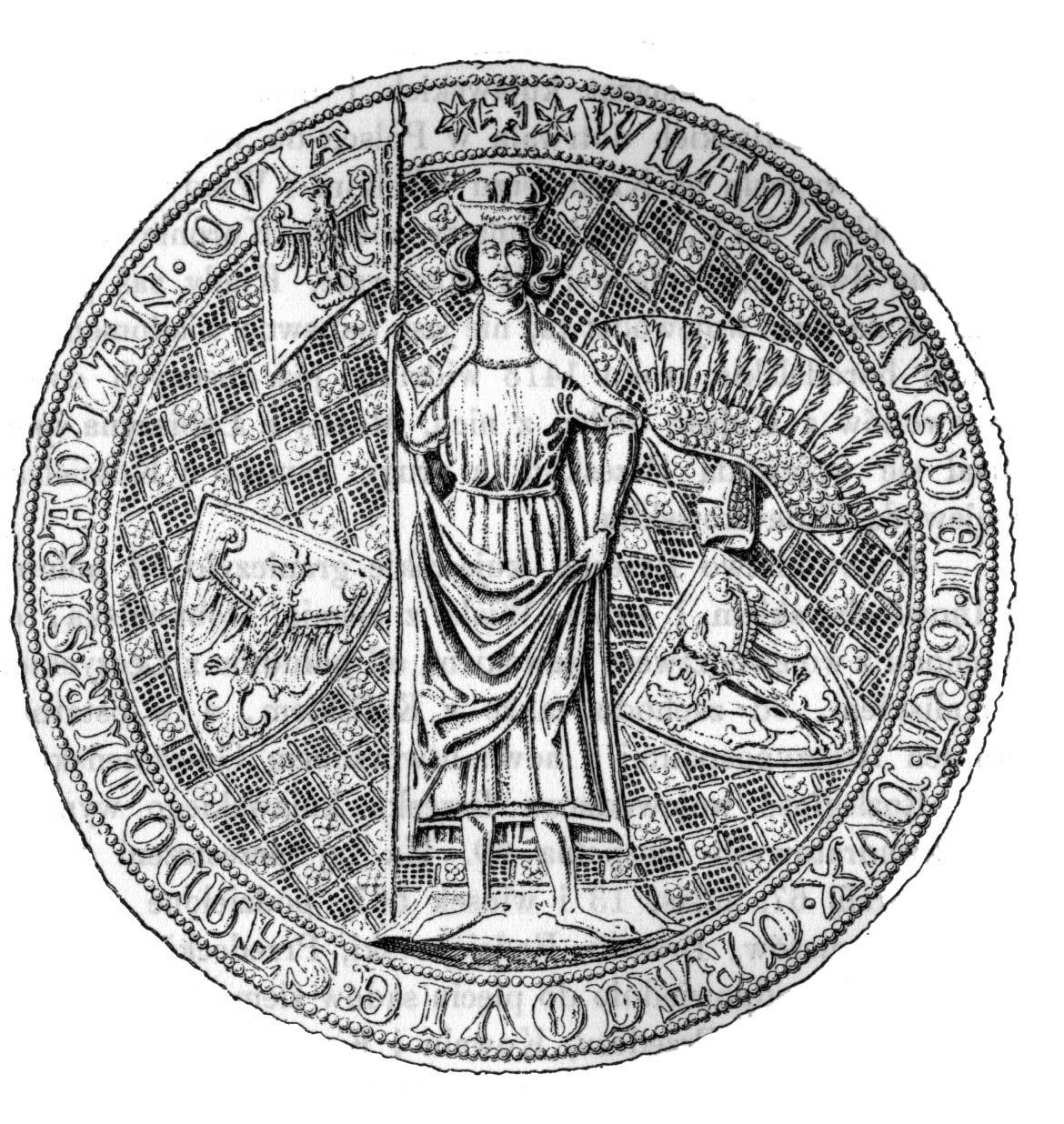
Ducal seal of Władysław I Łokietek from 1315

Władysław married Jadwiga of Kalisz, the daughter of Bolesław the Pious, Duke of Greater Poland, and Yolanda of Poland. They had six known children. (Note: Although it is generally accepted that Władysław had three sons, doubts have been raised regarding Stefan's existence. See Jasiński, K. 2001.)

- Kunigunde (born between 1295 and 1298; died 9 April 1331 or in 1333). Married first Bernard of Świdnica. Their children included Bolko II of Świdnica. Married secondly Rudolf I, Duke of Saxe-Wittenberg;
- Stefan (born between 1296 and 1300; died 1306) – probably honoring Stefan V, uncle of Jadwiga, or possibly St. Stephen; nevertheless, this name indicates a Hungarian influence. He was buried in the Franciscan Church of Kraków;
- Władysław (born between 1296 and 1311; died 1312) – named after his father; he was buried, like Stefan, in the Franciscan Church of Kraków;
- Elizabeth (1305 – 29 December 1380) – the wife of Charles I of Hungary (1288–1342), King of Hungary (1308–1342);
- Casimir III the Great (30 April 1310 – 5 November 1370), King of Poland (1333–1370);
- Jadwiga (born between 1306 and 1309 or between 1311 and 1319; died 3 June between 1320 and 1335) – named after her mother. Otto, Duke of Austria (1301–1339), Duke of Austria (1330–1339), may have applied for her hand in marriage, perhaps in 1331.

== In popular culture ==
He is played by Wiesław Wójcik in the Polish historical drama TV series Korona królów (The Crown of the Kings). He is a recurring character in the first season.

== Gallery ==
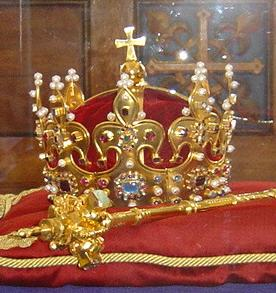
The so-called Crown of Bolesław I the Brave was made for Władysław I.

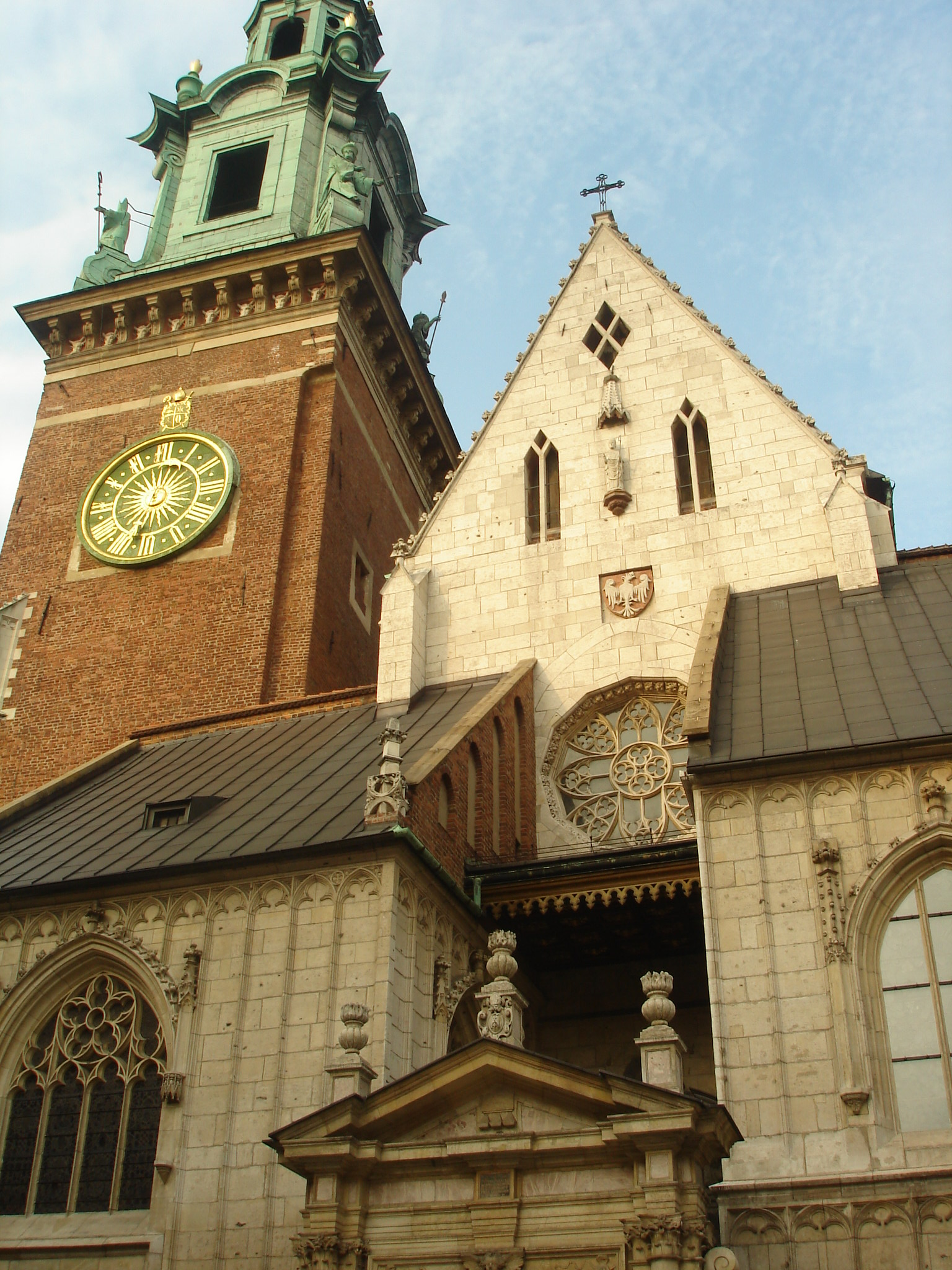
In 1320 the King began the building of a new Wawel Cathedral.

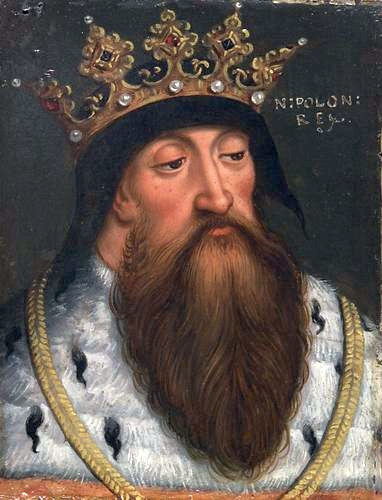
16th century portrait by Anton Boys

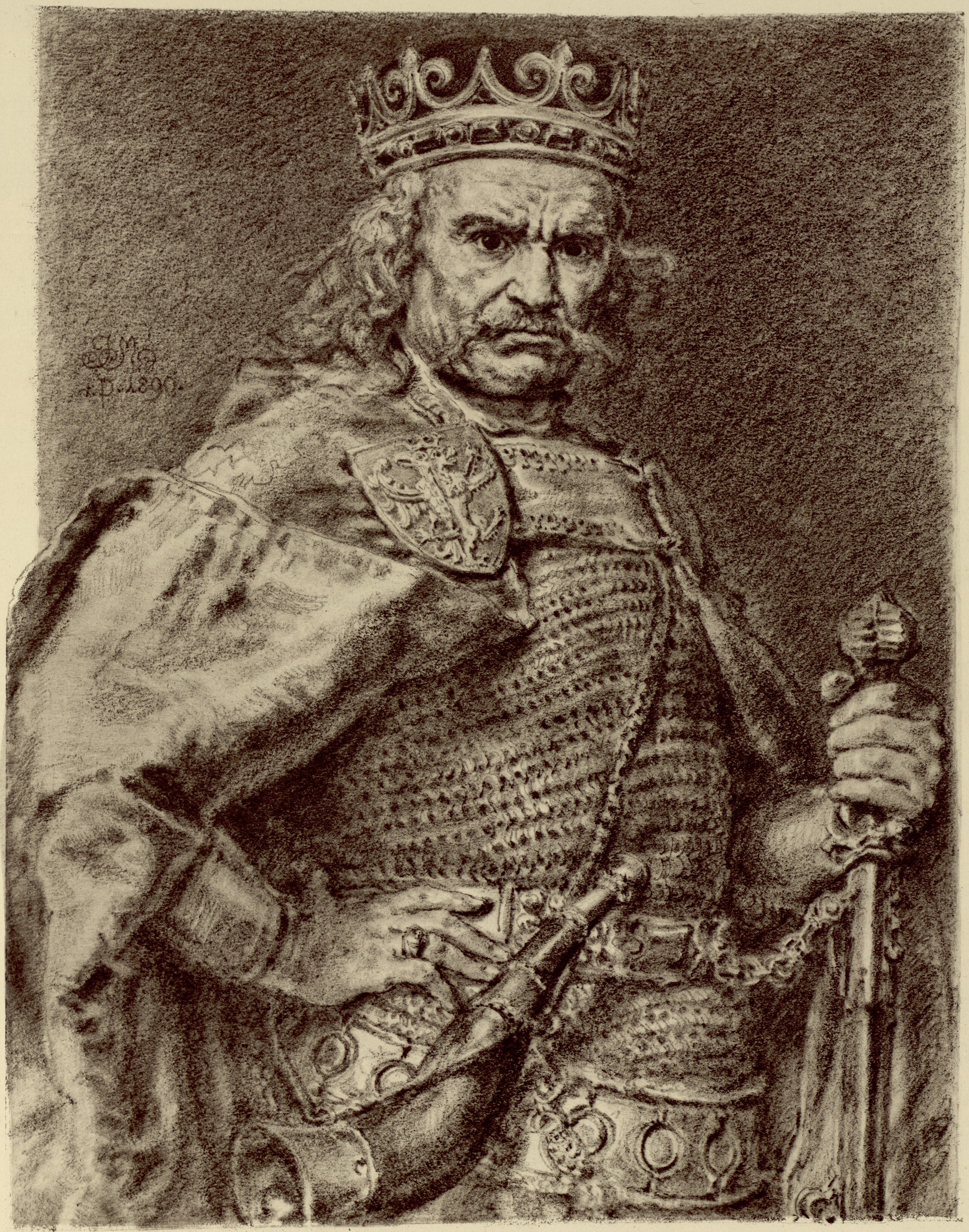
Portrait of King Władysław I by Jan Matejko

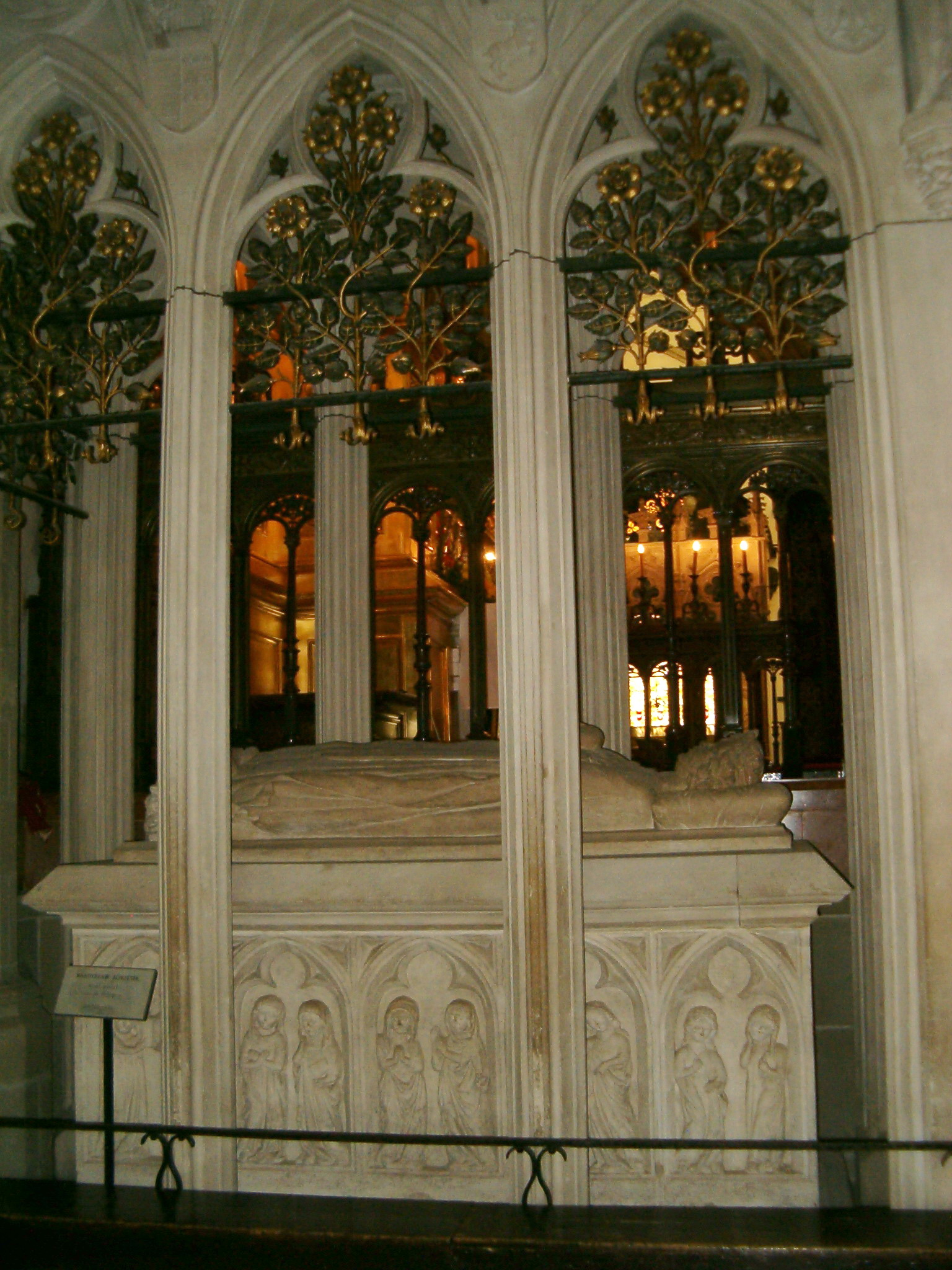
The tomb of the monarch inside the Wawel Cathedral

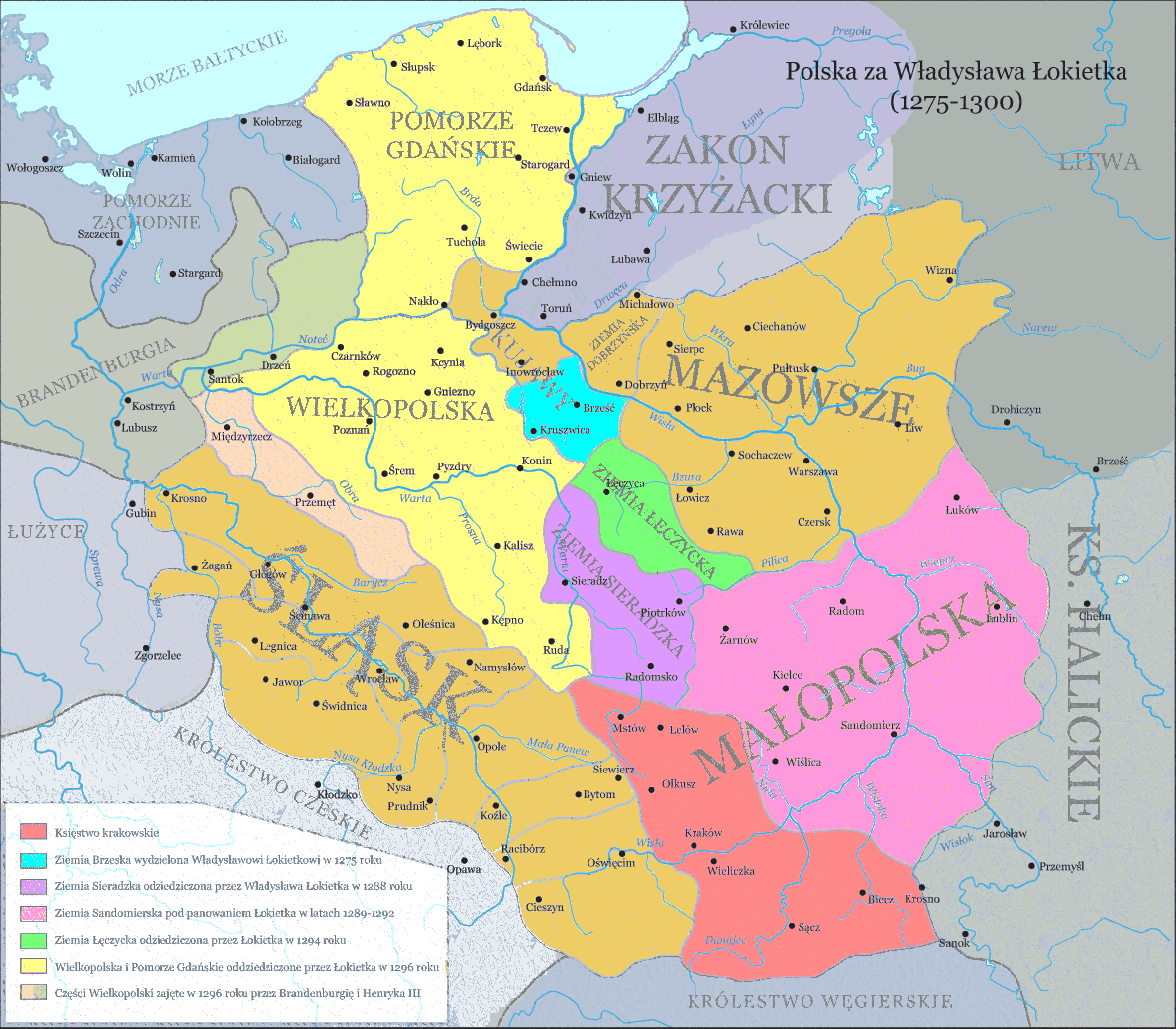
Poland between 1275 and 1300.

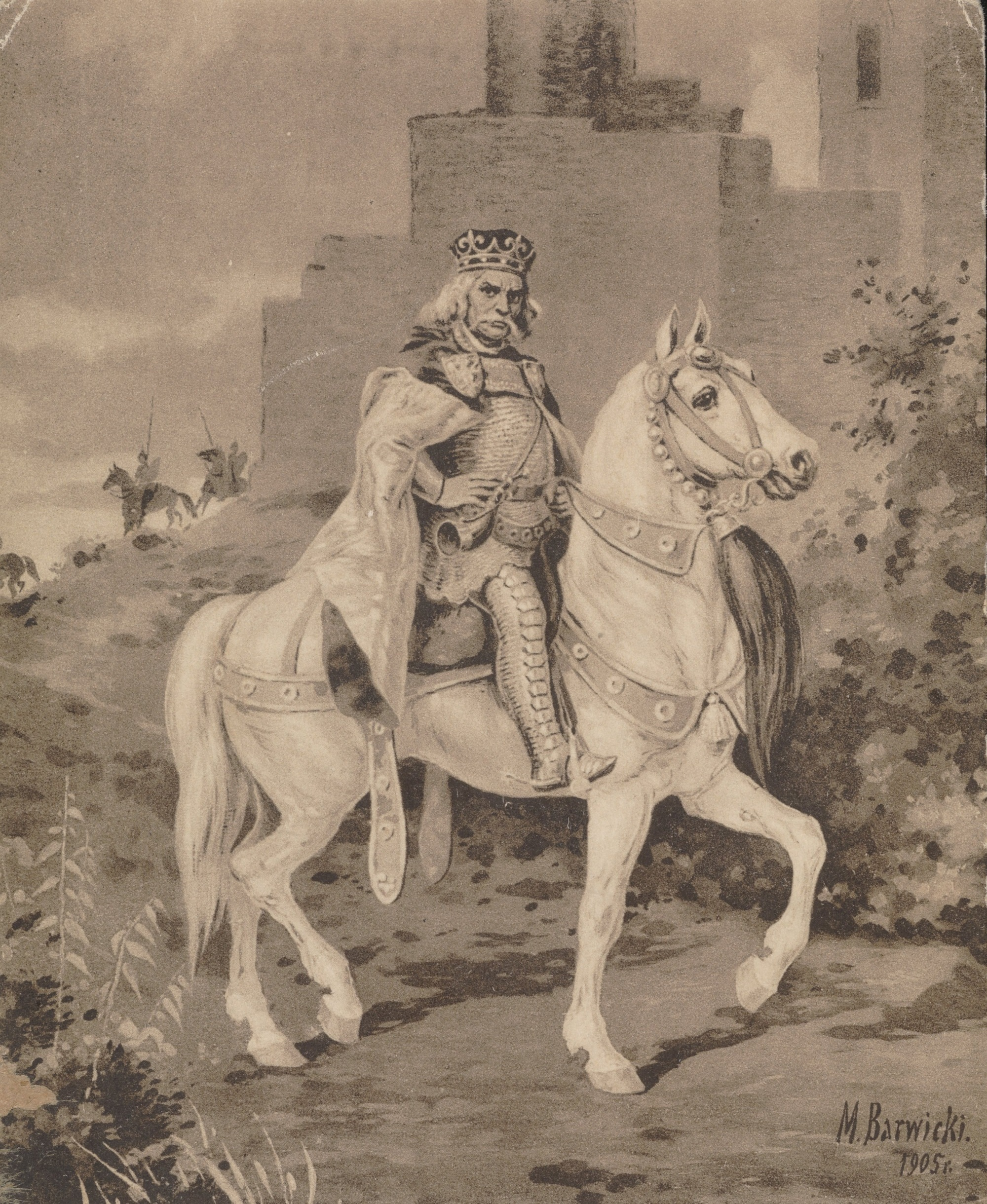
Władysław I on White Horse by M. Barwicki.

== See also ==
- History of Poland (966–1385)
- List of Poles

== Bibliography ==
- Davies, Norman (2005). God's Playground A History of Poland: Volume 1: The Origins to 1795. Oxford University Press.
- Engel, Pál (2005). Realm of St. Stephen: A History of Medieval Hungary. I.B. Tauris.
- Jasiński, K. (2001). Rodowód Piastów małopolskich i kujawskich [Pedigree of the Piasts of Lesser Poland and Kuyavia] (in Polish).

Władysław I Łokietek Piast dynasty Born: 1260/1261 Died: 2 March 1333
Royal titles
Preceded by Wenceslaus III of Bohemia	King of Poland; 1320 – 1333	Succeeded by Casimir III the Great
