= Agnes of Głogów =

Duchess of Głogów, Duchess of Lower Bavaria and Countess of Hals

- Duchess consort of Lower Bavaria
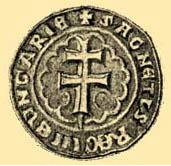
- Seal of Agnes of Głogów
- Born: 1293-96
- Died: 25 December 1361; Seligenthal
- Noble family: Piast
- Spouse: Otto III, Duke of Bavaria
- Issue: Agnes of Bavaria; Henry XV, Duke of Bavaria
- Father: Henry III, Duke of Głogów
- Mother: Matilda of Brunswick-Lüneburg

Agnes of Głogów (Polish: Agnieszka głogowska; born between 1293 and 1296 – 25 December 1361, Seligenthal) was a member of the Głogów line of the Piast dynasty, the Duchess of Głogów by birth, as well as Duchess of Lower Bavaria and Countess of Hals through her marriage.

== Life ==
The parents of Agnes were Duke Henry III, Duke of Głogów and Żagań; and Matilda, daughter of Duke Albert of Brunswick-Lüneburg.

On 18 May 1309, Agnes married Duke Otto III of Lower Bavaria, who was about thirty years her senior and had been the King of Hungary from 1305 to 1307/08. His previous wife was Catherine of Habsburg, who died in 1282.

The marriage of Agnes with Otto III resulted in two children:

- Agnes (1310–1360), married to Henry IV, Count of Ortenburg
- Henry XV

Following the death of Otto III, the then Duke of Bavaria Louis sought guardianship over Otto's children, while Agnes and the nobles of Lower Bavaria preferred Frederick the Fair. The dispute culminated in the Battle of Gammelsdorf in 1313, in which Louis was victorious. Agnes then resided in Natternberg and Deggendorf, with income from estates in Deggendorf and Landau.

In 1319, Agnes married Alram, Count of Hals, with whom she had a daughter. After his death in 1331, she lived as a widow in the Seligenthal Monastery near Landshut until her own death in 1361. Her body was buried with her first husband Duke Otto III in the Seligenthal Monastery.
