= Henry IV the Faithful =

- Duke of Żagań
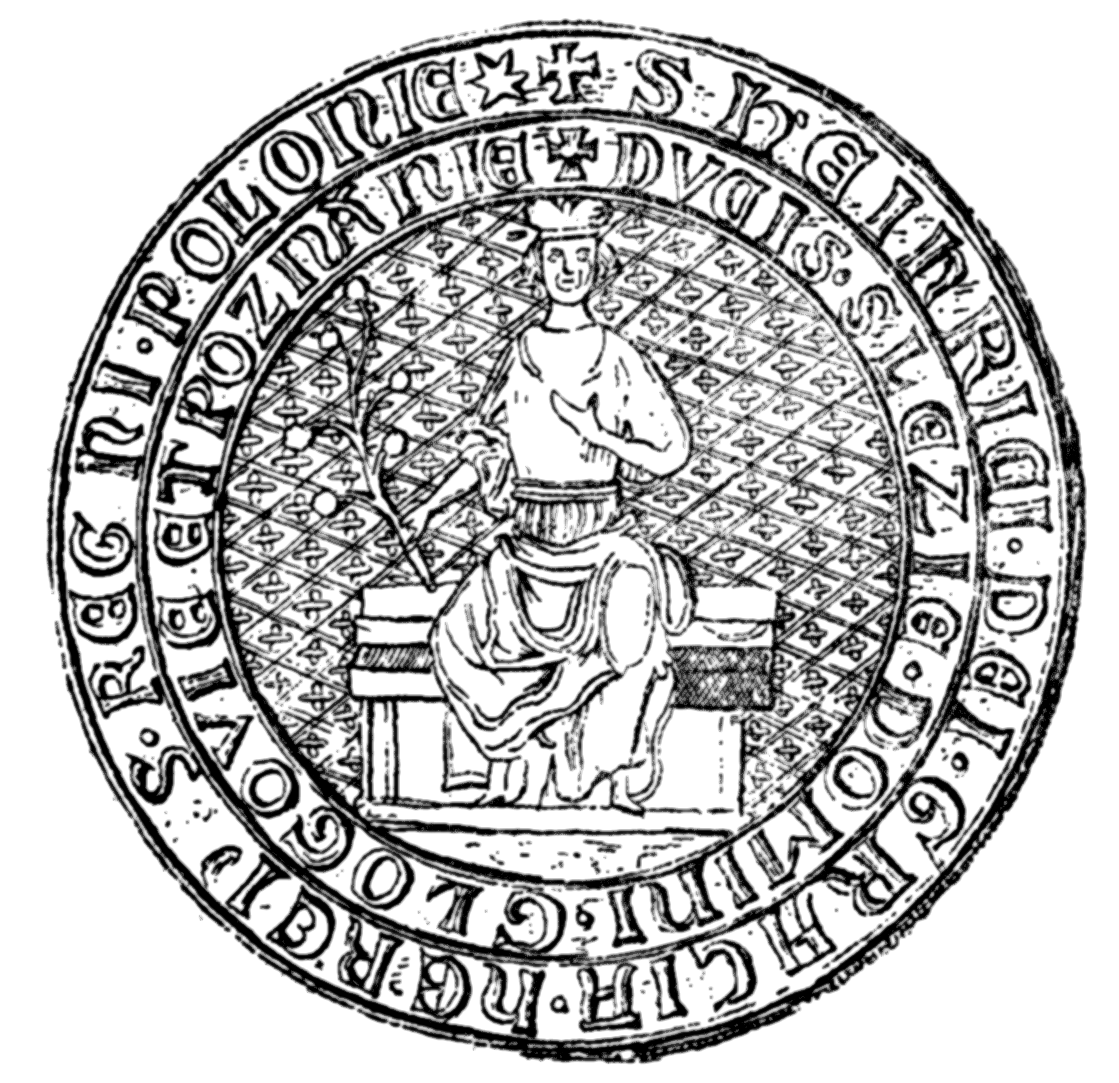
- Henry IV's seal, dated to 1308
- Born: c. 1292
- Died: 22 January 1342
- Noble family: Silesian Piasts of Głogów
- Spouse: Matilda of Brandenburg-Salzwedel
- Issue: Hedwig; Henry V of Iron; Salome; Agnes
- Father: Henry III, Duke of Głogów
- Mother: Matilda of Brunswick-Lüneburg

Henry IV (II) the Faithful (Polish: Henryk IV (II) Wierny) (c. 1292 – 22 January 1342) was a Duke of Żagań and parts of Greater Poland from 1309 until 1317 (with his brothers in all the lands except Głogów in different divisions among them), Duke of Głogów from 1318 until 1321 (with his brother as co-ruler) and sole ruler over Żagań from 1321 until his death.

He was the oldest son of Henry III (I), Duke of Głogów, by his wife Matilda, daughter of Albert I, Duke of Brunswick-Lüneburg. The nickname of "Faithful" (Wierny) only was given to him in the 14th-century chronicles.

== Life ==
Henry III prepared his eldest son in political affairs from his early years. In 1296 he took the four-year-old Henry with him to peace negotiations with the Duke Władysław I the Elbow-high of Kuyavia in Krzywiń. The young prince Henry had an important part in this meeting: Władysław I designated him his heir over the Duchy of Poznań in case he died without male issue; in addition, the Duke of Kuyavia was also forced to secure the succession of Henry III's descendants over all the Duchy of Głogów. However, this agreement was dismissed when Władysław I began to have sons, and in this way, the chances of inheritance of Henry IV over Poznań were small.

Henry III died on 9 December 1309 and Henry IV succeeded him over all his lands except Głogów, which was taken by his mother Matilda as her dower. Although he was seventeen years old, an age considered enough to rule alone according to the Piast dynasty customs, for unknown reasons, he remained, with his immediate younger brother Konrad, under the regency of their mother until 1312.

In 1312 Henry IV made the first division of the duchy: the eastern part, consisting of the towns of Oleśnica, Kluczbork, Kalisz and Gniezno was given to his younger brothers Konrad and Bolesław. Henry IV and his youngest brothers Jan and Przemko II retained Ścinawa, Żagań and Greater Poland.

The situation of the dukes of Głogów was difficult from the beginning of their rule, mostly because of the revived pretensions of Władysław I the Elbow-high over all Greater Poland and the inheritance of Henry IV Probus. For this reason, they decided to establish good relations with the Margraves of Brandenburg as a counterweight against their enemies; as a guarantee of these good relations, Henry IV married the daughter of the Margrave Herman, Matilda, in 1310. In the marriage contract the towns of Krosno Odrzańskie and Żagań were also pledged to the Margraviate, remaining in the hands of Brandenburg until 1319, when they came back to Henry III's sons. Thanks to this alliance with the House of Ascania Henry IV, along with younger brothers Konrad and Bolesław renounced in Berlin on 3 March 1310 their claims over Gdańsk Pomerania to the Margraves Waldemar of Brandenburg-Stendal and John V of Brandenburg-Salzwedel, who soon sold them for a large sum of money to the Teutonic knights.

In Greater Poland, the dissatisfaction against the government of Henry III's sons erupted in a revolt, which occurred in 1310. Henry IV suffered an unexpected defeat at the hands of insurgents in Klecki, but he managed to maintain his rule. The situation worsened two years later, when the dukes of Głogów were excommunicated by the Archbishop of Gniezno, Jakub Świnka and the Bishop of Poznań, Andrzej Zaremba. However, Władysław I the Elbow-high was only involved directly in the conflict in 1313, and could successfully take control over almost all Greater Poland one year later. Henry IV and his brothers only retained a fraction of the Greater Poland lands near the Obra River, which was ultimately lost in 1332 (with the exception of Wschowa, which was lost by Henry V of Iron). The sons of Henry III, after several attempts in the diplomatic sphere, and even with military invasions, tried to recover Greater Poland without success. To this end, they were involved in a series of unfavorable treaties with the Margraves of Brandenburg, hoping for their military support. Fortunately them, all these agreements were annulled after the extinction of the House of Ascania in its Brandenburg branch in 1320.

Also, the alliance with the dukes of Legnica proved to be totally inadequate. The war of 1312–1317 was finally ended with the settlement of 8 January 1317, by which the dukes of Głogów were forced to cede the territory between the Oder River and Wołów, with Uraz and Lubiąż.

After the death of their mother Matilda in 1318, Głogów was inherited by Henry IV and his brother Przemko II. Three years later, in 1321, the final territorial division was made between them: Przemko II received Głogów as sole ruler, Henry IV obtained Żagań and Jan obtained Ścinawa and Lubin. The other brothers, Konrad and Bolesław, retained Oleśnica and Namysłów. In 1322–1324, Henry IV controlled a portion of eastern Lubusz Land with the towns of Torzym and Sulęcin, and the Międzyrzecz castellany.

In 1322 the sons of Henry III joined the coalition of the Silesian dukes (Bernard II of Świdnica, Henry VI the Good and Bolesław III the Generous), whose head was Władysław I the Elbow-high, now King of Poland. This action weakened even more the power of the dukes of Głogów, who at the end also lost Namysłów.

One year later, in order to avoid the intervention of Emperor Louis IV, Henry IV put his Duchy under the protection of the Holy See. On 29 July 1326 Henry IV concluded a treaty with his brothers Jan of Ścinawa and Przemko II of Głogów, according to which if one of them died without male issue, the other two inherited his land. It seems that it was an attempt to restore the unity of the Duchy of Głogów.

After 1327 the political situation in Silesia was to change greatly. John of Luxemburg, King of Bohemia, began his direct interference over Upper Silesia. In 1329 he forced Henry IV, Bolesław III the Generous, Jan of Ścinawa and Konrad I of Oleśnica to become his vassals. From the sons of Henry III, only Przemko II of Głogów refused to accept the overlordship of the Bohemian king. With the support of King John, Henry IV tried unsuccessfully to claim the succession of the House of Ascania over Brandenburg.

In 1331 Przemko II of Głogów died without issue, poisoned by one of his vassals. According to the agreement previously concluded, his duchy was divided between Henry IV and Jan of Ścinawa. Przemko II's widow only retained the main city of Głogów and Bytom Odrzański. King John of Bohemia, however, had other plans; shortly after, he invaded the duchy, depriving the widow and brothers of their inheritance. In order to validate this action, the king purchased from Jan of Ścinawa his rights over the half of Głogów for 2,000 fines. King John's conduct infringed the rights of Przemko II's widow and Henry IV, who never could retake Głogów.

In order to prevent Jan from selling his Duchy of Ścinawa to Bohemia, on 25 July 1334 Henry IV and Konrad I entered into an arrangement with him, under which Jan was forbidden to sell any part of Ścinawa without the consent of his brothers. Finally, years later the brothers bought Jan his Duchy, which was returned to him only during his life. On 30 April 1341 Henry IV received from his brother Jan the town of Wschowa.

Henry IV died on 22 January 1342 in Żagan, and was buried in the local Augustinian church.

== Marriage and issue ==
By 5 January 1310, Henry IV married Matilda (c. 1296 – c. 31 March 1329), daughter of Herman, Margrave of Brandenburg-Salzwedel. They had four children:

1. Hedwig (b. ca. 1316 – d. 28 May? 1348), Abbess of Trzebnica.
2. Henry V of Iron (b. ca. 1319 – d. aft. 8 April 1369).
3. Salome (b. aft. 1320 – d. aft. 12 June 1359), married by 1335 to Henry II Reuss, Vogt of Plauen.
4. Agnes (b. ca. 1321 – d. 7 July 1362), married by 1332 to Duke Leszek of Racibórz and secondly by 1341 with Duke Louis I of Brzeg.

Henry IV the Faithful House of Piast Born: c. 1292 Died: 22 January 1342
Preceded by Henry III	Duke of Żagań with Konrad I, Bolesław, Jan and Przemko II (until 1321); 1309–1342	Succeeded by Henry V of Iron
Preceded by Henry III	Duke of Ścinawa with Konrad I, Bolesław, Jan and Przemko II; 1309–1317	Succeeded by Jan
Preceded by Henry III	Duke of Greater Poland; 1309–1314	Succeeded by Władysław I the Elbow-high
Preceded by Henry III	Duke of Poznań with Konrad I, Bolesław, Jan and Przemko II; 1309–1314	Succeeded by Władysław I the Elbow-high
Preceded by Henry III	Duke of Kalisz with Konrad I, Bolesław, Jan and Przemko II; 1309–1312	Succeeded by Konrad I and Bolesław
Preceded by Henry III	Duke of Gniezno with Konrad I, Bolesław, Jan and Przemko II; 1309–1312	Succeeded by Konrad I and Bolesław
Preceded by Henry III	Duke of Oleśnica with Konrad I, Bolesław, Jan and Przemko II; 1309–1312	Succeeded by Konrad I and Bolesław
Preceded by Henry III	Duke of Namysłów with Konrad I, Bolesław, Jan and Przemko II; 1309–1312	Succeeded by Konrad I and Bolesław
Preceded by Matilda	Duke of Glogów with Przemko II; 1318–1321	Succeeded by Przemko II
