= Matilda of Brunswick-Lüneburg =

German noblewoman (1276–1318)

- Duchess consort of Glogów
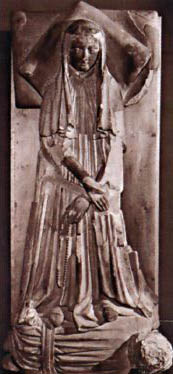
- Born: 1276
- Died: 26 April 1318 (aged 41–42)
- Family: Welf
- Spouse: Henry III, Duke of Głogów
- Issue: Henry IV the Faithful; Konrad I of Oleśnica; Bolesław of Oleśnica; Agnes of Głogów; Salome of Głogów; John of Ścinawa; Katharina of Głogów; Przemko II of Głogów; Hedwig of Głogów
- Father: Albert I, Duke of Brunswick
- Mother: Alessina of Montferrat

Matilda of Brunswick-Lüneburg (Polish: Matylda, German: Mechthild) (1276 – 26 April 1318) was a German noblewoman and member of the House of Welf. She was a Duchess of Glogów by marriage to Henry III of Glogów. She was the regent of the Duchy of Glogów after the death of her spouse between 1309 and 1312.

She was the seventh child and only daughter of Albert I, Duke of Brunswick-Lüneburg, by his second wife Alessina, daughter of Margrave Boniface II of Montferrat.

== Life ==
In March 1291 Matilda married Duke Henry III of Glogów. With this union, Henry III gained an important ally in his fight against Henry V the Fat, Duke of Legnica.

During her marriage, Matilda gave birth to nine children, five sons and four daughters. After Henry III's death in 1309, and despite the fact that her eldest son Henry IV the Faithful was of legal age to rule by himself, Matilda became the regent of her husband's duchies (except Glogów, which was given to her by Henry III in his will as her dower) until 1312.

=== Issue ===
1. Henry IV the Faithful (born c. 1292 – died 22 January 1342).
2. Konrad I (born c. 1294 – died 22 December 1366).
3. Bolesław (born c. 1295 – died before 23 April 1321).
4. Agnes (born c. 1296 – died 25 December 1361), married firstly on 18 May 1309 to Otto III, Duke of Bavaria and secondly in 1329 to Alram, Count of Hals.
5. Salome (born c. 1297 – died before 9 December 1309).
6. Jan (born c. 1298 – died by 19 May 1365).
7. Katharina (born c. 1300 – died 5 December 1323/26), married firstly before 24 March 1317 to John V, Margrave of Brandenburg-Salzwedel and secondly by 27 January 1319 to John III, Count of Holstein-Plön.
8. Przemko II (born c. 1305 – died 11 January 1331).
9. Hedwig (born c. 1308 – died before December 1309).

On her death, Glogów was inherited by her sons Henry IV and Przemko II as co-rulers until 1321, when they divided their domains and Przemko II retained Glogów as sole ruler.

== Sources ==
- Rossignol, Sébastien (2025). Medieval Silesia: An Inclusive History. Taylor & Francis. ISBN 9781040328453.

Matilda of Brunswick-Lüneburg House of Welf Born: 1276 Died: 26 April 1318
Preceded by Henry III	Duchess of Glogów; 1309–1318	Succeeded by Henry IV the Faithful and Przemko II
