= Konrad I of Oleśnica =

Konrad I
- Duke of Żagań, Ścinawa, Oleśnica, Namysłów, Gniezno, Kalisz
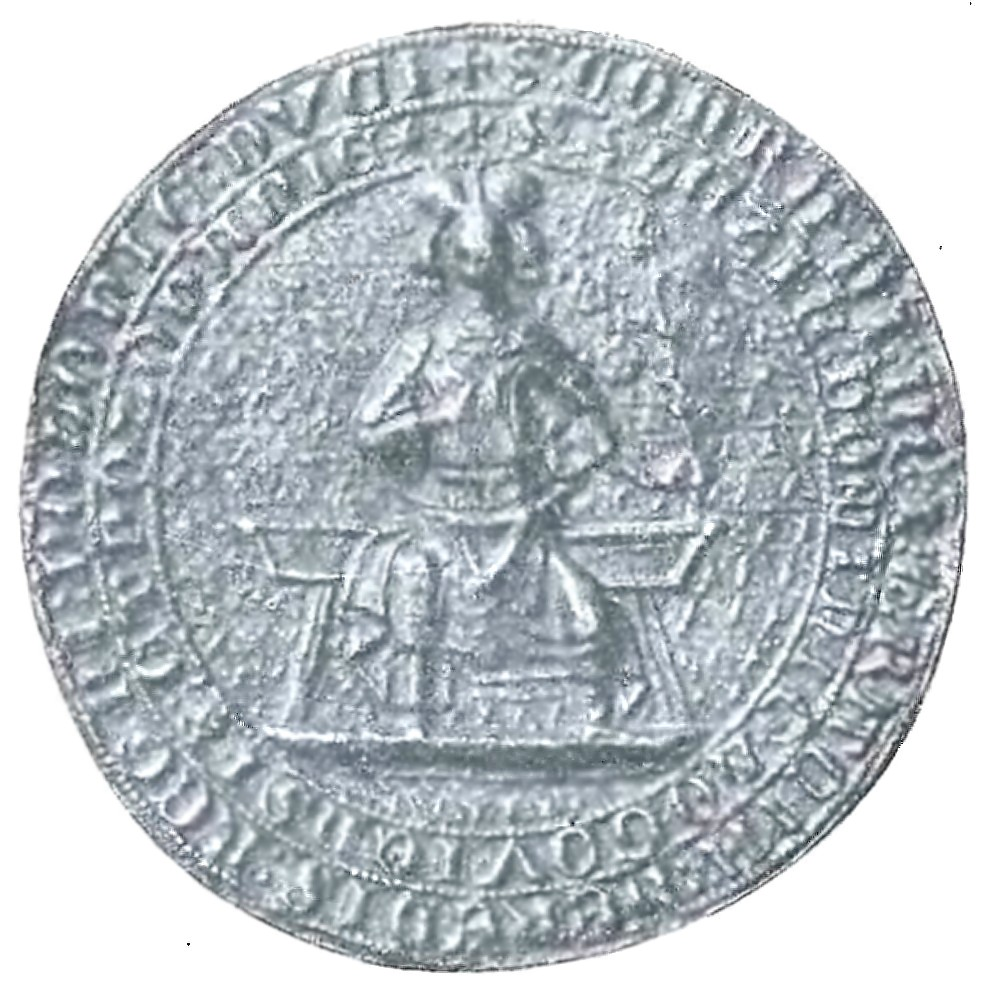
- Seal of Konrad I Oleśnicki from 1312
- Born: c. 1294
- Died: 22 December 1366
- Noble family: Silesian Piasts of Oleśnica
- Spouse: Elisabeth of Wrocław
- Issue: Hedwig; Konrad II the Gray
- Father: Henry III, Duke of Silesia-Glogau
- Mother: Matilda of Brunswick-Lüneburg

Konrad I of Oleśnica (c. 1294 – 22 December 1366) was a Duke of Żagań and Ścinawa during 1309–1312 (with his brothers as co-rulers), Duke of Oleśnica, Namysłów, Gniezno and Kalisz during 1312–1313 (with his brother as co-ruler), Duke of Kalisz during 1313–1314 (alone), Duke of Namysłów from 1313 (alone) and Duke of Oleśnica from 1321 until his death (alone).

He was the second son of Henry III (I), Duke of Głogów, by his wife Matilda, daughter of Albert I, Duke of Brunswick-Lüneburg.

== Life ==
After his father's early death in 1309, Konrad I succeeded him in all his lands with his brothers as co-rulers; but, because he was a minor at that time, he remained under the care of his mother and older brother Henry IV the Faithful until 1312.

Despite his minority, on 3 March 1310 in Berlin, Konrad I was present with his brothers Henry IV and Bolesław, when they solemnly renounced their rights over Gdańsk Pomerania to Brandenburg in exchange for a monetary compensation. In order to have good relations with the House of Ascania, they pledge the towns of Krosno Odrzańskie and Żagań to them (they will recover these territories in 1319).

On 29 February 1312, was made the formal division of the Duchy. Konrad I and Bolesław obtained as co-rulers the eastern part of the Duchy (Oleśnica, Namysłów and Kluczbork), and the regions of Kalisz and Gniezno. Henry IV, Jan and Przemko II retained the regions of Ścinawa, Żagań and Greater Poland. Their mother Matilda kept Głogów as her dower. One year later, in 1313, Konrad I and Bolesław decided to divide their own domains: Konrad I received Namysłów and Kalisz.

The situation of Henry III's sons was precarious. In 1313, Konrad I lost Kalisz after a revolt of the nobility. The same year, the Dukes of Legnica obtained Uraz. In 1314, supported by the local nobility who opposes to territorial division of Henry III, Władysław I the Elbow-high take almost all Greater Poland.

In 1321, when his brother Bolesław died without issue, Konrad I inherited Oleśnica. While Władysław I the Elbow-high and Bolesław III the Generous engaged in looting in the territory of the Duchy of Oleśnica (from 1321 to 1323), Konrad married with Elisabeth, daughter of Henry VI the Good, removing any threat from Duchy of Wrocław.

A peace treaty with Władysław I and Bolesław III was concluded in Kraków on 10 August 1323. Konrad I received Wołów, Lubiąż and Smogorzów, but in exchange was forced to give Namysłów to Bolesław III. In 1328, he paid homage to King John of Bohemia.

In summer 1343, King Casimir III the Great of Poland launched an attack against Konrad I, Jan of Ścinawa and Henry V of Iron. Konrad I inflicted defeated the Polish army which was in the walls of Oleśnica and concludes a peace treaty with King Casimir III. In 1345, Conrad and his nephew Henry V trying unsuccessfully to recover Wschowa from Poland. In retaliation, the King of Poland launches an attack against the Duchy of Oleśnica.

In 1355 Konrad I took control over the Duchy of Koźle (Kosel). On 8 December 1357, the Duchy of Bytom (Beuthen) was divided between him and Duke Casimir I of Cieszyn. The following year, he bought Milicz to the Bishopric of Wrocław.

In 1361, after the death of Jan de Ścinawa, Konrad I and Henry V entered in a dispute over his inheritance. The conflict was resolved in 1365 through the mediation of Ludwik I the Fair, Duke of Brzeg.

Konrad I died on 22 December 1366 and was buried in the Chapel of St. Hedwig in the monastery of Trzebnica.

== Marriages and Issue ==
By 10 January 1322 Konrad I married firstly with Elisabeth (b. ca. 1311 – d. 20 February? 1328), daughter of Henry VI the Good, Duke of Wrocław. They had no children.

By 2 March 1333 Konrad I married secondly with Euphemia (b. 1313? – d. 3 January 1378), daughter of Władysław, Duke of Koźle-Bytom. They had two children:

1. Hedwig (b. ca. 25 March 1338 – d. ca. 1351), married by 11 August 1345 to Duke Nikolaus II of Opawa (Troppau).
2. Konrad II the Gray (b. ca. 1340 – d. 10 June 1403).

Konrad I of Oleśnica House of Piast Born: c. 1294 Died: 22 December 1366
Preceded by Henry III	Duke of Namysłów with Henry IV (until 1312), Bolesław (until 1313), Jan (until 1312) and Przemko II (until 1312); 1309–1323	Succeeded by Bolesław III the Generous
Preceded by Henry III	Duke of Żagań with Henry IV, Bolesław, Jan and Przemko II; 1309–1312	Succeeded by Henry IV the Faithful; Jan; Przemko II
Preceded by Henry III	Duke of Ścinawa with Henry IV, Bolesław, Jan and Przemko II; 1309–1312	Succeeded by Henry IV the Faithful; Jan; Przemko II
Preceded by Henry III	Duke of Poznań with Henry IV, Bolesław, Jan and Przemko II; 1309–1312	Succeeded by Henry IV the Faithful; Jan; Przemko II
Preceded by Henry III	Duke of Kalisz with Henry IV (until 1312), Bolesław (until 1313), Jan (until 1312) and Przemko II (until 1312); 1309–1314	Succeeded by Władysław I the Elbow-high
Preceded by Henry III	Duke of Gniezno with Henry IV (until 1312), Bolesław, Jan (until 1312) and Przemko II (until 1312); 1309–1313	Succeeded by Bolesław
Preceded by Henry III	Duke of Oleśnica with Henry IV (until 1312), Bolesław, Jan (until 1312) and Przemko II (until 1312); 1309–1313	Succeeded by Bolesław
Preceded by Bolesław	Duke of Oleśnica; 1321–1366	Succeeded by Konrad II the Gray
Preceded by Bolesław	Duke of Koźle; 1355–1366	Succeeded by Konrad II the Gray
Preceded by Margareta	Duke of Bytom (1/2); 1357–1366	Succeeded by Konrad II the Gray
