= Bolesław of Oleśnica =

Bolesław
- Duke of Oleśnica, Namysłów, Gniezno and Kalisz
- Coat-of-arms of Silesia
- Born: c. 1295
- Died: before 23 April 1321
- Noble family: Silesian Piasts of Głogów
- Father: Henry III, Duke of Silesia-Glogau
- Mother: Matilda of Brunswick-Lüneburg

Bolesław of Oleśnica (Polish: Bolesław oleśnicki; c. 1295 – before 23 April 1321), was a Duke of Żagań, Ścinawa, etc., during 1309–1312 (with his brothers as co-rulers), Duke of Oleśnica, Namysłów, Gniezno and Kalisz during 1312–1313 (with his brother as co-ruler), Duke of Gniezno during 1313–1314 (alone) and sole Duke of Oleśnica from 1313 to his death.

He was the third son of Henry III (I), Duke of Głogów, by his wife Matilda, daughter of Albert I, Duke of Brunswick-Lüneburg.

== Life ==
At the time of his father's death in 1309, Bolesław succeeded him as ruler of all his lands together with his brothers as co-rulers; however, because he was a minor, was placed under the care of his mother until his majority in 1312. Despite he was legally a minor, he was present with his older brothers Henry IV the Faithful and Konrad I in their negotiations in Berlin, where on 3 March 1310, they solemnly renounced to their rights over Gdańsk Pomerania to Brandenburg in exchange to a monetary compensation (due to the insolvency of the princes of Głogów, they were forced to pledge to the House of Ascania the towns of Krosno Odrzańskie and Żagań, who were only recovered in 1319.

On 29 February 1312 was made first division of the Duchy: Bolesław and Konrad received the Duchies of Gniezno-Kalisz and Oleśnica-Namysłów as a co-rulers, but one year later, in 1313, they decided to divide their domains: Bolesław obtained Oleśnica and Gniezno as a sole ruler.

Since the beginning of their reign, Henry III's sons faced several complications. Firstly, the pretensions of Władysław I the Elbow-high and the princes of Legnica-Brzeg-Wrocław (Bolesław III the Generous and Henry VI the Good). The result of the consequent war was that Bolesław, together with his brothers, had been forced to given the towns of Uraz, Wołów and Lubiąż to Bolesław III and Henry VI and almost all the Greater Poland lands to Władysław I. These losses originated further rebellions of the Greater Poland inhabitants, who were complete dissatisfied with the multiple government of the brothers.

Bolesław died unexpectedly by April 1321 year and was buried in the Piast Mausoleum in the Cistercian monastery of Trzebnica. Unmarried and childless, on his death his domains were inherited by his brother Konrad I.

| Preceded by Henry III | Duke of Oleśnica with Henry IV (until 1312), Konrad I, Jan (until 1312) and Przemko II (until 1312); 1309–1321 | Succeeded by Konrad I |
| Preceded by Henry III | Duke of Namysłów with Henry IV (until 1312), Konrad I, Jan (until 1312) and Przemko II (until 1312); 1309–1313 | Succeeded by Konrad I |
| Preceded by Henry III | Duke of Kalisz with Henry IV (until 1312), Konrad I, Jan (until 1312) and Przemko II (until 1312); 1309–1313 | Succeeded by Konrad I |
| Preceded by Henry III | Duke of Gniezno with Henry IV (until 1312), Konrad I (until 1313), Jan (until 1312) and Przemko II (until 1312); 1309–1314 | Succeeded by Władysław I the Elbow-high |
| Preceded by Henry III | Duke of Żagań with Henry IV, Konrad I, Jan and Przemko II; 1309–1312 | Succeeded by Henry IV the Faithful; Jan; Przemko II |
| Preceded by Henry III | Duke of Ścinawa with Henry IV, Konrad I, Jan and Przemko II; 1309–1312 | Succeeded by Henry IV the Faithful; Jan; Przemko II |
| Preceded by Henry III | Duke of Poznań with Henry IV, Konrad I, Jan and Przemko II; 1309–1312 | Succeeded by Henry IV the Faithful; Jan; Przemko II |
