= John of Ścinawa =

Polish Duke

- Duke of Poznań and Ścinawa
- Coat-of-arms of Silesia
- Born: c. 1298
- Died: by 19 May 1365
- Noble family: Silesian Piasts of Głogów
- Spouse: Margaret of Pomerania
- Father: Henry III, Duke of Głogów
- Mother: Matilda of Brunswick-Lüneburg

John of Ścinawa (Polish: Jan ścinawski; c. 1298 – by 19 May 1365) was a Duke of Żagań, Ścinawa, etc. during 1309–1317 (with his brothers as co-rulers), Duke of Poznań during 1312–1314 (with his brothers) and sole Duke of Ścinawa after 1317.

He was the fourth son of Henry III (I), Duke of Głogów, by his wife Matilda, daughter of Albert I, Duke of Brunswick-Lüneburg.

== Life ==
At the time of his father's death, John was still a minor, and therefore he remained under the care of mother and his older brother Henry IV the Faithful.

On 29 February 1312 was made the first division of the Duchy, under which John, Henry IV and Przemko II received Żagań, Ścinawa and Poznań; also, they received the promise of inheritance over Głogów after the death of their mother Matilda, who held this land as her dower. The rest of the lands were taken by his other brothers Conrad I and Bolesław.

The period of joint rule of the princes faced several difficulties, the most importante of them was the loss of part of Greater Poland in favor of Władysław I the Elbow-high. At the same time they also lost part of the territories acquired by the father to the Dukes of Legnica.

In 1317, John received from his brother Henry IV the districts of Ścinawa, Góra and Lubin as his own independent Duchy.

In the internal politics, John's participation was almost null. The Duke of Ścinawa interferences were exclusively in contact with his brothers. On 29 July 1326 Jan concluded a treaty with Henry IV and the childless Przemko II according to which if one of them died without male issue, the other two inherited his land. At the same time, due to his hostile relations with the Dukes of Legnica, John made contacts with Poland.

In 1328, John supported the inhabitants of Brzeg-Legnica in the fight against Bolesław III the Generous and Henry VI the Good; however, this war caused significant areas of devastation outside Lower Silesia.

On 29 April 1329, John succumbed to the pressures from the King John of Bohemia and paid homage to him in Wrocław. The Bohemian King, however, guaranteed to him the right to decide the fate of his lands without the consent of his brothers.

At the beginning of 1331 Przemko II of Głogów died, probably poisoned by his vassals. According to the treaty signed between the brothers in 1326, all his lands (with the exception of the city of Głogów, who passed to Przemko II's widow Constance as her dower) were divided between John and Henry IV. Unexpectedly, these plans were changed by King John, who shortly after invaded Głogów and took control over the Duchy, forced Constance to flee and John to sold him for 2,000 grzywna his rights over the half of Przemko II's lands. At the same time, Władysław I the Elbow-high take advantage with the reigning confusion and occupied the Greater Poland lands who still remained under the hands of Henry III's sons after 1314. Despite the interference of King John, the Duke of Ścinawa participated in his expedition against Poland and in the unsuccessful siege of Poznań.

In order to prevent that John could sold Ścinawa to Bohemia, on 25 July 1334 Henry IV and Conrad I entered into an arrangement with him, under which John was forbidden to sold any part of Ścinawa without the consent of his brothers. Despite this John, with constant financial problems, tried to sell his Duchy. On 29 January 1336, during a visit to Prague, John decided to transfer Ścinawa after his death to King John in exchange for the rule over Głogów during his lifetime. Only the strong protests of his brothers eventually caused the annulment of the treaty with Bohemia. However, Henry IV and Conrad I couldn't stop John when he pledged Lubin to Bolesław III the Generous.

In order to avoid sells or divisions, on 27 August 1337, Henry IV and Conrad I purchased to John all his Duchy of Ścinawa, but he could retain the sovereignty during his life. The sell was confirmed by the King of Bohemia. The price, however, was decided by King John, and was the abandonment of the previously pledged Lubin. Despite all these efforts to maintain the unity of the Duchy, shortly after, and probably with the consent of the brothers, John sold the Bohemia Góra Śląska (the town was soon recovered in unknown circumstances, and re-sold in 1345 for 1,500 fines).

During the 1340s, 1350s and 1360s, John sold his Duchy piece after piece first to his brother Henry IV and later to his son Henry V of Iron. And so on 30 April 1341 he sold Wschowa to Henry V, in 1353 the castle of Ryczyn, half of Ścinawa and the territory between the Odra and Barycz in 1358 and Polkowice in 1361.

In 1343, during the war between Henry V and King Casimir III the Great, John supported militarily his nephew, so that when the Polish army entered in Silesia, Ścinawa was sieged and plundered.

By 14 January 1316, John married Margaret (b. 1286/88 – d. bef. 25 July 1334), daughter of Bogislaw IV, Duke of Pomerania, and widow of Nicholas I the Child, Lord of Rostock. They had no children.

John died between 1361 and 1365 and was buried in the monastery of Lubiąż. After his death his lands were divided between his brother Conrad I and his nephew Henry V.

Preceded by Henry III	Duke of Ścinawa with Henry IV (until 1312), Konrad I (until 1312), Bolesław (until 1312) and Przemko II (until 1317); 1309–1365	Succeeded by Henry V of Iron and Bolko II the Small
Preceded by Henry III	Duke of Żagań with Henry IV, Conrad I (until 1312), Bolesław (until 1312) and Przemko II; 1309–1317	Succeeded by Henry IV the Faithful and Przemko II
Preceded by Henry III	Duke of Poznań with Henry IV, Conrad I (until 1312), Bolesław (until 1312) and Przemko II; 1309–1314	Succeeded by Władysław I the Elbow-high
Preceded by Henry III	Duke of Oleśnica with Henry IV, Konrad I, Bolesław and Przemko II; 1309–1312	Succeeded by Konrad I and Bolesław
Preceded by Henry III	Duke of Namysłów with Henry IV, Conrad I, Bolesław and Przemko II; 1309–1312	Succeeded by Konrad I and Bolesław
Preceded by Henry III	Duke of Kalisz with Henry IV, Conrad I, Bolesław and Przemko II; 1309–1312	Succeeded by Konrad I and Bolesław
Preceded by Henry III	Duke of Gniezno with Henry IV, Conrad I, Bolesław and Przemko II; 1309–1312	Succeeded by Konrad I and Bolesław
