= Andrzej Zaremba =

Polish Catholic priest

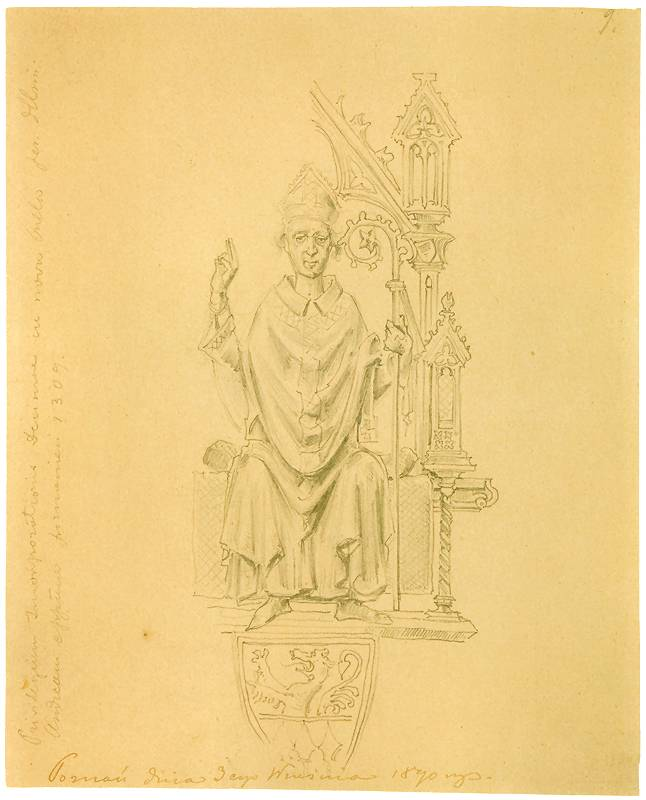
Andrzej Zaremba.

Andrzej Zaremba from Czermina of the Zaremba coat of arms (died 1317 or 1318) was bishop of Poznań.

Son of Szymon, castellan of Gniezno, brother of the cousin of Kalisz, Mikołaj Jankowic and Sędziwój of Jarocin. A representative of one of the most powerful families of Wielkopolska in the 13th and 14th centuries. No mention has been made of his childhood and studies. For the first time he appears in the sources as a chaplain of Bolesław the Pious. In 1280 he became the chancellor of Przemyśl II, and in 1282 he was also Archdiocese of Kalisz.

After the death of the king, he works in the office of Władysław Łokietek. In a document from 1297, he appears as a provost of the Poznań chapter.

== Episcopal career ==
In the same year, he left the court of Łokietek to embrace the Poznań bishop's throne. In 1298 he was the main negotiator of the settlement in Kościan, between Łokietek, Henry III Głogowczyk and wielkopolskie Wielkieks, who in exchange for the support of Łokietek's embrace of the Crown left by Przemysl guaranteed a number of privileges to Poznań bishops, including the title of the Crown Chancellor and the Poznań throne. Soon after, along with the majority of the magnates of Wielkopolska, he found himself in opposition to Łokietek. In 1299, Władysław Łokietek placed the interdict in the diocese of Poznań (by some historians, this fact is questioned). After that he became one of the main architects of Wenceslas II's coronation as the king of Poland. After the death of Wacław II, and soon after him Wacław III supported in the summer of 1306 Henryk Głogowczyk, who mastered Greater Poland. The support of the Silesian Piasts of German and Silesian influences in Wielkopolska quickly caused that the majority of the nobles stood in opposition to Henry and his sons. Jakub Świnka and Andrzej Zaremba were in the forefront of this movement. In 1312, both priests laid a curse on Henryk and his sons, which accelerated the end of their rule over Wielkopolska. In 1313 bp. Andrzej ultimately spoke on the side of Łokietek.

During the office of the Poznań Bishop, he reformed the archdiocese of Poznań, dividing it into three smaller ones and planning to create a fourth one in the lands located on the northern bank of the Noteć. He issued laws that would put an end to the distribution of tithing from both new parishes and help to regain those assignments that his predecessors left behind. In the episcopal administration, he created a permanent general office, settled matters of cathedral vicars, created their permanent college, and recognized the bishops' chancellors as prelates. He also issued, in 1302, permission for an uprising at a Poznań friend.
