= List of Polish royal consorts =

Royal consorts in Poland

The wives of the rulers of the Kingdom of Poland were duchesses or queens consort of Poland. List does not include queens regnant and ruling queens's husbands who were kings jure uxoris.

== Wives of early Polish monarchs ==
=== Duchesses of the Polans ===
Picture	Name	Father	Birth	Marriage	Became duchess	Ceased to be consort	Death	Spouse
	Doubravka of Bohemia	Boleslaus I, Duke of Bohemia (Přemyslids)	925	965		977		Mieszko I
	Oda of Haldensleben	Dietrich, Margrave of the Nordmark (Billung)	c. 960	ca. 978		25 May 992 husband's death	1023	Mieszko I
	Emnilda of Lusatia	Dobromir of Lusatia	c. 970	c. 987	25 May 992 husband's accession	1017		Bolesław I
	Oda of Meissen	Eckard I, Margrave of Meissen (Ekkehardiner)	c. 996	3 February 1018		aft. 1018		Bolesław I

== Royal consorts of Kingdom of Poland and Crown of the Kingdom of Poland ==
=== Piast dynasty (1) ===
Picture	Name	Father	Birth	Marriage	Became duchess/queen consort	Coronation as Queen	Ceased to be Consort	Death	Spouse
	Oda of Meissen	Eckard I, Margrave of Meissen (Ekkehardiner)	c. 996	3 February 1018	3 February 1018 (Duchess); 1025 (Queen)	1025 in Gniezno Cathedral (disputed)	17 June 1025 husband's death	aft. 1025	Bolesław I
	Richeza of Lotharingia	Ezzo, Count Palatine of Lotharingia (Ezzonids)	995 or 1000	1013	17 June 1025 husband's accession	25 December 1025 in Gniezno Cathedral	1031 husband's deposition	21 March 1063	Mieszko II, 1st reign
	Richeza of Lotharingia	Ezzo, Count Palatine of Lotharingia (Ezzonids)	995 or 1000	1013	1032 husband's restoration	crowned during first tenure	10 May 1034 husband's death	21 March 1063	Mieszko II, 2nd reign
	Dobroniega Maria of Kiev	Vladimir I of Kiev (Rurikids)	1010	1040		never crowned	28 November 1058 husband's death	1087	Casimir I
	Unnamed	Unknown	1047?	1068?	1068? (Duchess); 1076 (Queen)	25 December 1076 in Gniezno Cathedral (possibly)	1079 husband's deposition	aft. 1089	Bolesław II
	Judith of Bohemia	Vratislaus II of Bohemia (Přemyslids)	1056/58	1080		never crowned	25 December 1086		Władysław I
	Judith of Swabia	Henry III, Holy Roman Emperor (Liudolfings)	1047/1054	1089		never crowned	4 June 1102 husband's death	14 March (aft. 1105?)	Władysław I
	Zbyslava of Kiev	Sviatopolk II of Kiev (Rurikids)	c. 1085/90	16 November 1102		never crowned	ca. 1112		Bolesław III
	Salomea of Berg	Henry, Count of Berg (Berg-Schelklingen)	1093/1101	1115		never crowned	28 October 1138 husband's death	27 July 1144	Bolesław III
	Agnes of Babenberg	Leopold III, Margrave of Austria (Babenberg)	1111	1125	28 October 1138 husband's accession	never crowned	1146 husband's deposition	25 January 1157	Władysław II
	Viacheslava of Novgorod	Vsevolod of Pskov (Rurikids)	1125	1137	1146 husband's accession	never crowned	15 March 1162?		Bolesław IV
	Maria	probably Rostislav I of Kiev (Rurikids)	ca. 1140	ca. 1165		never crowned	aft. 1173		Bolesław IV
	Eudoxia of Kiev	Iziaslav II of Kiev (Rurikids)	ca. 1131	1154	1173 husband's accession	never crowned	1177 husband's deposition	aft. 1187	Mieszko III, 1st reign
	Helen of Znojmo	Conrad II of Znojmo (Přemyslids)	1140 or 1145	1163	1177 husband's accession	never crowned	1190 husband's deposition	1206	Casimir II, 1st reign
	Helen of Znojmo	Conrad II of Znojmo (Přemyslids)	1140 or 1145	1163	1190 husband's restoration	never crowned	5 May 1194 husband's death	1206	Casimir II, 2nd reign
	Lucia of Rügen	Jaromar I, Prince of Rügen (Rügen)	?	1186	13 March 1202 husband's accession	never crowned	1206 husband's deposition	?1231?	Władysław III, 1st reign
	Grzymislawa of Luck	Ingvar of Kiev (Rurikids)	?	1207		never crowned	1210 husband's deposition		Leszek I, 3rd reign
	Ludmila	probably Soběslav I, Duke of Bohemia (Přemyslids)	?	1170/1178	9 June 1210 husband's accession	never crowned	20 October 1210		Mieszko IV
	Grzymislawa of Luck	Ingvar of Kiev (Rurikids)	?	1207	1211 husband's restoration	never crowned	1227 husband's death		Leszek I, 4th reign
	Lucia of Rügen	Jaromar I, Prince of Rügen (Rügen)	?	1186	1227 husband's restoration	never crowned	1229 husband's deposition	?1231?	Władysław III, 2nd reign
	Agafia of Rus	Svyatoslav III Igorevich (Rurikids)	?	?	?	never crowned	?	?	Konrad I, 1st reign
	Hedwig of Andechs	Berthold IV, Duke of Merania (Andechs)	1174	around 1188	1232 husband's accession	never crowned	19 March 1238 husband's death	15 October 1243	Henry I
	Anne of Bohemia	Ottokar I of Bohemia(Přemyslids)	1204	1218	19 March 1238 husband's accession	never crowned	9 April 1241 husband's death	23 June 1265	Henry II
	Agafia of Rus	Svyatoslav III Igorevich (Rurikids)	?	?	?	never crowned	?	?	Konrad I, 2nd reign
	Cunegunda of Hungary	Béla IV of Hungary (Árpád)	5 March 1224	?	9 April 1241 husband's accession	never crowned	7 December 1279 husband's death	24 July 1292	Bolesław V
	Agrippina of Slavonia	Rostislav Mikhailovich (Rurikids)	1248	?	?	never crowned	30 September 1288 husband's death	1309	Leszek II
	Matilda of Brandenburg	Otto V, Margrave of Brandenburg-Salzwedel (Ascania)	1270	1287/88	1288 husband's accession	never crowned	23 June 1290 husband's death	bef. 1 June 1298	Henry IV
	Ryksa of Sweden	Valdemar of Sweden (Bjälbo)	before 1273	11 October 1285	23 June 1290 husband's accession	never crowned	between 1 September 1288 - 19 April 1293		Przemysł II
	Margaret of Brandenburg	Albert III, Margrave of Brandenburg-Salzwedel (Ascania)	1270/1281	1289/1295	1289/1295 (duchess) 26 June 1295 (queen)	26 June 1295 in Gniezno Cathedral	8 February 1296 husband's death	after 1314	Przemysł II

=== Přemyslid dynasty ===
Picture	Name	Father	Birth	Marriage	Became queen consort	Coronation as queen	Ceased to be consort	Death	Spouse
	Judith of Habsburg	Rudolph I of Germany (Habsburg)	1271	24 January 1285	1296 husband's accession, although not crowned	never crowned	21 May 1297		Wenceslaus II
	Elisabeth Richeza of Poland	Przemysł II (Piast)	1 September 1286	1300		26 May 1303 in Prague Cathedral	21 June 1305 husband's death	18 October 1335	Wenceslaus II
	Viola of Teschen	Mieszko I, Duke of Teschen (Piast)	1291	5 October 1305		never crowned	4 August 1306 husband's death	21 September 1317	Wenceslaus III

=== Piast dynasty (2) ===
Picture	Name	Father	Birth	Marriage	Became duchess/ queen consort	Coronation as Queen	Ceased to be consort	Death	Spouse
	Hedwig of Kalisz	Bolesław the Pious (Piast)	1266	1293	1306 (Duchess) husband's accession 20 January 1320 (Queen) husband's accession	20 January 1320 in Wawel Cathedral	2 March 1333 husband's death	10 December 1339	Władysław I
	Aldona Anna of Lithuania	Gediminas (Gediminids)	c. 1309	30 April or 16 October 1325	2 March 1333 husband's accession as king	25 April 1333 in Wawel Cathedral	26 May 1339		Casimir III
	Adelaide of Hesse	Henry II, Landgrave of Hesse (Hesse)	1324	29 September 1341 in Poznań Cathedral			29 September 1365 annulled (disputed)	1371	Casimir III
	Krystyna Rokiczana	Wacław of Praga	Unknown	In or after 1356	Did not (morganatic marriage)	never crowned	Unknown (Note: Krystyna and Casimir III had separated before 25 February 1365, when he married Hedwig of Sagan. However, it's unknown whether their marriage was ever legally dissolved or if she died prior to the King's wedding with a new queen.)	Unknown	Casimir III
	Hedwig of Żagań	Henry V of Iron (Piast)	c. 1350	25 February 1365		Presumably the day of marriage in Wschowa	5 November 1370 husband's death	1390	Casimir III

=== Angevin dynasty ===
Picture	Name	Father	Birth	Marriage	Became queen/king consort	Coronation	Ceased to be consort	Death	Spouse
	Elizabeth of Bosnia	Stephen II, Ban of Bosnia (Kotromanić)	1340	20 June 1353	5 November 1370 husband's accession	never crowned	10 September 1382 husband's death	16 January 1387	Louis
	William of Austria	Leopold III, Duke of Austria	1370	1378	Did not (marriage not recognized in Poland)	never crowned	before or at 18 February 1386 marriage annulled	15 July 1406	Jadwiga

=== Jagiellon dynasty ===
Picture	Name	Father	Birth	Marriage	Became queen consort	Coronation as Queen	Ceased to be Consort	Death	Spouse
	Anna of Celje	William, Count of Celje (Celje)	1381	19 January 1402		25 February 1403 in Wawel Cathedral	21 May 1416		Władysław II
	Elisabeth of Pilica	Otton of Pilica, Voivode of Sandomierz (Pilica of Sandomierz)	1370/1380	2 May 1417		19 November 1417 in Wawel Cathedral	12 May 1420		Władysław II
	Sophia of Halshany	Andrew of Halshany (Olshanski)	1405	24 or 7 February 1422		12 February 1424 in Wawel Cathedral	1 June 1434 husband's death	21 September 1461	Władysław II
	Elisabeth of Austria	Albert II of Germany (Habsburg)	1435/36/possibly 1437	10 March 1454 in Wawel Cathedral			7 June 1492 husband's death	30 August 1505	Casimir IV
	Helena of Moscow	Ivan III of Russia (Rurikids)	19 May 1476	18 February 1495	12 December 1501 husband's ascession	Never crowned	19 August 1506 husband's death	20 January 1513	Alexander
	Barbara Zápolya	Stephen Zápolya (Zápolya)	1495	8 February 1512 in Wawel Cathedral			2 October 1515		Sigismund I
	Bona Sforza	Gian Galeazzo Sforza (Sforza)	13 February 1495	18 April 1518 in Wawel Cathedral			1 April 1548 husband's death	7 November 1558	Sigismund I
	Elisabeth of Austria	Ferdinand I, Holy Roman Emperor (Habsburg)	9 July 1526	5 May 1543		8 May 1543 in Wawel Cathedral	15 June 1545		Sigismund II Augustus
	Barbara Radziwiłł	Jerzy Radziwiłł (Radziwiłł)	6 December 1520/1523	July/August 1547	17 April 1548 proclaimed by her husband	7 December 1550 in Wawel Cathedral	8 May 1551		Sigismund II Augustus
	Catherine of Austria	Ferdinand I, Holy Roman Emperor (Habsburg)	15 September 1533	23 June 1553		30 June 1553 in Wawel Cathedral	28 February 1572		Sigismund II Augustus

== Royal consorts of the Polish–Lithuanian Commonwealth ==
Picture	Name	Father	Birth	Marriage	Became queen consort	Coronation as Queen	Ceased to be Consort	Death	Spouse
	Anna of Austria	Charles II, Archduke of Austria (Habsburg)	16 August 1573	31 May 1592 in Wawel Cathedral			10 February 1598		Sigismund III
	Constance of Austria	Charles II, Archduke of Austria (Habsburg)	24 December 1588	11 December 1605 in Wawel Cathedral			10 July 1631		Sigismund III
	Cecilia Renata of Austria	Ferdinand II, Holy Roman Emperor (Habsburg)	16 July 1611	13 September 1637 in St. John's Cathedral			24 March 1644		Władysław IV
	Marie Louise Gonzaga	Charles I of Gonzaga, Duke of Mantua (Gonzaga)	18 August 1611	5 November 1645	15 July 1646 in Wawel Cathedral		20 May 1648 husband's death	(see below)	Władysław IV
	Marie Louise Gonzaga	Charles I of Gonzaga, Duke of Mantua (Gonzaga)	18 August 1611	30 May 1649	Crowned prior to 2nd marriage		10 May 1667		John II
	Eleonora Maria Josefa of Austria	Ferdinand III, Holy Roman Emperor (Habsburg)	31 May 1653	27 February 1670	29 September 1670 in St. John's Cathedral		10 November 1673 husband's death	17 December 1697	Michael
	Marie Casimire Louise de la Grange d'Arquien	Henri Albert de La Grange d'Arquien (La Grange)	28 June 1641	5 July 1665	2 February 1676 in St. John's Cathedral		17 June 1696 husband's death	1 January 1716	John III
	Christiane Eberhardine of Brandenburg-Bayreuth	Christian Ernst, Margrave of Brandenburg-Bayreuth (Hohenzollern)	19 December 1671	20 January 1693	15 September 1697 husband's coronation	Never crowned	1 September 1706 husband's abdication	4 September 1727	Augustus II, 1st reign
	Catherine Opalińska	Jan Karol Opaliński (Opaliński)	13 October 1680	10 May 1698	4 October 1705 in St. John's Cathedral		1709 husband's desposation	19 March 1747	Stanisław I, 1st reign
	Christiane Eberhardine of Brandenburg-Bayreuth	Christian Ernst, Margrave of Brandenburg-Bayreuth (Hohenzollern)	19 December 1671	20 January 1693	1709 husband's restoration	Never crowned	4 September 1727		Augustus II, 2nd reign
	Catherine Opalińska	Jan Karol Opaliński (Opaliński)	13 October 1680	10 May 1698	1733 husband's restoration	Previously crowned	1736 husband's abdication	19 March 1747	Stanisław I, 2nd reign
	Maria Josepha of Austria	Joseph I, Holy Roman Emperor (Habsburg)	8 December 1699	20 August 1719	17 January 1734 in Wawel Cathedral		17 November 1757		Augustus III
	Elżbieta Szydłowska	Teodor Szydłowski	1748	1785 (allegedly)	Did not (morganatic marriage) (Note: If marriage indeed took place.)	never crowned	25 November 1795 husband's abdication	1 June 1810	Stanisław II August Poniatowski (disputed)

== See also ==
- Coronations in Poland
- Dukes of Greater Poland
- Dukes of Masovia
- Dukes of Pomerania
- Dukes of Sieradz-Łęczyca
- Dukes of Silesia
- List of Galician rulers
- List of royal consorts of Partitioned Poland

== Bibliography ==
- (in Polish) Besala, Jerzy (2006). Małżeństwa królewskie. Piastowie, Przemyślidzi, Andegawenowie. Bellona Muza. ISBN 83-11-10553-7
- (in Polish) Besala, Jerzy (2006). Małżeństwa królewskie. Jagiellonowie. Bellona Muza. ISBN 83-7495-099-4.
- (in Polish) Borkowska, Urszula (2012). Dynastia Jagiellonów w Polsce. PWN. ISBN 978-83-01-16692-2.
