= Hedwig of Sagan =

Queen of Poland from 1365 to 1370

Queen consort of Poland
- Tenure: 1365–1370
- Coronation: 25 February 1365 (likely)
- Born: before 1350
- Died: 27 March 1390 (aged 39–40); Silesia
- Burial: Silesia
- Spouse: Casimir III of Poland; Rupert I of Legnica
- Issue: Anna, Countess of Celje; Kunigunde of Poland; Jadwiga of Poland; Barbara, Duchess of Saxe-Wittenberg; Agnes of Legnica
- House: Piast
- Father: Henry V the Iron
- Mother: Anna of Mazovia

Hedwig of Sagan (Polish: Jadwiga żagańska; before 1350 – 27 March 1390) was Queen of Poland as the fourth wife of Casimir III. Casimir's lack of male heir spelled the end of the Piast dynasty in the Kingdom of Poland. After Casimir's death in 1370, she remarried Rupert I of Legnica.

== Family ==
Hedwig was the third of five children born to Henry V the Iron and his wife Anna, daughter of Duke Wenceslaus of Płock. Her brothers were Henry VI the Elder, Henry VII Rumpold, Henry VIII the Sparrow, and her only sister was Anna, wife of Jan I of Racibórz.

== First marriage ==
Casimir III of Poland had two daughters, Elizabeth and Cunigunde, by his first wife, Aldona of Lithuania. Casimir's second marriage to Adelaide of Hesse was loveless and childless; they spent most their marriage apart from each other. His third wife Christina Rokiczana, his mistress and a widow of a wealthy merchant, also bore no children. Casimir needed a son and he chose Hedwig as it would to strengthen his ties with Charles IV, Holy Roman Emperor.

Hedwig married Casimir III of Poland around 1365. However, Casimir was committing bigamy as was still legally married to his second wife (it is unknown whether Christina was still alive at the time). Casimir forged a papal dispensation because he had a fourth-degree relation to Hedwig. In 1368 Pope Urban V allowed Casimir to stay with Hedwig since his marriage to Christina was invalid. Adelaide died in 1371.

Casimir awaited the birth of a son. If no son was born then Casimir's nephew, Louis I of Hungary, would inherit the throne. Instead of a son, Hedwig bore three daughters:

1. Anna (1366 – 9 June 1425). Married firstly William of Celje. Their only daughter was Anne of Cilli. Married secondly Ulrich, Duke of Teck. They had no children.
2. Cunigunde (1367–1370).
3. Hedwig (1368 – c. 1407), reportedly married c. 1382 but the details are obscure.

The question of the legitimacy of the three daughters was raised. Casimir had all three of his daughters legitimised. Casimir managed to have Anne and Cunigunde legitimised by Pope Urban V on 5 December 1369. Hedwig the younger was legitimised by Pope Gregory XI on 11 October 1371.

On 5 November 1370 Casimir died, leaving Hedwig a widow with three young daughters. Soon afterwards, the middle daughter, Cunigunde, died aged three. From Casimir's will, Hedwig received from the king's treasury 53 fine silver and 1 / 3 silver vessels in the amount of dowry and 1,000 fineslarge cents. Since Casimir did not have a male heir, his throne passed to his nephew, Louis I of Hungary, though Casimir's sister, Elisabeth of Poland, acted as regent for a period of time when Louis was in Hungary.

== Second marriage ==
Hedwig did not remarry straight away. She returned to her home in Żagań where she lived at the court of her brother, Henry VI the Elder.

On 10 February 1372, Hedwig married for a second time to Rupert I of Legnica, son of Wenceslaus I of Legnica and Anna of Cieszyn. The marriage produced two more daughters:

1. Barbara (c. 1384 – Trebitz, 9 May 1436), married Rudolph III, Duke of Saxe-Wittenberg and Elector of Saxony on 6 March 1396. Through this union, Jadwiga was a direct ancestor of the Kings of Denmark and the House of Gonzaga, rulers of Mantua and Montferrato.
2. Agnes (before 1385 – after 7 July 1411), a nun in Wrocław.

After eighteen years of marriage to Rupert, Hedwig died. She was buried in Silesia.

Hedwig of Sagan House of Piast Born: before 1350 Died: 27 March 1390
Royal titles
Preceded by Adelaide of Hesse	Queen consort of Poland; 1365–1370	Succeeded by Elizabeth of Bosnia
