= Hedwig Jagiellon (1408–1431) =

Polish and Lithuanian princess (1408–1431)

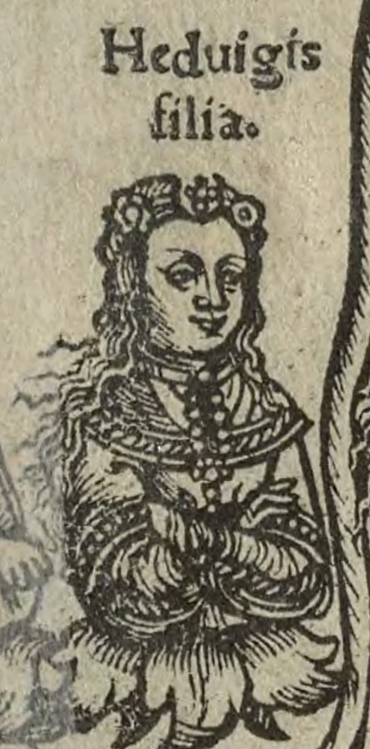
- Hedwig depicted posthumously in 1521
- Born: 8 April 1408; Kraków, Kingdom of Poland
- Died: 8 December 1431 (aged 23); Kraków, Kingdom of Poland
- Burial: Wawel Cathedral, Wawel Hill, Kraków
- Dynasty: Jagiellon
- Father: Władysław II Jagiełło
- Mother: Anna of Cilli

Hedwig Jagiellon (Polish: Jadwiga Jagiellonka; Lithuanian: Jadvyga Jogailaitė; 8 April 1408 – 8 December 1431) was a Polish and Lithuanian princess, and a member of the Jagiellon dynasty. For most of her life she, as the only child of Władysław II Jagiełło (Jogaila, Jagiello), was considered to be heiress of the Polish and Lithuanian thrones. After the birth of Jagiello's sons in 1424 and 1427, Hedwig had some support for her claims to the throne. She died in 1431 amidst rumors that she was poisoned by her stepmother Sophia of Halshany.

== Family relations ==
She was the only daughter of King of Poland and Supreme Duke of Lithuania Władysław Jagiełło by his second wife, Anna of Cilli, daughter of William, Count of Cilli (Celje), and Anna of Poland. Anna of Celje was a granddaughter of King Casimir III of Poland and therefore a Piast heiress. Thanks to his marriage to her in 1402, Jagiello re-legitimized his rule as King of Poland after the death of his first wife, Hedwig (Jadwiga), who reigned as King (not Queen consort) of Poland. Jagiello's and Anna's only daughter, born in 1408, was named after Queen Hedwig.

After it became apparent that Queen Anna would not be able to bear any further children, Hedwig was officially proclaimed heir presumptive to the throne during a congress in Jedlnia in early 1413. Queen Anna died in 1416, leaving Hedwig as Jagiello's sole surviving child. In 1417, Jagiello married Elisabeth of Pilica, and in 1422, Sophia of Halshany. Hedwig was raised by both stepmothers.

== Proposed marriages ==
Until the birth of Jagiello's son Władysław III in 1424, Hedwig's marriage was of paramount importance in Polish politics as her husband would presumably become King of Poland after Jagiello's death. The first known negotiations for her marriage occurred in 1419 between Jagiello and Eric, King of Sweden, Norway, and Dermark. The rulers met in Czerwińsk nad Wisłą to discuss an alliance against the Teutonic Knights. Eric proposed to marry Hedwig to his cousin and presumptive heir Bogislaw IX, Duke of Pomerania, who at the time was eight or nine years old. However, the Polish–Scandinavian–Pomeranian alliance did not materialize.

On 12 April 1421, Hedwig was betrothed to the 7-year-old Prince Frederick, second son of Frederick I, Elector of Brandenburg, who sought Polish alliance in the long-standing Brandenburg–Pomeranian conflict. According to the terms of the agreement, the marriage would take place when Prince Frederick reached age 14 in 1427. Five years after the marriage, Prince Frederick would be eligible to become King of Poland and Grand Duke of Lithuania. The young Brandenburg prince had to live in Poland as soon as was possible, in order to get acquainted with the language and customs of his future country. The agreement would be void if Jagiello had surviving sons.

Ten months later, Jagiello married Sophia of Halshany, who was just a few years older than Hedwig. Frederick I was not satisfied with the marriage and sent his son to Kraków to be with his fiancé. Tensions continued to rise as Brandenburg did not provide troops in the Gollub War against the Teutonic Knights. Sigismund, Holy Roman Emperor, lobbied against the marriage while Scandinavian King Eric renewed his proposal for the Polish–Scandinavian–Pomeranian alliance against Brandenburg. Despite political pressure, Jagiello did not annul the agreement. Fearing an assassination attempt, Grand Duke Vytautas took Frederick II from Kraków to Lithuania in 1424.

In October 1424, Sophia gave birth to Jagiello's son, but Frederick continued to pursue the marriage. A party of Polish nobles wanted Hedwig and her future husband to succeed her father, instead of her father's sons by Sophia of Halshany, who were not descended from the Piast dynasty of Poland. The death of her maternal grandmother, Anna of Poland, in 1425 left Hedwig without any close relatives in the power struggle with Sophia. Due to uncertainties of inheritance, Hedwig's marriage was postponed. For about a year, Hedwig battled an unknown illness. She died in December 1431 and was buried in the Wawel Cathedral. Queen Sophia had to defend herself against rumors that she poisoned the princess. There is evidence to suggest that Frederick II was genuinely in love with Hedwig and suffered bouts of depression as a result of her death.

== Bibliography ==
- Łowmiański, Henryk, Polityka Jagiellonów, Poznań 2006. ISBN 83-7177-401-X
- Tęgowski, Jan, Pierwsze pokolenia Giedyminowiczów, Poznań - Wrocław 1999. ISBN 83-913563-1-0
- Wdowiszewski, Zygmunt, Genealogia Jagiellonów i Domu Wazów w Polsce, Kraków 2005. ISBN 83-918497-2-4
