= Ludwig the Younger of Hesse =

- Born: 1305
- Died: 2 February 1345
- Noble family: House of Hesse
- Spouse: Elisabeth of Sponheim-Kreuznach
- Issue: Otto; Hermann II, Landgrave of Hesse; Agnes
- Father: Otto I, Landgrave of Hesse
- Mother: Adelheid of Ravensberg

Ludwig the Younger of Hesse (German: Ludwig der Junker) (1305 – 2 February 1345) was a German nobleman. He was the third son of Landgrave Otto I of Hesse and his wife Adelheid, a daughter of Otto III of Ravensberg.

== Life ==
In 1326, Otto I and Adelheid visited Pope John XXII in Avignon with a large retinue. The Pope promised Louis a prebendary if he remained celibate. He refused and renounced his ecclesiastical career.

In 1328, Otto I died and his elder brother Henry II inherited the Landgraviate. Louis received an apanage, consisting of castle and district of Grebenstein.

Louis died in 1345. Henry II adopted his son, Herman II in 1367, after his own son Otto had died in the spring, to be his co-ruler and heir.

== Marriage and issue ==
On 15 October 1340, Louis married Elisabeth (or Elise), a daughter of Count Simon II of Sponheim-Kreuznach. She was the widow of the Swabian Count Rudolph I of Hohenberg, dead since 1336. They had three children:

- Otto (1341-1357) was destined for an ecclesiastical career and educated in Magdeburg, where he became a canon and intended to succeed his uncle Otto as Archbishop had he lived longer. He may have been poisoned by abbot Henry VII of Fulda Abbey.
- Herman II, nicknamed "the Learned" (c. 1342 – 1413), succeeded his uncle Henry II, Landgrave of Hesse as Landgrave of Hesse
- Agnes (c. 1344 – 25 December 1394), was abbess of the Cistercian monastery St. Catherine in Eisenach, where she died
