= Adelaide of Hesse =

Queen of Poland from 1341 to 1356

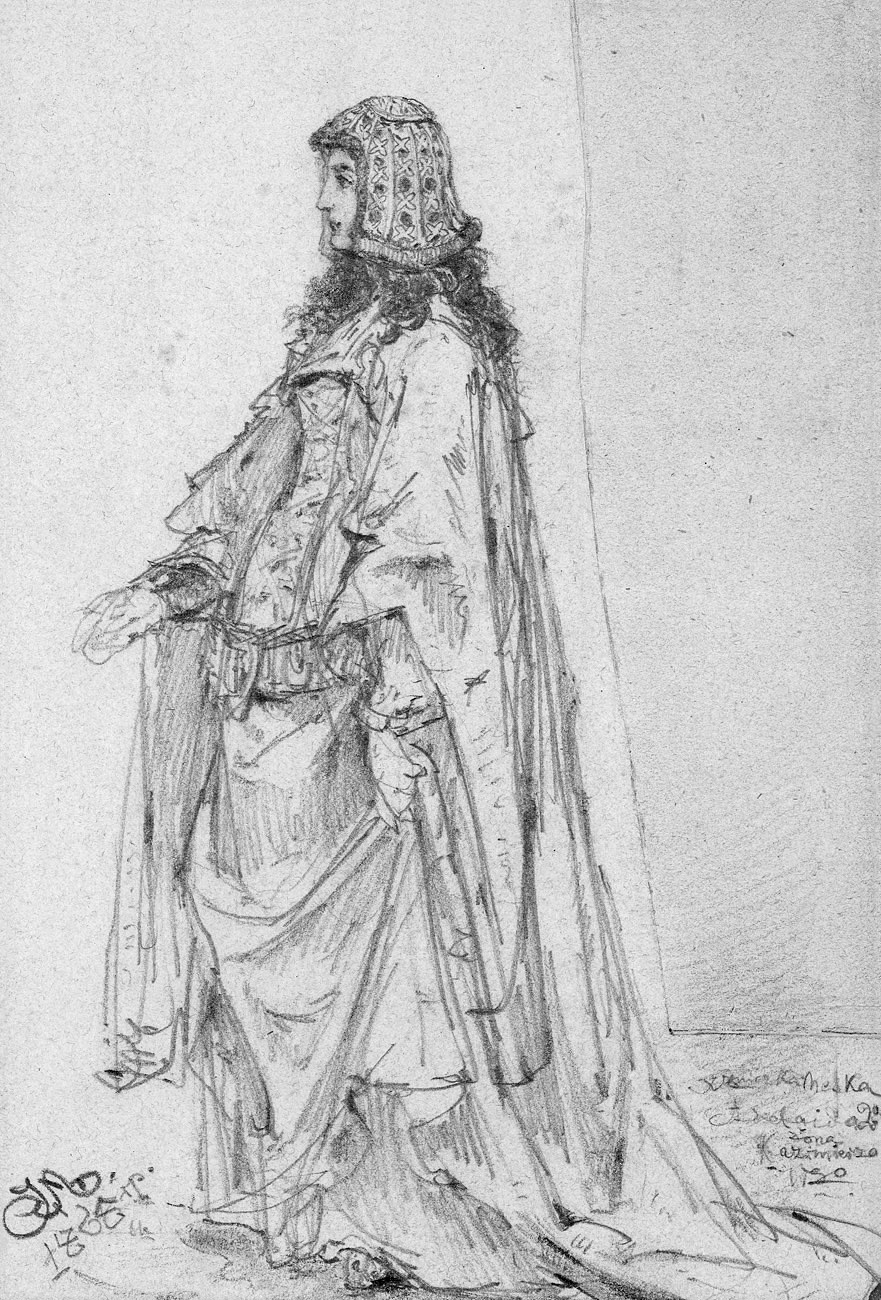
- An 1865 imagining of Adelaide by Polish painter Jan Matejko

Queen consort of Poland
- Tenure: 1341–1356 (de facto); 1341–1370 (de jure)
- Coronation: 29 September 1341
- Born: c. 1324
- Died: c. 1371 (aged 46–47)
- Spouse: Casimir III of Poland
- House: Hesse (by birth); Piast (by marriage)
- Father: Henry II, Landgrave of Hesse
- Mother: Elisabeth of Thuringia

Adelaide of Hesse (Polish: Adelajda Heska, German: Adelheid von Hessen; after 1323 – after 26 May 1371) was a noble of the House of Hesse by birth and the queen consort of Poland by marriage to Casimir III of Poland. She was the eldest daughter of Henry II, Landgrave of Hesse, and his wife Elisabeth of Thuringia (1306–1367), daughter of Frederick I, Margrave of Meissen.

== Biography ==
She was named after her paternal grandmother, Adelheid von Ravensberg.

=== Marriage ===
On 29 September 1341, Adelaide married Casimir the Great and was crowned queen consort of Poland at Poznań Cathedral in Poznań. The marriage was a result of an agreement between Casimir III and Luxemburgs.

It was Casimir's second marriage and occurred two years after the death of his first wife, Aldona of Lithuania. His union with Aldona had produced two daughters, Elizabeth (1326–1361) and Kunigunde (also Cunigunde; 1334–1357), but no male heirs.

Adelaide was seventeen or eighteen years old at the time of the wedding – only a few years older than Casimir's eldest daughter – and Casimir was 31. The marriage was an unhappy one and Casimir started living separately from Adelaide soon after their marriage. Adelaide lived primarily at the castle in Żarnowiec on the Pilica river and is credited with founding the parish church there.

Their loveless marriage lasted until 1356. Casimir separated from Adelaide in 1356 and entered a morganatic marriage with his mistress, Krystyna Rokiczana (also Christina), the widow of Mikulasz Rokiczani (also Miklusz, Mikuláš), a wealthy merchant. Casimir's separation from Adelaide was not recognized by the church and was considered bigamous, which put him at odds with the clergy.

Casimir continued living with Krystyna despite complaints by Pope Innocent VI on behalf of Adelaide. The marriage lasted until 1363 or 1364, at which time Casimir again declared himself divorced. They had no children. The marriage to Adelaide was annulled in 1368. Then Casimir married his fourth wife, Jadwiga (Hedwig) of Żagań. This marriage produced another three daughters.

With Adelaide still alive and Christina possibly as well, the marriage to Jadwiga was also considered bigamous. The legitimacy of the three last daughters was disputed. Casimir managed to have two of his daughters, Anna and Kunigunde, legitimatised by Pope Urban V on December 5, 1369. Jadwiga the younger, was legitimatised by Pope Gregory XI on October 1, 1371.

== Later life ==
After the annulment of her marriage, Adelaide went back home to Hesse. She spent the rest of her life in Hesse.

After her ex-husband's death, she fought for her property rights. She intervened in this case to Pope Gregory XI. On May 26, 1371, the Pope urged King Louis to give back her property.

== In popular culture ==
=== Film ===
Queen Adelaide is one of the main characters in the second season of Polish historical TV drama series The Crown of the Kings (Polish: Korona królów). She is played by Aleksandra Przesław.

Adelaide of Hesse House of Hesse Born: 1324
Royal titles
Vacant Last known title holder: Aldona of Lithuania	Queen consort of Poland; 1341–1356	Succeeded by Hedwig of Sagan
