= Anna of Poland, Countess of Celje =

Polish princess (1366–1425)

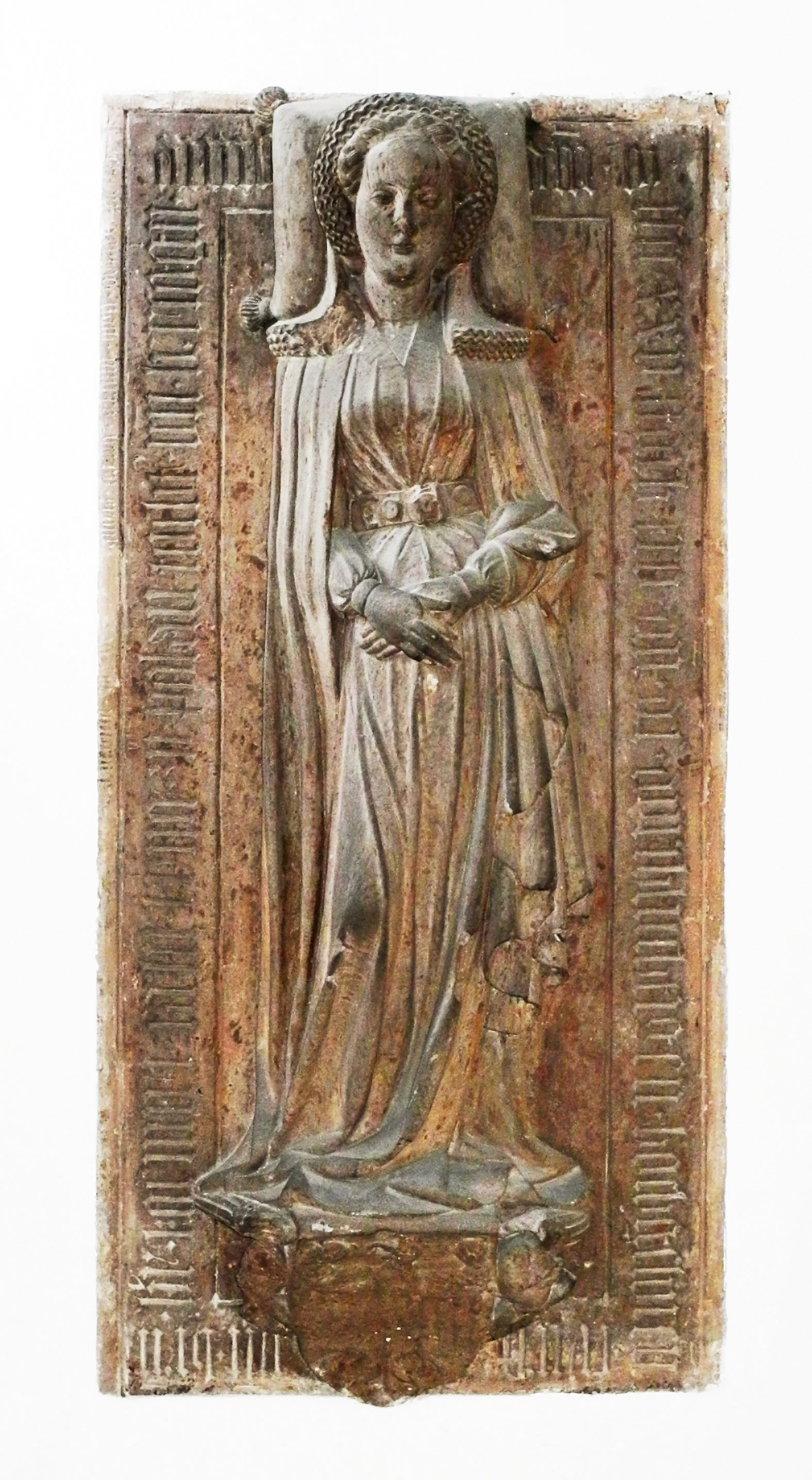
Tombstone with a representation of Anna, Mindelheim, Germany.

Princess Anna of Poland (1366–1425) was a Polish princess born into the House of Piast, and by marriage was Countess of Celje, also called Cilli, a medieval feudal dynasty within the Holy Roman Empire. She was an influential woman in the politics of the Kingdom of Poland.

== Biography ==
She was the daughter of King Casimir III of Poland (1309–1370), who was succeeded, not by Anna nor any of Casimir's own descendants, but by Casimir's nephew, King Louis I of Hungary. Anna's mother was Casimir's fourth wife Hedwig of Sagan (d. 1390). Her elder half-sisters were already dead though one of them had left children. Anna was the eldest child of that fourth marriage, which also did not produce any sons, to King Casimir's dismay.

In 1380, Anna was married to William, Count of Celje (1361–1392), a man chosen by her first cousin, King Louis I, from among his allies on the Hungarian southern borderlands. They had a single surviving child, a daughter named Anna (1386–1416). In 1394, the widowed Anna married Ulrich, Duke of Teck (died 1432).

Meanwhile, the throne of Poland had passed in 1386 to Jogaila, Grand Duke of Lithuania. When his first wife, Queen Hedwig (Anna's first cousin once removed), died in 1399 without surviving children, Jogaila sought a wife among the heirs to the kingdom of Poland, which had been Hedwig's inheritance. Duchess Anna desired to regain Poland for her heirs, the descendants of Casimir III, and to obtain power in her homeland. To achieve this, her daughter Anna was married in 1401 or 1402 to the widowed king, then aged around 50. She gave birth to a daughter, Hedwig Jagiellon, in 1408.

The Duchess of Teck worked to advance her daughter's and granddaughter's position in Poland. When her daughter died in 1416, leaving no further surviving children (except Hedwig), Jogaila married Elisabeth of Pilica in 1417, and then Sophia of Halshany in 1422, both of whom did not descend from the Piast kings of Poland, as he had been unable to find any more brides with a hereditary right to the kingdom. The king's two sons and heirs were borne by his last wife, Sophia.

In 1421, Anna's granddaughter was betrothed to the future Frederick II, Elector of Brandenburg (1413–1471), the second son of Frederick I, Elector of Brandenburg. A party of Polish nobles, including Anna, wanted Hedwig and her intended husband to succeed Jogaila at least in Poland, instead of her half-brothers, his sons by Sophia.

Anna died in 1425, which left Hedwig without any strong relatives to support her position. Because Hedwig died (allegedly poisoned) in 1431 without any issue, Anna's descent became extinct before Jogaila's death in 1434.

== Family ==
In 1380, Anna of Poland married to William, Count of Celje (1361–1392). They had a single surviving child:

- Anna of Celje (1386–1416), married to Jogaila Grand Duke of Lithuania, named Wladyslaw II as king of Poland.
  - Hedwig Jagiellon, died 23 years old.

In 1394, the widowed Anna of Poland married Ulrich, Duke of Teck (died 1432).
