= Hermann II of Hesse =

Landgrave of Hesse (1342–1413)

Hermann II
- Landgrave of Hesse
- Born: c. 1342
- Died: 10 June 1413 (aged 70–71)
- Noble family: Hesse
- Spouses: Johanna of Nassau-Weilburg; Margaret of Hohenzollern-Nuremberg
- Issue: Anna; Heinrich; Elisabeth; Margarete; Agnes; Hermann; Frederick; Louis
- Father: Louis the Junker
- Mother: Elizabeth of Sponheim

Hermann II (c. 1342 – 10 June 1413), nicknamed the Scholar (German: der Gelehrte), was Landgrave of Hesse from 1376 to 1413.

== Life ==
Hermann II was born around 1342 to Louis the Junker and Elizabeth of Sponheim, daughter of Simon II, Count of Sponheim-Kreuznach. Louis the Junker was a son of Otto I, Landgrave of Hesse. Hermann studied in Paris and in Prague. After the death of Otto the Younger, the son and heir apparent of Henry II, the latter appointed his nephew Hermann as co-ruler and heir in 1367.

Hermann was married twice. The first marriage on 3 February 1377 was to Johanna, countess of Nassau-Weilburg [c. 1362-1383] but produced no children. The second was on 15 October 1383 to Margaret of Hohenzollern-Nuremberg [c. 1360-1406], daughter of Frederick V, Burgrave of Nuremberg. They had the following children:

- Anna (1385–1386)
- Henry (1387–1394)
- Elisabeth (1388–1394).
- Margarete (1389–1446), married to Henry I of Brunswick-Lüneburg
- Agnes (1391–1471), married to Otto II of Brunswick-Göttingen
- Hermann (1396–1406)
- Frederick (1398–1402)
- Louis (1402–1458), succeeded as Landgrave of Hesse

Hermann II of Hesse House of Hesse Born: c. 1342 Died: 10 June 1413
Regnal titles
Preceded by Henry II	Landgrave of Hesse; 1376–1413	Succeeded by Louis I
