= Coronation of the Polish monarch =

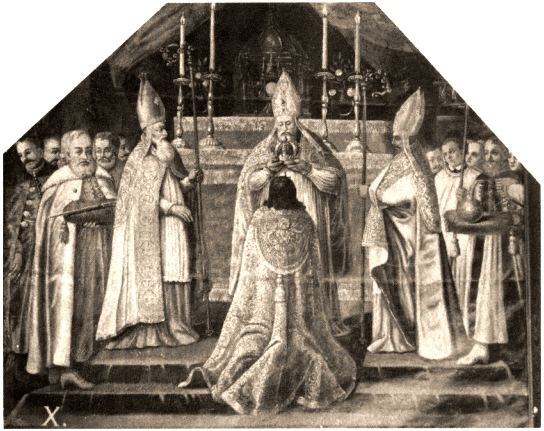
Coronation of John II Casimir Vasa

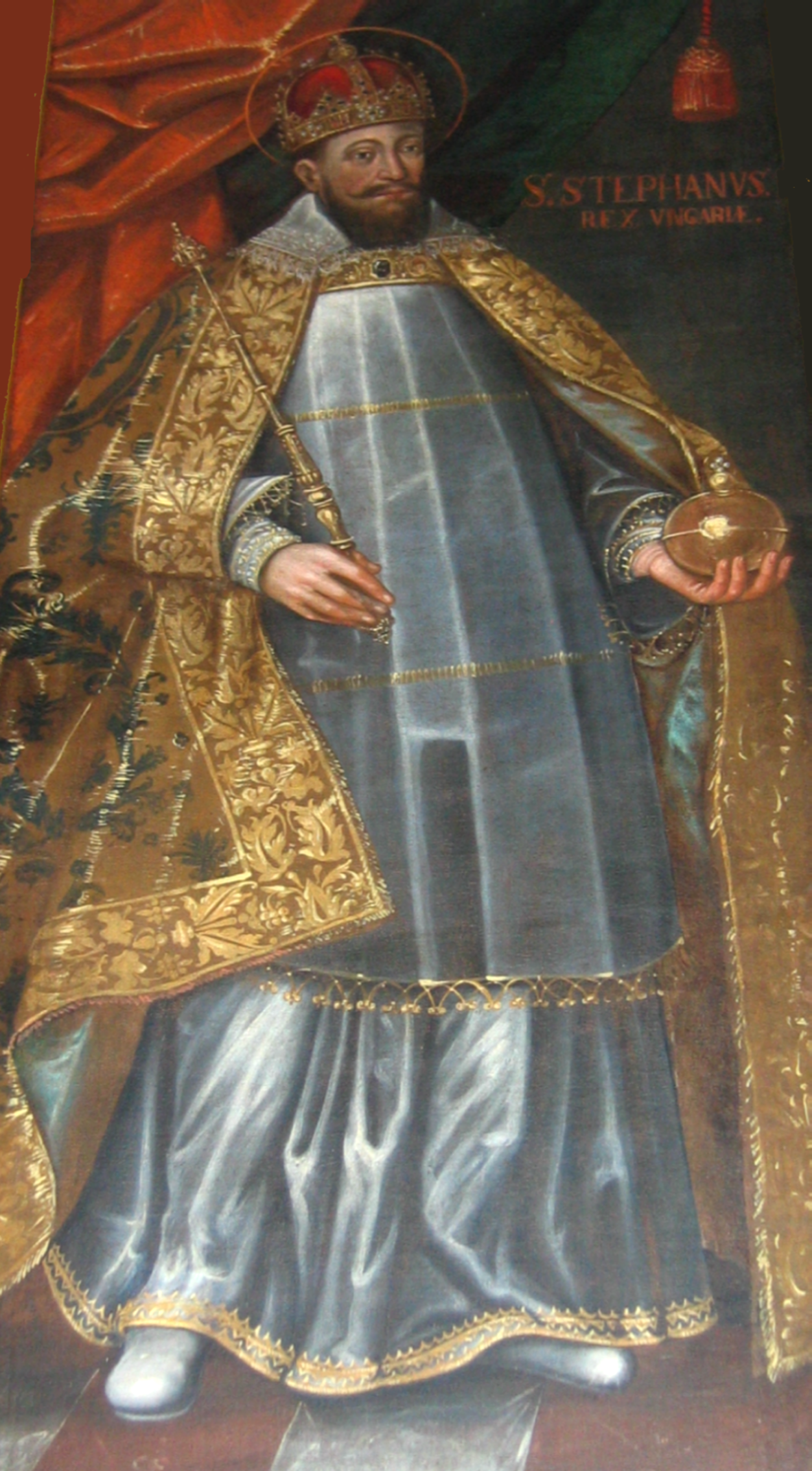
Sigismund III of Poland as rex sacerdos in coronation robe, (depicted as Saint Stephen I of Hungary)

Coronations in Poland officially began in 1025 and continued until 1764, when the final king of an independent Poland, Stanisław August Poniatowski, was crowned at St. John's Cathedral in Warsaw. Most Polish coronations took place at the Wawel Cathedral in Kraków, but crownings also occurred in Poznań and at Gniezno Cathedral. Whenever practical, Polish coronations were conducted as close as possible as to the date of the previous sovereign's funeral. This was explained by Joachim Bielski in the sixteenth century as osoba umiera, korona nie umiera, or "the person dies, the crown dies not". With the emergence of an independent, republican Poland after World War I, coronations in the Polish state have been rendered obsolete.

Though many of the Polish Crown Jewels were stolen and destroyed by King Frederick William III of Prussia in March 1809 after the Third Partition of Poland, remaining pieces are exhibited at the Wawel Royal Castle National Art Collection and National Museum in Warsaw.

== The ceremony ==
During the period when coronations were held in Kraków, the following order was observed: on the eve of his coronation, the new monarch fasted, gave alms, and partook of the Catholic sacrament of confession. He then walked on foot from the royal Wawel Castle to the Basilica of St. Stanisław, patron saint of Poland. Unlike the remainder of the service, the royal procession was opened to the Polish masses. On the morning of the ceremony, the king was met in his bedchamber by a procession consisting of the local Metropolitan Archbishop and other notables. Wearing Episcopal clothing, the monarch was blessed with holy water and incensed. Following this, king, metropolitan and the others made their way in procession to the cathedral.

Inside the church, the Polish regalia were laid on the high altar, while the king was seated on a low chair nearby. The royal oath was administered, and the new monarch then knelt before the altar. Two mitred abbots next entered from a side chapel, carrying a mixture of holy oils, with which the ruler was then anointed. Following this, the king was handed a sword, which he used to trace a cross in the air. Next he was crowned by the Archbishop, assisted by two other bishops, following which he received his orb and scepter. The high Mass continued, with the newly crowned sovereign receiving Holy Communion, then kissing a crucifix and mounting his throne. Following this, the king created several new knights, then attended a coronation feast and rode into the public square on horseback, where he received the homage of his subjects while seated in a large chair.

== List of Polish coronations ==
*	King or queen Polish name	Date	Site	Presiding cleric	Crown used
K	Bolesław I the Brave; Bolesław I Chrobry	Early 1025	Gniezno Cathedral	Hipolit, Archbishop of Gniezno	Original Crown of Bolesław I the Brave
Q	Oda of Meissen	Early 1025 (presumed)	Gniezno Cathedral	Hipolit, Archbishop of Gniezno (presumed)	Unknown
K	Mieszko II Lambert	25 December 1025	Gniezno Cathedral	Hipolit, Archbishop of Gniezno	Original Crown of Bolesław I the Brave
Q	Richeza of Lotharingia; Rycheza Lotaryńska	25 December 1025	Gniezno Cathedral	Hipolit, Archbishop of Gniezno	Richeza's Crown
K	Boleslaus II the Bold; Bolesław II Śmiały	25 December 1076	Gniezno Cathedral	Bogumił, Archbishop of Gniezno	Boleslaus the Bold's Crown
K	Premislaus; Przemysł	26 June 1295	Gniezno Cathedral	Jakub Świnka, Archbishop of Gniezno	Boleslaus the Bold's Crown
Q	Margaret of Brandenburg; Małgorzata Brandenburska	26 June 1295	Gniezno Cathedral	Jakub Świnka, Archbishop of Gniezno	Margaret of Brandenburg's Crown
K	Wenceslaus; Wacław Czeski	August 1300	Gniezno Cathedral	Jakub Świnka, Archbishop of Gniezno	Boleslaus the Bold's Crown
Q	Elisabeth Richeza of Poland; Ryksa Elżbieta	26 May 1303	Prague Cathedral	Henryk of Wierzbno, Bishop of Wrocław	Margaret of Brandenburg's Crown
K	Władysław I Łokietek	20 January 1320	Kraków Cathedral	Janisław, Archbishop of Gniezno	So-called Crown of Bolesław I the Brave
Q	Hedwig of Kalisz; Jadwiga Kaliska	20 January 1320	Kraków Cathedral	Janisław, Archbishop of Gniezno	Hedwig of Kalisz's Crown
K	Casimir III the Great; Kazimierz III Wielki	25 April 1333	Kraków Cathedral	Janisław, Archbishop of Gniezno	So-called Crown of Bolesław I the Brave
Q	Aldona of Lithuania	25 April 1333	Kraków Cathedral	Janisław, Archbishop of Gniezno	Hedwig of Kalisz's Crown
Q	Adelaide of Hesse; Adelajda Heska	29 September 1341	Poznań Cathedral	Janisław, Archbishop of Gniezno	Hedwig of Kalisz's Crown
Q	Hedwig of Sagan Jadwiga Żagańska	25 February 1365 (presumed)	Wschowa	Jan Doliwa, bishop of Poznań (presumed)	Unknown
K	Louis the Great; Ludwik Węgierski	10 November 1370	Kraków Cathedral	Jarosław of Bogoria, Archbishop of Gniezno	So-called Crown of Bolesław I the Brave
K	Jadwiga; Jadwiga Andegaweńska	15 October 1384	Kraków Cathedral	Bodzanta, Archbishop of Gniezno	Unknown (possibly Hedwig of Kalisz's Crown)
K	Ladislaus II; Władysław II Jagiełło	4 March 1386	Kraków Cathedral	Bodzanta, Archbishop of Gniezno	Ladislaus II's Crown
Q	Anna of Celje; Anna Cylejska	25 February 1403	Kraków Cathedral	Mikołaj Kurowski, Archbishop of Gniezno	Anna of Celje's Crown
Q	Elizabeth Granowska; Elżbieta Granowska	19 November 1417	Kraków Cathedral	Jan Rzeszowski, Archbishop of Lviv	Hedwig of Kalisz's Crown
Q	Sophia of Halshany; Zofia Holszańska	12 February 1424	Kraków Cathedral	Wojciech Jastrzębiec, Archbishop of Gniezno	Hedwig of Kalisz's Crown
K	Władysław III; Władysław III	25 July 1434	Kraków Cathedral	Wojciech Jastrzębiec, Archbishop of Gniezno	So-called Crown of Bolesław I the Brave
K	Casimir IV; Kazimierz IV	25 June 1447	Kraków Cathedral	Wincenty Kot, Archbishop of Gniezno	So-called Crown of Bolesław I the Brave
Q	Elizabeth of Austria; Elżbieta Rakuszanka	10 February 1454	Kraków Cathedral	Jan Sprowski, Archbishop of Gniezno	Hedwig of Kalisz's Crown
K	John I Albert; Jan I Olbracht	23 September 1492	Kraków Cathedral	Zbigniew Oleśnicki, Archbishop of Gniezno	So-called Crown of Bolesław I the Brave
K	Alexander; Aleksander	12 December 1501	Kraków Cathedral	Fryderyk Jagiellończyk, Archbishop of Gniezno	So-called Crown of Bolesław I the Brave
K	Sigismund I Zygmunt I	24 January 1507	Kraków Cathedral	Andrzej Boryszewski, Archbishop of Gniezno	So-called Crown of Bolesław I the Brave
Q	Barbara Zápolya	8 February 1512	Kraków Cathedral	Jan Łaski, Archbishop of Gniezno	Hedwig of Kalisz's Crown
Q	Bona Sforza	18 April 1518	Kraków Cathedral	Jan Łaski, Archbishop of Gniezno	Hedwig of Kalisz's Crown
K	Sigismund II Augustus; Zygmunt II August	20 February 1530	Kraków Cathedral	Jan Łaski, Archbishop of Gniezno	So-called Crown of Bolesław I the Brave
Q	Elizabeth of Austria; Elżbieta Habsubrżanka	8 May 1543	Kraków Cathedral	Piotr Gamrat, Archbishop of Gniezno	Hedwig of Kalisz's Crown
Q	Barbara Radziwiłłówna	7 December 1550	Kraków Cathedral	Mikołaj Dzierzgowski, Archbishop of Gniezno	Hedwig of Kalisz's Crown
Q	Catherine of Austria; Katarzyna Habsburżanka	30 June 1553	Kraków Cathedral	Mikołaj Dzierzgowski, Archbishop of Gniezno	Hedwig of Kalisz's Crown
K	Henry; Henryk Walezy	21 February 1574	Kraków Cathedral	Jakub Uchański, Archbishop of Gniezno	So-called Crown of Bolesław I the Brave
K	Anna; Anna Jagiellonka	1 May 1576	Kraków Cathedral	Stanisław Karnkowski, Bishop of Kuyavia	Anna Jagiellonka's Crown
K	Stephen; Stefan Batory	1 May 1576	Kraków Cathedral	Stanisław Karnkowski, Bishop of Kuyavia	So-called Hungarian Crown
K	Sigismund III; Zygmunt III Waza	27 December 1587	Kraków Cathedral	Stanisław Karnkowski, Archbishop of Gniezno	So-called Crown of Bolesław I the Brave
Q	Anna of Austria; Anna Austriaczka	31 May 1592	Kraków Cathedral	Stanisław Karnkowski, Archbishop of Gniezno	Hedwig of Kalisz's Crown
Q	Constance of Austria; Konstancja Austriaczka	11 December 1605	Kraków Cathedral	Piotr Tylicki, Bishop of Kuyavia	Hedwig of Kalisz's Crown
K	Władysław IV; Władysław IV	6 February 1633	Kraków Cathedral	Jan Wężyk, Archbishop of Gniezno	So-called Crown of Bolesław I the Brave
Q	Cecilia Renata; Cecylia Renata	13 September 1637	St. John's Church in Warsaw	Jan Wężyk, Archbishop of Gniezno	Hedwig of Kalisz's Crown
Q	Marie Louise Gonzaga; Ludwika Maria Gonzaga	15 July 1646	Kraków Cathedral	Maciej Łubieński, Archbishop of Gniezno	Hedwig of Kalisz's Crown
K	John II Casimir; Jan II Kazimierz	17 January 1649	Kraków Cathedral	Maciej Łubieński, Archbishop of Gniezno	So-called Crown of Bolesław I the Brave
K	Michael; Michał Korybut Wiśniowiecki	29 September 1669	Kraków Cathedral	Mikołaj Prażmowski, Archbishop of Gniezno	So-called Crown of Bolesław I the Brave
Q	Eleonora Maria Josefa; Eleonora Habsburżanka	29 September 1670	St. John's Church in Warsaw	Mikołaj Prażmowski, Archbishop of Gniezno	Hedwig of Kalisz's Crown
K	John III; Jan III Sobieski	2 February 1676	Kraków Cathedral	Andrzej Olszowski, Archbishop of Gniezno	So-called Crown of Bolesław I the Brave
Q	Marie Casimire d'Arquien; Maria Kazimiera	2 February 1676	Kraków Cathedral	Andrzej Olszowski, Archbishop of Gniezno	Hedwig of Kalisz's Crown
K	Augustus II the Strong; August II Mocny	15 September 1697	Kraków Cathedral	Stanisław Dąbski, Bishop of Kuyavia	So-called Crown of Bolesław I the Brave
K	Stanislaus I Stanisław Leszczyński	4 October 1705	St. John's Church in Warsaw	Konstanty Zieliński, Archbishop of Lviv	Stanislaus I's Crown
Q	Katarzyna Opalińska	4 October 1705	St. John's Church in Warsaw	Konstanty Zieliński, Archbishop of Lviv	Katarzyna Opalińska's Crown
K	Augustus III; August III Sas	17 January 1734	Kraków Cathedral	Jan Aleksander Lipski, Bishop of Kraków	Augustus III's Crown
Q	Maria Josepha of Austria; Maria Józefa Austriaczka	17 January 1734	Kraków Cathedral	Jan Aleksander Lipski, Bishop of Kraków	Maria Josepha's Crown
K	Stanislaus II Augustus; Stanisław August Poniatowski	25 November 1764	St. John's Church in Warsaw	Władysław Łubieński, Archbishop of Gniezno	So-called Crown of Bolesław I the Brave
K	Nicholas I Mikołaj I Romanow	24 May 1829	Royal Castle in Warsaw	The king crowned himself, assisted by Jan Paweł Woronicz, Archbishop of Warsaw	Empress Anna Ivanovna's Crown

* "K" indicates a king or queen regnant; "Q" indicates a queen consort.

== Pretenders and royal consorts not crowned ==
- Wenceslaus III of Bohemia, assassinated before crowning
- Wiola of Cieszyn, wife of Wenceslaus III of Bohemia, daughter of Mieszko of Cieszyn, Duke of Cieszyn
- Krystyna, daughter of Weneclaus of Praga, third wife of Casimir III of Poland, taken by him as morganatic wife
- Elizabeth of Bosnia, wife of Louis the Great, daughter of Stephen II, Ban of Bosnia
- William of Austria, married in childhood to Jadwiga of Poland, later claimed to consummated marriage during his visit in Poland; marriage was not recognized as valid by Polish nobles and the Pope, and renounced by Jadwiga
- Helena of Moscow, wife of Alexander Jagiellon, daughter of Ivan III, Grand Duke of Moscow, not crowned because of her Orthodox faith
- Christiane Eberhardine of Brandenburg-Bayreuth, wife of August II the Strong, daughter of Christian Ernst, Margrave of Brandenburg-Bayreuth, not crowned because of her Protestant faith
- Elżbieta Szydłowska, possible morganatic wife of Stanisław August Poniatowski

== See also ==
- List of Polish monarchs
- Henrician Articles
- Polish Crown Jewels
- Royal Road, Kraków
- St. Florian's Church
- Vivente Rege
