= Otto the Younger =

Otto II
- Born: before 1322
- Died: December 1366; Spangenberg Castle
- Noble family: House of Hesse
- Father: Henry II, Landgrave of Hesse
- Mother: Elisabeth of Thuringia

Otto II of Hesse, also known as Otto the Younger (before 1322 - December 1366, Spangenberg Castle), was the only son of Landgrave Henry II of Hesse and his wife Elisabeth of Thuringia, daughter of Margrave Frederick of Meissen.

== Life ==
Otto married Elisabeth of Cleves (died 1382) in 1338, daughter of Dietrich VIII, Count of Cleves. The marriage was likely childless. In 1339/40 he was co-regent with his father and imperial governor in Mühlhausen. Otto participated in, among other things, two victorious feuds of his father (1356 and 1361) against the abbot Henry VII of Fulda. In 1356, he devastated the village of Hausen and Hausen Castle. In 1361, Otto and Margrave Frederick III of Meissen conquered and plundered in the city of Hünfeld in Fulda.

Otto resided at Spangenberg Castle in Spangenberg, where he died in 1366. His unexpected and sudden death gave rise to the assumption that he had fallen victim to a poison attack initiated by Abbot Henry VII of Fulda. After Otto's death, Henry II appointed his nephew Hermann (1341–1413) as co-regent and heir in 1367.

== Saga of Otto the Archer ==
According to a legend that has been told since the 16th century, Otto left his homeland because his older brother Henry (who did not actually exist) was the heir and he himself was destined to be a clergyman. He lived unrecognized as an archer at the count's court in Kleve. There he fell in love with Count Dietrich's daughter Elisabeth (Elsbeth). Otto's brother Henry died young, however, and since Otto was thought missing, Hesse was in danger of falling to his brother-in-law Duke Otto of Braunschweig, who was married to a daughter of Henry II. Otto was then recognized by a visiting Hessian knight, who greeted him with great respect. Count Dietrich now agreed to his daughter's marriage to Otto. Otto returned with his bride to his father's court.

The material was often worked poetically and musically, in dramas, operas, a novel, short stories and lyrical-epic poems. The most famous arrangement is that of Gottfried Kinkel, Otto der Schütz. Eine rheinische Geschichte in zwölf Abenteuern (Otto the Archer: A Rhenish Story In Twelve Adventures), from 1846.

In Kleve a large fountain statue was erected for Otto, which first stood at the fish market and later at the end of the prince's court. This statue was destroyed during the bombing of Kleve in 1944. In the old auditorium of the University of Marburg there is a series of wall paintings called "Otto der Schütz" (Otto the Archer). The Kinkel monument in Oberkassel, inaugurated in 1906, shows a scene from Kinkel's epic “Otto der Schütz” on one of its four relief panels.

== Literature ==
- Eckhart G. Franz: Das Haus Hessen. Kohlhammer Urban, Stuttgart, 2005, ISBN 978-3-17-018919-5, S. 24–25.
- Heinz Scholten: Otto der Schütz. In: Rund um den Schwanenturm, Zeitschrift des Klevischen Vereins für Kultur und Geschichte. 24. Jahrgang, Kleve 2005, S. 31–34.
- Margret Lemberg: Otto der Schütz. Literatur, Kunst und Politik. Ein Bilderzyklus in der Alten Aula der Philipps-Universität Marburg. (= Schriften der Universitätsbibliothek, Band 82.) Philipps-Universität Marburg, Marburg, 1997, ISBN 3-8185-0241-2.

== Note ==
This page is translated from the German Wikipedia page Otto der Schütz.
