= Elizabeth Granowska =

Queen of Poland from 1417 to 1420

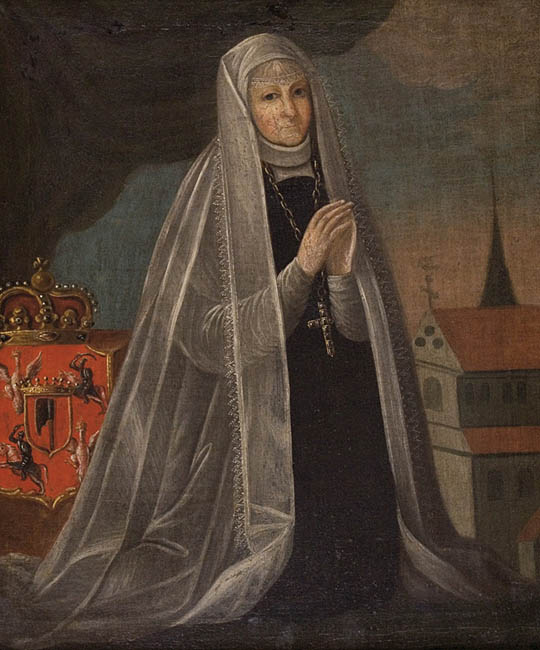
- Anonymous painting from 1779

Queen consort of Poland Grand Duchess consort of Lithuania
- Tenure: 2 May 1417 – 12 May 1420
- Coronation: 19 November 1417
- Born: between 1370–1380
- Died: 12 May 1420 (aged 39–50); Kraków, Poland
- Burial: Wawel Cathedral
- Spouses: Wiszla Czambor (m. 1385/1389; died before 1390); Jenczik of Jičina (m. after 1385; died in or before 1390) Wincenty Granowski (m. 1397; died 1410) Władysław II Jagiełło (m. 1417)
- Issue: 6
- Father: Otton of Pilica
- Mother: Jadwiga of Melsztyn

Elizabeth of Pilica (Polish: Elżbieta z Pilczy), often referred to by her tertio voto name Elizabeth Granowska (Polish: Elżbieta Granowska; 1370/1380 – 12 May 1420) was Queen of Poland and Grand Duchess of Lithuania (1417–1420) as the third wife of Władysław II Jagiełło (Jogaila), Grand Duke of Lithuania (1377–1434) and King of Poland (1386–1434).

== Early life and first marriages ==
Elizabeth was the only child of Otton of Pilica, Voivode of Sandomierz, and Jadwiga of Melsztyn, daughter of Jan of Melsztyn and godmother of King Władysław II Jagiełło. Elizabeth's uncle Spytek of Melsztyn was an influential figure in Jagiełło's court. When her father died in 1384 or 1385, Elizabeth inherited his vast estates, which included Pilica and Łańcut.

According to Jan Długosz, Elizabeth was kidnapped by Wiseł Czambor from Moravia. Possibly Czambor wanted to marry Elizabeth to obtain her riches. She was kidnapped again by Jan (Jeczik) of Jičina from Czambor's house. Czambor then traveled to Kraków where he was murdered by Jan, who later received a permission from Jogaila to marry Elizabeth. Authenticity of that account was doubtful as it is not corroborated by other sources and Długosz did not provide dates. However Elizabeth's mother wrote in 1390 a document in which she mentions Jenczik's death and thanks God for her daughter's safe return, proving that story about kidnappings and forced marriages was indeed true.

Around 1397, Elizabeth married Wincenty Granowski, castellan of Nakło and a widower with at least three sons. The marriage provided a career boost to Granowski. He was sent on diplomatic missions to the Teutonic Knights and Wenceslaus IV of Bohemia. In 1409, he became starosta of Greater Poland and in 1410 commanded his own squad in the Battle of Grunwald. He died suddenly at the end of 1410. It is believed that he was poisoned. Elizabeth probably had two sons and four daughters by Granowski.

== Queen of Poland ==
In March 1416, Queen Anna of Celje died leaving King Jogaila a widower with one surviving daughter. Polish nobility encouraged Jogaila to remarry both for political reasons and to secure a male heir. Grand Duke of Lithuania Vytautas proposed a marriage to his granddaughter Maria Vasilievna, daughter of Vasily I of Moscow. Sigismund, Holy Roman Emperor, proposed his niece Elisabeth, Duchess of Luxembourg. Therefore, it came as a surprise when Jogaila decided to marry Elizabeth Granowska, a middle-aged widow with few political connections and scandalous past. Bishop Stanisław Ciołek called her a "pig", while others dismayed over her age.

In January 1417, Jogaila traveled to Lithuania and stopped in Liuboml to meet with his sister Alexandra, who was accompanied by Elizabeth Granowska. After a few days, Jogaila left Liuboml but not before showering Elizabeth with many expensive gifts. It was not the first time they met as Elizabeth's family frequented Jogaila's court. In March 1417, on his way back to Poland, Jogaila stopped in Łańcut, Elizabeth's domain. It appears that the marriage decision, perhaps engineered by Alexandra, was made there. They married on 2 May 1417 in Sanok, but her coronation was postponed until 19 November due to resistance from the Polish nobility. They argued that the real queen was Princess Hedwig Jagiellon or that Elizabeth was a "spiritual sister" of Jogaila as her mother was his godmother. However, despite nobles trying to use the Princess as their symbol against Elizabeth's coronation, it seems stepmother and stepdaughter maintained good relationship with each other, as they often associated together and shared the same royal household accounts. For wedding to be valid in eyes of Catholic Church, Jogaila obtained a dispensation from the Council of Constance.

Despite political disapproval, it appears that the marriage was happy. Elizabeth often accompanied her husband on various trips, but had little political sway. She fell ill, possibly with tuberculosis, in early 1419 and had trouble keeping up with her husband's travels. She died in May 1420 and was buried in the Wawel Cathedral. However, her body was later moved to make way for Stephen Báthory and the subsequent burial place is not known.

== Issue ==
Elizabeth had six children, most likely by Wincenty Granowski:

- Jadwiga, wife of John of Aleksandrowice
- Otto
- Elizabeth, wife of Bolko V, Duke of Opole
- John
- Agnes
- Eufemia (Ofka), wife of Jan of Jičina, son of Jan (Jańczyk) of Jičina

Elizabeth's descendant in the 5th generation was another Polish queen, Barbara Radziwiłł, wife of Władysław Jagiełło's great-grandson, Sigismund II Augustus.

Elizabeth Granowska Born: c. 1370/1380 Died: 12 May 1420
Royal titles
Preceded by Anna of Celje	Queen consort of Poland; 1417–1420	Succeeded by Sophia of Halshany
Preceded by Anna of Celje and Anna Vytautienė	Grand Duchess consort of Lithuania with Anna Vytautienė and Uliana of Halshany; 1417–1420	Succeeded by Uliana of Halshany and Sophia of Halshany
