= Krystyna Rokiczana =

Polish royal wife from 1356 to 1363

Krystyna
- King's wife

Polish royal consort
- Tenure: 1356–1363
- Died: after 1365
- Spouse: Mikuláš (Mikulasz) of Rokycany; Casimir III of Poland (morganatic)
- Father: Wacław of Praga

Krystyna of Praga, known in historiography mostly by her primo voto name Krystyna of Rokycany (Polish: Krystyna Rokiczana; died after 1365) was the third wife of King Casimir III the Great of Poland. Since she was taken by him as morganatic wife, she did not become a queen consort.

== Life ==
Krystyna is mentioned in several historical sources, including the Spominki o Ciołkach ("Mentions about the Ciołek noble family", 1518), she is also mentioned in documents regarding the annulment of Casimir's loveless marriage to Adelaide of Hesse. Krystyna was the daughter of bailiff Vaclaus of Praga and the widow of Mikuláš (Mikulasz) of Rokycany. When her husband died, Krystyna inherited a large fortune. Krystyna became a lady-in-waiting at the court of Charles IV, Holy Roman Emperor and King of Bohemia.

In May 1356 Casimir III came to Prague, where he met Krystyna and they possibly became engaged. The marriage was concluded shortly afterwards in Kraków. The marriage is believed not to have lasted long; Jan Długosz reported that Krystyna was dismissed from the king shortly after the marriage after the discovery of concealed defects, Krystyna was suffering from hair loss and scabies, it is possible, however, that the relationship lasted a bit longer, an investigation found that Krystyna was still alive in 1365 and was living in Poland. Casimir married for a fourth and final time to Hedwig of Sagan in 1365. This marriage was considered bigamous, with Adelaide still alive and Krystyna possibly still alive. Casimir and Hedwig had four daughters, they were all considered illegitimate until Casimir had them legitimised. Casimir and Krystyna had no children.

The marriage between Casimir and Krystyna was particularly beneficial for the House of Anjou; children that could have come from the marriage of Casimir and Krystyna would be considered illegitimate and even if they were legitimised, their legitimacy would still be in question due to Krystyna's low station. Without sons, Casimir had to give the throne to his sister, Elisabeth of Poland and her son, Louis I of Hungary.

It is unknown when Krystyna died.

== Krystyna in literature ==
Krystyna plays a major role in the novel King of the peasants (1884), by Józef Ignacy Kraszewski. The book is about the history of marriage. Krystyna portrayed as wealthy due to her inheritance from her first husband, well educated, her first husband was a much older man, and her appearance was characterized as the following: snow white complexion, brown hair and eyes, facial features that are strangely beautiful and dignified, she rarely smiled, and when forced to speak through her coral lips, her eyes rarely said anything about her internal emotions.

== Bibliography ==
- Jerzy Wyrozumski, Rokiczana Krystyna, In: Polski Słownik Biograficzny, Volume XXXI, 1989
- Jerzy Wyrozumski, Kazimierz Wielki, Ossolineum, Wroclaw 1982
