= Aldona of Lithuania =

Queen of Poland from 1333 to 1339

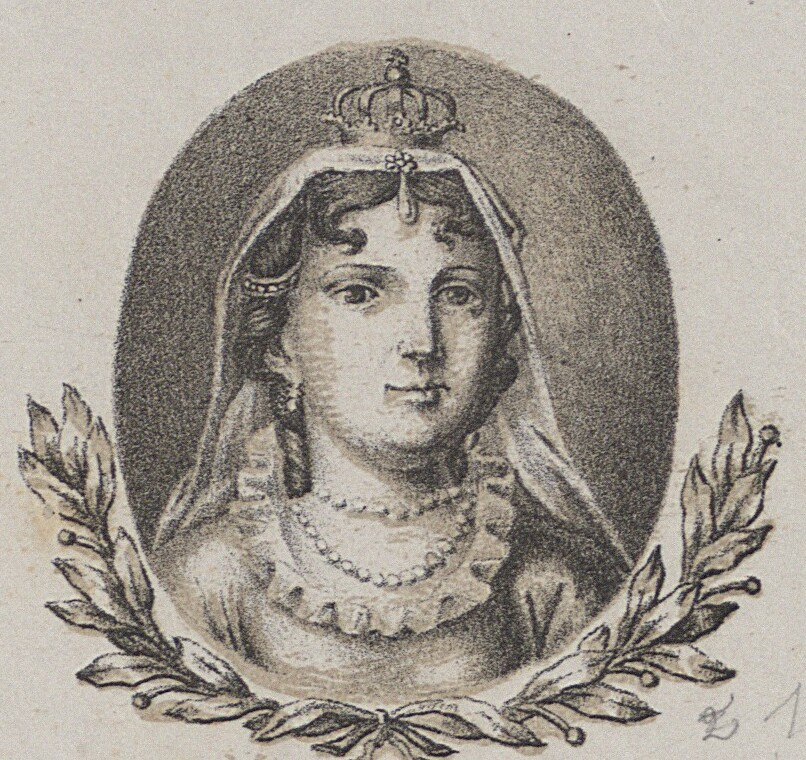

Queen consort of Poland
- Tenure: 1333–1339
- Coronation: 25 April 1333
- Born: c. 1309
- Died: 26 May 1339 (aged 29–30); Kraków, Kingdom of Poland
- Burial: Wawel Cathedral, Kraków
- Spouse: Casimir III
- Issue: Elisabeth; Cunigunde
- House: Gediminas
- Father: Gediminas
- Mother: Jewna

Aldona (baptized Ona or Anna; her pagan name, Aldona, is known only from the writings of Maciej Stryjkowski; c. 1309 – 26 May 1339) was Queen consort of Poland (1333–1339), and a princess of the Grand Duchy of Lithuania. She was the daughter of Gediminas, Grand Duke of Lithuania.

== Biography ==
Aldona married Casimir III of Poland, when he was 15 or 16 years old. The bride was probably of about the same age. The marriage took place on 30 April or 16 October 1325 and was a purely political maneuver to strengthen the first Polish–Lithuanian coalition against the Teutonic Knights. Casimir was seeking allies in the dispute over Pomerania with the Order. Gediminas had just undertaken an unsuccessful attempt to Christianize Lithuania. This coalition was a prelude to the Union of Krewo in 1385, and the Union of Lublin in 1569, which resulted in the creation of a new state, the Polish–Lithuanian Commonwealth. The details of the agreement are not known; however, it is known that Gediminas released all Polish captives, some 25,000 people, who returned to Poland. The importance of the marriage was attested by the fact that Władysław abandoned his earlier plans to marry his son to Jutta of Bohemia. The alliance was put into effect when joint Polish–Lithuanian forces organized an attack against the Margraviate of Brandenburg in 1326. However, the coalition was not strong and collapsed c. 1330. Yet, there is no evidence of fighting between Poland and Lithuania while Aldona was alive. Aldona died suddenly at the end of May 1339, and was buried in Kraków.

Aldona was remembered for her piety and devotion to music. She was accompanied by court musicians wherever she went. It was even suggested by Jan Długosz that the cymbals which were played in procession before her represented a pagan Lithuanian tradition. Her husband Casimir is known for his romantic affairs: after Aldona's death he married three more times.

== Issue ==
Aldona had two daughters:

- Cunigunde of Poland (died in 1357); married on 1 January 1345 Louis VI the Roman, the son of Louis IV, Holy Roman Emperor.
- Elisabeth (1326–1361); married Bogislaus V, Duke of Pomerania. Elisabeth's daughter, Elizabeth of Pomerania, was the fourth wife of Charles IV, Holy Roman Emperor.

== In popular culture ==
=== Film ===
Queen Aldona Anna is one of the main characters in the first season of Polish historical TV drama series "Korona Królów" ("The Crown of the Kings"). She is played by Marta Bryła.

== See also ==
- Family of Gediminas – family tree of Aldona
- Gediminids
- Aldona (fungus) (family Parmulariaceae), was named after her in 1900.

Aldona of Lithuania House of Gediminas Born: 1309 Died: 26 May 1339
Royal titles
Preceded by Jadwiga of Kalisz	Queen consort of Poland; 1333–1339	Vacant Title next held by Adelaide of Hesse
