= Anna of Cilli =

Queen of Poland from 1402 to 1416

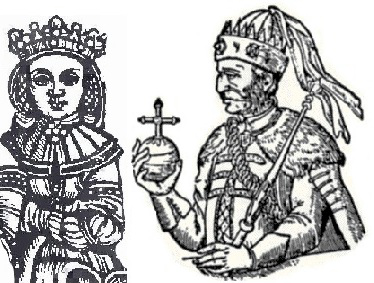
- Anna with Jogaila

Queen consort of Poland Grand Duchess consort of Lithuania
- Tenure: 29 January 1402 – 21 May 1416
- Coronation: 25 February 1403
- Born: 1386; Celje, Slovenia
- Died: 21 May 1416 (aged 29–30); Kraków, Poland
- Burial: Wawel Cathedral
- Spouses: Władysław II Jagiełło
- Issue: Hedwig Jagiellon
- House: Celje
- Father: William, Count of Celje
- Mother: Anna of Poland

Anna of Cilli or Anne of Celje (Slovene: Ana Celjska, Polish: Anna Cylejska; 1386 – 21 May 1416) was Queen of Poland and Grand Duchess consort of Lithuania from 1402 to 1416. She was the second wife of Jogaila (Władysław II Jagiełło), King of Poland and Supreme Duke of Lithuania (reigned 1387–1434). Their marriage was politically motivated to strengthen Jogaila's ties with the Piast dynasty and his claims to the Polish throne. Their marriage was rather distant and during fourteen years Anna bore only one daughter, Hedwig Jagiellon, who died without issue.

== Early life ==
Anna was the only child of William (1361–1392), Count of Celli (Celje), and his wife Anna of Poland (1366–1425), the youngest surviving daughter of the late king Casimir III of Poland. It is likely that Anna was born in Celje Castle (in the Duchy of Styria, now in Slovenia), which was ruled by her father William and his cousin Herman II. William died when Anna was around ten years of age. Two years later, her mother married Ulrich, Duke of Teck, and left Anna in care of Herman II and his wife Anna of Schaunberg in Celje. It is very likely that the girl was illiterate and spoke no Polish.

== Marriage ==
Jogaila's first wife and reigning Queen Jadwiga of Poland, Anna's second cousin, died in July 1399 after childbirth complications, alongside her newborn daughter. Jogaila, who hailed from Lithuania, was left a ruler of a foreign country with no heir. Therefore, he sought a wife from Piast heirs with claims to the Kingdom of Poland to strengthen his claims to Poland and legitimize his rule. In 1401, Jogaila dispatched envoys to Celje to ask Herman II for the hand of Anna. Herman was related to the late queen Jadwiga through his mother's side: his mother Catherine was the sister of Jadwiga's mother Elizabeth of Bosnia, Queen of Hungary (according to some accounts, they were cousins). The House of Celje was thus related to the Polish court on two sides, and the proposed marriage would further strengthen the alliance, while bringing the House of Celje closer to the highest levels of European nobility.

On 16 July 1401 Anna arrived to Kraków where she was met by Jogaila at the city gates. However, Jogaila took a strong dislike to his intended bride. According to Jan Długosz, Jogaila was furious with the envoys who brought Anna to Poland for several years. The wedding was postponed citing the need for Anna to learn Polish. Anna lived in a monastery while Jogaila traveled in eastern territories of his kingdom. He returned only in January 1402. The wedding ceremony took place on 29 January 1402 in Wawel Cathedral. For unknown reasons, Anna's coronation as Queen of Poland was postponed for a year until 25 February 1403.

== Queen ==
The marriage was rather distant. There was an approximately thirty-year age gap between Anna and Jogaila. It was acknowledged that Anna was not a very attractive woman. The King traveled frequently leaving Anna alone in the Wawel Castle. Anna was not very ambitious or politically active. She was known as a religious woman and obedient wife.

In fall 1407, five years after the marriage, Anna was pregnant. Klemens Moskarzewski, Castellan of Wiślica, accused the queen of marital infidelity with Jakub Kobylański and Mikołaj Chrząstowski. Jogaila believed the rumors and imprisoned Jakub. During a congress in Niepołomice, Polish nobles defended the queen and the accusations were dismissed. A year later, Jogaila accused Anna of an affair with Jędrzej Tęczyński, but that case did not reach a public hearing. In 1411, Mikołaj Kurowski, Archbishop of Gniezno, accused Anna again, but he died before the rumors could be investigated.

On 8 April 1408 Anna gave birth to a daughter, Hedwig. It was not a male heir desired by Jogaila or Polish nobles, but it still strengthened Anna's position and she became a little more visible in politics. In February 1410, during the Polish–Lithuanian–Teutonic War, Anna was present when Jogaila met with Herman II. After the Battle of Grunwald, Jogaila wrote two letters – one to Anna and another to Bishop Wojciech Jastrzębiec. In February 1412, Anna and Jogaila hosted the wedding of Ernest, Duke of Austria, and Cymburgis of Masovia. After the wedding, Anna and Jogaila traveled to Hungary for negotiations between Jogaila and Sigismund von Luxembourg. Anna met with Barbara of Cilli, Sigismund's wife and daughter of Herman II – the girls grew up together. However, Anna did not participate in the negotiations in Buda between April and August 1412.

In early 1413, Anna's five-year-old daughter Hedwig was officially proclaimed heir presumptive to the Polish throne during a congress in Jedlnia. It was an important political victory for Anna. Jogaila, Anna, and Hedwig traveled to Lithuania to introduce the princess to the Lithuanian nobility. There the Union of Horodło was signed in October 1413. Anna also visited Samogitia to observe its Christianization; later she sent a report to the Council of Constance. In early 1415, Anna traveled with Jogaila and in May met with Alexander I of Moldavia in Sniatyn. It was her last known political action.

== Death ==
At the end of 1415, Jogaila traveled to Lithuania while Anna stayed in Kraków, perhaps already ill. In February 1416, a special envoy was dispatched to inform Jogaila that the queen was seriously ill. Despite the news, Jogaila did not hurry back to Kraków. He reached the capital city only in May and Anna died after a few days. She was buried in Wawel Cathedral.

Anna of Cilli House of Celje Born: ca. 1381 Died: 21 May 1416
Royal titles
Preceded by Vacant ( Jadwiga Anjou and Jagiełło as co-ruling spouses)	Queen consort of Poland; 1402–1416	Succeeded by Elizabeth of Pilica
Preceded by Jadwiga Anjou and Anna Vytautienė	Grand Duchess consort of Lithuania; 1402–1416 with Anna Vytautienė	Succeeded by Anna Vytautienė and Elizabeth of Pilica
