= Henry II of Hesse =

Landgrave of Hesse from 1328 to 1376

Henry II
- Landgrave of Hesse
- Born: 1299
- Died: 3 June 1376 (aged 76–77)
- Noble family: House of Hesse
- Spouse: Elisabeth of Thuringia
- Issue: Otto the Younger; Adelaide; Elisabeth; Jutta; Margarethe
- Father: Otto I, Landgrave of Hesse
- Mother: Adelheid of Ravensberg

Henry II of Hesse (German: Heinrich; c. 1299 – 3 June 1376), called "the Iron", was Landgrave of Hesse from 1328–1376.

Henry was the son of Otto I, Landgrave of Hesse and Adelheid of Ravensburg. With his wife Elisabeth of Thuringia, daughter of Frederick I, Margrave of Meissen, he had five children:

- Otto the Younger (1322c–1366);
- Adelaide of Hesse (1323/1324–1370), later wife of Casimir III of Poland;
- Elisabeth [1329c–1390] later wife of Ernest I, Duke of Brunswick-Göttingen;
- Jutta/Judith; died in infancy;
- Margarethe, a nun in Haidau monastery.

When Henry's son Otto died in 1366, his nephew Hermann was named co-regent. This caused fighting to break out with Otto of Brunswick. To defray the costs of the conflict with Brunswick, Henry levied a tax on all imported goods.

Henry II of Hesse House of Hesse Born: 1299 Died: 3 June 1376
Regnal titles
Preceded by Otto I, Landgrave of Hesse	Landgrave of Hesse; 1328 – 1376	Succeeded by Hermann II, Landgrave of Hesse
