= Casimir III the Great =

King of Poland from 1333 to 1370

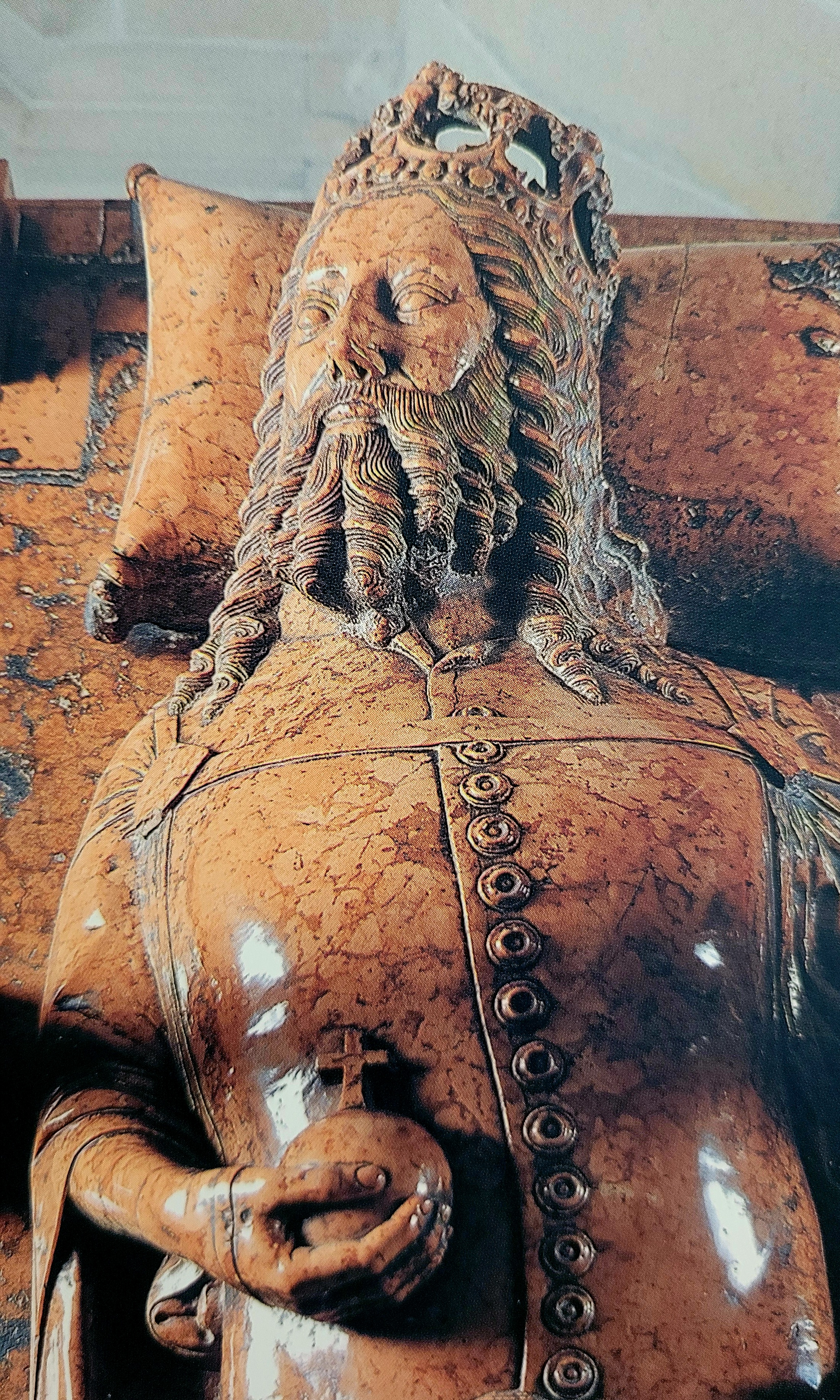
- Casimir's tomb effigy at Wawel Cathedral

King of Poland
- Reign: 1333 – 1370
- Coronation: 25 April 1333
- Predecessor: Władysław I Łokietek
- Successor: Louis I of Hungary

King of Ruthenia
- Reign: 1349 – 1370
- Predecessor: Yuri II of Galicia
- Successor: Louis I of Hungary
- Born: 30 April 1310; Kowal, Duchy of Brześć Kujawski
- Died: 5 November 1370 (aged 60); Kraków, Poland
- Burial: Wawel Cathedral, Kraków
- Spouse: Aldona of Lithuania; Adelaide of Hesse; Krystyna Rokiczana (morganatic); Hedwig of Sagan
- Issue more...: Elisabeth, Duchess of Pomerania; Anna, Countess of Cilli
- House: Piast
- Father: Ladislaus the Short
- Mother: Jadwiga of Kalisz
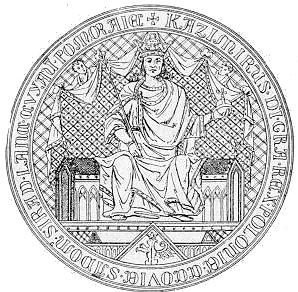
- Signature

Casimir III the Great (Polish: Kazimierz III Wielki; 30 April 1310 – 5 November 1370) reigned as the King of Poland from 1333 to 1370. He also later became King of Ruthenia in 1340, retaining the title throughout the Galicia–Volhynia Wars. He was the last Polish king from the Piast dynasty.

Casimir's reign was marked by a pragmatic foreign policy that prioritised stability over military expansion. He strengthened the Polish army and normalised relations with the Kingdom of Bohemia as well as the Teutonic Order, often through treaties and legal arbitration rather than war. While accepting the loss of Silesia to Bohemia stemming from ducal fragmentation, he successfully expanded Polish influence eastward, annexing Red Ruthenia, which increased the kingdom's territory, population, and economic potential. These diplomatic choices allowed Poland to avoid costly conflicts and focus on internal consolidation.

Domestically, Casimir undertook extensive legal and administrative reforms that laid the foundations of a more centralized state. He codified Polish law in the Statutes of Wiślica and Piotrków, reducing legal division and reinforcing royal authority. His reforms of the judiciary gained him the unofficial title "the Polish Justinian". His reign saw the growth of towns under Magdeburg rights, improvements in taxation and administration, and significant investment in infrastructure, including the construction of stone castles and fortified towns. Casimir was also known for confirming and extending protections for Jewish communities, building on earlier privileges and fostering economic development through trade and finance. He also encouraged the Jews to settle in great numbers.

Casimir III was a notable patron of learning and culture, most famously founding the University of Kraków in 1364, which became a lasting center of scholarship in Central Europe and remains one of the oldest institutions of higher learning in the world. Despite his achievements, he left no legitimate male heir, and upon his death the Polish crown passed to his nephew, Louis I of Hungary, thus ending the centuries-long Piast dynasty's rule and introducing a personal union with Hungary. Casimir's legacy endured, however, in the strengthened institutions, expanded territory, and relative prosperity of the Polish state, securing his reputation as one of Poland's most effective and influential medieval monarchs.

== Biography ==
=== Early life ===
Casimir was born on 30 April 1310 in Kowal, Kuyavia, the third son of Władysław I Łokietek (Ladislaus the Short) and Jadwiga of Kalisz. At the time of Kazimierz's birth, his father was one of the most powerful Polish princes, ruling over most of Lesser Poland and Kuyavia, including the capital of the kingdom, Kraków. Ladislaus had royal ambitions, which were rekindled by the deaths in 1305 of Wenceslaus II and, a year later, Wenceslaus III, kings of Bohemia, who also ruled over a significant part of Poland and were kings of Poland. In 1311, the legal title to the Polish crown was taken over by the new Bohemia king, John of Bohemia, who, although he was never crowned, used the title of Polish king until 1335.

Through considerable military and diplomatic effort, Ladislaus managed to take control of a large part of the Polish lands and was crowned king in Kraków on 20 January 1320. A sign of his growing political importance was the marriage of his daughter Elizabeth to the Hungarian king Charles I of Hungary on 6 June 1320.

It was probably around that time that the king began to look for a bride for his son and only heir. According to some accounts, the first candidate was Jutta, daughter of John of Bohemia, but these plans never came to fruition. Subsequently, seeking allies against the Teutonic Order, the king turned to Gediminas, Grand Duke of Lithuania, who in 1323 announced his willingness to accept baptism. The marriage of Casimir to the Lithuanian princess Aldona of Lithuania took place on 16 October 1325, at Wawel Cathedral.

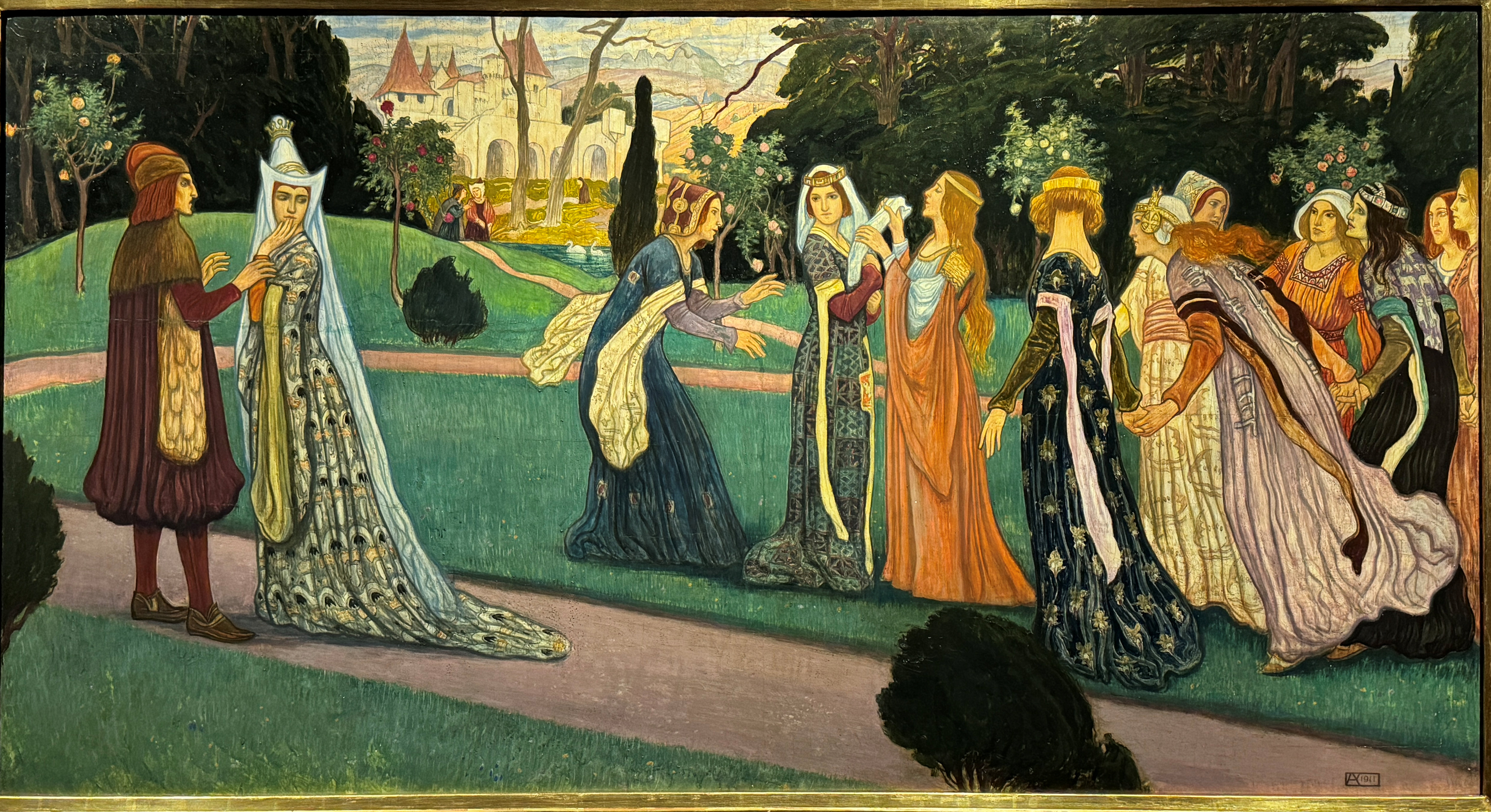
Aladár Körösfői-Kriesch, Klára Zách I, 1911. A painting by a Hungarian Art Nouveau painter depicts a younger Casimir in the company of his sister, Queen Elizabeth (on the left), conversing and observing the innocent Klára Záh, who stands at the center of the composition surrounded by ladies of the court.

An important episode in Casimir's youth was his stay at the Buda court on a diplomatic mission around 1329/1330. There, he became involved in a romance with Klára Záh, the daughter of the Hungarian magnate Felician Záh. Klara's father learned of the affair only after Casimir had left Hungary. Seeking revenge for the dishonor brought upon his daughter, and accusing Queen Elizabeth, Casimir's sister, of complicity, he burst into Buda Castle during a royal feast and attacked the royal couple, wounding the king and cutting off the queen's fingers. Záh was killed on the spot, and his family suffered severe repressions.

Meanwhile, Poland became entangled in a war with the King of Bohemia, who sought to reclaim the Kraków throne, aided by Brandenburg and the Teutonic Order. Although Poland was supported by Lithuania and Hungary, the war did not go well for her. Władysław managed to defend his crown, yet the overall outcome of the conflict was unfavourable. The Teutonic Order seized Kuyavia, a move later confirmed by John of Bohemia, while John himself occupied the Dobrzyń Land, driving out Ladislaus' cousins, and received homage from the Duke of Płock and most of the Silesian princes as King of Poland.

In 1331, Casimir was granted the governorship of Greater Poland and Kuyavia, thus becoming both a witness to and a participant in the wars that were going unfavorably for the kingdom. After concluding a truce with the Teutonic Knights, King Władysław went to Greater Poland to deal with the Dukes of Głogów, who ruled over the southern part of that province and supported the Teutonic Order. In the fighting, Casimir distinguished himself by leading his Polish-Hungarian unit in a successful assault on besieged Kościan, during which he carried out a massacre of its defenders.

At the time of his father's death on 2 March 1333, he inherited a small and weakened realm consisting of two ravaged provinces, Lesser Poland and Greater Poland, between which lay the Łęczyca and Sieradz lands, granted in lifetime administration to the Kuyavian Piasts as compensation.

=== Reign ===
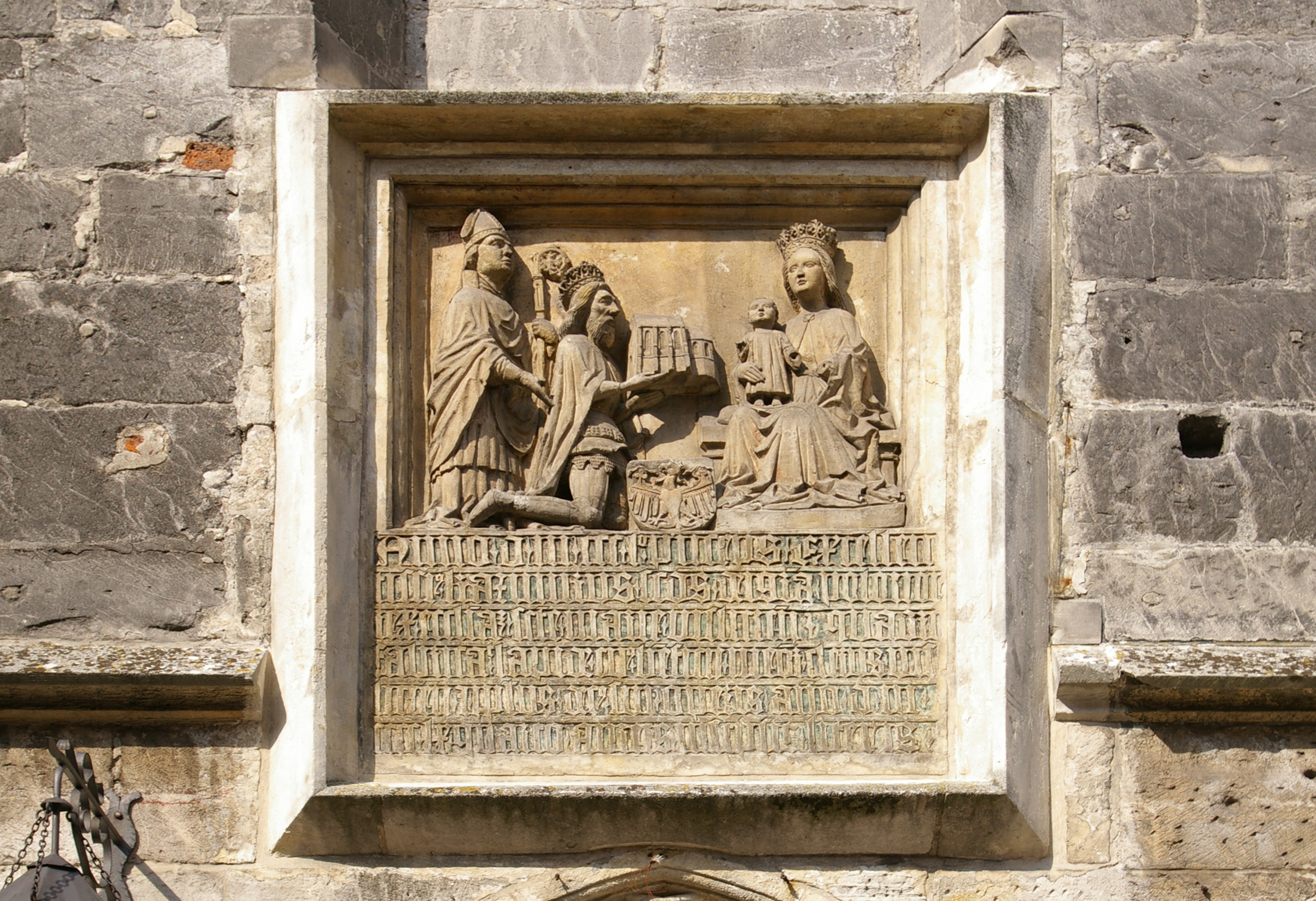
A foundation stone for the Basilica at Wiślica, with Casimir kneeling beneath the Virgin Mary.

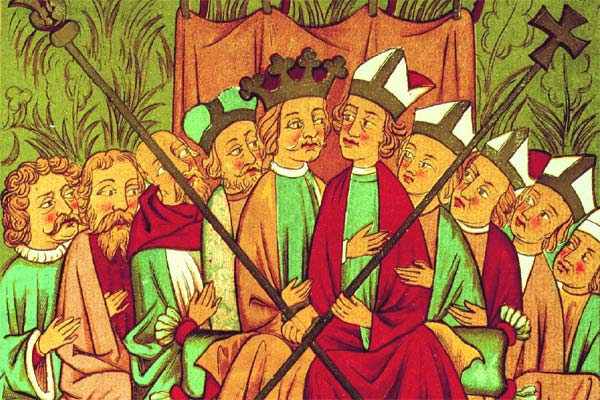
A wiec (council) under the reign of Casimir the Great

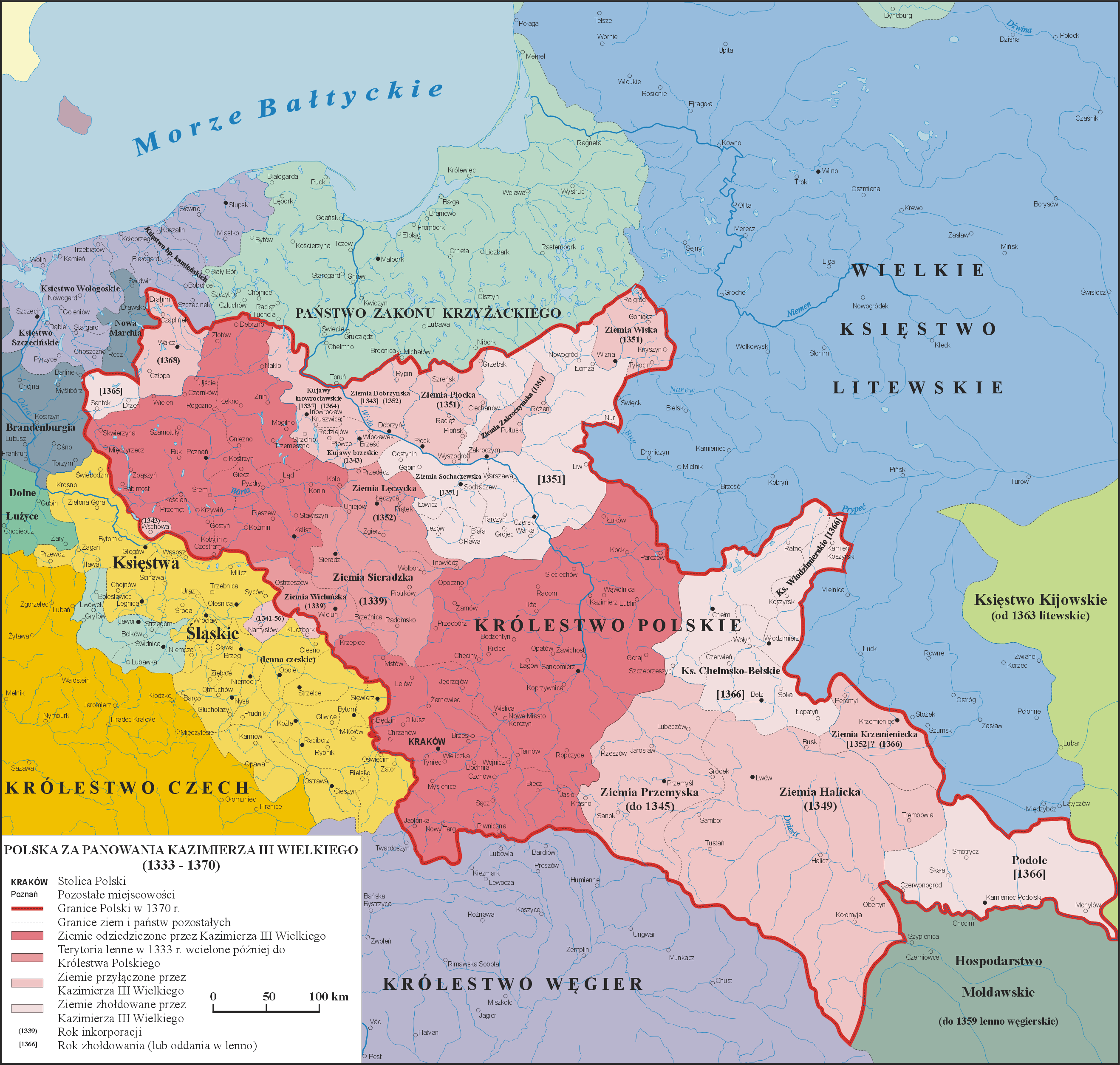
Poland (red) at the end of the reign of Casimir III (1370); Silesia (yellow) had been lost, but the kingdom was expanding to the east

Succession to the throne by Casimir met with no major obstacles. The king was crowned at Wawel Cathedral on 25 April 1333, eight weeks after his father's death. The coronation was performed by Archbishop Janisław of Gniezno, assisted by Bishop Jan Grot of Kraków and Bishop Jan Doliwa of Poznań. Casimir's wife, Aldona of Lithuania, was crowned alongside him. The king's mother, Jadwiga of Kalisz, withdrew to the convent of the Poor Clares in Stary Sącz.

The political situation of Poland, however, was very difficult. The Bohemia king, John of Bohemia, was still widely regarded as the rightful king of Poland and remained formally at war with Casimir. As such, he was the overlord of the Silesian dukes (with the exception of the Duchy of Świdnica) and the Duke of Płock, whose lands surrounded Casimir's small realm. The truce with the Teutonic Order had been extended before the coronation, but it was set to expire in mid-1334. Casimir's only strong asset was his alliance with Hungary. The alliance with Lithuania had weakened and was also politically inconvenient, as the Lithuanians still adhered to paganism.

In order to improve the political situation, Casimir launched a diplomatic campaign. He first extended the truce with the Teutonic Order for another year, and then, in July 1333, signed a peace treaty with Louis V, Duke of Bavaria, Margrave of Brandenburg, the emperor's son.

New prospects opened for Casimir after the death of Henry of Bohemia, Duke of Carinthia and Tyrol, former King of Bohemia, whose inheritance became the subject of rivalry among the Habsburgs, Luxembourgs and Wittelsbachs. Casimir skillfully maneuvered between these powerful German dynasties. In May 1335, he began negotiations for a marriage between his daughter and the emperor's younger son, Louis II, Elector of Brandenburg. The Luxembourgs, alarmed by this rapprochement, sent Charles, Margrave of Moravia and son of King John, to Kraków with a proposal to settle all disputes amicably.

Meanwhile, in June 1335, an agreement was signed in Chojna, setting the terms for the marriage of Elizabeth, younger daughter of Casimir, to Louis II, Elector of Brandenburg and establishing an alliance between Poland and the Empire. At the same time, Casimir dispatched an embassy to Trenčín, where a meeting was taking place between John of Bohemia, his son Charles, and the Hungarian king Charles I of Hungary. On 24 August 1335, after the meeting, the Polish envoys issued a document stating that the Luxembourgs were ready to renounce the title of Kings of Poland in exchange for Casimir's pledge not to infringe upon Bohemian possessions in Silesia and Mazovia. Following the meeting, the Bohemian chancery ceased to style John as King of Poland and Casimir as King of Kraków. Casimir, however, delayed the ratification of this agreement. At the same time, in July 1335, he submitted a complaint to Pope Benedict XII against the Teutonic Order for seizing lands belonging to the Polish kingdom, while the Primate of Poland accused the Order of destroying churches and plundering church property. The Pope initiated an investigation into the matter, delegating it to two cardinals.

Meanwhile, the Polish–Teutonic dispute was also being settled by an arbitration court, a process already initiated by Władysław I Łokietek. The court convened in Visegrád, with John of Bohemia and Charles I of Hungary acting as arbiters. It was the first personal meeting of the three monarchs. The verdict was issued in November 1335. John of Bohemia annulled the grant of the Dobrzyń Land and Kuyavia to the Teutonic Knights, and these territories were to be returned to the Kingdom of Poland. In return, Casimir was forced to renounce Pomerania and the Chełmno Land, which were formally declared a perpetual alms of the King of Poland to the Teutonic Order.

Casimir began to rebuild the country and strengthen its defenses. During his reign, nearly 30 towns were supplied with fortification walls and some 50 castles were constructed, including castles along the Trail of the Eagle's Nests. These achievements are still celebrated today, in a commonly-known ditty that translates as follows: inherited wooden towns and left them fortified with stone and brick (Kazimierz Wielki zastał Polskę drewnianą, a zostawił murowaną).

Casimir successfully introduced quarantine during the spread of Black Death, which greatly reduced casualties. Studies of grain production in Poland at the time indicate that there was minimal disruption.

He organised a meeting of kings in Kraków in 1364, at which he exhibited the wealth of the Polish kingdom. Casimir is the only king in Polish history to both receive and retain the title of "Great", as Bolesław I is more commonly known as "the Brave".

=== Reforms ===
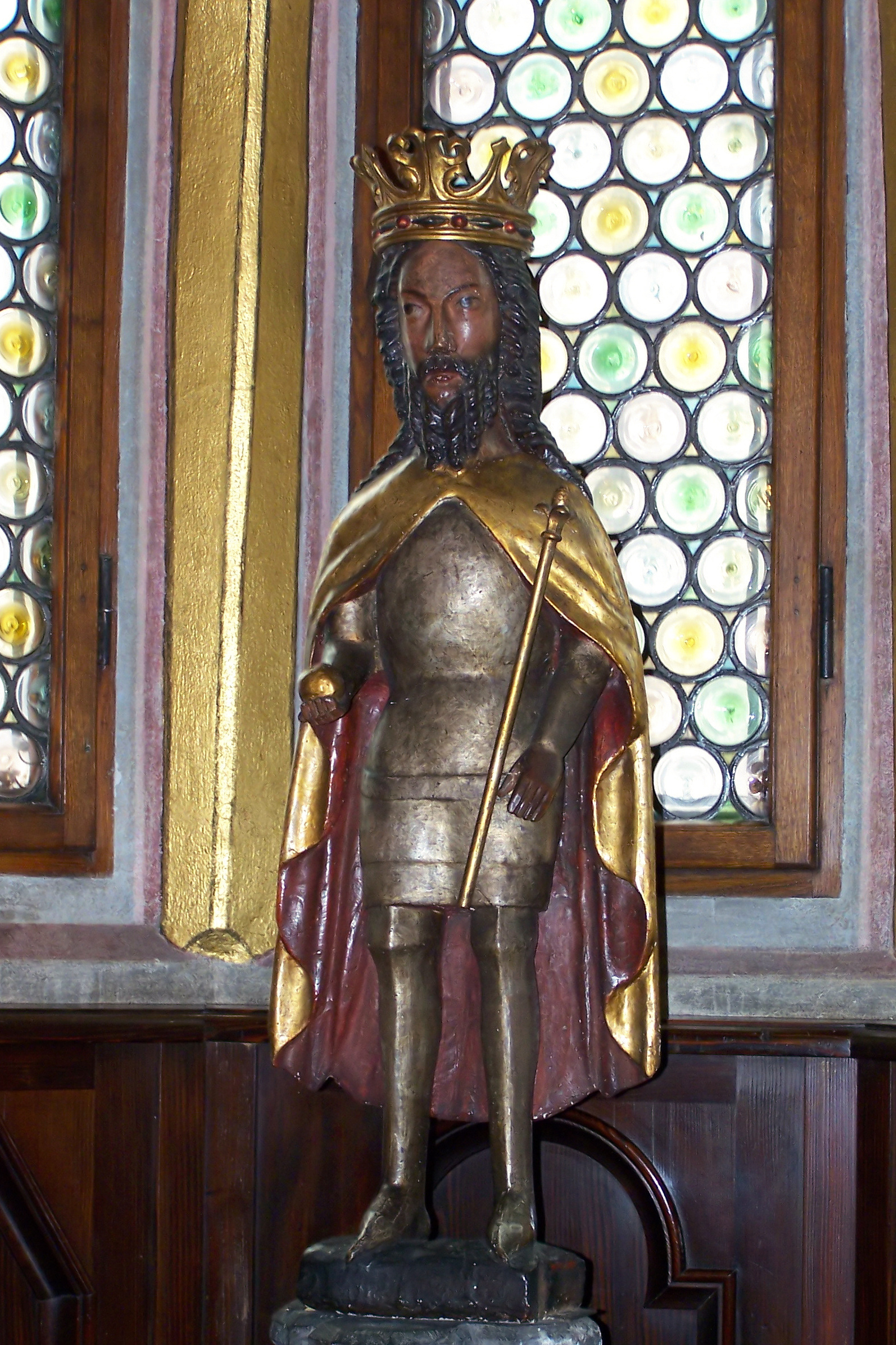
A gilded statue of Casimir from c. 1380, held at the Jagiellonian University in Kraków which he founded in 1364.

Casimir ensured stability and great prospects for the future of the country. He established the Corona Regni Poloniae – the Crown of the Polish Kingdom, which certified the existence of the Polish lands independently from the monarch. Prior to that, the lands were only the property of the Piast dynasty.

At the Sejm in Wiślica, on 11 March 1347, Casimir introduced reforms to the Polish judicial system and sanctioned civil and criminal codes for Great and Lesser Poland, earning the title "the Polish Justinian". In 1364, having received permission from Pope Urban V, Casimir established the University of Kraków, now the oldest university in Poland. It was regarded as a rare distinction, since it was only the second university founded in Central Europe, after the Charles University in Prague.

=== Politics and expansion ===
Casimir demonstrated competence in foreign diplomacy and managed to double the size of his kingdom. He neutralized relations with potential enemies to the west and north and began to expand his territory eastward. He conquered the Kingdom of Galicia–Volhynia (in modern-day Ukraine), known in Polish history as Red Ruthenia. By extending the borders far southeast, the Polish kingdom gained access to the lucrative Black Sea trade.

=== Succession ===
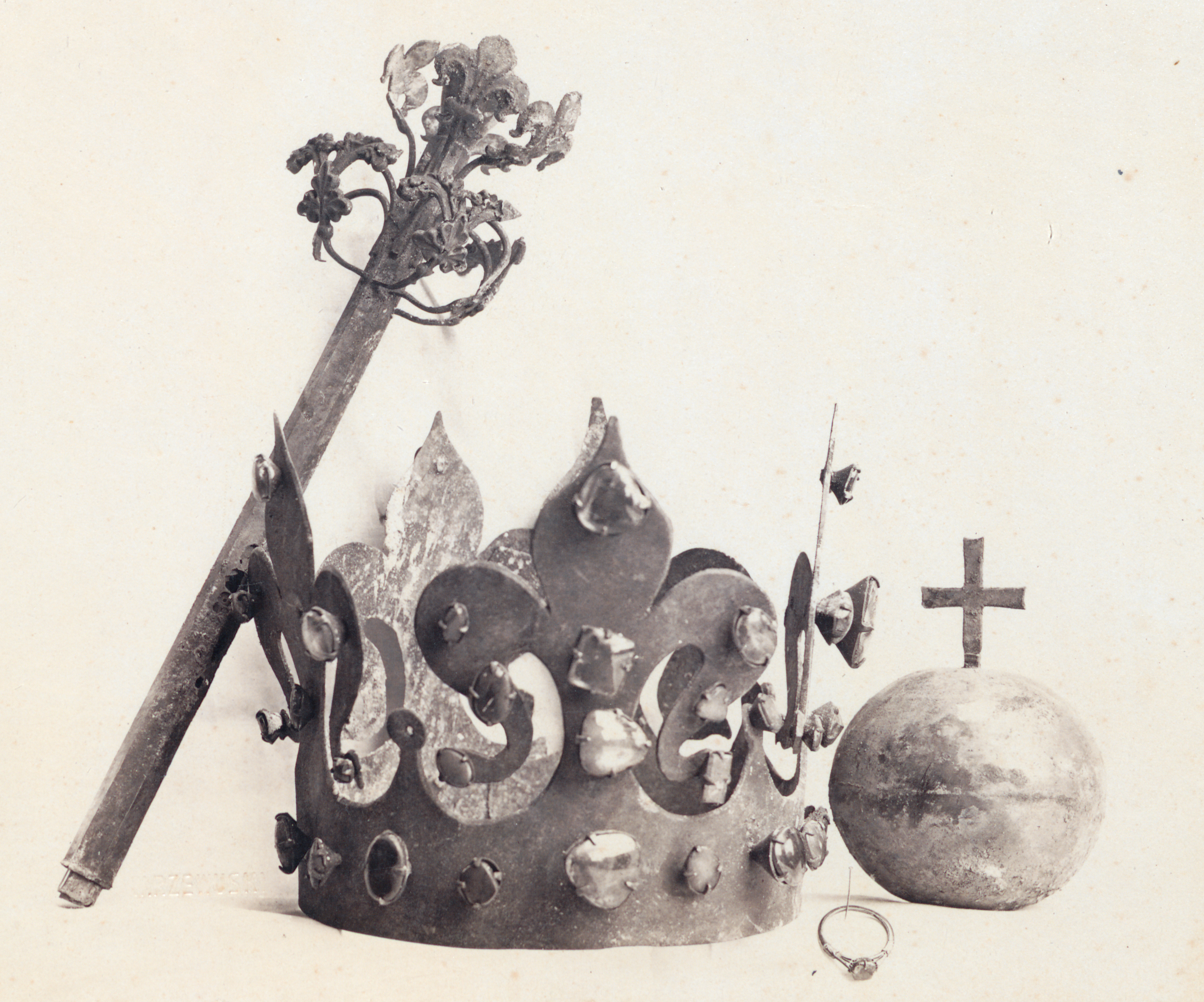
An early photograph of Casimir's burial crown and insignia extracted from his tomb in 1869.

In 1355, in Buda, Casimir designated his nephew Louis I of Hungary as his successor should he produce no male heir, just as his father had with Charles I of Hungary to gain help against Bohemia. In exchange, Casimir gained a favourable Hungarian attitude, needed in disputes with the hostile Teutonic Order and the Kingdom of Bohemia. At the time, Casimir was 45 years old and so producing a son did not seem unreasonable.

Casimir left no legal son; however, begetting five daughters instead. He tried to adopt his grandson, Casimir IV, Duke of Pomerania, in his last will. The child had been born to his eldest daughter, Elizabeth of Poland, Duchess of Pomerania, in 1351. This part of the testament was invalidated by Louis I of Hungary, however, who had traveled to Kraków quickly after Casimir died (in 1370) and bribed the nobles with future privileges. Casimir III also had a son-in-law, Louis II, Elector of Brandenburg of Bavaria, Margrave and Prince-elector of Brandenburg, who was considered a possible successor, but he was deemed ineligible as his wife, Casimir's daughter Cunigunde, had died in 1357 without issue. Thus, King Louis I of Hungary became the successor in Poland. Louis was proclaimed king upon Casimir's death in 1370, though Casimir's sister Elisabeth, Louis's mother, held much of the real power until her death in 1380.

=== Society ===
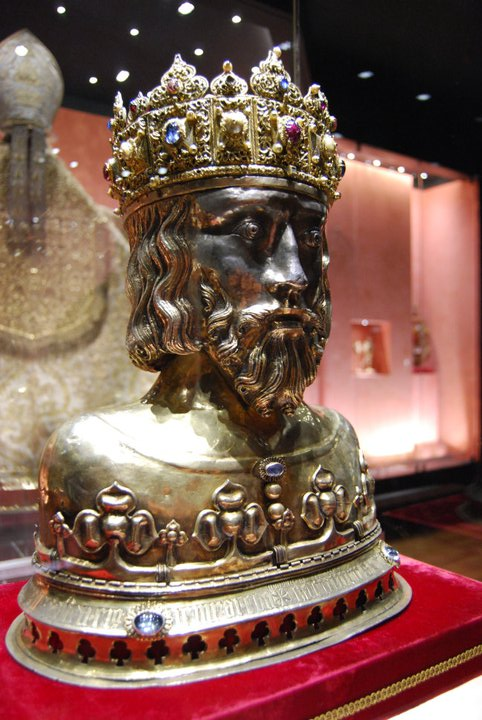
The reliquary (herm) of Saint Sigismund held in Płock likely depicts Casimir's physiognomy.

Casimir was facetiously named "the Peasants' King". He introduced the codes of law of Greater and Lesser Poland as an attempt to end the overwhelming superiority of the nobility. During his reign, all three major classes — the nobility, priesthood, and bourgeoisie — were more or less counterbalanced, allowing Casimir to strengthen his monarchic position. He was known for siding with the weak when the law did not protect them from nobles and clergymen. He reportedly even supported a peasant whose house had been demolished by his own mistress, after she had ordered it to be pulled down because it disturbed her enjoyment of the beautiful landscape.

His popularity with the peasants helped to rebuild the country, as part of the reconstruction program was funded by a land tax paid by the lower social class.

=== Relationship with Jews ===
On 9 October 1334, Casimir confirmed the privileges granted to Jews in 1264 by Bolesław V the Chaste. Under penalty of death, he prohibited the kidnapping of Jewish children for the purpose of enforced baptism, and he inflicted heavy punishment for the desecration of Jewish cemeteries. While Jews had lived in Poland since before his reign, Casimir allowed them to settle in Poland in great numbers and protected them as "people of the king". About 70% of the world's European Jews, or Ashkenazi, can trace their ancestry to Poland due to Casimir's reforms. Casimir's legendary Jewish mistress Esterka remains unconfirmed by direct historical evidence.

== Family ==
Casimir III was married four times:

=== Aldona of Lithuania ===
On 30 April or 16 October 1325, Casimir married Aldona of Lithuania, (Note: She was also known as Anna, possibly a baptismal name.) daughter of the Grand Duke of Lithuania Gediminas and Jaunė. They had:

- Elisabeth of Poland (ca. 1326–1361); married Bogislaw V, Duke of Pomerania;
- Cunigunde of Poland (1334–1357); married Louis II, Elector of Brandenburg, the son of Louis IV, Holy Roman Emperor
- Anna.

Aldona died on 26 May 1339. Casimir III remained a widower for two years.

=== Adelaide of Hesse ===
On 29 September 1341, Casimir married his second wife, Adelaide of Hesse. She was the daughter of Henry II, Landgrave of Hesse and Elisabeth of Thuringia. They had no children. Casimir started living separately from Adelaide soon after the marriage. Their loveless marriage lasted until 1356, when he declared himself divorced.

=== Krystyna Rokiczana ===
After Casimir "divorced" Adelaide, he married his mistress Krystyna Rokiczana, the widow of Mikuláš of Rokycany, a wealthy merchant. Her own origins are unknown. Following the death of her first husband, she had entered the court of Bohemia in Prague as a lady-in-waiting. Casimir brought her with him from Prague and convinced the abbot of the Benedictine abbey of Tyniec to marry them. The marriage was held in a secret ceremony, but soon became known. Queen Adelaide renounced it as bigamous and returned to Hesse. Casimir continued living with Krystyna despite complaints by Pope Innocent VI on behalf of Queen Adelaide. This marriage lasted until 1363–1364, when Casimir again declared himself divorced. They had no children.

=== Hedwig of Sagan ===
In about 1365, Casimir married his fourth wife Hedwig of Sagan. She was the daughter of Henry V the Iron, Duke of Żagań and Anna of Mazovia. They had three children:

- Anna of Poland, Countess of Celje (1366–9 June 1422); married firstly William, Count of Celje; their only daughter was Anne of Cilli, who married Władysław II Jagiełło when he was king of Poland (as Władysław II Jagiełło). Anna married secondly Ulrich, Duke of Teck; they had no children;
- Kunigunde of Poland (1367–1370);
- Jadwiga of Poland (1368–ca 1382).

As Adelaide was still alive (and possibly Krystyna as well), the marriage to Hedwig was also considered bigamous. Because of this, the legitimacy of his three young daughters was disputed. Casimir managed to have Anna and Kunigunde legitimised by Pope Urban V on 5 December 1369. Jadwiga the younger was legitimised by Pope Gregory XI on 11 October 1371 (after Casimir's death).

== Title and style ==
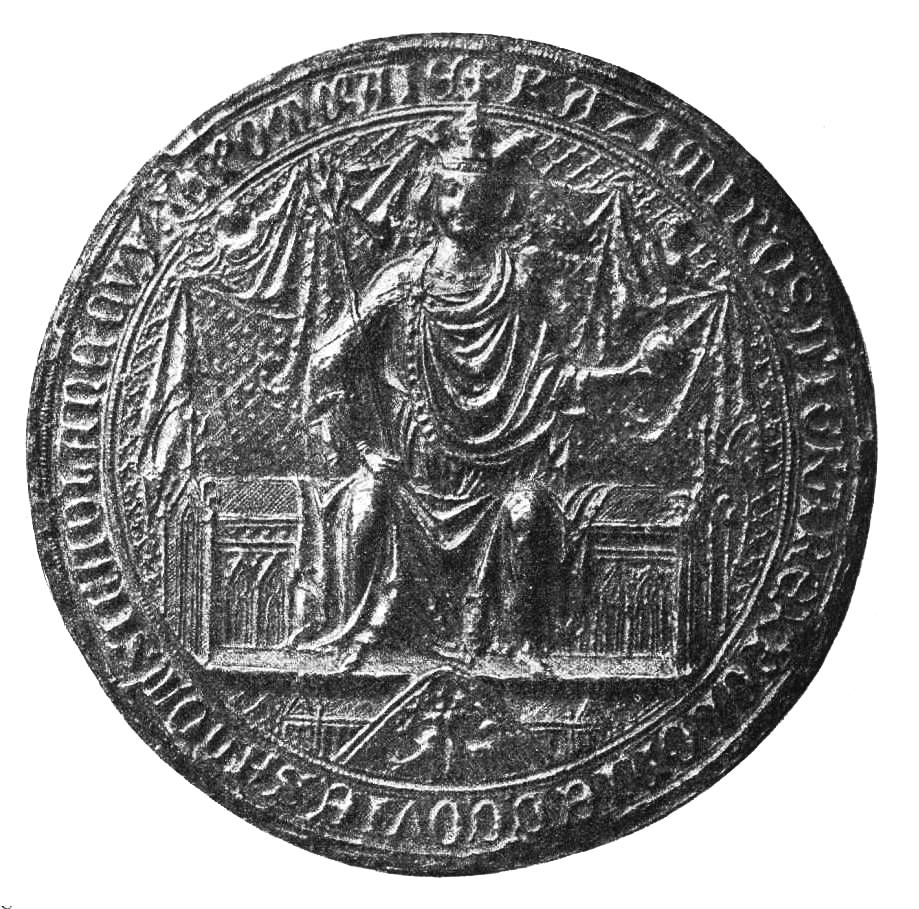
Casimir's depiction on a seal

Casimir's full title was: Casimir by the grace of God king of Poland and Rus' (Ruthenia), lord and heir of the land of Kraków, Sandomierz, Sieradz, Łęczyca, Kuyavia, Pomerania (Pomerelia). The title in Latin was: Kazimirus, Dei gratia rex Polonie et Russie, nec non Cracovie, Sandomirie, Siradie, Lancicie, Cuiavie, et Pomeranieque Terrarum et Ducatuum Dominus et Heres.

== Popular culture ==
=== Film ===
- Casimir III the Great is one of the main characters in Polish historical drama series Korona królów (The Crown of the Kings). He is played by Mateusz Król (season 1) and Andrzej Hausner (season 2);
- Casimir III the Great is mentioned in a speech by Amon Göth in the film Schindler's List.

=== Video games ===
- Casimir features as a playable leader in the 2010 strategy game Civilization V, having been added in its 2013 expansion, Brave New World;
- Casimir also features as a ruler in the strategy game Crusader Kings II;
- Casimir also features as a ruler in the strategy game Age of History II;
- Casimir features as a playable ruler in the strategy game Europa Universalis V.

=== Currency ===
- Casimir is featured on the obverse of the 50 Polish złoty banknote, with his regalia on the reverse.

== Gallery ==
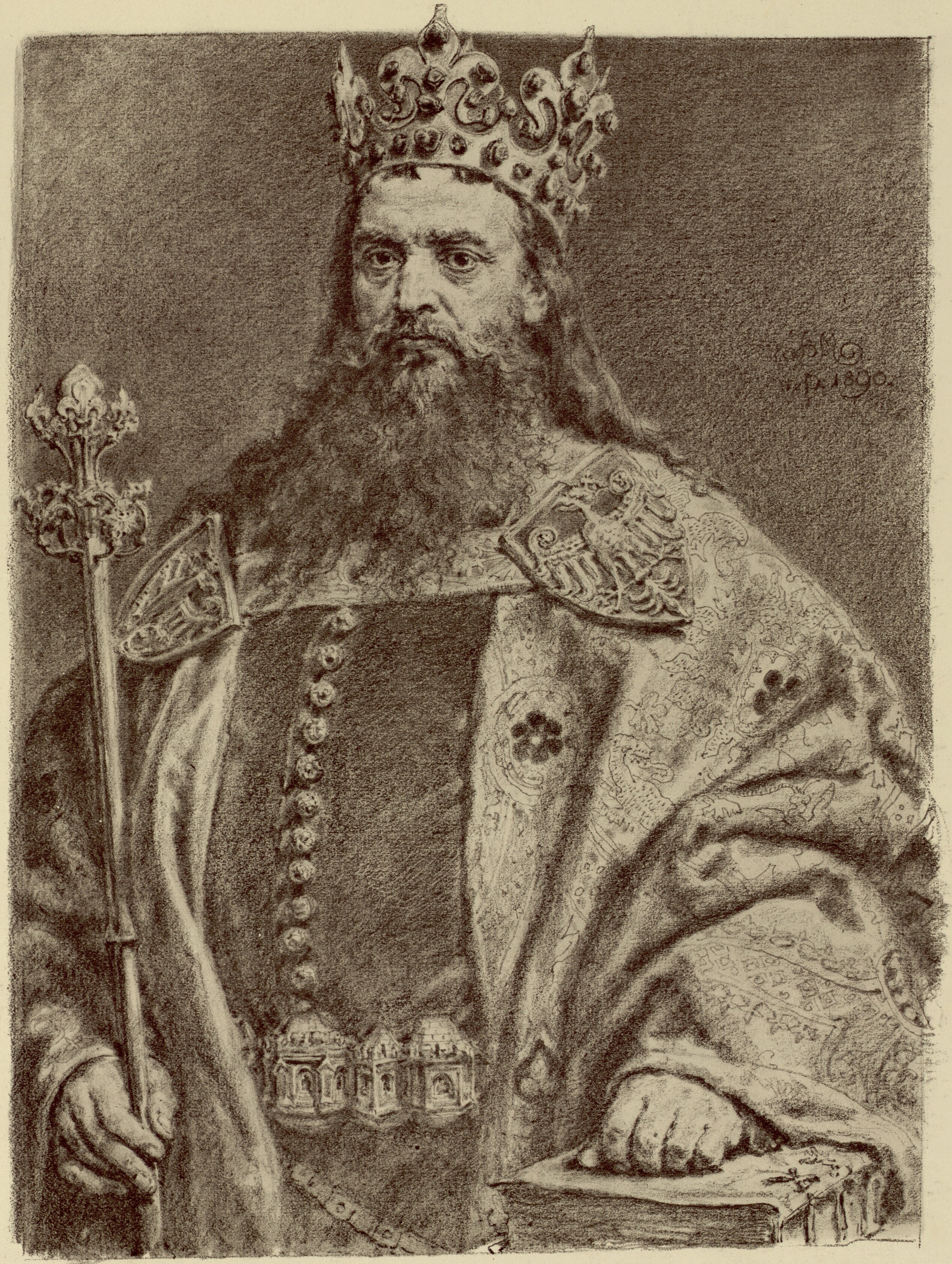
Casimir III the Great by Jan Matejko

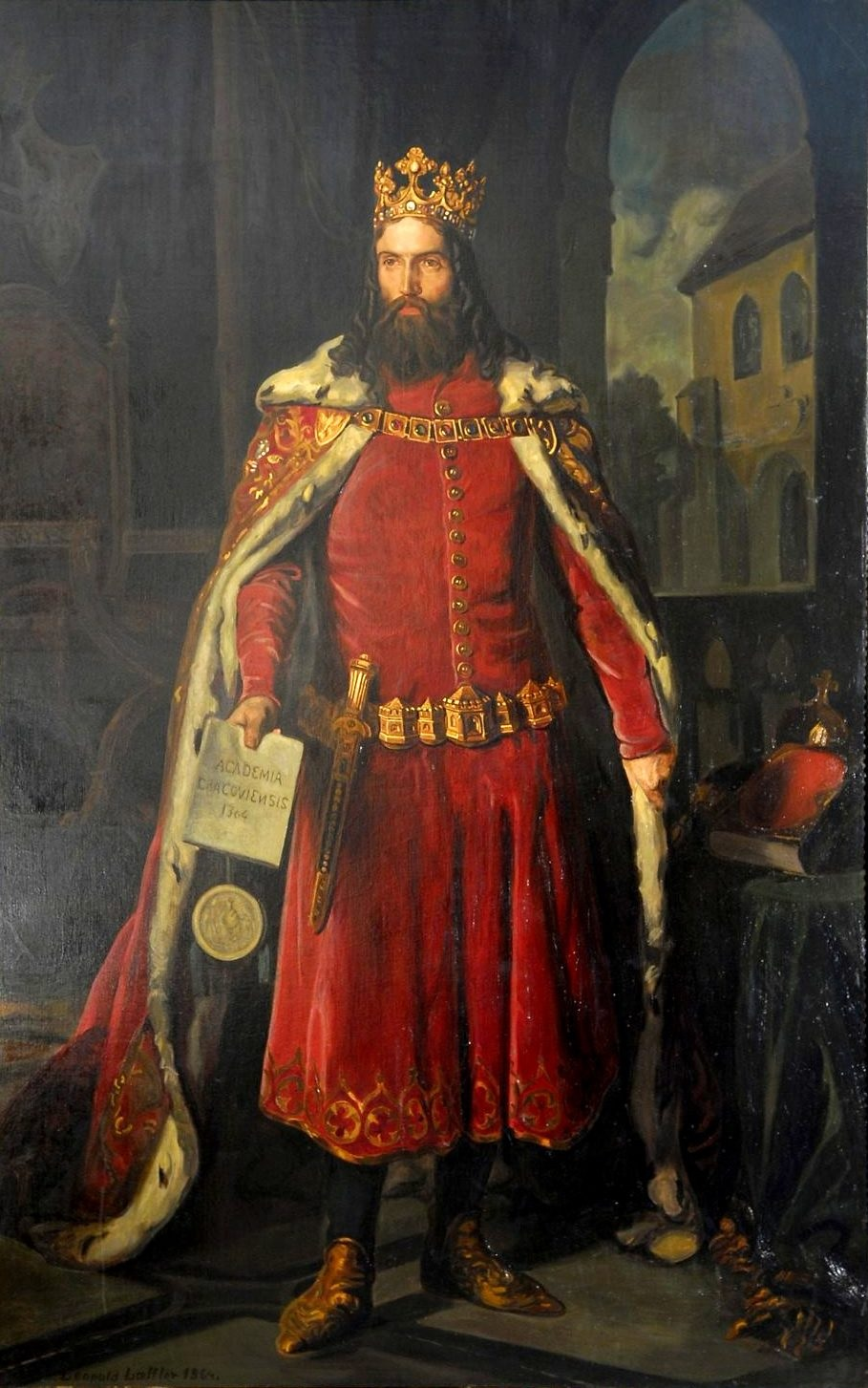
Casimir the Great by Leopold Loeffler

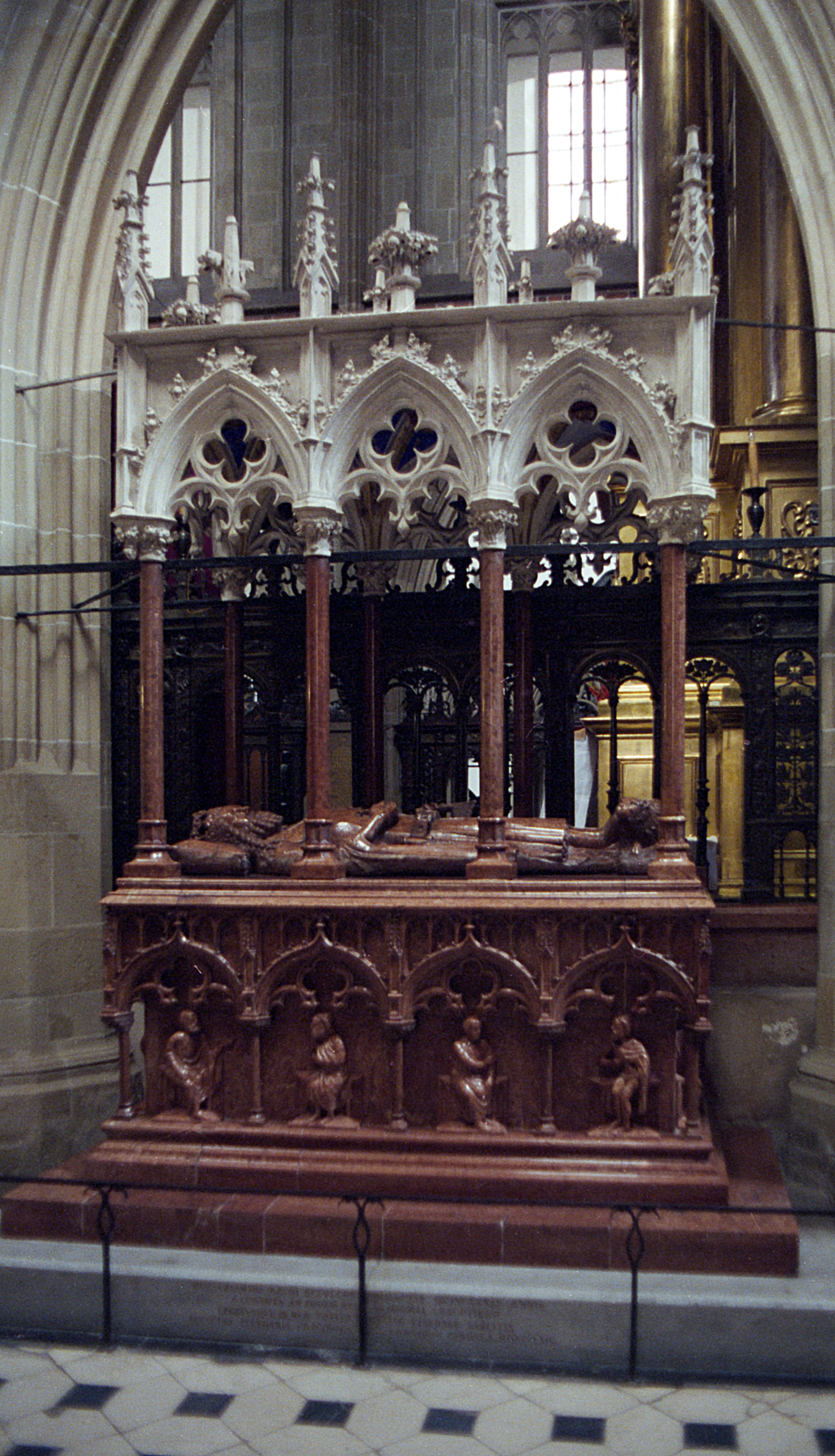
Casimir III's tomb at Wawel Cathedral

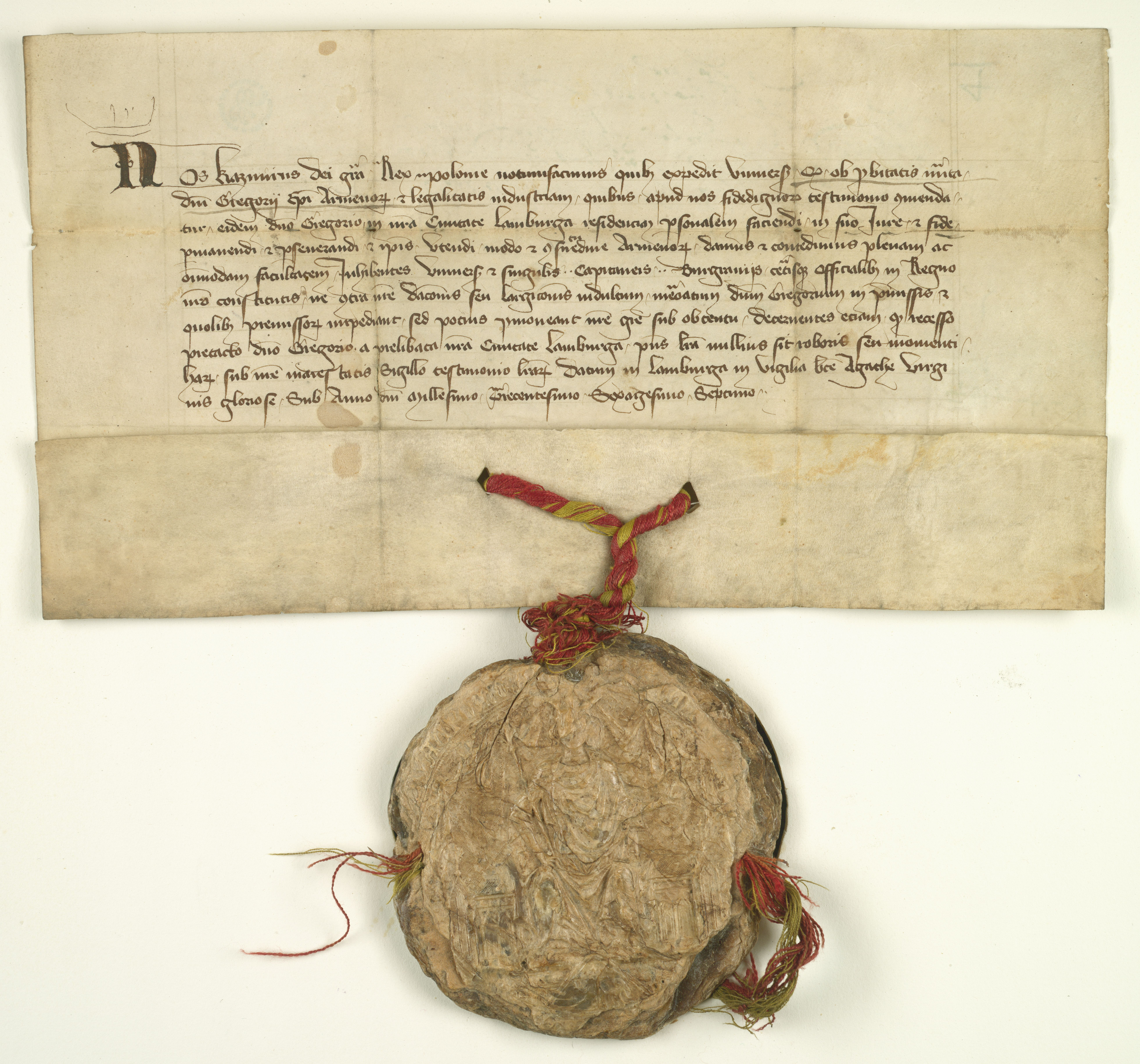
Document issued by Casimir the Great granting the Armenian bishop Gregory (Գրիգոր) the right to stay and preach in Lwów, 1367

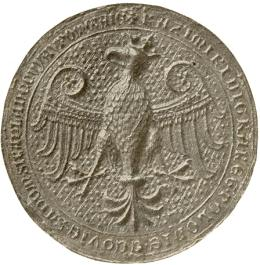
Royal seal, 1334

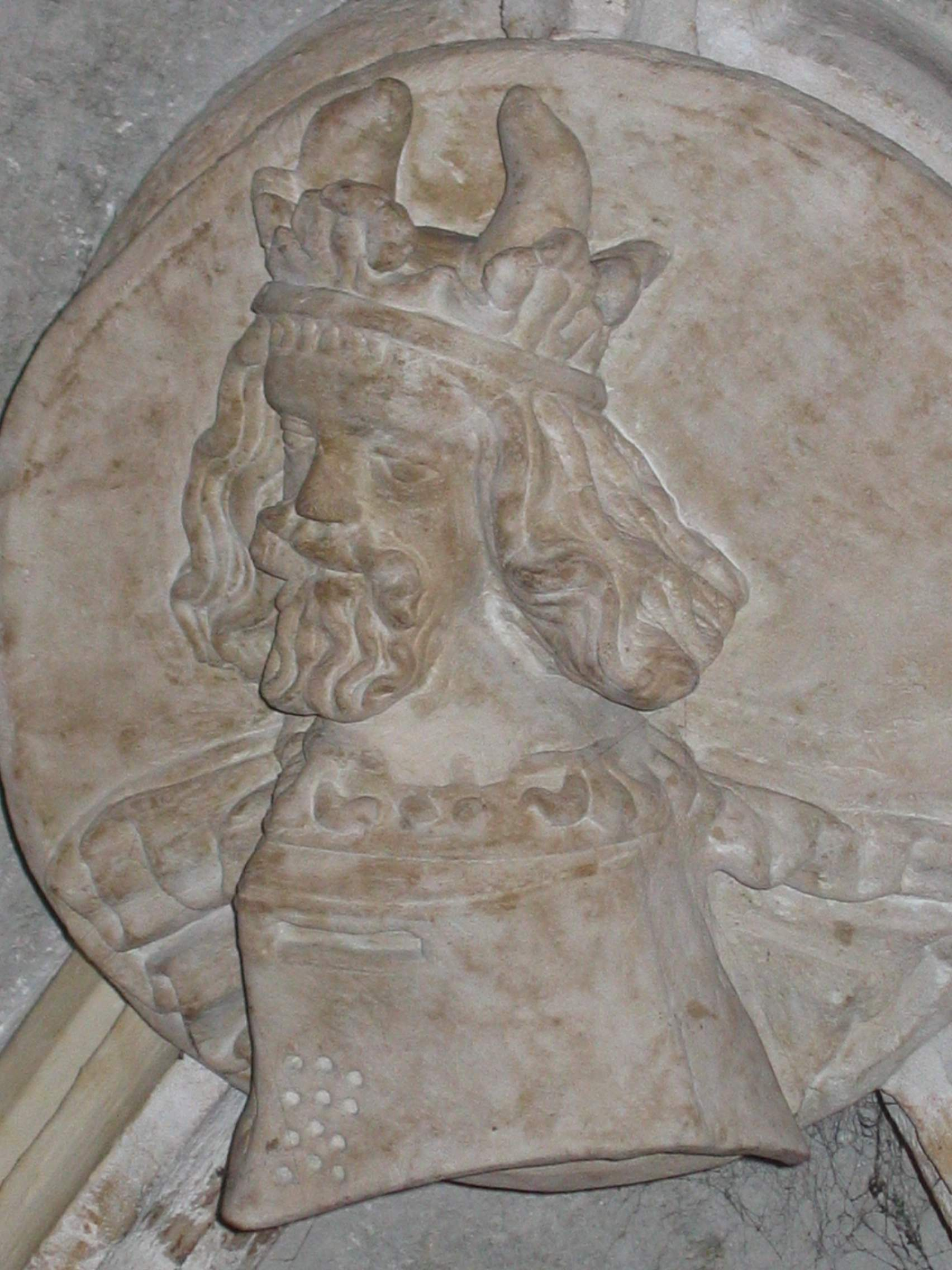
A relief of Casimir the Great on the capstone in the Knight's Hall at the Hetman's House in Kraków

== See also ==
- History of Poland (966–1385)
- Jagiellonian University
- Kazimierz Wielki University in Bydgoszcz
- Congress of Kraków
- Kazimierz
- Kazimierz Dolny
- List of Poles and Poulaines
- Esterka

== Bibliography ==
- Davies, Norman (1982). God's Playground: A History of Poland. Vol. I: The Origins to 1795. Columbia University Press.
- Frost, Robert (2015). The Oxford History of Poland-Lithuania. Vol. I, The Making of the Polish-Lithuanian Union, 1385–1569. Oxford University Press.
- Jasienica, Paweł (1985). Piast Poland. Translated by Jordan, Alexander. American Institute of Polish Culture. ISBN 9780870521348.
- Kurtyka, Janusz (2001). Odrodzone Królestwo. Monarchia Władysława Łokietka i Kazimierza Wielkiego w świetle nowszych badań [The Reborn Kingdom. The Monarchy of Władysław Łokietek and Casimir the Great in the Light of Recent Research] (in Polish). ISBN 83-88385-07-0.
- Lerski, Halina (1996). "Casimir III the Great". Historical Dictionary of Poland, 966-1945. ABC-Clio. pp. 249–250. ISBN 0313034567.
- Rowell, S. C. (1994). Lithuania Ascending: A Pagan Empire within East-Central Europe 1295-1345. Cambridge University Press.
- Szczur, Stanisław (2002). Historia Polski. Średniowiecze. Kraków: Wydawnictwo Literackie. ISBN 978-83-08-03272-5.
- Wyrozumski, Jerzy (1982). Kazimierz Wielki. Ossolineum. ISBN 83-04-01041-0.

Casimir III the Great House of Piast Born: 1310 Died: 1370
Regnal titles
Preceded by Władysław I Łokietek	King of Poland; 1333 – 1370	Succeeded by Louis I of Hungary
Preceded by Yuri II Boleslav	King of Rus'; 1349 – 1370	Succeeded by Louis I of Hungary
