= Elisabeth of Bohemia (1358–1373) =

Duchess of Austria from 1365 to 1373

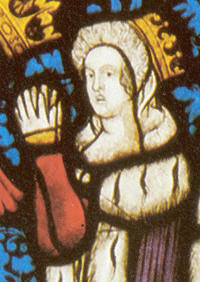
- Born: 1358
- Died: 1373 (aged 14–15)
- Spouse: Albert III, Duke of Austria (m. 1366)
- House: Luxembourg
- Father: Charles IV, Holy Roman Emperor
- Mother: Anne of Świdnica

Elisabeth of Bohemia (1358–1373) also known as Elisabeth of Luxembourg, was the daughter of Charles IV, Holy Roman Emperor, and Anne of Schweidnitz. She was named after her paternal grandmother, Elisabeth of Bohemia (1292–1330).

She had a brother, Wenceslaus, King of the Romans, and two half-sisters, Katharine of Bohemia and Margaret of Bohemia (d. 1349), who were the daughters of Blanche of Valois, Charles IV's previous wife.

After the death of Elisabeth's mother, Charles remarried for the last time to Elizabeth of Pomerania. Elisabeth gained six half-siblings from the marriage: Anna, Queen of England, Sigismund, Holy Roman Emperor, Margaret of Bohemia (d. 1410), John of Görlitz, Charles, and Henry.

Elisabeth married when she was only eight in 1366 to Albert III, Duke of Austria. Elisabeth and Albert had no children and she died aged only fifteen in 1373; she was buried with Albert's parents in Gaming Charterhouse in Lower Austria.

Her husband remarried to Beatrix of Nuremberg and they were parents of Albert IV, Duke of Austria.
