= Anna von Schweidnitz =

Holy Roman Empress from 1355 to 1362

Anna of Świdnica
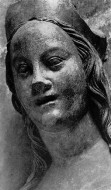

Holy Roman Empress
- Tenure: 1355–1362

Queen consort of Germany and Bohemia
- Tenure: 1353–1362
- Born: c. 1339; Świdnica, Kingdom of Poland
- Died: July 11, 1362 (aged about 23); Prague, Bohemia
- Spouse: Charles IV, Holy Roman Emperor (m. 1353)
- Issue: Wenceslaus, King of the Romans; Elisabeth of Bohemia
- House: Piast
- Father: Henry II of Świdnica
- Mother: Katharina of Hungary

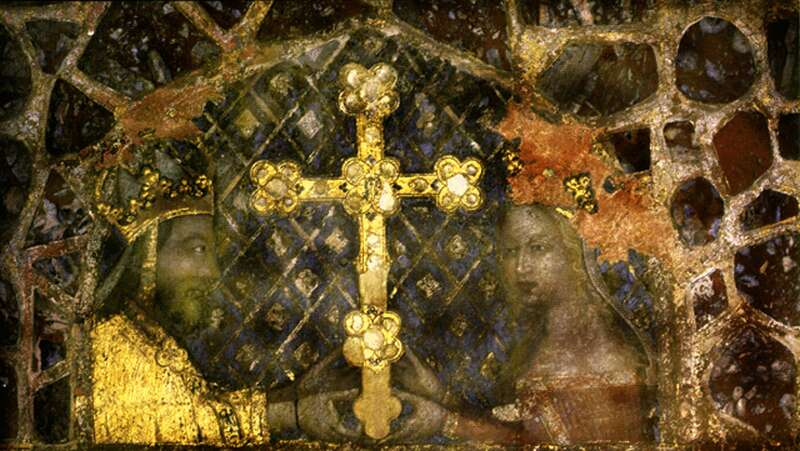
Charles IV and Anna

Anna of Schweidnitz (Świdnica) (also known as Anne or Anna of Świdnica Czech: Anna Svídnická; Polish: Anna Świdnicka; German: Anna von Schweidnitz und Jauer; c. 1339 – 11 July 1362) was Queen of Bohemia, German Queen, and Empress of the Holy Roman Empire. She was the third wife of Emperor Charles IV.

== Biography ==
Anne was the daughter of Polish Duke Henry II of Świdnica-Jawor from the Silesian branch of the Piast dynasty. Her mother was Katherine of Hungary, the daughter of Charles I of Hungary. In his autobiography written in Latin, which covers only his youth prior to marrying Anna, emperor Charles mentions civitatem Swidnitz and dux Swidnicensis, as depicted in the coat of arms room of his Wenzelschloss castle at Lauf an der Pegnitz near Nuremberg.

Anne's father died when she was four years old, and her childless uncle, Bolko II, Duke of Świdnica-Jawor became her guardian. She was brought up and educated by her mother at Visegrád in Hungary. At the age of 11, Anne had been promised to Wenceslaus, newborn son and successor to Charles IV. After the infant Wenceslaus and his mother Anna of the Palatinate died, the now-widowed Emperor asked to marry Anne himself. The planned marriage was part of the strategies devised by Charles and his then-deceased father John to gain control of the Piast Duchies of Silesia as vedlejší země ("neighboring countries") for the Kingdom of Bohemia. Anne's uncle, Louis I of Hungary, the future King of Poland, was able to assist her by renouncing his rights to Świdnica in favor of the House of Luxemburg.

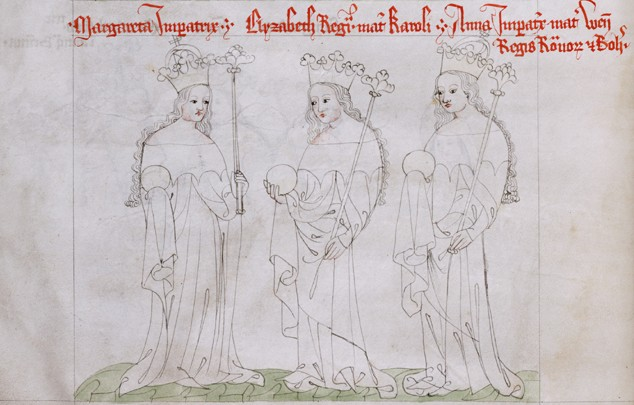
Anna (far right) with her mother-in-law Elisabeth (centre) and Margaret, grandmother of her husband (left)

At the instigation of archbishop Arnošt of Pardubice, Pope Innocent VI issued a dispensation for the marriage, which was required because of the degree of relationship between the bride and groom (they were second cousins once removed through their common ancestors Rudolf I of Germany and Gertrude of Hohenberg). The two were married on 27 May 1353, when Anne was 14; her new husband was 37. The wedding was attended by Anne's guardian Bolko II of Świdnica, Duke Albert II of Austria, King Louis of Hungary, Margrave Louis of Brandenburg, Duke Rudolf of Saxony, an envoy of King Casimir III of Poland, and an envoy of the Republic of Venice.

Modern sarcophagus of the wives of Charles IV in St. Vitus Cathedral in Prague

On 28 July 1353, Anna was crowned Queen of Bohemia in Prague by Archbishop Arnošt of Pardubice. On 9 February 1354, in Aachen, she was crowned German queen. As part of the coronation of Charles as Holy Roman Emperor on 5 April 1355, in the Roman Basilica of Saint Peter, Anne was crowned Empress of the Holy Roman Empire. She was thereby the first Queen of Bohemia to become Empress.

In 1358, Anne bore a daughter, Elisabeth, who was named after Elisabeth of Bohemia (1292–1330). In February 1361 she became mother of the desired successor to the throne, Wenceslaus, who was born in Nuremberg, and baptized on 11 April in the Sebalduskirche by the Archbishops of Prague, Cologne, and Mainz. She did not live to see the coronation of the two-year-old Wenceslaus, however. At age 23, she died in childbirth on 11 July 1362. She is buried in St. Vitus Cathedral. The emperor married Elisabeth of Pomerania one year later. The Duchies of Świdnica and Jawor passed to Bohemia after Bolko's death in 1368.

== Ancestry ==
Ancestors of Anna von Schweidnitz

8. Bolko I the Strict
4. Bernard of Świdnica
9. Beatrice of Brandenburg
2. Henry II, Duke of Świdnica
10. Władysław I Łokietek
5. Kunigunde of Poland
11. Jadwiga of Kalisz
1. Anna von Schweidnitz, Holy Roman Empress
12. Charles Martel of Anjou
6. Charles I of Hungary
13. Clemence of Austria
3. Katherine of Hungary

== Literature ==
- Thilo Vogelsang (1953). "Anna von Schweidnitz und Jauer". Neue Deutsche Biographie (in German). Vol. 1. Berlin: Duncker & Humblot. pp. 299–299.
- Andreas Rüther: Anna von Schweidnitz und Jauer. In: Schlesische Lebensbilder, Bd. VIII, ISBN 3-7686-3501-5 (in German)
- Peter Moraw: Anna von Schweidnitz und Jauer. In: Lexikon des Mittelalters, Bd. I, München 1980, Sp. 655 (in German)
- F. Machilek: Anna von Schweidnitz. In: Schweidnitz im Wandel der Zeiten, Würzburg 1990, S. 317-322 (in German)

Royal titles
Preceded by Anna of Bavaria	Queen consort of Germany; 1353–1362	Succeeded by Elisabeth of Pomerania
Preceded by Anna of Bavaria	Queen consort of Bohemia; 1353–1362	Succeeded by Elisabeth of Pomerania
Preceded by Margaret II of Hainaut	Holy Roman Empress; 1355–1362	Succeeded by Elisabeth of Pomerania
