= Bohemian Palatinate =

Territory of the Bohemian Crown (1353–1401)

Bohemian Palatinate Česká Falc Böhmische Oberpfalz
- Incorporated territory of the Crown of Bohemia
- 1353–1401
- Left: Coat of arms of the Bohemian Palatinate (Sulzbach-Rosenberg); Right: Lesser royal arms of the kings of Bohemia

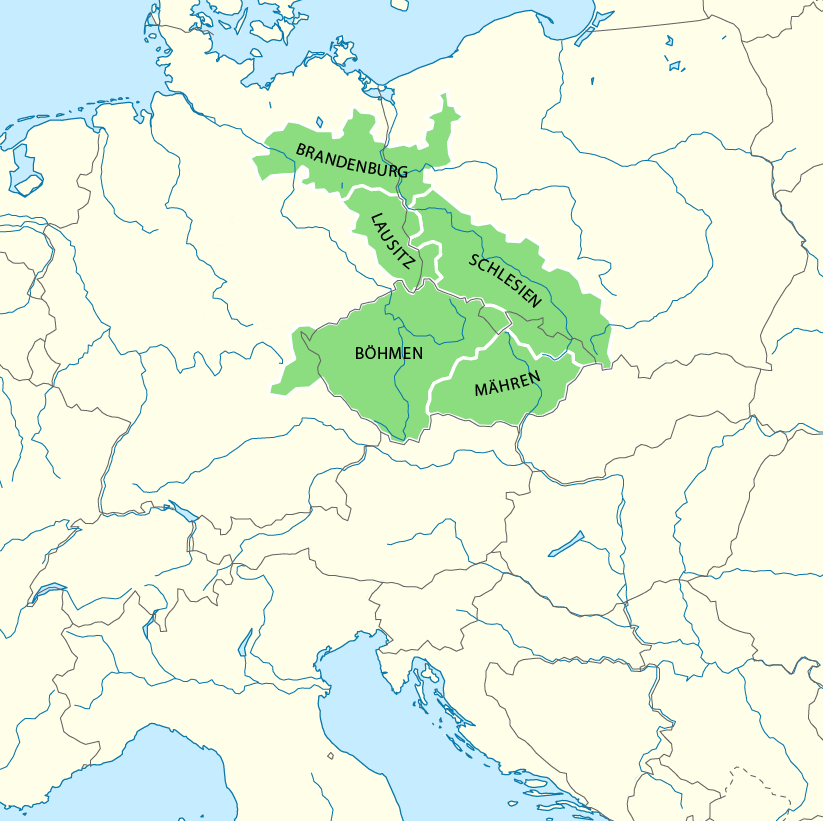
- The Bohemian Crown lands under Charles IV, Holy Roman Emperor. Bohemian Palatinate can be seen in the lower left, adjacent to Bohemia
- Capital: Sulzbach (1353–1373); Auerbach (1373–1400)
- Historical era: Medieval Europe
  - Established: 1353
  - Golden Bull: 1356
  - Disestablished: 1401
Preceded by	Succeeded by
Upper Palatinate (Electoral Palatinate)	Upper Palatinate (Electoral Palatinate)
- Today part of: Germany

The Bohemian Palatinate (Czech: Česká Falc) or Bohemian Upper Palatinate (German: Böhmische Oberpfalz), since the 19th century also called New Bohemia (Czech: Nové Čechy, German: Neuböhmen), is a historical area in the northeast of present-day Bavaria (Germany), which from 1353 onwards was incorporated into the Crown of Bohemia by Emperor Charles IV. The Bohemian Palatinate lay in the north of the Upper Palatinate, its territory stretching up to Upper and Middle Franconia close to the Free Imperial City of Nuremberg.

== History ==
In 1322, Emperor Louis IV had pawned the Egerland region to King John of Bohemia of the House of Luxembourg. John's son, Charles IV, who also succeeded Louis as Emperor, rivalled with the houses of Habsburg and Wittelsbach and aimed to expand his hereditary lands to win influence over the Imperial Princes. Charles obtained the approval of the Prince-electors to affiliate the Imperial City of Eger (Cheb) with the Kingdom of Bohemia. In 1349, he married Anne of Bavaria, daughter of the Wittelsbach Count Palatine of the Rhine Rudolf II, who held the adjacent lands in the Bavarian Nordgau (the later "Upper Palatinate" region). However, Charles had to abandon his hope to be heir to his father-in-law's estates upon Anna's early death in 1353.

In 1353, Charles gained 24 estates in the Upper Palatinate from Rupert I in compensation for his debts. To these, he joined other territories, and the whole region was incorporated into the Crown of Bohemia in 1355. The administrative center of this area was in Sulzbach-Rosenberg, while for representational purposes, Charles built the Lauf Castle. The Emperor intensively supported the area through tax reliefs for craftsmen and traders, as well as other privileges for settlements and markets.

In 1373, Charles ceded the greater part of the area back to the Wittelsbachs in exchange for the Electorate of Brandenburg. Wenceslaus IV lost the rest in 1401.

== Gallery ==
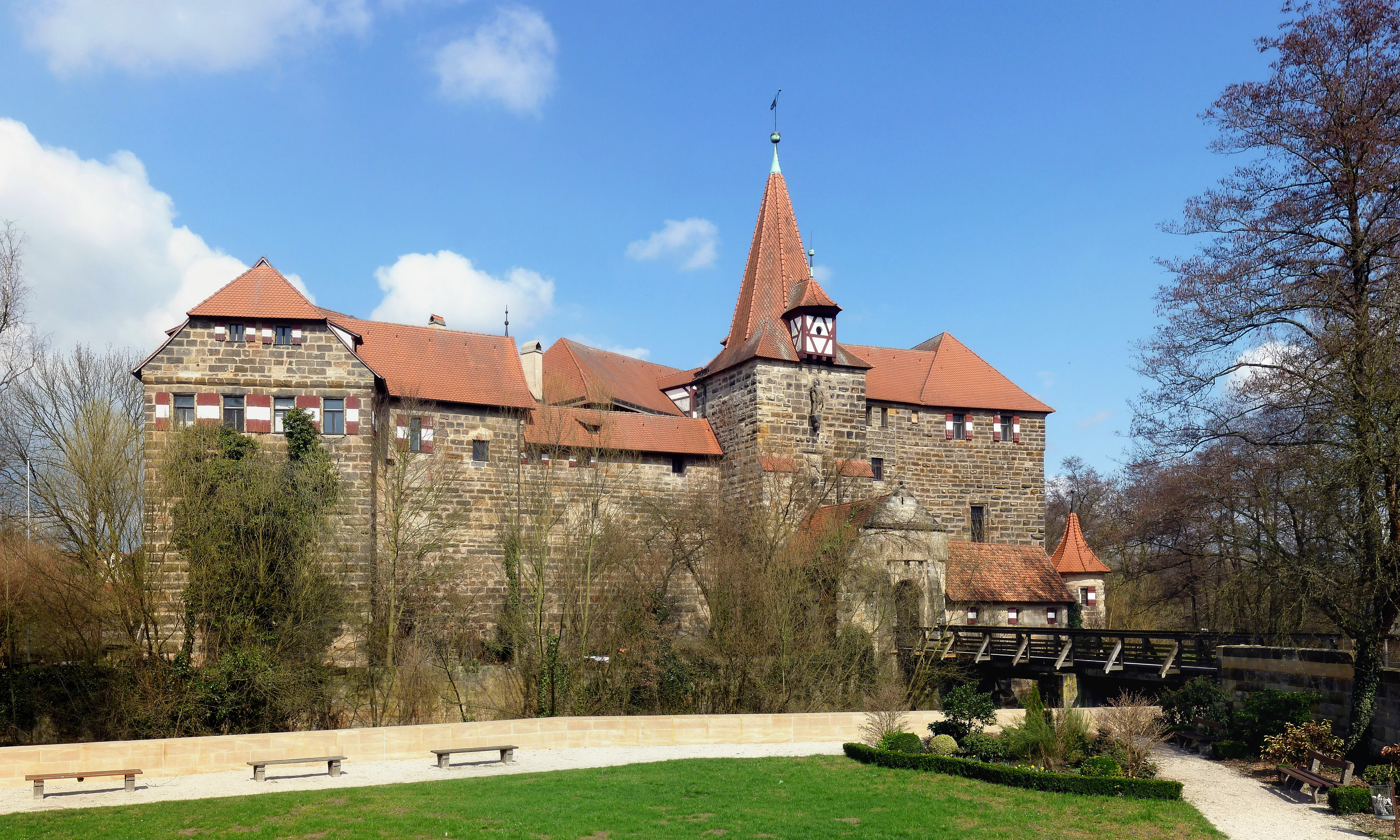
Lauf Castle

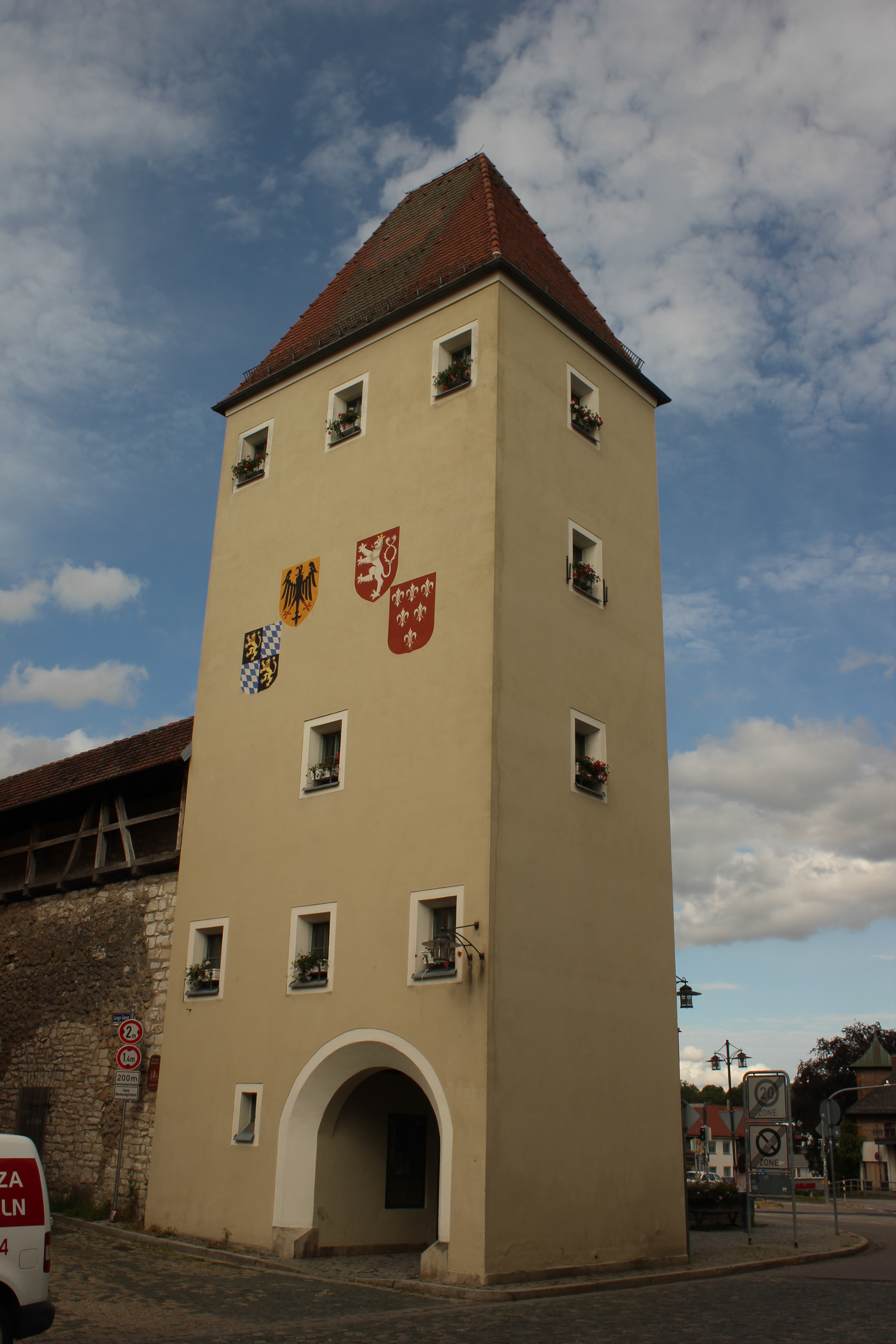
Tower in Sulzbach-Rosenberg with the Czech coat of arms

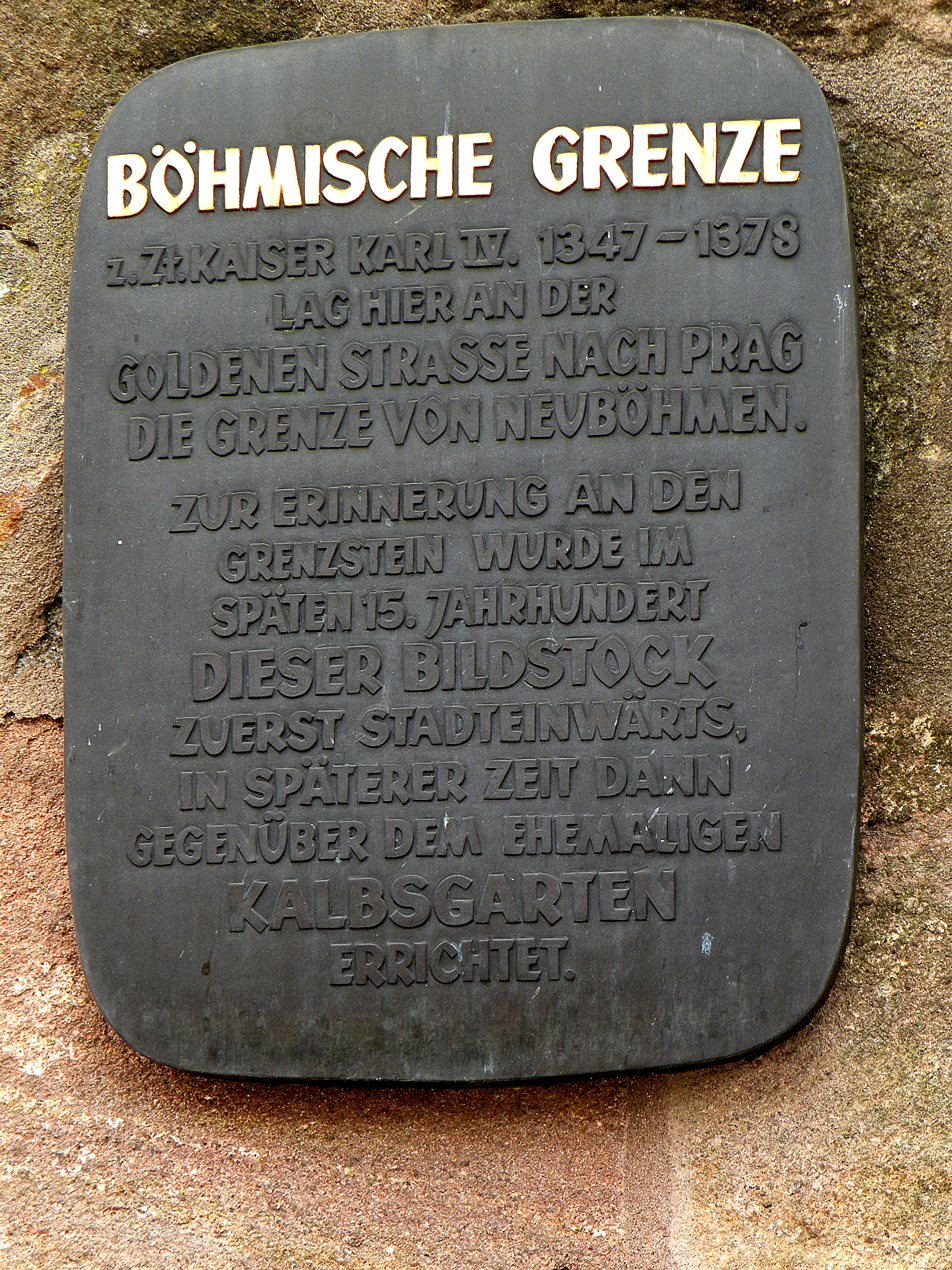
Plaque commemorating the former Czech border in Nuremberg

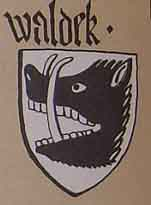
Coat of arms of the Zajíc noble family in the Lauf Castle

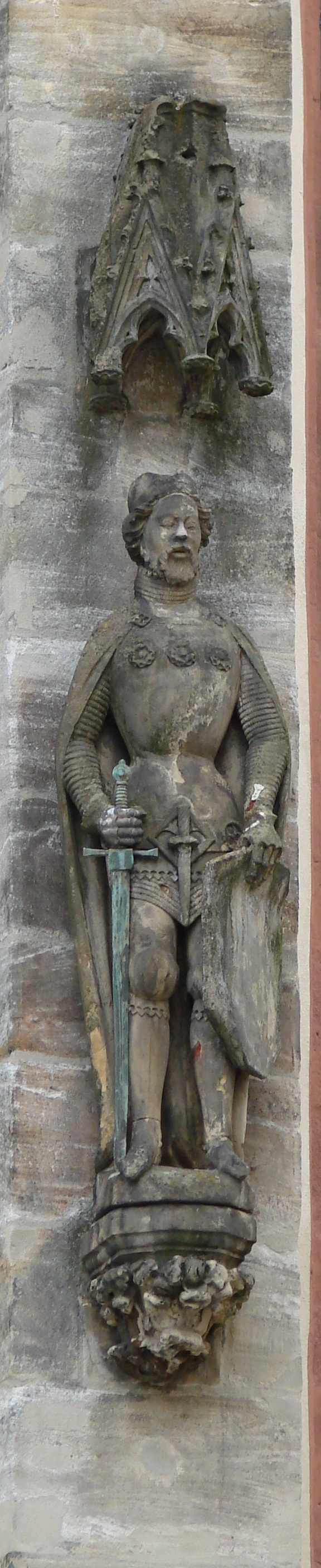
Statue of Charles IV at the St. Mary Church in Sulzbach-Rosenberg
