= Margaret of Bohemia, Burgravine of Nuremberg =

Burgravine of Nuremberg (1373–1410)

Margaret of Bohemia (29 September 1373 – 4 June 1410) was the younger daughter of Holy Roman Emperor Charles IV and his fourth wife Elizabeth of Pomerania. She became Burgravine of Nuremberg through marriage.

== Biography ==
Margaret was born in 1373. Her father was Charles IV, Holy Roman Emperor, eldest son of John of Bohemia, King of Bohemia and Count of Luxembourg and Elizabeth of Bohemia who was the daughter of Wenceslaus II of Bohemia and Judith of Habsburg. Her mother was Elizabeth of Pomerania, daughter of Bogislaw V, Duke of Pomerania and Elisabeth of Poland who was the daughter of King Casimir III of Poland.

Her full siblings included Anne of Bohemia, Queen of England, Sigismund of Bohemia, Holy Roman Emperor and John of Bohemia, Margrave of Moravia, among others. Her half-siblings from her fathers three earlier marriages included Margaret of Bohemia, Queen of Hungary, among others.

In 1381, she married John III, Burgrave of Nuremberg, who she had been betrothed to since infancy.

The marriage only produced one child:

- Elizabeth of Nuremberg (1391–1429), who married Eberhard III, Count of Württemberg, and had issue.

Margaret died in 1410, aged thirty-six, and her husband died ten years later in 1420; he did not remarry after Margaret's premature death. She was praised during her lifetime by German chroniclers.

Her daughter Elizabeth gave birth to a granddaughter, also called Elizabeth. The younger Elizabeth was engaged to Albert III, Duke of Bavaria, but instead married John III of Werdenberg.

Margaret of Bohemia, Burgravine of Nuremberg House of Luxembourg Born: 19 September 1373 Died: 4 June 1410
German nobility
Vacant Title last held by Elisabeth of Meissen	Burgravine of Nuremberg; 1397 – 4 June 1410	Succeeded by Elisabeth of Bavaria
New title Division of inheritance from Frederick V	Margravine of Brandenburg-Kulmbach; 21 January 1398 – 4 June 1410	Vacant Title next held by Elisabeth of Bavaria
