= List of German queens =

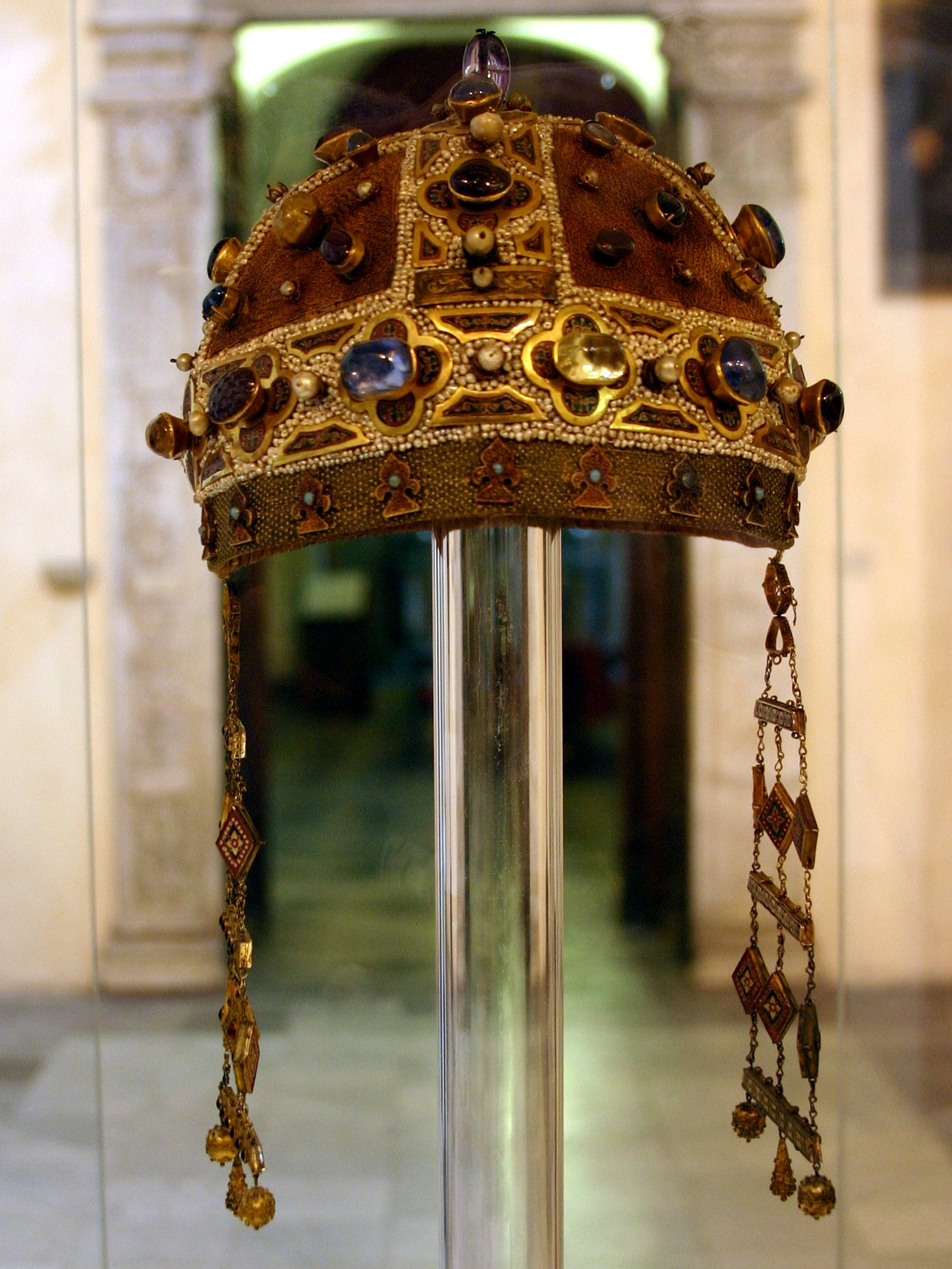
Crown of Constance of Aragon, Holy Roman Empress and Queen of the Romans

Queen of the Romans (Latin: Regina Romanorum, German: Königin der Römer) or Queen of the Germans were the official titles of the queens consort of the medieval and early modern Kingdom of Germany. They were the wives of the King of the Romans (chosen by imperial election), and are informally also known as German queen (German: Deutsche Königin). A Queen of the Romans also became Holy Roman Empress if her husband was crowned Holy Roman Emperor, in the Middle Ages usually by the Pope in Rome during an Italienzug. Most elected Kings of the Romans did, but some never made it that far, and thus their wives only ever achieved the status of Queen of the Romans.

Empress Maria Theresa (1745–1780) is often considered to be a ruler in her own right, as she was Queen regnant of Bohemia and Hungary, and although her husband Francis I was crowned Holy Roman Emperor in 1745, it was she who ruled the Empire and continued to do so even after Francis' death in 1765 before ruling jointly with her son Emperor Joseph II.

== German (East Francian) Queens ==
With the Treaty of Verdun in 843, the Carolingian Empire was divided. Lothair, the King of the middle Kingdom of Lotharingia or Burgundy, obtained the title of Emperor; Louis obtained Eastern Francia, the area which would become Germany. The wives of that realm's Kings are thus German Queens (or more precisely, East Francian Queens – 'Germany' is historically deemed to have developed with the election of Henry the Fowler), but not always Empresses.

=== Carolingian ===
Picture	Name	House	Birth	Marriage	Became Queen	Became Empress	Ceased to be Consort	Death	Spouse
	Emma of Altdorf; Queen of the East Franks	Elder Welf	808	827	11 August 843	never Empress	31 January 876		Louis I/II
	Liutgard; Queen of the East Franks	Liudolfing	c. 845	29 November 874	26 August 876	never Empress	20 January 882	17/30 November 885	Louis II/III
	Richardis	Ahalolfinger	c.840	862	20 January 882	12 February 881	As Queen: 11 November 887 husband's deposition as King; As Empress: 13 January 888 husband's death	18 September 894-896	Charles the Fat
	Ota	Conradine	c. 874	888		22 February 896	8 December 899	30 November 903	Arnulf
Picture	Name	House	Birth	Marriage	Became Queen	Became Empress	Ceased to be Consort	Death	Spouse

=== Conradine ===
Picture	Name	House	Birth	Marriage	Became Queen	Became Empress	Ceased to be Consort	Death	Spouse
	Cunigunde of Swabia; Queen of East Francia	Ahalolfings	c.870	913		never Empress	23 December 918	7 February after 918	Conrad I
Picture	Name	House	Birth	Marriage	Became Queen	Became Empress	Ceased to be Consort	Death	Spouse

== German Queens ==
With the elevation of Otto I of Germany in 962 to the Imperial title, the title 'Roman King/Emperor' became inaliably associated with the Kingdom of Germany – although a King of Germany might not bear the Imperial title, it would eventually become impossible to conceive of a Holy Roman Emperor not being King of Germany (a viewpoint reinforced with the equation of King of the Romans with King of Germany from the 12th century). Thus, the following women, though not all Holy Roman Empresses, were all Queens of Germany, and – from the inception of the Hohenstaufen dynasty – all Queens of the Romans.

=== Ottonian Dynasty ===
Picture	Name	Father	Birth	Marriage	Became Queen	Became Empress	Ceased to be Consort	Death	Spouse
	Matilda; Queen of the East Franks	Dietrich, Count of Westphalia (Immedinger)	c.895	909	23 April 919	never Empress	2 July 936	14 March 968	Henry I
	Edith of Wessex; Queen of the East Franks	Edward the Elder (Wessex)	910	929	7 August 936	never Empress	26 January 946		Otto I
	Adelaide of Italy	Rudolph II of Burgundy (Welf)	931	951		2 February 962 (Crowned on this date)	7 May 973	16 December 999	Otto I
	Theophanu of Byzantium	Konstantinos Skleros (Skleros)	960	14 April 972		14 April 972 husband as co-Emperor with his father/ 7 May 973 husband as sole Emperor; Crowned 14 April 972	7 December 983 husband's death	15 June 991	Otto II
	Cunigunde of Luxembourg	Siegfried, Count of Luxemburg (Ardenne–Luxembourg)	c.975	c.1000	17 June 1002	26 April 1014	13 July 1024	3 March 1033	Henry II
Picture	Name	Father	Birth	Marriage	Became Queen	Became Empress	Ceased to be Consort	Death	Spouse

=== Salian Dynasty ===
Picture	Name	Father	Birth	Marriage	Became Queen	Became Empress	Ceased to be Consort	Death	Spouse
	Gisela of Swabia	Herman II, Duke of Swabia (Conradines)	11 November 995	1016	8 September 1024	26 March 1027	4 June 1039 husband's death	14 February 1043	Conrad II
	Gunhilda Knutsdatter of Denmark; Queen of the Germans	Cnut the Great (Denmark)	c.1020	1036		never Empress	1038		Henry III
	Agnes de Poitou	William V, Duke of Aquitaine (Ramnulfids)	1025	21 November 1043		25 December 1046	5 October 1056	14 December 1077	Henry III
Bertha of Savoy, the Holy Roman Empress	Bertha of Savoy	Otto, Count of Savoy (Savoy)	21 September 1051	13 July 1066		21 March 1084	27 December 1087		Henry IV
Eupraxia-Adelaide of Kiev	Eupraxia of Kiev (Adelaide)	Vsevolod I, Grand Prince of Kiev (Rurikids)	1071	14 August 1089		14 August 1089	31 December 1105 husband's deposition	20 July 1109	Henry IV
	Constanze; Queen of the Romans	Roger I of Sicily (Hauteville)	1077–1087	1095		never Empress	1098 husband's deposition	27 November 1198	Conrad, King of the Romans
	Matilda of England	Henry I of England (Normandy)	7 February 1101	7 January 1114			23 May 1125	10 September 1167	Henry V
Picture	Name	Father	Birth	Marriage	Became Queen	Became Empress	Ceased to be Consort	Death	Spouse

=== House of Supplinburg ===
Picture	Name	Father	Birth	Marriage	Became Queen	Became Empress	Ceased to be Consort	Death	Spouse
	Richenza of Northeim	Henry the Fat, Margrave of Frisia	c.1087–89	c.1100	30 August 1125	4 June 1133	4 December 1137	10 June 1141	Lothair III
Picture	Name	Father	Birth	Marriage	Became Queen	Became Empress	Ceased to be Consort	Death	Spouse

=== House of Hohenstaufen (1) ===
Picture	Name	Father	Birth	Marriage	Became Queen	Became Empress	Ceased to be Consort	Death	Spouse
	Gertrud von Komburg; Queen of the Romans in opposition	Henry, Count of Rothenburg		c.1115	1127 husband King in opposition	never Empress	c.1130-1131		Conrad III
	Gertrude of Sulzbach	Berengar II, Count of Sulzbach		1136	7 March 1138	never Empress	14 April 1146		Conrad III
	Adelheid of Vohburg	Diepold III, Margrave of Vohburg	c.1128	1147	4 March 1152	never Empress	March 1153 marriage annulled	after 1187	Frederick I
	Beatrice I, Countess of Burgundy	Renaud III, Count of Burgundy	1148	9 June 1156			15 November 1184		Frederick I
	Constance of Sicily	Roger II, King of Sicily (Hauteville)	1154	27 January 1186		14 April 1191	28 September 1197	27 November 1198	Henry VI
	Irene Angelina	Isaac II Angelos, Byzantine Emperor	1177–1181	25 May 1197	6 March 1198	never Empress	21 August 1208	27 August 1208	Philip of Swabia
Picture	Name	Father	Birth	Marriage	Became Queen	Became Empress	Ceased to be Consort	Death	Spouse

=== House of Welf ===
Picture	Name	Father	Birth	Marriage	Became Queen	Became Empress	Ceased to be Consort	Death	Spouse
	Beatrice of Swabia	Philip, King of Germany (Hohenstaufen)	1198	1209 or 1212			1212		Otto IV
Picture	Name	Father	Birth	Marriage	Became Queen	Became Empress	Ceased to be Consort	Death	Spouse

=== House of Hohenstaufen (2) ===
Picture	Name	Father	Birth	Marriage	Became Queen	Became Empress	Ceased to be Consort	Death	Spouse
	Constance of Aragon	Alfonso II, King of Aragon	1179	5 August 1209	1211–1212 husband as King in opposition/ 5 July 1215 husband unopposed	22 November 1220	23 April 1220; Ceased to be Queen: son elected as King; 23 June 1222; Ceased to be Empress upon death		Frederick II
	Isabelle of Brienne	John of Brienne, King of Jerusalem	1212	9 November 1225			25 April 1228		Frederick II
	Isabella of England	John, King of England	1214	15/20 July 1235			1 December 1241		Frederick II
	Bianca Lancia	a child of Manfred I Lancia (one of his sons, Manfred II or Bonifacio, or one daughter, Bianca)	c.1200	c.1244? Evidence for marriage is dubious	never German Queen	c.1244? evidence for marriage is dubious		c.1244	Frederick II
	Margaret of Austria; Queen of the Romans	Leopold VI of Babenberg, Duke of Austria	c.1204	29 November 1225; Queen by marriage: husband was King under his father, Frederick II; 23 March 1227; Crowned as Queen		never Empress	4 July 1235 husband dethroned; 12 February 1242 husband's death	29 October 1266	Henry, King of the Romans
	Elisabeth of Bavaria; Queen of the Romans	Otto II Wittelsbach, Duke of Bavaria	1227	1 September 1246		never Empress	21 May 1254	9 October 1273	Conrad IV
Picture	Name	House	Father	Marriage	Became Queen	Became Empress	Ceased to be Consort	Death	Spouse

=== House of Habsburg (1) ===
Picture	Name	Father	Birth	Marriage	Became Queen	Became Empress	Ceased to be Consort	Death	Spouse
	Gertrude of Hohenberg; Queen of the Romans	Burchard V, Count of Hohenburg	1225	1245	29 September 1273	never Empress	16 February 1281		Rudolph I
	Isabelle of Burgundy; Queen of the Romans	Hugh IV, Duke of Burgundy	c.1270	6 February 1284		never Empress	15 July 1291 husband's death	c.1323	Rudolph I
Picture	Name	Father	Birth	Marriage	Became Queen	Became Empress	Ceased to be Consort	Death	Spouse

=== House of Nassau ===
Picture	Name	Father	Birth	Marriage	Became Queen	Became Empress	Ceased to be Consort	Death	Spouse
	Imagina of Isenburg-Limburg	Gerlach IV of Isenburg-Limburg (Isenburg-Limburg)	1259	1271	5 May 1292	never Empress	23 June 1298	29 September 1313	Adolf of Nassau-Weilburg
Picture	Name	Father	Birth	Marriage	Became Queen	Became Empress	Ceased to be Consort	Death	Spouse

=== House of Habsburg (2) ===
Picture	Name	Father	Birth	Marriage	Became Queen	Became Empress	Ceased to be Consort	Death	Spouse
	Elisabeth of Tirol; Queen of the Romans	Meinhard, Duke of Carinthia	c.1262	20 December 1274	27 July 1298	never Empress	1 May 1308	28 October 1312	Albert I
Picture	Name	Father	Birth	Marriage	Became Queen	Became Empress	Ceased to be Consort	Death	Spouse

=== House of Luxemburg (1) ===
Picture	Name	Father	Birth	Marriage	Became Queen	Became Empress	Ceased to be Consort	Death	Spouse
	Margaret of Brabant; Queen of the Romans	John I, Duke of Brabant	4 October 1276	9 July 1292	27 November 1308	never Empress	14 December 1311		Henry VII
Picture	Name	Father	Birth	Marriage	Became Queen	Became Empress	Ceased to be Consort	Death	Spouse

=== House of Habsburg (3) ===
Picture	Name	Father	Birth	Marriage	Became Queen	Became Empress	Ceased to be Consort	Death	Spouse
	Isabella of Aragon; Queen of the Romans	James II of Barcelona, King of Aragon and Sicily	1296	11 May 1314	19 October 1315 husband's election (in opposition)/ 5 September 1325 husband recognised as co-King	never Empress	28 September 1322 husband abandons claim/ 13 January 1330 husband's death	12 July 1330	Frederick the Handsome
Picture	Name	Father	Birth	Marriage	Became Queen	Became Empress	Ceased to be Consort	Death	Spouse

=== House of Wittelsbach (1) ===
Picture	Name	Father	Birth	Marriage	Became Queen	Became Empress	Ceased to be Consort	Death	Spouse
	Beatrix of Świdnica; Queen of the Romans	Bolko I, Duke of Świdnica	1290	1308	20 October 1314 husband's election	never Empress	24 August 1322		Louis IV
	Margaret, Countess of Hainaut	William of Avesnes, Count of Hainaut	1311	26 February 1324		January 1328	11 October 1347	23 June 1356	Louis IV
Picture	Name	Father	Birth	Marriage	Became Queen	Became Empress	Ceased to be Consort	Death	Spouse

=== House of Luxemburg (2) ===
Picture	Name	Father	Birth	Marriage	Became Queen	Became Empress	Ceased to be Consort	Death	Spouse
	Blanche of Valois; Queen of the Romans	Charles of Valois	1316	May 1329	11 July 1346 husband's election (in opposition)	never Empress	1 August 1348		Charles IV, Holy Roman Emperor
	Anna of Bavaria; Queen of the Romans	Rudolf II, Duke of Bavaria (Wittelsbach)	26 September 1329	4 March 1349	17 June 1349 husband's election (without opposition)	never Empress	2 February 1353		Charles IV, Holy Roman Emperor
	Anna of Świdnica	Henry II, Duke of Świdnica	c. 1339	27 May 1353		5 April 1355 coronation with husband	11 July 1362		Charles IV, Holy Roman Emperor
	Elizabeth of Pomerania	Bogislav V, Duke of Pomerania	1347	21 May 1363		1 November 1368 coronation	29 November 1378 husband's death	14 February 1393	Charles IV, Holy Roman Emperor
	Johanna of Bavaria; Queen of the Romans	Albert I, Duke of Bavaria (Wittelsbach)	c. 1362	29 September 1370	10 June 1376	never Empress	31 December 1386		Wenceslaus, King of the Romans
	Sofia of Bavaria; Queen of the Romans	John II, Duke of Bavaria (Wittelsbach)	1376	2 May 1389		never Empress	20 August 1400 husband's deposition	26 September 1425	Wenceslaus, King of the Romans
Picture	Name	Father	Birth	Marriage	Became Queen	Became Empress	Ceased to be Consort	Death	Spouse

=== House of Wittelsbach (2) ===
Picture	Name	Father	Birth	Marriage	Became Queen	Became Empress	Ceased to be Consort	Death	Spouse
	Elisabeth of Nuremberg; Queen of the Romans	Frederick V, Burgrave of Nuremberg (Hohenzollern)	1358	27 June 1374	21 August 1400 husband's election	never Empress	18 May 1410 husband's death	26 July 1411	Rupert of Germany
Picture	Name	Father	Birth	Marriage	Became Queen	Became Empress	Ceased to be Consort	Death	Spouse

=== House of Luxemburg (3) ===
Picture	Name	Father	Birth	Marriage	Became Queen	Became Empress	Ceased to be Consort	Death	Spouse
	Barbara of Celje	Hermann II (Celje)	1390 to 1395	1408	21 July 1411 husband's election	31 May 1433 husband's coronation	9 December 1437 husband's death	11 July 1451	Sigismund, Holy Roman Emperor
Picture	Name	Father	Birth	Marriage	Became Queen	Became Empress	Ceased to be Consort	Death	Spouse

=== House of Habsburg (4) ===
Picture	Name	Father	Birth	Marriage	Became Queen	Became Empress	Ceased to be Consort	Death	Spouse
	Elizabeth of Luxembourg; Queen of the Romans	Emperor Sigismund (Luxemburg)	1409	1422	18 March 1438 husband's election	never Empress	27 October 1439 husband's death	25 December 1442	Albert II of Germany
	Eleanor of Portugal	Edward of Portugal (Aviz)	18 September 1434	16 March 1452		19 March 1452 husband's coronation	3 September 1467		Frederick III, Holy Roman Emperor
	Bianca Maria of Milan	Galeazzo Maria, Duke of Milan (Sforza)	5 April 1472	16 March 1494		4 February 1508 husband declared "emperor-elect"	31 December 1510		Maximilian I, Holy Roman Emperor
	Isabella of Portugal	Manuel I of Portugal (Aviz)	23 October 1503	10 March 1526		24 February 1530 husband's coronation	1 May 1539		Charles V, Holy Roman Emperor
	Anna of Bohemia and Hungary; Queen of the Romans	Vladislaus II of Bohemia and Hungary (Jagiello)	23 July 1503	25 May 1521	January 1531 husband's election	never Empress	27 January 1547		Ferdinand I, Holy Roman Emperor
	Maria of Spain	Emperor Charles V (Habsburg)	21 June 1528	13 September 1548	November 1562 husband's election	25 July 1564 husband's ascension	12 October 1576 husband's death	26 February 1603	Maximilian II, Holy Roman Emperor
	Anna of Austria	Ferdinand II, Archduke of Austria (Habsburg)	4 October 1585	4 December 1611	1612 husband's election		14 December 1618		Matthias, Holy Roman Emperor
	Eleonore of Mantua	Vincenzo I, Duke of Mantua (Gonzaga)	23 September (23 February?) 1598	4 February 1622			15 February 1637 husband's death	27 June 1655	Ferdinand II, Holy Roman Emperor
	Maria Anna of Spain	Philip III of Spain (Habsburg)	18 August 1606	20 February 1631	22 December 1636 husband's election	15 February 1637 husband's ascension	13 May 1646		Ferdinand III, Holy Roman Emperor
	Maria Leopoldine of Austria	Leopold V, Archduke of Austria (Habsburg)	6 April 1632	2 July 1648			7 August 1649		Ferdinand III, Holy Roman Emperor
	Eleanor of Mantua	Charles II, Duke of Mantua (Gonzaga)	18 November 1630	30 April 1651			2 April 1657 husband's death	6 December 1686	Ferdinand III, Holy Roman Emperor
	Margaret Theresa of Spain	Philip IV of Spain (Habsburg)	12 July 1651	12 December 1666			12 March 1673		Leopold I, Holy Roman Emperor
	Claudia Felicitas of Austria	Ferdinand Charles, Archduke of Austria (Habsburg)	30 May 1653	15 October 1673			8 April 1676		Leopold I, Holy Roman Emperor
	Eleonore-Magdalena of Neuburg	Philip William, Elector Palatine (Wittelsbach)	6 January 1655	14 December 1676			5 May 1705 husband's death	19 January 1720	Leopold I, Holy Roman Emperor
	Wilhelmina Amalia of Brunswick	John Frederick, Duke of Calenburg (Welf)	21 April 1673	24 February 1699		5 May 1705 husband's ascension	17 April 1711 husband's death	10 April 1742	Joseph I, Holy Roman Emperor
	Elisabeth Christine of Brunswick-Wolfenbüttel	Louis Rudolph, Duke of Brunswick-Wolfenbüttel (Welf)	28 August (28 September?) 1691	1 August 1708	December 1711 husband's election		20 October 1740 husband's death	21 December 1750	Charles VI, Holy Roman Emperor
Picture	Name	Father	Birth	Marriage	Became Queen	Became Empress	Ceased to be Consort	Death	Spouse

=== House of Wittelsbach (3) ===
Picture	Name	Father	Birth	Marriage	Became Queen	Became Empress	Ceased to be Consort	Death	Spouse
	Maria Amalia of Austria	Joseph I (Habsburg)	22 October 1701	5 October 1723	24 January 1742 husband's election		20 January 1745 husband's death	11 December 1756	Charles VII, Holy Roman Emperor
Picture	Name	Father	Birth	Marriage	Became Queen	Became Empress	Ceased to be Consort	Death	Spouse

=== House of Habsburg-Lorraine ===
Picture	Name	Father	Birth	Marriage	Became Queen	Became Empress	Ceased to be Consort	Death	Spouse
	Maria Theresa	Charles VI (Habsburg)	13 May 1717	12 February 1736	13 September 1745 husband's election		18 August 1765 husband's death	29 November 1780	Francis I, Holy Roman Emperor
	Maria Josepha of Bavaria	Charles VII (Wittelsbach)	30 March 1739	23 January 1765		18 August 1765 husband's ascension	28 May 1767		Joseph II, Holy Roman Emperor
	Maria Luisa of Spain	Charles III of Spain (Bourbon)	24 November 1745	5 August 1765	30 September 1790 husband's election		1 March 1792 husband's death	15 May 1792	Leopold II, Holy Roman Emperor
	Maria Teresa of the Two Sicilies	Ferdinand I of the Two Sicilies (Bourbon)	6 June 1772	15 August 1790	5 July 1792 husband's election		6 August 1806 husband's abdication	13 April 1807	Francis II, Holy Roman Emperor
Picture	Name	Father	Birth	Marriage	Became Queen	Became Empress	Ceased to be Consort	Death	Spouse

== Consorts of disputed Kings ==
In addition to the above, the following women were the wives of men who made claim to the Kingship of Germany, but who are not recognised as official Kings:

- Adelheid of Savoy (d.1080). She was the wife of Rudolf of Rheinfeld, anti-King between 1077 and 1080.
- Beatrice of Brabant (1225 – 11 November 1288). On 10 March 1241, she became the second wife of Henry Raspe, anti-King between 1246 and 1247.
- Elisabeth of Brunswick-Lüneburg (d.1266). She was the wife of William II of Holland, who was elected as an anti-King of Germany in 1247. He was crowned King of the Romans at Aachen in 1248, and married Elizabeth in 1252.
- Sanchia of Provence (1225–1261) and Beatrice of Falkenburg (d.1277). They were the second and third (m.1269) wives respectively of Richard of Cornwall, who was elected King of Germany and of the Romans in 1257, in the hope that he would reestablish order in Germany. He was crowned King of the Romans by the Pope at Aachen in 1257; with him was crowned Sanchia.
- Violant of Aragon (1236–1301). She was the wife of Alfonso X of Castile, who claimed and was elected as anti-King to the German throne in 1257 as a grandson of Philip of Swabia. Alfonso never visited Germany, held no authority there, and relinquished his claims in 1275.
- Elisabeth von Hohnstein (died c. 4 April 1380). She was the wife of Günther von Schwarzburg, who was elected King of Germany and of the Romans in place of Louis IV on 30 January 1348, but who was forced to resign his claims by Charles IV on 24 May 1349.

== See also ==
- List of Holy Roman Empresses
- List of German monarchs
