= Catherine of Hungary, Duchess of Świdnica =

Catherine of Hungary

Duchess of Świdnica
- Tenure: 1338–1343 or 1345
- Died: 1355
- Spouse: Henry II of Świdnica
- Issue: Anna, Holy Roman Empress
- House: Anjou
- Father: Charles I of Hungary
- Mother: Maria of Bytom or Elisabeth of Poland

Catherine of Hungary (died 1355) was a daughter of King Charles I of Hungary. Her mother is uncertain. She was a member of the House of Anjou and was a Hungarian princess.

== Family ==
Some believe Catherine's family are unknown. Though it is most likely she was daughter of Charles.

Her paternal grandparents were Charles Martel of Anjou and Klementia of Habsburg. If her mother was Maria of Bytom, first wife of Charles then her maternal grandparents would be Casimir, Duke of Bytom and his wife Helena.

After the death of Catherine's mother, her father Charles married Beatrix of Luxemburg, daughter of Henry VII, Holy Roman Emperor and sister of King John I of Bohemia, probably in September 1318. On her death, Catherine's father married Elisabeth of Poland. Some believe that Elisabeth was Catherine's mother rather that Maria. If Elisabeth was Catherine's mother, then Catherine would be half Polish, as her maternal grandparents would be Władysław I the Elbow-high and Jadwiga of Greater Poland.

Catherine had one sister, Elisabeth of Hungary, who married Boleslaw Opolski. Her brother was King Louis I of Hungary.

== Marriage and later life ==
In 1338, Catherine herself married Henry II of Świdnica, son of Bernard of Świdnica and his wife Kunigunde of Poland. The couple had one daughter, Anna von Schweidnitz, who married Charles IV, Holy Roman Emperor and was mother of Wenceslaus, King of the Romans and Elizabeth of Bohemia.

Catherine was widowed in between 1343 and 1345. Catherine brought up and educated her daughter Anna at Visegrád in Hungary. At the age of 11, Anna had been promised to Wenceslaus, newborn son and heir apparent of Charles IV. After the infant Wenceslaus and his mother Anna of the Palatinate died, the now-widowed Emperor asked to marry Anna himself.

The planned marriage was part of the strategies devised by Charles and his now-deceased father John to gain control of the Piast Duchies of Silesia as vedlejší země ("neighboring countries") for the Kingdom of Bohemia. Catherine's brother, Louis I, king of Hungary and future King of Poland, was able to assist them by renouncing rights to Schweidnitz in favor of the House of Luxemburg.

After this, it is unknown what happened to Catherine. She died in 1355, about ten years after her husband. Her daughter died in childbirth in 1362. Catherine's grandson, Wenceslaus, King of the Romans, died in 1419, extinguishing Catherine's line of descent.
