= Catherine of Hungary =

Catherine of Hungary may refer to:

- Catherine of Hungary, Queen of Serbia
- Catherine of Hungary, Duchess of Świdnica
- Catherine of Hungary (1370-1378), heir presumptive to the thrones of Hungary and Poland
