= Adalbertus Ranconis de Ericinio =

Czech theologian and philosopher

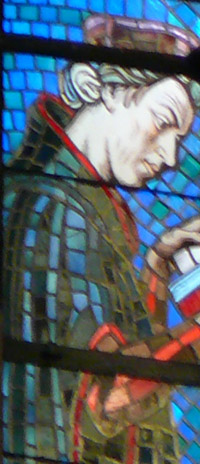

Adalbertus Ranconis de Ericinio (Czech: Vojtěch Raňkův z Ježova) (c. 1320, Malý Ježov – 15 August 1388, Prague) was a Czech theologian and philosopher. In 1355 he was appointed a rector of the University of Paris. He wrote the Tractatus de communione, a treatise on confession and the offering of the eucharist by laymen. He is also known for introducing the ideas of John Wycliff to Bohemia.

In 1378, at the funeral of Charles IV, Holy Roman Emperor, Albertus Ranconis declared the emperor pater patriae of the Kingdom of Bohemia.
