= 1346 imperial election =

- 11 July 1346

5 Prince-electors 4 electoral votes needed to win
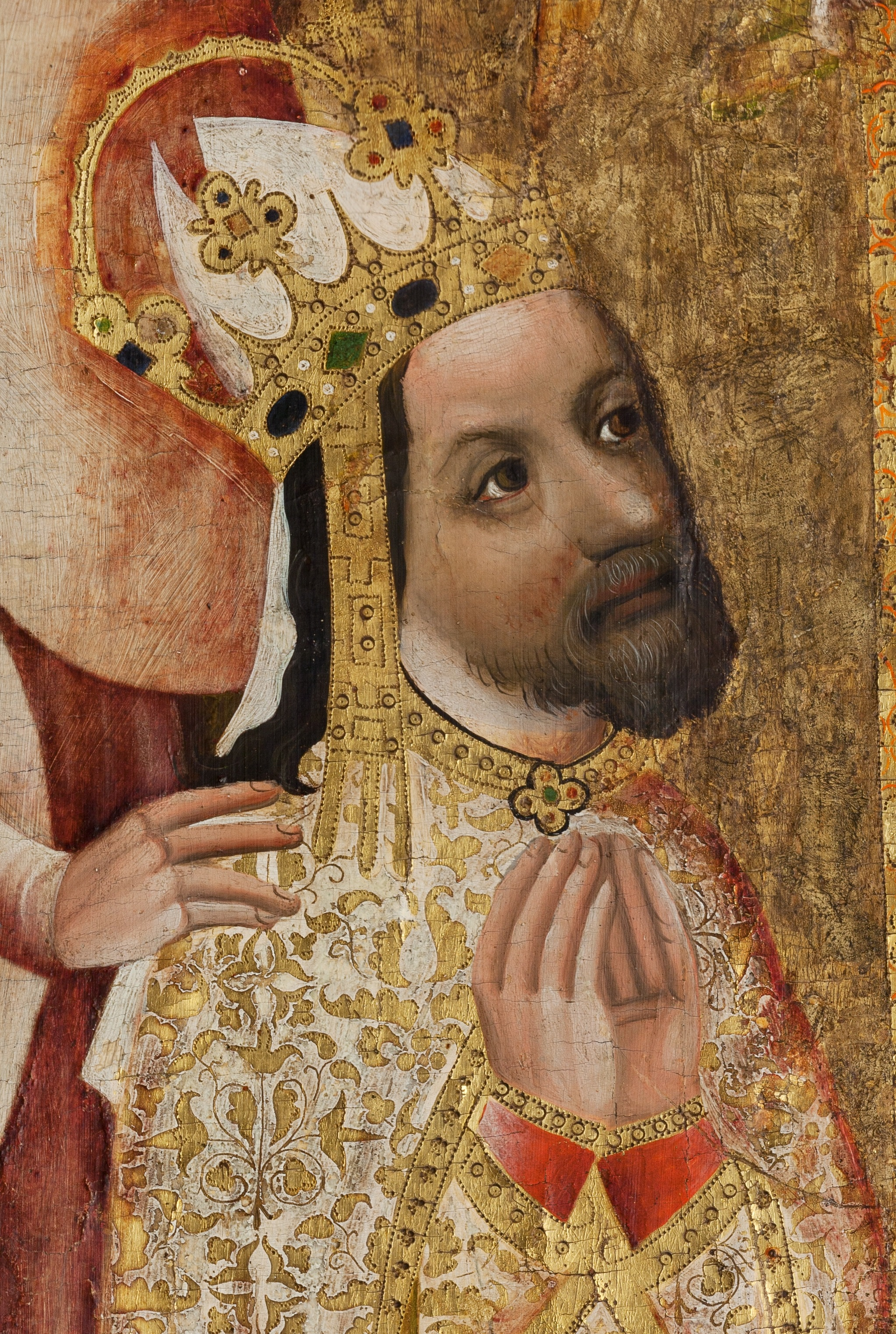
Candidate	Charles of Moravia
House	Luxembourg
Electoral vote	5
Percentage	100%
Emperor before election
Louis IV
Wittelsbach
Elected Emperor
Charles IV
Luxembourg

The imperial election of 1346 in the Holy Roman Empire was orchestrated by Pope Clement VI after the pope had pronounced the deposition of the Emperor Louis IV. The pope's candidate, Charles of Moravia, was duly elected by five of the imperial electors at Rhense on 11 July.

== Background ==
On 13 April 1346 at Avignon, Clement VI declared Louis IV a heretic and schismatic and deposed him. He preached a sermon against Louis in which he quoted from Ambrose's letter to the Emperor Valentinian II: "What could be more honourable to the emperor than to be called a son of the [church]?" Charles and his father, King John of Bohemia, were in attendance. Afterwards, Charles swore an oath to Clement that if elected he would annul all of his predecessor's acts and not spend more than one day in Rome for his imperial coronation.

== Electors ==
On 28 April 1346, Clement VI formally requested the electors to elect a new emperor. Two of the electors were Charles's relations: the king of Bohemia was his father and the archbishop of Trier was his great-uncle, Baldwin of Luxembourg. A third, the archbishop of Mainz, Gerlach of Nassau, had only been installed after Clement deposed Henry of Virneberg on 7 April 1346. Charles also received the support of Walram of Jülich, archbishop of Cologne, and Rudolf, Duke of Saxony.

== Legacy ==
Charles IV was far from having universal support in the Empire while Louis still lived. He was labelled a Pfaffenkönig (parson's king) because of the role the pope played in procuring his election. The free cities of Cologne and Aachen refused to recognise him. Charles and his father went abroad after his election to assist Philip VI of France against an English invasion. John died at the battle of Crécy and Charles was seriously injured. Because Aachen would not accept him, Charles was forced upon his return to be crowned in Bonn on 26 November. He dated his reign, however, from the moment he received papal approbation, on 6 November. This was also the day on which he took the title "King of the Romans" (until his imperial coronation). His position only became secure with the death of Louis on 11 October 1347.

== Sources ==
- Lee, Alexander. Humanism and Empire: The Imperial Ideal in Fourteenth-Century Italy. Oxford University Press, 2018.
- Wilson, Peter. Heart of Europe: A History of the Holy Roman Empire. Belknap Press, 2016.
- Wood, Diana. Clement VI: The Pontificate and Ideas of an Avignon Pope. Cambridge University Press, 1989.
