= Elizabeth of Görlitz =

Elisabeth
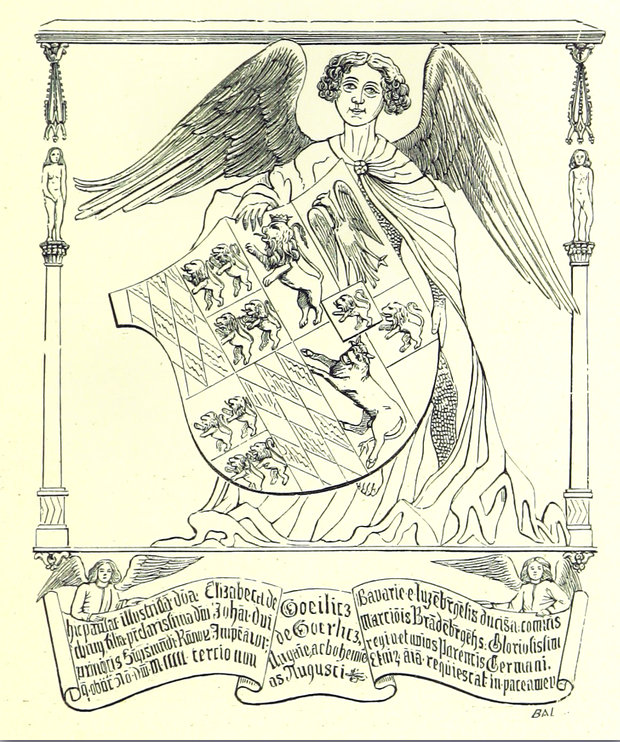
- Depiction on the tomb of Elisabeth von Görlitz, Duchess of Luxembourg, in Trier (Germany)

Duchess of Luxemburg
- Reign: 1415–1419/1425–1443
- Predecessor: Anthony
- Successor: Philip the Good
- Born: November 1390; Hořovice
- Died: 2 August 1451 (aged 60); Trier
- Spouse: Anthony, Duke of Brabant; John III, Duke of Bavaria-Straubing
- House: House of Luxembourg
- Father: John of Görlitz
- Mother: Richardis Catherine of Mecklenburg

Elisabeth of Görlitz (November 1390 – 2 August 1451) reigned as Duchess of Luxembourg from 1411 to 1443.

== Life ==
Elisabeth was the only daughter and heiress of John of Görlitz, the third son of Charles IV, Holy Roman Emperor. He was Duke of Lusatia and Görlitz, and also Elector of Brandenburg for a brief period. Her mother, Richardis Catherine of Sweden, was the daughter of King Albert of Sweden.

=== Reign ===
The Duchy of Luxembourg was mortgaged to Elisabeth by her uncle King Sigismund of Hungary, who later also became King of Bohemia and Holy Roman Emperor. He was unable to repay the loan, and subsequently left Elisabeth in control of the duchy.

Elizabeth's first marriage took place in Brussels on 16 July 1409, to Antoine, Duke of Brabant. He defended her against three uprisings of the Luxemburgian nobility, until his death in 1415.

John III, Duke of Bavaria, was Elizabeth's second husband. He died in 1425, and they did not have any children. (Note: Per Blockmans and Prevenier, "Neither of Elizabeth's marriages produced offspring.") After his death, she became heavily indebted.

=== Deposition ===
In 1441, she made a treaty with Philip III, Duke of Burgundy, allowing him to immediately assume the administrative duties of Luxemburg and inherit the duchy upon her death. He agreed to this, but chose to launch a night attack on the territory two years later, taking immediate control. Elisabeth was subsequently expelled from Luxemburg by Philip's forces.

== Sources ==
- Blockmans, Willem Pieter; Prevenier, Walter (1999). The Promised Lands: The Low Countries under Burgundian rule, 1369–1530. University Pennsylvania Press.

Elizabeth of Görlitz House of Limburg Born: November 1390 Died: 2 August 1451
Regnal titles
Preceded by Jobst	Duchess of Luxemburg; 1411–1443 with Anthony (1411–1415); John III (1418–1425)	Succeeded by Philip I
Titles in pretence
Burgundian conquest	— TITULAR — Duchess of Luxemburg; 1443–1451	Succeeded by Ladislaus
