= Blanche of Valois =

Queen of Germany from 1347 to 1348

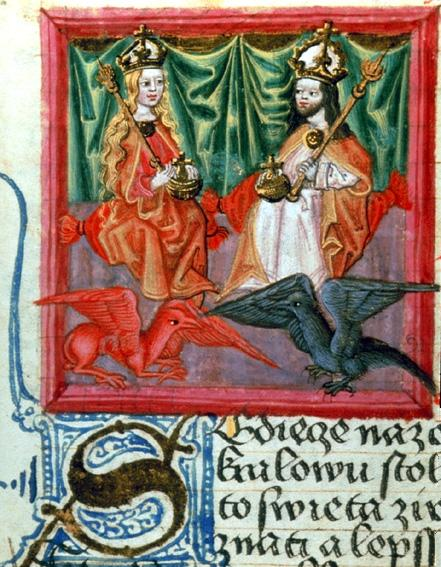

Queen consort of Germany
- Tenure: 11 October 1347 – 1 August 1348

Queen consort of Bohemia
- Tenure: 26 August 1346 – 1 August 1348
- Coronation: 2 September 1347
- Born: c. 1317
- Died: 1 August 1348; Prague
- Spouse: Charles IV, King of Bohemia (m. 1329)
- Issue: Margaret, Queen of Hungary; Catherine, Electress of Brandenburg
- House: Valois
- Father: Charles of Valois
- Mother: Mahaut of Châtillon

Blanche of Valois (baptised Marguerite; 1317–1348) was Queen of Germany and Bohemia by her marriage to King and later Holy Roman Emperor Charles IV. She was the youngest daughter of Charles of Valois and his third wife Mahaut of Châtillon.

== Early life ==
Born in 1317, Blanche was the youngest daughter of Charles of Valois and his third wife Mahaut of Châtillon. She grew up at the French court of her cousin Charles IV of France, who was a nephew to her father. She spent much time with Charles' wife Marie, who was an aunt to her future husband.

A betrothal between Blanche and Charles, eldest son of John of Bohemia was contracted in 1323. Charles had been staying at the French court as he had been sent by his father to be educated; he had been baptised Wenceslaus but changed his name upon the betrothal in honour of King Charles.

The importance of Blanche's position grew when King Charles died without male heirs and so Blanche's brother succeeded as Philip VI of France. He had his son and heir John betrothed and later married to Charles' sister, Jutta.

== Marriage ==
Modern sarcophagus of the wives of Charles IV in St. Vitus Cathedral in Prague

At Prague in May 1329, Blanche and Charles were married. The couple lived apart for the first several years of marriage; Blanche lived in Luxembourg whilst Charles was in Italy focusing on securing the Empire with his father. The couple began to live together upon Charles' return in 1334, at which time, the couple were made Margrave and Margravine of Moravia. Blanche entered Prague on 12 June with French ladies and courtiers. The couple clashed with the Bohemian nobility who had gained strength because of King John's frequent trips abroad; despite this challenge, Blanche learned Czech and German, had a social life and would remain in Bohemia when Charles traveled abroad. Within the first year of married life, the couple had a short-lived son.

Blanche was close to her stepmother-in-law, Beatrice of Bourbon. As French was the native language of both women, they communicated easily. Blanche was more popular at court than Beatrice; she was always compared unfavourably to Blanche and this was possibly because Beatrice never learned Czech or German whilst Blanche did.

John put pressure on Blanche due to the birth of only a daughter, Margaret, and the absence of a living male child. The pressure resulted in Blanche moving to Brno in 1337; for the next several years, Blanche and Charles had no children. However, the couple had a second daughter in 1342 named Katherine. On 11 July 1346, Charles was elected king of Germany in opposition to Holy Roman Emperor Louis IV. His election was supported by Pope Clement VI, who was at odds with Louis. While the conflict in Germany continued, Blanche's father-in-law John allied himself with Blanche's brother, King Philip. John was killed in the Battle of Crécy (26 August 1346). Charles escaped the battlefield relatively unharmed and succeeded to the Kingdom of Bohemia. Blanche became queen.

On 11 October 1347, Louis IV died suddenly and Charles gained wider recognition as king of Germany. However, less than a year later on 1 August 1348, Blanche died after a short illness aged thirty-two. Her death was a large blow to Charles who still did not have a son and heir, large political loss with France and a full-fledged marriage. Desperate for a son, Charles remarried the following year to Anna of Bavaria. Seven years after the death of Blanche, Charles became emperor; he was eventually succeeded by his son Václav IV and later by Sigismund, whom he had with his fourth wife Elizabeth of Pomerania.

Blanche was buried in Saint Vitus, Prague Castle.

=== Children ===
Blanche and Charles had two daughters:

- Margaret of Bohemia (1335–1349). Married Louis I of Hungary.
- Katharine of Bohemia (19 August 1342 – 26 April 1395). She first married Rudolf IV, Duke of Austria, then Otto V, Duke of Bavaria.

== In media ==
Blanche was portrayed by Czech actress Daniela Kolářová in the 1969 film Slasti Otce vlasti.

== See also ==
- Asteroid 100732 Blankavalois
- Środa treasure

== Sources ==
- Dvornik, Francis (1962). The Slavs in European History and Civilization. Rutgers University Press.
- Jaschke, Karl-Ulrich (1997). "From Famous Empresses to Unspectacular Queens". In Duggan, Anne J. (ed.). Queens and Queenship in Medieval Europe. The Boydell Press.
- Mahoney, William M. (2011). The History of the Czech Republic and Slovakia. ABC-CLIO.
- Pavlac, Brian A.; Lott, Elizabeth S., eds. (2019). "Charles IV, King of Bohemia and Holy Roman Emperor (r.1346-1378)". The Holy Roman Empire: A Historical Encyclopedia. Vol. I. ABC-CLIO. pp. 191–194.
- de Venette, Jean (1953). Newhall, Richard A. (ed.). The Chronicle of Jean de Venette. Translated by Birdsall, Jean. Columbia University Press.

Blanche of Valois House of Valois Cadet branch of the Capetian dynasty Born: 1317 Died: 1 August 1348
Royal titles
Vacant Title last held by Beatrice of Bourbon	Queen consort of Bohemia; 26 August 1346 – 1 August 1348	Vacant Title next held by Anna of Bavaria
Vacant Title last held by Margaret II of Hainaut	German Queen; 11 October 1347 – 1 August 1348	Vacant Title next held by Anna of Bavaria
