= Richardis Catherine of Mecklenburg =

Richardis Catherine of Mecklenburg (1370 or 1372 in Sweden – 1400), was a Princess of Sweden and Mecklenburg, and by marriage a Margravine consort of Moravia and Duchess consort of Görlitz (Lusatia), daughter-in-law of the Holy German Emperor.

She was the daughter of Albert, Duke of Mecklenburg, King of Sweden and Richardis of Schwerin. Richardis Catherine was married in Prague in 1388 to John of Bohemia, Margrave of Moravia and Duke of Görlitz (1370–1396), the son of Charles IV, Holy Roman Emperor and Elizabeth of Pomerania. The following year, her father was deposed as King of Sweden.

Her only daughter was Elisabeth, Duchess of Luxembourg, who died without heirs.
