= Smilovy Hory =

- Municipality
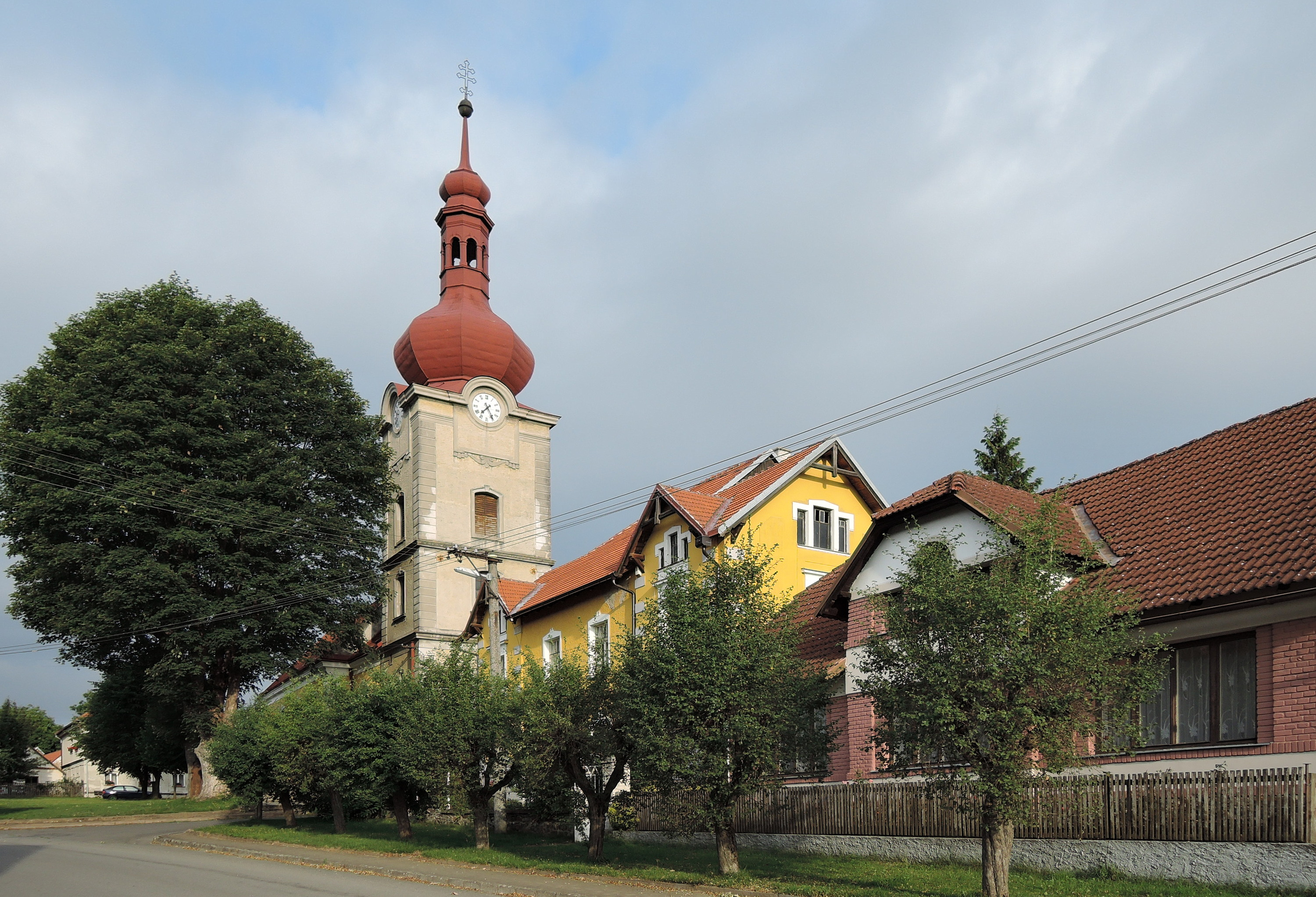
- Church of The Mission of the Saint Apostles

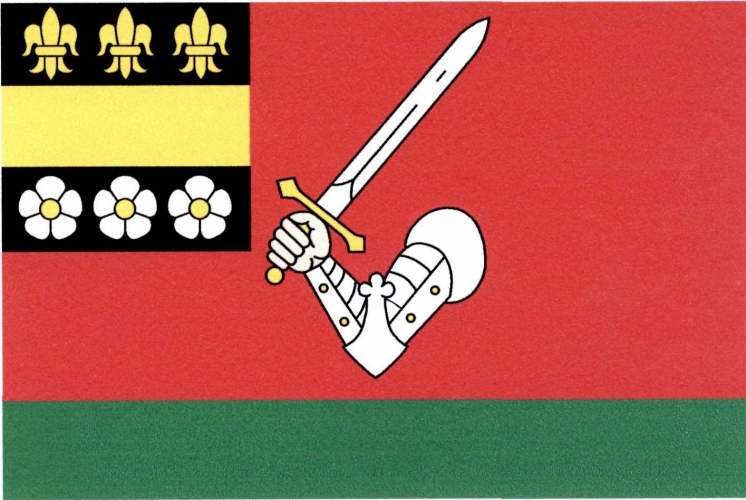
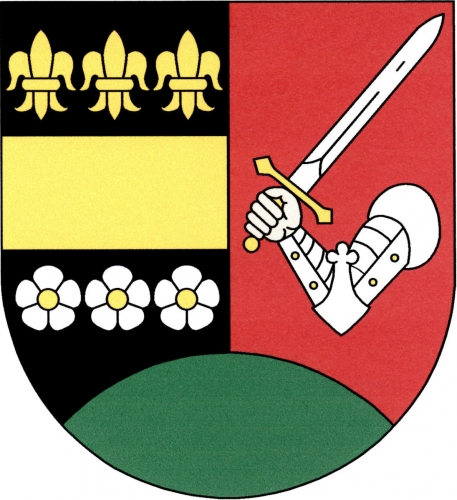
- Flag Coat of arms

- Location in the Czech Republic
- Coordinates: 49°32′11″N 14°52′33″E
- Country: Czech Republic
- Region: South Bohemian
- District: Tábor
- First mentioned: 1334

Area
  - Total: 20.82 km^{2} (8.04 sq mi)
- Elevation: 643 m (2,110 ft)

Population (2026-01-01)
  - Total: 345
  - Density: 16.6/km^{2} (42.9/sq mi)
- Time zone: UTC+1 (CET)
  - Summer (DST): UTC+2 (CEST)
- Postal code: 391 52
- Website: www.smilovyhory.cz

Smilovy Hory is a municipality and village in Tábor District in the South Bohemian Region of the Czech Republic. It has about 300 inhabitants.

Smilovy Hory lies approximately 21 kilometres (13 mi) north-east of Tábor, 69 km (43 mi) north-east of České Budějovice, and 70 km (43 mi) south-east of Prague.

== Administrative division ==
Smilovy Hory consists of seven municipal parts (in brackets population according to the 2021 census):

- Smilovy Hory (118)
- Františkov (19)
- Malý Ježov (60)
- Obrátice (4)
- Radostovice (28)
- Stojslavice (43)
- Velký Ježov (71)

== Demographics ==
Historical population
Year	Pop.	±%
1869	1,669	—
1880	1,622	−2.8%
1890	1,581	−2.5%
1900	1,511	−4.4%
1910	1,410	−6.7%
1921	1,302	−7.7%
1930	1,170	−10.1%
1950	911	−22.1%
1961	871	−4.4%
1970	766	−12.1%
1980	617	−19.5%
1991	563	−8.8%
2001	441	−21.7%
2011	352	−20.2%
2021	343	−2.6%
Source: Censuses

== Notable people ==
- Adalbertus Ranconis de Ericinio (c. 1320 – 1388), theologian and philosopher
