= Lauf Castle =

Coordinates: 49°30′36″N 11°16′55″E

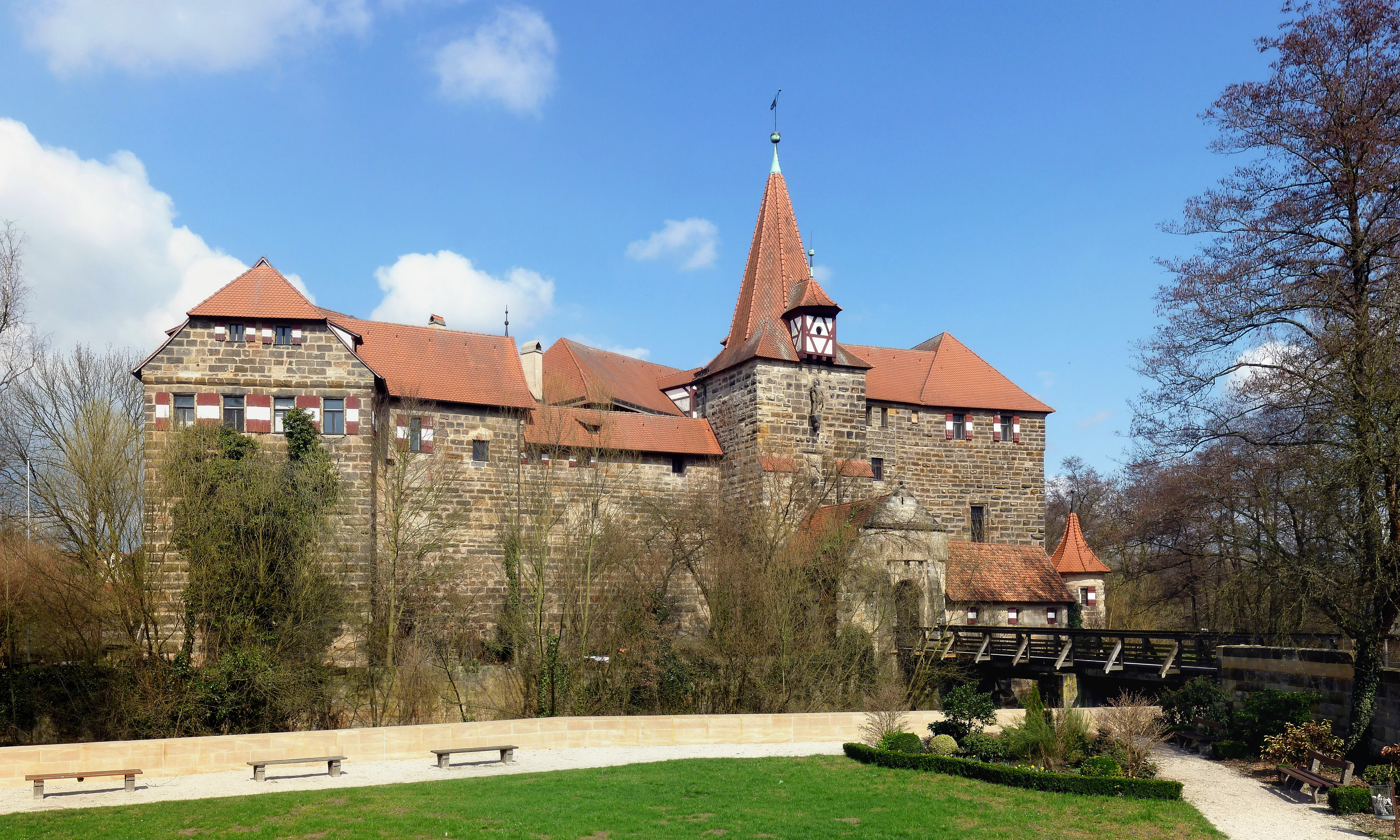
Lauf Castle

Lauf Castle (German: Wenzelschloss or Burg Lauf; Czech: hrad Lauf) was originally a medieval fortress in the town of Lauf an der Pegnitz near Nuremberg, Germany. The German name Wenzelschloss ("Saint Wenceslas' Castle") is derived from to the present day surviving statue of Saint Wenceslas, patron saint of Czechs, on the facade of the entrance gate. The castle was built by the Charles IV, Holy Roman Emperor in 1356, on the way between Prague and Nuremberg on the ruins of an older castle. The dominant feature of the castle is the hall of arms; in 1934, under a layer of old paint were discovered 112 coats of arms of noblemen of the Crown of Bohemia. It is the most precious collection of Bohemian, Moravian and Silesian secular and ecclesiastical heraldry.

Lauf laid in an area called the Bohemian Palatinate, which was once part of the Bohemian crown lands. In 1373 Emperor Charles IV ceded the castle along with parts of the Bohemian Palatinate to Otto V, Duke of Bavaria in exchange for the Margraviate of Brandenburg. Charles' son Wenceslaus IV lost the rest of the Palatinate in 1401.
