= Catherine of Bohemia =

- Duchess consort of Austria and Bavaria; Electress consort of Brandenburg
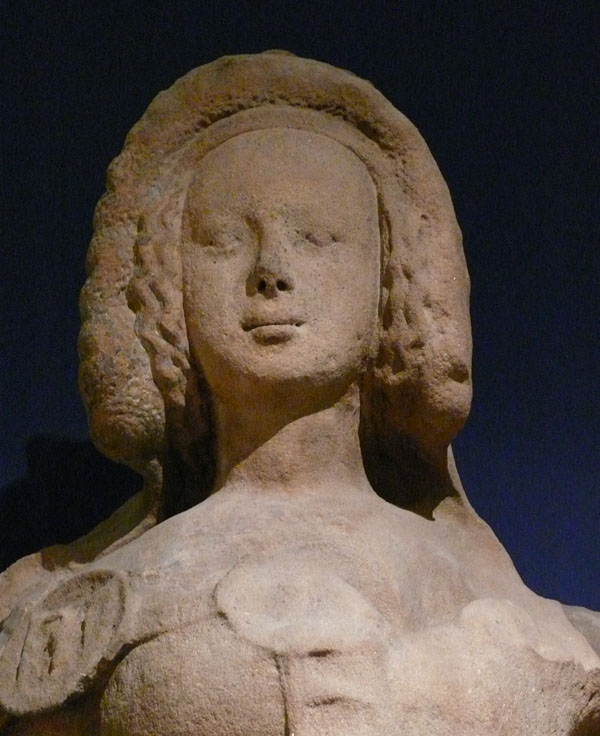
- Statue of Catherine of Bohemia and Luxembourg
- Born: 19 August 1342; Prague, Bohemia
- Died: 26 April 1395 (aged 52); Perchtoldsdorf, Lower Austria
- Spouse: Rudolf IV, Duke of Austria; Otto V, Duke of Bavaria
- House: House of Luxembourg
- Father: Charles IV, Holy Roman Emperor
- Mother: Blanche of Valois

Catherine of Bohemia (Czech: Kateřina Lucemburská, German: Katharina von Böhmen; 19 August 1342 – 26 April 1395) also known as Catherine of Luxembourg was Electress of Brandenburg, the second daughter of Holy Roman Emperor Charles IV and Blanche of Valois.

Catherine was born on 19 August 1342, the third child and second surviving daughter of Charles IV, Holy Roman Emperor, and his first wife Blanche of Valois. On 13 July 1356, Catherine married Rudolf IV, Duke of Austria. The marriage was a political one arranged by her father to make peace with Austria. Rudolph died after nine years of childless marriage.

On 19 March 1366, Catherine married Otto V, Duke of Bavaria.

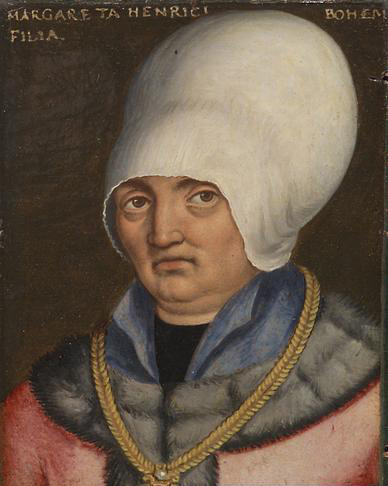
Katharina of Bohemia

== Sources ==
- Geaman, Kristen L. (2022). Anne of Bohemia. Routledge.
- Urban, William L. (1989). The Samogitian Crusade. Lithuanian Research and Studies Center.
