= Charles IV, Holy Roman Emperor =

Holy Roman Emperor from 1355 to 1378

Charles IV
- Imperator Romanorum
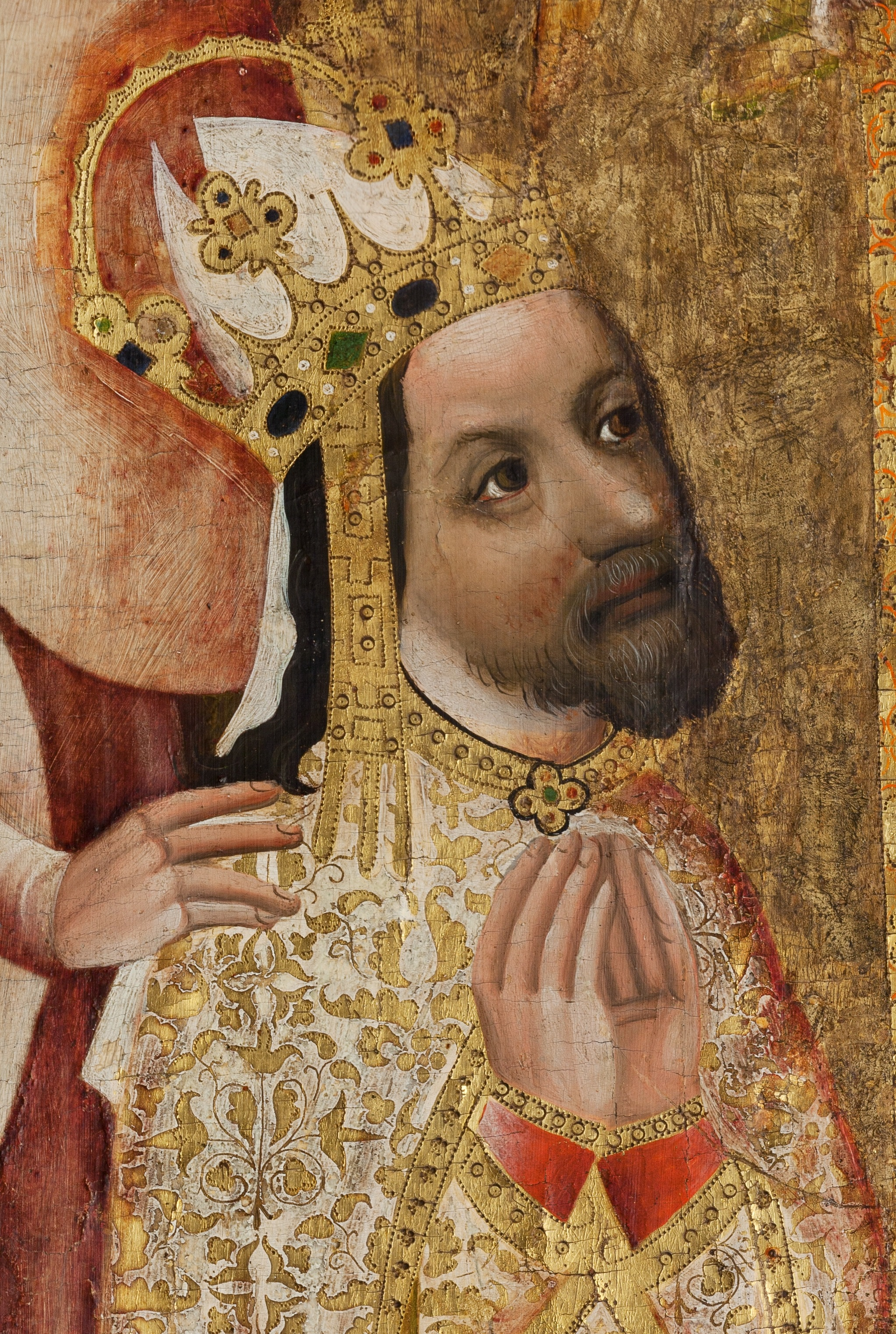
- Portrait detail from Votive Panel of Jan Očko of Vlašim, c. 1371

Holy Roman Emperor King of Italy
- Reign: 1355 – 29 November 1378
- Coronation: 6 January 1355, Milan (Italian); 5 April 1355, Rome (Imperial)
- Predecessor: Louis IV
- Successor: Sigismund

King of the Romans King of Germany
- Reign: 11 July 1346 – 29 November 1378
- Coronation: 26 November 1346, Bonn
- Predecessor: Louis IV
- Successor: Wenceslaus

King of Bohemia
- Reign: 26 August 1346 – 29 November 1378
- Coronation: 2 September 1347, Prague
- Predecessor: John
- Successor: Wenceslaus IV
- Born: 14 May 1316; Prague, Bohemia
- Died: 29 November 1378 (aged 62); Prague, Bohemia
- Burial: St. Vitus Cathedral, Prague
- Spouses: Blanche of Valois (m. 1329; died 1348) Anne of Bavaria (m. 1349; died 1353) Anna von Schweidnitz (m. 1353; died 1362) Elizabeth of Pomerania (m. 1363)
- Issue: Margaret, Queen of Hungary; Catherine, Duchess of Austria and Bavaria; Elisabeth, Duchess of Austria; Wenceslas, King of Bohemia and Germany; Anne, Queen of England; Sigismund, Holy Roman Emperor; John, Duke of Görlitz; Margaret, Burgravine of Nuremberg
- House: Luxembourg
- Father: John of Bohemia
- Mother: Elisabeth of Bohemia

Coat of arms of the House of Luxembourg–Bohemia

Arms of Charles IV as Holy Roman Emperor

Charles IV (German: Karl IV.; Czech: Karel IV.; Latin: Carolus IV; also known as Charles of Luxembourg German: Karl von Luxemburg; Czech: Karel Lucemburský; Latin: Carolus Luxemburgensis; Luxembourgish: Karel vu Lëtzebuerg; born Wenceslaus German: Wenzel; Czech: Václav; 14 May 1316 – 29 November 1378) was Holy Roman Emperor from 1355 until his death in 1378. He was elected King of Germany (King of the Romans) in 1346 and became King of Bohemia (as Charles I) that same year. He was a member of the House of Luxembourg from his father's side and the Bohemian House of Přemysl from his mother's side; he emphasized the latter due to his lifelong affinity for the Bohemian side of his inheritance, and also because his direct ancestors in the Přemyslid line included two saints.

He was the eldest son and heir of John of Bohemia, King of Bohemia and Count of Luxembourg, who died at the Battle of Crécy on 26 August 1346. His mother, Elizabeth, Queen of Bohemia, was the sister of Wenceslaus III, King of Bohemia and Poland, the last of the male Přemyslid rulers of Bohemia. Charles inherited the County of Luxembourg from his father and was elected king of the Kingdom of Bohemia. On 2 September 1347, Charles was crowned King of Bohemia.

On 11 July 1346, the prince-electors chose him as King of the Romans (rex Romanorum) in opposition to Louis IV, Holy Roman Emperor of the House of Wittelsbach. Charles was crowned on 26 November 1346 in Bonn. After his opponent died, he was re-elected in 1349 and crowned King of the Romans. In 1355, he was crowned King of Italy and Holy Roman Emperor. With his coronation as King of Burgundy at Arles in 1365, he became the crowned ruler of all the kingdoms of the Holy Roman Empire. Having played a key part in the political and cultural history of the Kingdom of Bohemia, he remains a popular historical figure in the Czech lands.

The Golden Bull of 1356 marked a structural change in the politics of the Holy Roman Empire. Several aspects of his legacy remain contentious, however. The image of Charles as a wise, pious, peace-loving king (partly constructed by Charles himself) has proved influential until this day, supported by several artistic or scholarly projects produced during Charles's reign or afterwards.

== Life ==
=== Birth and childhood ===
Charles was born to John of Bohemia of the Luxembourg dynasty and Queen Elizabeth of Bohemia of the Bohemian Přemyslid dynasty in Prague. His maternal grandfather was the Bohemian King Wenceslaus II. He chose the name Charles at his confirmation in honor of his grand uncle, King Charles IV of France, at whose court he resided for seven years.

Charles received French education and was literate and fluent in five languages: Latin, Czech, German, French, and Italian.

=== Italy and Moravia ===
In 1331, Charles gained some experience of warfare with his father in Italy. At the beginning of 1333, he went to Lucca, Tuscany, to consolidate his rule there. To strengthen the city's defences, Charles founded the nearby fortress and the town of Montecarlo ("Mount Charles").

From 1333, he administered the lands of the Bohemian Crown due to his father's frequent absence and deteriorating eyesight. In 1334, Charles was named Margrave of Moravia, the traditional title of heirs to the throne. Two years later, he assumed the government of Tyrol on behalf of his brother, John Henry, and was soon actively involved in a struggle for the possession of that county.

=== King of the Romans ===
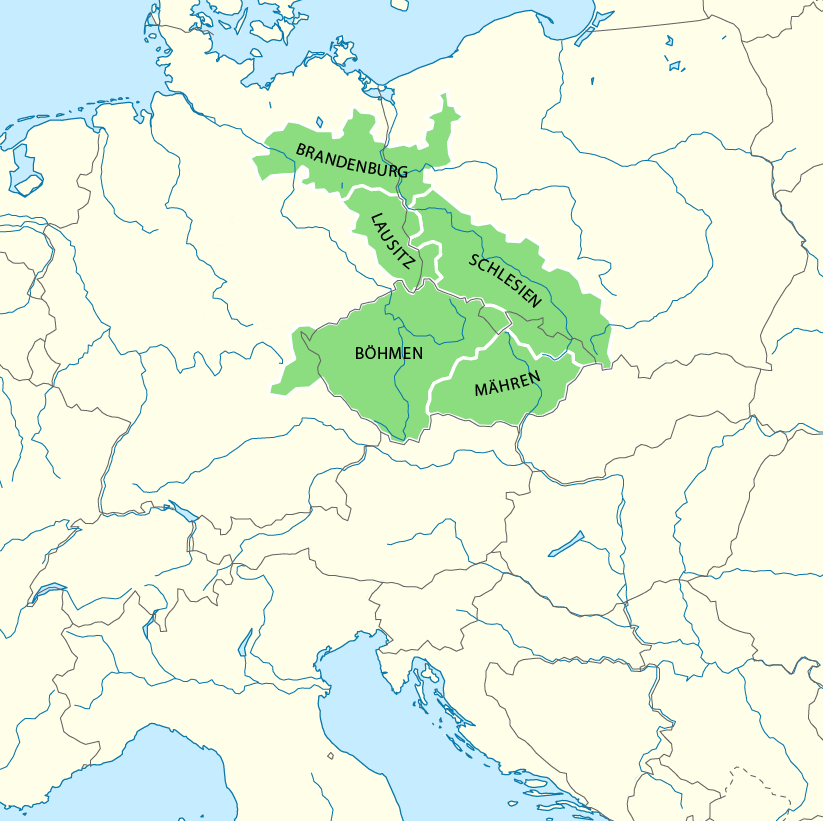
Lands of the Bohemian Crown ruled by Charles IV

On 11 July 1346, in consequence of an alliance between his father and Pope Clement VI, a relentless enemy of the emperor Louis IV, Charles was elected Roman king in opposition to Louis by some of the prince-electors at Rhens. Having previously promised to be subservient to Clement, he made extensive concessions to the pope in 1347. Confirming the papacy in the possession of vast territories, he promised to annul the acts of Louis against Clement, to take no part in Italian affairs, and to defend and protect the church.

Charles IV was in a very weak position in Germany. Because of the terms of his election, he was derisively referred to as a "Priests' King" (Pfaffenkönig). Many bishops and nearly all of the Imperial cities remained loyal to Louis the Bavarian. Worse still, Charles backed the wrong side in the Hundred Years' War and lost his father and many of his best knights at the Battle of Crécy in August 1346, where he escaped from the field wounded.

Civil war in Germany was prevented, however, when Louis IV died on 11 October 1347, after suffering a stroke during a bear hunt. In January 1349, partisans from the House of Wittelsbach attempted to have Günther von Schwarzburg elected king, but he attracted few supporters and was defeated by Charles at the siege of Eltville in May. After this, Charles's claim to the Imperial throne faced no direct threat.

Charles initially worked to secure his power base. Bohemia had remained untouched by the plague. Prague became his capital, and he rebuilt the city on the model of Paris, establishing the New Town (Nové Město). In 1348, he founded the university of Prague, which was the first university in Central Europe and later named after him. The university trained administrators and lawyers, and Prague soon emerged as the intellectual and cultural center of Central Europe.

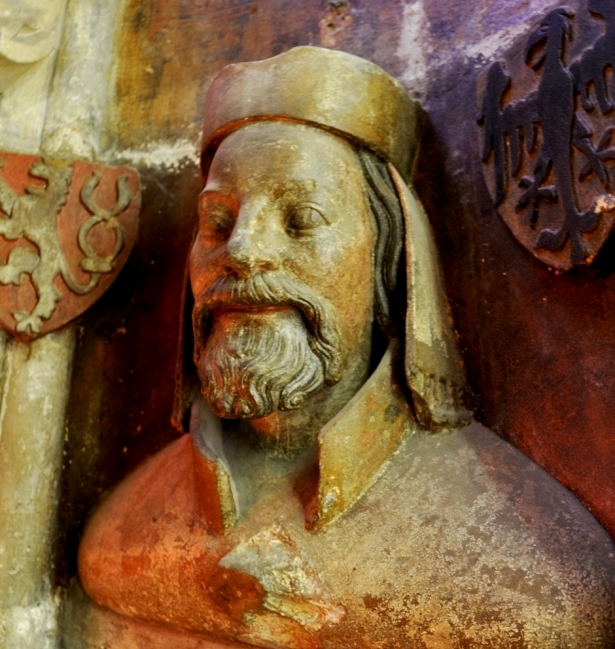
Bust of Charles IV in St. Vitus Cathedral, 1370s

Having exploited the difficulties of his opponents, Charles was again elected in Frankfurt on 17 June 1349 and re-crowned at Aachen on 25 July 1349. He was soon the undisputed ruler of the Empire. Gifts or promises had won the support of the Rhenish and Swabian towns; a marriage alliance secured the friendship of the Habsburgs; and an alliance with Rudolf II of Bavaria, Count Palatine of the Rhine, was obtained when Charles, who had become a widower in 1348, married Rudolph's daughter Anna.

On 1 August 1350, the king was visited at Prague by the Roman tribune Cola di Rienzo, who urged him to go to Italy, where the poet Petrarch and the citizens of Florence also implored his presence. Turning a deaf ear to these entreaties, Charles kept Cola in prison for a year and then handed him as a prisoner to Clement at Avignon.

In October 1350, Charles traveled to compete in a jousting tournament in Italy, where he ended up suffering a traumatic head injury, breaking his jaw. After this event, Charles was returned to Prague to recover and stayed out of public view for the next four months. The trauma left Charles with permanent scars and a hunchback.

Outside Prague, Charles attempted to expand the Bohemian crown lands, using his imperial authority to acquire fiefs in Silesia, the Upper Palatinate, and Franconia. The latter regions comprised "New Bohemia", a string of possessions intended to link Bohemia with the Luxemburg territories in the Rhineland. The Bohemian estates, however, were not willing to support Charles in these ventures. When Charles sought to codify Bohemian law in the Maiestas Carolina of 1355, he met with sharp resistance. After that point, Charles found it expedient to scale back his efforts at centralization.

=== Holy Roman Emperor ===
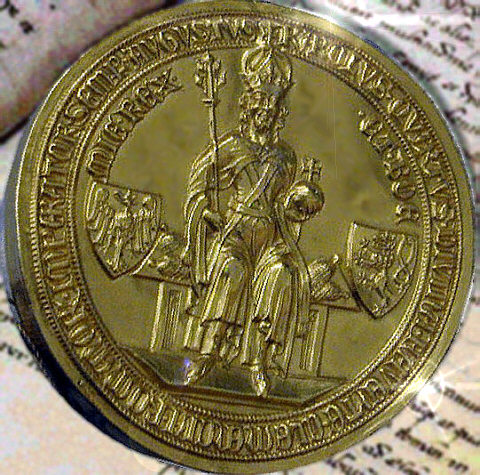
The Golden Bull of 1356

In 1354, Charles crossed the Alps without an army, received the Lombard crown in St. Ambrose Basilica, Milan, on 6 January 1355, and was crowned emperor at Rome by a cardinal on 5 April of the same year. His sole object appears to have been to obtain the Imperial crown in peace, in accordance with a promise previously made to Pope Clement. He only remained in the city for a few hours, in spite of the expressed wishes of the Roman people. Having virtually abandoned all the Imperial rights in Italy, the emperor re-crossed the Alps, pursued by the scornful words of Petrarch, but laden with considerable wealth. On his return, Charles was occupied with the administration of the Empire, then just recovering from the Black Death, and in 1356, he promulgated the famous Golden Bull to regulate the election of the king.

Charles's possessions at the signing of the Golden Bull of 1356

Having given Moravia to one brother, John Henry, and erected the county of Luxembourg into a duchy for another, Wenceslaus, he was unremitting in his efforts to secure other territories as compensation and to strengthen the Bohemian monarchy. To this end he purchased part of the Upper Palatinate in 1353, and in 1367 annexed Lower Lusatia to Bohemia and bought numerous estates in various parts of Germany. On the death of Meinhard, Duke of Upper Bavaria and Count of Tyrol, in 1363, Upper Bavaria was claimed by the sons of the emperor Louis IV, and Tyrol by Rudolf IV, Duke of Austria. Both claims were admitted by Charles on the understanding that if these families died out both territories should pass to the House of Luxembourg. At about the same time, he was promised the succession to the Margravate of Brandenburg, which he actually obtained for his son Wenceslaus in 1373.

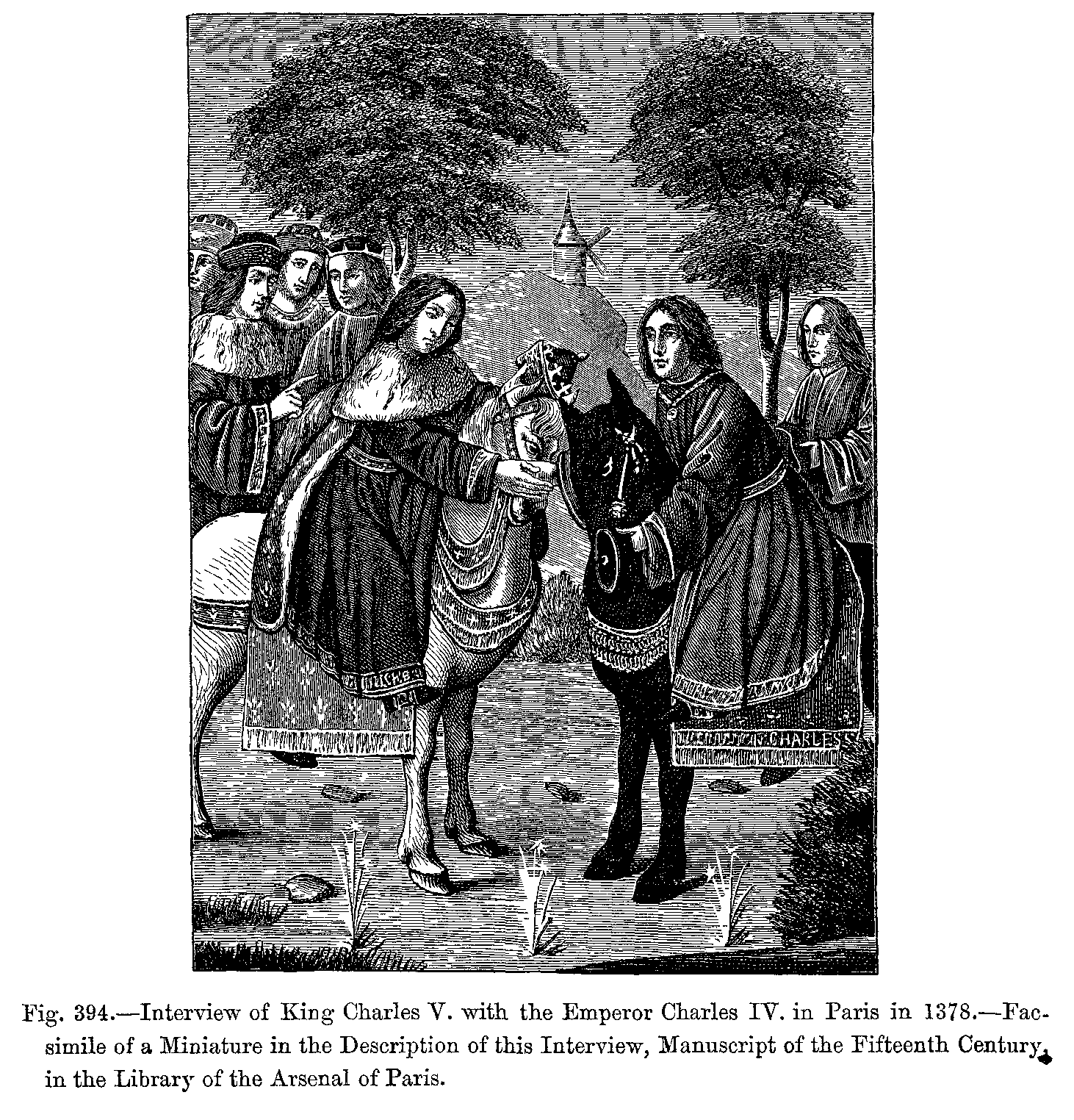
Meeting with Charles V of France in Paris in 1378, facsimile of a fifteenth-century manuscript in the Bibliothèque de l'Arsenal

Modern sarcophagus of Charles IV

Besides Germany and Italy, Charles IV also held sovereignty over the old Kingdom of Burgundy (Arles), that was divided in several feudal domains, one of them being the Dauphiné of Viennois, that was acquired in 1349 by the French royal House of Valois, as a domain within the Holy Roman Empire. Thus in 1356, the young French prince Charles, who was the ruling Dauphin of Viennois, made an homage to the emperor at Metz, and received imperial confirmation, also being appointed as the imperial vicar in Dauphiné.

In the spring of 1365, the emperor appointed count Amadeus VI of Savoy as imperial vicar over central regions of the Arlesian realm, from Lausanne and Geneva, to Lyon and Grenoble. On 4 June 1365, Charles IV was solemnly crowned as king at Arles by cardinal Guillaume de La Garde, the Archbishop of Arles, in the presence of high representatives of various regions, including Provence, Dauphiné and Savoy, thus becoming the last emperor who received the royal crown of the old Kingdom of Burgundy (Arles). Already in 1366, Charles IV decided to relieve count Amadeus VI of his duties as imperial vicar in the region, and in 1378, the emperor appointed dauphin Charles of Viennois as the imperial vicar of Burgundy (Arles), but only for his lifetime.

Casimir III of Poland and Louis I of Hungary entered a conspiracy against Charles and managed to persuade Otto V of Bavaria to join. After the repeal of the estate contract by margrave Otto, in early July 1371, Charles IV declared hostilities and invaded the Margraviate of Brandenburg; after two years of conflict, Brandenburg became part of the Czech lands in 1373. This was when he gave the order to measure his new territory, its villages, people, and income. This was recorded in the Landbuch of Charles IV, which was finished in 1375. Many villages were mentioned for the first time in this book, so it can provide information on how old they are. He also gained a considerable portion of Silesian territory, partly by inheritance through his third wife, Anna von Schweidnitz, daughter of Henry II, Duke of Świdnica, and Catherine of Hungary. In 1365, Charles visited Pope Urban V at Avignon and undertook to escort him to Rome; on the same occasion he was crowned King of Burgundy at Arles.

His second journey to Italy took place in 1368, when he had a meeting with Pope Urban V at Viterbo, who was besieged in his palace at Siena, and left the country before the end of 1369. During his later years, the emperor took little part in German affairs beyond securing the election of his son Wenceslaus as king of the Romans in 1376 and negotiating a peace between the Swabian League of Cities and some nobles in 1378. After dividing his lands between his three sons and his nephews, he died in November 1378 at Prague, where he was buried, and where a statue was erected to his memory in 1848.

Charles IV suffered from gout (metabolic arthritis), a painful disease quite common in that time.

== Legacy ==
=== Evaluation ===
The reign of Charles IV was characterized by a transformation in the nature of the Empire and is remembered as the Golden Age of Bohemia. He promulgated the Golden Bull of 1356 whereby the succession to the imperial title was laid down, which held for the next four centuries.

He also organized the states of the empire into peace-keeping confederations. In these, the Imperial cities figured prominently. The Swabian Landfriede confederation of 1370 was made up almost entirely of Imperial Cities. At the same time, the leagues were organized and led by the crown and its agents. As with the electors, the cities that served in these leagues were given privileges to aid in their efforts to keep the peace.

He assured his dominance over the eastern borders of the Empire through succession treaties with the Habsburgs and the purchase of Brandenburg. He also claimed imperial lordship over the crusader states of Prussia and Livonia.

Unlike several of his predecessors, Charles IV pursued a less interventionist policy in Italy. He avoided military involvement in the local Guelph and Ghibelline conflicts while actively seeking accommodation with the Papacy.

In 2005 Charles IV ranked the first in the TV show Největší Čech, the Czech spin-off of the BBC Greatest Britons show.

=== Patronage of culture and the arts ===
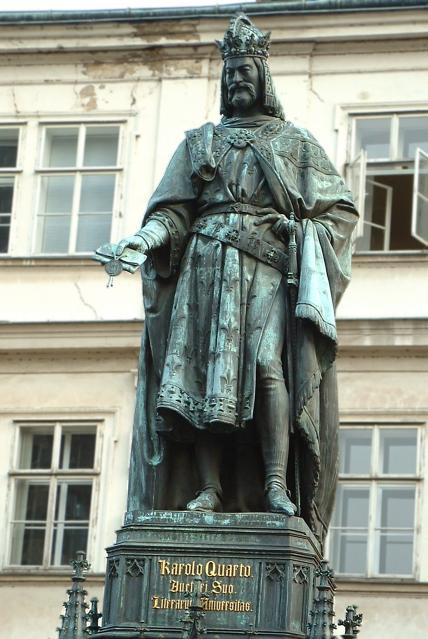
Statue of Charles IV near Charles Bridge (1848), Prague, by Ernst Julius Hähnel

Prague became the capital of the Holy Roman Empire during the reign of Charles IV. The name of the royal founder and patron remains on many monuments and institutions, for example Charles University, Charles Bridge, Charles Square. High Gothic Prague Castle and part of the cathedral of Saint Vitus by Peter Parler were also built under his patronage. Finally, the first flowering of manuscript painting in Prague dates from Charles's reign. In the present Czech Republic, he is still regarded as Pater Patriae (father of the country or otec vlasti), a title first applied to him by Adalbertus Ranconis de Ericinio at his funeral.

Charles also had strong ties to Nuremberg, staying within its city walls 52 times and thereby strengthening its reputation amongst German cities. Charles was the patron of the Nuremberg Frauenkirche, built between 1352 and 1362 (the architect was likely Peter Parler), where the imperial court worshipped during its stays in Nuremberg.

Charles's imperial policy was focused on the dynastic sphere and abandoned the lofty ideal of the Empire as a universal monarchy of Christendom. In 1353, he granted the Duchy of Luxembourg to his half-brother, Wenceslaus. He concentrated his energies chiefly on the economic and intellectual development of Bohemia, where he founded the university in 1348 and encouraged the early humanists. He corresponded with Petrarch and invited him to visit the royal residence in Prague, whilst the Italian hoped – to no avail – to see Charles move his residence to Rome and reawaken the tradition of the Roman Empire.

Charles's sister Bona married the eldest son of Philip VI of France, the future John II of France, in 1335. Thus, Charles was the maternal uncle of Charles V of France, who solicited his relative's advice at Metz in 1356 during the Parisian Revolt. This family connection was celebrated publicly when Charles made a solemn visit to his nephew in 1378, just months before his death. A detailed account of the occasion, enriched by many splendid miniatures, can be found in Charles V's copy of the Grandes Chroniques de France.

=== Castles ===
Castles built or established by Charles IV:

- Karlštejn, 1348–1355 in Central Bohemian Region for safekeeping the Imperial Regalia, especially the Imperial Crown of the Holy Roman Empire (later the Czech Crown Jewels were also kept there)
- Kašperk (Karlsberg), 1356 in Kašperské Hory in Plzeň Region
- Lauf (Wenzelsburg) – built on the way connecting Prague and Nuremberg in Bohemian Palatinate, inside survived 112 coats of arms of the Bohemian Kingdom
- Montecarlo in Italy
- Radyně (Karlskrone) – around 1360 in Plzeň Region
- Hrádek u Purkarce (Karlshaus) – around 1357
- Tepenec (Twingenberg, Karlsburg) in Jívová in Olomouc Region
- Karlsfried

=== Places named after Charles IV ===
Czech Republic

- Karlovy Vary, a spa city
- Charles Bridge (Karlův most), Prague
- Charles University (Univerzita Karlova), Prague
- Squares (Karlovo náměstí, náměstí Karla IV.) – in Prague (Charles Square), Brno, Třebíč, Kolín, Mělník, Náchod, Pelhřimov, Roudnice nad Labem, Nejdek and Polná
- Multiple streets (Karlova [ulice])
- Karlštejn, a market town beyond the eponymous castle, was named after the castle

Italy

- Montecarlo (Charles' Mountain), a municipality

=== Other ===
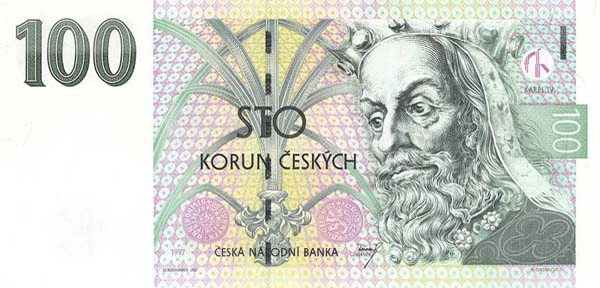
100-CZK banknote

- The 100-Czech koruna banknote
- 16951 Carolus Quartus, an asteroid

== Family ==
=== Genealogy ===
==== Fictive genealogy ====
Imperial genealogists invented early House of Luxembourg forefathers for Charles IV, extending back to Noah via Jupiter and Saturn.

==== Historical genealogy ====
Henry VII (Henry of Luxembourg) c. 1273 – 24 August 1313; King of the Romans; King of Italy; Holy Roman Emperor	Margaret of Brabant; 4 October 1276 – 14 December 1311	Judith of Habsburg; 13 March 1271 – 18 June 1297	Wenceslaus II; 27 September 1271 – 21 June 1305; King of Bohemia; King of Poland
John the Blind (John of Luxembourg); King of Bohemia; 10 August 1296 – 26 August 1346	Elisabeth of Bohemia; 20 January 1292 – 28 September 1330	Wenceslaus III; 1289–1306; King of Hungary; King of Croatia; King of Bohemia; King of Poland
m1. 15 May 1323	m2. March 1349	m3. 27 May 1353	m4. 21 May 1363
Blanche of Valois; 1316 – 1 August 1348	Anne of Bavaria; 26 September 1329 – 2 February 1353	Charles IV (Wenceslaus/Charles of Luxembourg); 14 May 1316 – 29 November 1378; King of Bohemia; King of the Romans; King of Italy; Holy Roman Emperor	Anna von Schweidnitz; 1339 – 11 July 1362	Elizabeth of Pomerania c. 1347 – 14 February 1393
son born 1334	Margaret of Bohemia; 1335–1349	Catherine of Bohemia; 1342–1395	Wenceslas; 1350–1351
Elisabeth of Bohemia; 1358–1373	Wenceslaus IV (Wenceslaus of Luxembourg); 1361–1419; King of Germany; King of Bohemia	son 1362
Richard II; 1367–1400; King of England	Anne of Bohemia; 1366–1394	Sigismund (Sigismund of Luxembourg); 1368–1437; King of Bohemia; Holy Roman Emperor; King of Hungary	John of Görlitz; 1370–1396	Charles; 1372–1373	Margaret of Bohemia; 1373–1410	Henry; 1377–1378

=== Marriages and children ===
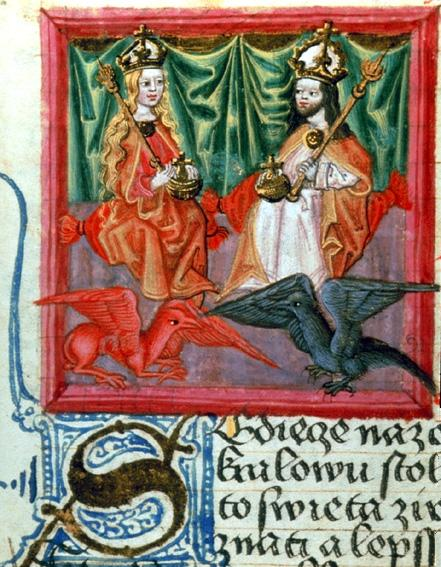
Charles and his first wife, Blanche

Charles was married four times. His first wife was Blanche of Valois (1316–1348), daughter of Charles, Count of Valois, and a half-sister of King Philip VI of France. They had three children:

- son (born 1334), died young.
- Margaret of Bohemia, Queen of Hungary (1335–1349); married King Louis I of Hungary.
- Catherine of Bohemia (1342–1395); married Rudolf IV, Duke of Austria, and Otto V, Duke of Bavaria and Elector of Brandenburg.

He secondly married Anna of Bavaria, (1329–1353), daughter of Rudolf II, Count Palatine of the Rhine; they had one son:

- Wenceslaus (1350–1351).

His third wife was Anna von Schweidnitz, (1339–1362), daughter of Henry II, Duke of Świdnica, and Katharina of Anjou (daughter of Charles I Robert, King of Hungary), by whom he had three children:

- Elisabeth of Bohemia (19 April 1358 – 4 September 1373); married Albert III, Duke of Austria, at the very young age of 8 and died at the age of 15, they had no children.
- Wenceslaus IV of Bohemia (1361–1419); later elected King of Germany (formally King of the Romans) and on his father's death, became King of Bohemia (as Wenceslaus IV) and Emperor-elect of the Holy Roman Empire; married firstly to Joanna of Bavaria in 1370 and secondly to Sophia of Bavaria in 1389.
- son (born and died 11 July 1362).

His fourth wife was Elizabeth of Pomerania, (1345 or 1347 – 1393), daughter of Bogislaw V, Duke of Pomerania, and Elisabeth of Poland, who was the daughter of King Casimir III of Poland. They had six children:

- Anne of Bohemia, Queen of England (1366–1394); married King Richard II of England.
- Sigismund of Bohemia (1368–1437); later became Holy Roman Emperor, was King of Bohemia, Margrave of Brandenburg, and also King of Hungary through his first marriage to Mary, Queen of Hungary, in 1385. His second marriage was to Barbara of Cilli, the daughter and youngest child of Herman II, Count of Celje, in 1405/1408.
- John of Bohemia (1370–1396); later Margrave of Moravia and Duke of Görlitz; married Richardis Catherine of Sweden, the daughter of Albert, King of Sweden. His only daughter and heiress Elisabeth of Görlitz was Duchess of Luxembourg.
- Charles (13 March 1372 – 24 July 1373).
- Margaret of Bohemia, Burgravine of Nuremberg (1373–1410); married John III, Burgrave of Nuremberg.
- Henry (1377–1378).

Charles had one illegitimate son, William, born in 1362 to an unknown woman. He was raised in Brabant and seems to have joined his father at the time of the latter's trip to France in 1377. He was acknowledged by his father, who sought a papal dispensation for him to marry within the fourth degree. It is unknown if he ever married. He served his Bohemian relatives as a diplomat, but his ultimate fate is unknown.

== See also ==
- Cultural depictions of Charles IV, Holy Roman Emperor
- List of Bohemian monarchs
- List of Holy Roman Emperors

== Literature ==
- Boehm, Barbara Drake; Fajt, Jiri, eds. (2005). Prague: The Crown of Bohemia, 1347–1437. Yale University Press. ISBN 978-0300111385.
- Cox, Eugene L. (1967). The Green Count of Savoy: Amedeus VI and Transalpine Savoy in the Fourteenth-Century. Princeton: Princeton University Press.
- Dvornik, Francis (1962). The Slavs in European History and Civilization. Rutgers University Press.
- Fajt, Jiří (2003). Court Chapels of the High and Late Middle Ages and Their Artistic Decoration. Národní galerie v Praze.
- Fritz, Wolfgang D., ed. (2022) [1992]. Monumenta Germaniae Historica: Constitutiones et acta publica imperatorum et regum. Vol. 11. Wiesbaden: Harassowitz Verlag.
- Jaschke, Karl-Ulrich (1997). "From Famous Empresses to Unspectacular Queens". In Duggan, Anne J. (ed.). Queens and Queenship in Medieval Europe. The Boydell Press. ISBN 978-0230276468.
- Wilson, Peter (2016). Heart of Europe: A History of the Holy Roman Empire. Cambridge: Harvard University Press.

Charles IV, Holy Roman Emperor House of Luxembourg Born: 14 May 1316 Died: 29 November 1378
Regnal titles
Preceded by John	Count of Luxembourg; 1346–1353	Succeeded by Wenceslaus I
Preceded by John	King of Bohemia; 1346–1378	Succeeded by Wenceslaus IV & I
Preceded by Louis IV	King of the Romans; 1346–1378 (until 1347 in opposition to Louis IV) (in 1349 opposed by Günther von Schwarzburg)	Succeeded by Wenceslaus IV & I
Preceded by Louis IV	Holy Roman Emperor; 1355–1378	Vacant Interregnum Title next held by Sigismund
