= John of Görlitz =

John
- Coat of arms of John of Görlitz

Duke of Görlitz
- Reign: 1377–1396
- Born: 22 June 1370; Prague, Bohemia
- Died: 1 March 1396 (aged 25); Neuzelle Abbey, Lower Lusatia
- Burial: St. Vitus Cathedral, Prague
- Spouse: Richardis Catherine of Mecklenburg
- Issue: Elizabeth of Görlitz
- House: House of Luxembourg
- Father: Charles IV, Holy Roman Emperor
- Mother: Elizabeth of Pomerania

John of Görlitz (also known as John of Bohemia and John of Luxembourg; 22 June 1370 – 1 March 1396) was a member of the House of Luxembourg and the only Duke of Görlitz (Zgorzelec) from 1377 until his death.

== Life ==
Born in Prague, John was the third son of Emperor Charles IV (1316–1378) from his fourth marriage with the Griffin princess Elizabeth (c. 1347–1393), daughter of Duke Bogislaw V of Pomerania. He was baptized Johann to commemorate his grandfather King John of Bohemia. At the age of three, he was given the titles of a margrave of Moravia and Brandenburg, however, these lands were actually ruled by his uncle John Henry and his elder half-brother Wenceslaus.

In 1377, one year before his death, Emperor Charles IV provided for his younger son the bailiwick of Görlitz in the Bohemian crown land of Upper Lusatia, which he raised to a duchy in its own right. John's ducal lands also comprised the eastern areas of adjacent Lower Lusatia and southern parts of the Brandenburg Neumark territory. John remained the first and only duke (Herzog) of this newly established duchy. He was raised at the Praguel court under the tutelage of his elder half-brother Wenceslaus, elected King of the Romans in 1376 and Charles' successor on the Bohemian throne in 1378. Coming of age, he took his residence in Görlitz, then a prosperous city and member of the Lusatian League.

In 1385 King Wenceslaus consigned him administration of Brandenburg, then formally under the rule of John's half-brother Sigismund and given in pawn to their cousin Margrave Jobst of Moravia three years later. Between 1386 and 1388, he was also administrator of the Duchy of Luxembourg. In his Görlitz duchy, John turned out to be a capable rule. After pogroms in Prague in 1389, however, he issued a decree expelling the Jews, contrary to the privilege granted to the Jews in the neighbouring Bautzen (Budissin) area by bailiff Beneš Berka of Dubá in 1383. His chancellor and closest confidant during his entire reign was Olbram of Škvorec, the Archbishop of Prague.

Duke John remained a loyal supporter of King Wenceslaus, whose position in the Empire increasingly attenuated. During the Second Margrave War in 1394, Wenceslaus was arrested by his cousin Jobst of Moravia and kept prisoner (8 May - 1 August) in Austria, he was only set free after John occupied Prague, raised an army at Kutná Hora (Kuttenberg), and campaigned the lands of the insurgent Rosenberg family to intervene for his brother. Wenceslaus was finally released after he signed a treaty in benefice of the German princes and returned to Bohemia. Left without any reward for his loyalty, John soon after turned away from Wenceslaus and retired to his Görlitz duchy.

== Marriage and issue ==
Modern sarcophagus of John, Duke of Görlitz

On 10 February 1388 in Prague, John married Richardis Catherine (died 1400), a daughter of Duke Albert III of Mecklenburg, who ruled as King of Sweden from 1364 to 1389. Their only child was a daughter, Elizabeth of Görlitz (1390–1451), Duchess of Luxembourg upon the death of Jobst of Moravia in 1411, who married firstly, in 1409, Duke Anthony of Brabant (1384–1415) and after his death, in 1418 the Wittelsbach duke John III of Bavaria.

John died suddenly at the age of 25, probably poisoned, while he stayed at Neuzelle Abbey in Lower Lusatia. After his death, his duchy was dissolved and the pre-1377 borders were restored.
