= Elizabeth of Pomerania =

Holy Roman Empress from 1363 to 1378

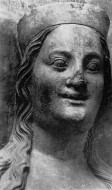
- Elisabeth of Pomerania

Holy Roman Empress Queen consort of Germany and Bohemia
- Tenure: 1363–1378
- Coronation: 1 November 1368
- Born: 1347
- Died: 15 April 1393 (aged 45–46); Hradec Králové
- Burial: St. Vitus Cathedral, Prague
- Spouse: Charles IV, Holy Roman Emperor (m. 1363; died 1378)
- Issue: Anne, Queen of England; Sigismund, Holy Roman Emperor; John, Duke of Görlitz; Margaret, Burgravine of Nuremberg
- House: House of Griffin
- Father: Bogislaw V, Duke of Pomerania
- Mother: Elisabeth of Poland

Elizabeth of Pomerania (Polish: Elżbieta pomorska, Czech: Eliška Pomořanská; c. 1347 – 15 April 1393) was the fourth and last wife of Charles IV, Holy Roman Emperor, and King of Bohemia.

== Life ==
Elizabeth was the daughter of Bogislaw V, Duke of Pomerania, and Elisabeth of Poland. Her maternal grandparents were Casimir III, King of Poland, and Aldona of Lithuania. Elizabeth married Charles on 25 May 1363 in Kraków, only one year after the death of Charles's third wife, Anne of Schweidnitz. The bride was 16 years old, while the groom was 47. Charles married Elisabeth mainly for a diplomatic reason, as the marriage helped to break the anti-Czech coalition led by Rudolf IV, Duke of Austria, with Polish and Hungarian kings as participants. On 18 June 1363 in the Bohemian capital Prague, Elisabeth was crowned Queen of Bohemia, and 5 years later, on 1 November 1368, she was also crowned empress of the Holy Roman Empire in Rome by Pope Urban V.

They had:

- Anne of Bohemia (1366–1394), married Richard II of England
- Sigismund (1368–1437), Holy Roman Emperor and King of Bohemia and Hungary, Charles's successor.
- John of Görlitz (1370–1396), margrave of Moravia and duke of Görlitz, who married Richardis Catherine of Sweden
- Charles (13 March 1372 – 24 July 1373)
- Margaret of Bohemia (1373–1410), who was married to John III, Burgrave of Nuremberg
- Henry (1377–1378)

== Queen and empress ==
Elizabeth is reputed to have been a very vigorous, self-confident and physically strong person. The relationship between her and Charles is described to have been good and harmonious. During the serious illness of Charles in 1371, Elisabeth made a miniature pilgrimage by walking on foot to the cathedral and offering gifts in a prayer to his health. Their good relationship has been portrayed in art, such as in Noc na Karlštejně (A Night at Karlstein). She did not seem to have wielded any political influence. However, she was tormented by the fact that Charles preferred his children from his former marriage, but was unable to change his mind.

== Widowhood ==
Modern sarcophagus of the wives of Charles IV in St. Vitus Cathedral in Prague

After her husband's death on 29 November 1378 in Prague, Elizabeth's stepson Wenceslaus IV, son of Charles's previous wife, ascended the throne. Elizabeth then cared for her own two sons, mainly the older Sigismund, whom she supported in his efforts to become the king of Hungary.

Elizabeth outlived Charles IV by 15 years. She died on 15 February 1393 in Hradec Králové (Königgrätz) and was buried next to her husband in St. Vitus Cathedral.

== Sources ==
- Boehm, Barbara Drake; Fajt, Jiri, eds. (2005). Prague: The Crown of Bohemia, 1347-1437. Yale University Press.
- Frost, Robert I. (2015). The Making of the Polish-Lithuanian Union 1385-1569. Vol. 1. Oxford University Press.
- Rapelli, Paola (2011). Symbols of Power in Art. The J. Paul Getty Museum.
- Staley, Lynn (2020). Following Chaucer: Offices of the Active Life. University of Michigan Press.
- Warner, Kathryn (2017). Richard II: A True King's Fall. Amberley Publishing.
- Žurek, Václav (2022). "The Coronations of Bohemian Kings and Queens". In Šmahel, František; Nodl, Martin; Žurek, Václav (eds.). Festivities, Ceremonies, and Rituals in the Lands of the Bohemian Crown in the Late Middle Ages. Brill. pp. 9–52.

Royal titles
Vacant Title last held by Anna von Schweidnitz	Queen consort of Bohemia and Germany; 1363–1378	Succeeded by Joanna of Bavaria
Vacant Title last held by Anna von Schweidnitz	Holy Roman Empress; 1363–1378	Vacant Title next held by Barbara of Celje
