= Margaret of Bohemia, Queen of Hungary =

Margaret of Bohemia

Queen consort of Hungary
- Tenure: 1342–1349
- Born: 24 May 1335
- Died: 1349 (aged 13–14)
- Spouse: Louis I of Hungary
- House: Luxembourg
- Father: Charles IV, Holy Roman Emperor
- Mother: Blanche of Valois

Margaret of Bohemia (24 May 1335 – 1349, before October), also known as Margaret of Luxembourg, was a Queen consort of Hungary by her marriage to Louis I of Hungary. She was the second child of Charles IV, Holy Roman Emperor, and his first wife Blanche of Valois. She was a member of the House of Luxembourg.

== Life ==
Margaret was the second child of her father's first marriage. She was betrothed at the age of two to Amadeus VI, Count of Savoy, the contract being signed on 7 March 1338. The contract was, however, broken and Amadeus married Margaret's cousin, Bonne of Bourbon.

At the age of seven, Margaret was married in 1342 to Louis I of Hungary.

The marriage lasted seven years and no children were born of the union, probably because of Margaret's young age. She died in 1349 while still a minor, aged around fourteen, and was probably buried in Székesfehérvár Basilica. She had outlived her mother, Blanche, by only one year. Her husband remarried four years later to Elizabeth of Bosnia.

== Notes ==
Margaret of Bohemia, Queen of Hungary Luxembourg dynasty Born: 1335 Died: 1349
Royal titles
Vacant Title last held by Elizabeth of Poland	Queen consort of Hungary; 1342–1349	Vacant Title next held by Elizabeth of Bosnia
