= Anne of Bavaria =

Queen of Germany and Bohemia from 1349 to 1353

Anna of Bavaria
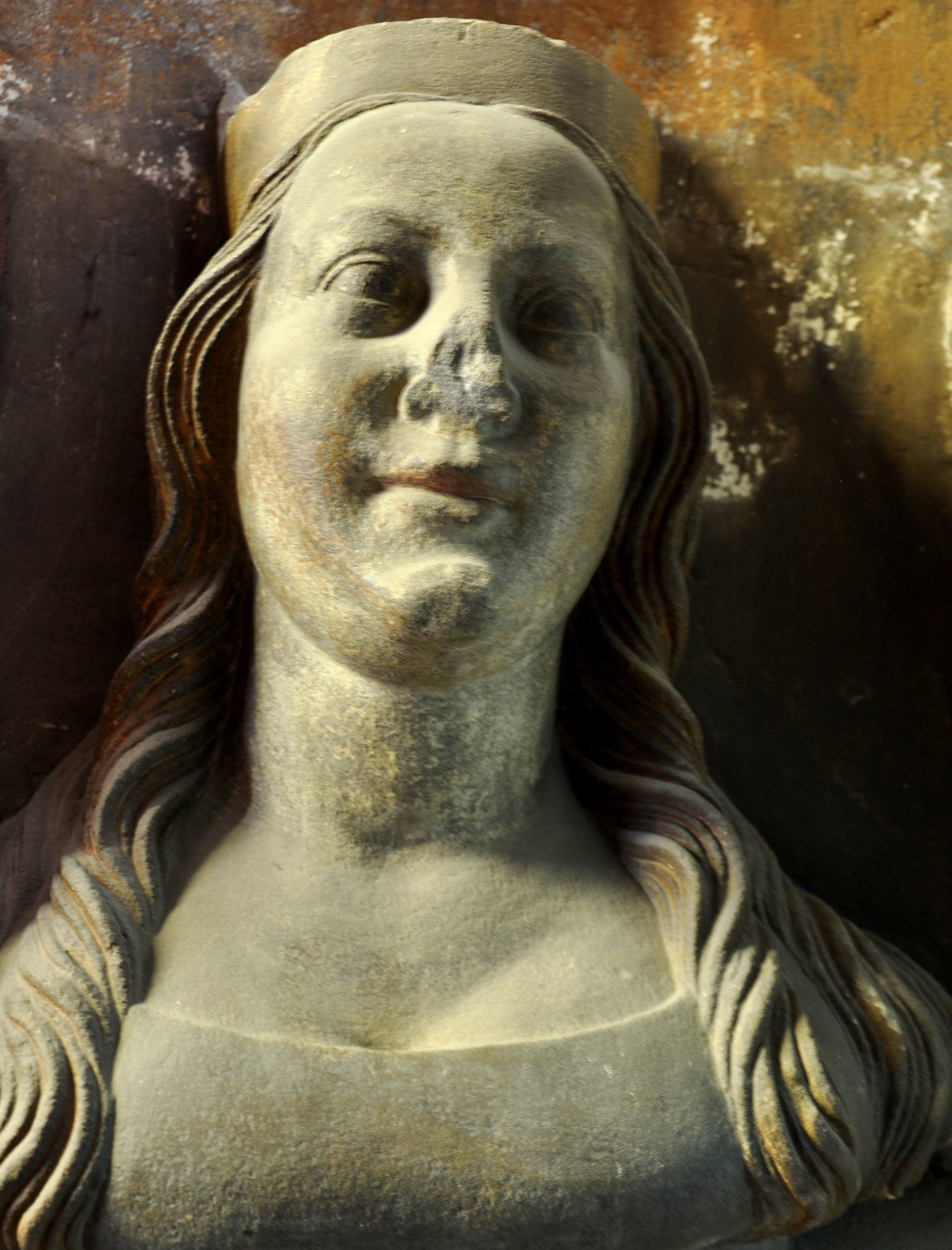

Queen consort of Germany and Bohemia
- Tenure: 1349–1353
- Coronation: 26 July 1349 (Germany); 1 September 1349 (Bohemia)
- Born: 26 September 1329
- Died: 2 February 1353 (aged 23)
- Spouse: Charles IV, Holy Roman Emperor (m. 1349)
- Issue: Wenceslaus
- House: Wittelsbach
- Father: Rudolf II, Count Palatine of the Rhine
- Mother: Anne of Tirol

Anne of Bavaria (or of the Palatinate; Czech: Anna Falcká; 26 September 1329 – 2 February 1353) was Queen of Bohemia by marriage to Charles of Luxembourg. She was the daughter of Rudolf II, Count Palatine of the Rhine, and Anna, daughter of Otto III of Carinthia.

== Life ==
Modern sarcophagus of the wives of Charles IV in St. Vitus Cathedral in Prague

Anna was a member of the House of Wittelsbach. She married Holy Roman Emperor Charles IV on 11 March 1349 in the town of Bacharach on the Rhine. She became the second wife of Charles after the death of his first wife, Blanche of Valois, in 1348. On 26 July 1349 in Aachen, Anna was crowned Queen of Rome. Months later she was crowned Queen of Bohemia. In 1350, Anna gave birth to a son, Wenceslaus, who died one year later, in 1351. Anna did not have more children and died herself in 1353 at the age of 23. Charles was widowed for a second time and still had no son. He then married Anna von Schweidnitz, who gave birth to the desired heir, Wenceslaus, King of the Romans.

== Asteroid ==
Asteroid 100733 Annafalcká, discovered by Czech astronomer Miloš Tichý at the Kleť Observatory in 1998, was named in her memory. The official naming citation was published by the Minor Planet Center on 12 January 2017 (M.P.C. 103026).

== Ancestors ==
Ancestors of Anne of Bavaria

8. Louis II, Duke of Bavaria
4. Rudolf I, Duke of Bavaria
9. Matilda of Habsburg
2. Rudolf II, Count Palatine of the Rhine
10. Adolf, King of the Romans
5. Mechtild of Nassau
11. Imagina of Isenburg-Limburg
1. Anne of Bavaria
12. Meinhard, Duke of Carinthia
6. Otto III of Carinthia
13. Elizabeth of Bavaria
3. Anne of Carinthia
14. Henry V, Duke of Legnica
7. Euphemia of Legnica
15. Elisabeth of Kalisz

Royal titles
Vacant Title last held by Blanche of Valois	Queen consort of Germany and Bohemia; 1349–1353	Vacant Title next held by Anna von Schweidnitz
