= The Crown of the Kings =

- Also known as: The Crown of the Kings. The Jagiellonians (since season 4)
- Genre: Historical Drama
- Written by: Ilona Łepkowska; Jan Piotr Szafraniec; Agnieszka Olejnik; Monika Zięba-Rybkowska; Małgorzata Jurczak; Dariusz Banek; Ewelina Chyrzyńska; Klara Kawka; Ewa Bulanda
- Directed by: Wojciech Pacyna; Jacek Sołtysiak; Jerzy Krysiak
- Starring: Mateusz Król; Marta Bryła; Halina Łabonarska; Katarzyna Czapla; Andrzej Hausner; Aleksandra Przesław; Andrzej Popiel; Ewelina Pankowska; Kamil Siegmund; Dagmara Bryzek; Vasyl Vasylyk; Antoni Sałaj; Zbigniew Suszyński; Grażyna Szapołowska; Sebastian Skoczeń; Milena Staszuk; Karolina Porcari; Michał Chorosiński; Agnieszka Wagner; Michał Chruściel; Maria Pawłowska; Maja Szopa
- Composer: Marcin Przybyłowicz
- Country of origin: Poland
- Original languages: Polish; Lithuanian; Hungarian
- No. of seasons: 5
- No. of episodes: 650

Production
- Running time: 25-29 min.
- Production company: TVP

Original release
- Network: TVP1
- Release: 1 January 2018 – 17 December 2024

Related
- Kings (2024–2025)

The Crown of the Kings (Polish: Korona królów) is a Polish historical soap opera. Aired from January 1, 2018, on TVP1. The show is a biographical story about the reign of: King Casimir III the Great (seasons 1–2), Queen Jadwiga and King Władysław II Jagiełło as co-rulers (season 3), and then Jagiełło as the sole ruler (seasons 4–5) of the Kingdom of Poland. The series tells the story of the monarchy in Poland in the 14th and 15th century.

== Plot ==
=== Season 1 ===
The first season depicts events from 1325–1339, showing the last years of King Władysław the Elbow-high's reign and the beginnings of the rule of King Casimir the Great. It focuses on his first marriage with Queen Aldona Anna of Lithuania and relationship with mother - Queen Hedvig of Kalisz. Season ends in 1339, the year of death of Aldona and Hedvig.

=== Season 2 ===
The second season starts three years after events of first season's finale and shows events from years 1342–1370. It shows the threads of three castles: Wawel, Visegrad and Świdnica. The story of King Casimir III the Great and his second wife Queen Adelaide of Hesse, is extended of threads of his sister - Elizabeth of Poland, Queen of Hungary, her son King Louis the Great and his nephew - Duke Bolko II the Small, his wife Agnes von Habsburg and niece Anna of Świdnica, future empress. Season shows also bigamic marriages of Casimir with Christina Rokiczana and Hedwig of Sagan, during Queen Adelaide's life. The action of the final episode takes place in 1374, four years after Casimir's death, when Jadwiga of Poland is born.

=== Season 3 ===
The third season depicts the life of Saint Jadwiga of Poland and covers 1376–1399. The action begins at the turn of 1376 and 1377 during the reign of Louis I of Hungary. The last years of his reign are shown, as well as the last moments of regency of his mother Queen Elizabeth in the Kingdom of Poland. The season explores the life and reign of Queen Jadwiga of Anjou, crowned King of Poland in 1384. One of the main threads is her relationship with Prince William Courteous of Austria and marriage with the Lithuanian Grand Duke Jogaiła. Season ends with death of Queen Jadwiga, three weeks after childbirth. In the final episode her and her baby daughter's funeral is shown.

=== Season 4 (The Jagiellonians – season 1) ===
The fourth season covers 1399–1420, it begins two months after the death of Queen Jadwiga, when the bereaved Jogaila considers returning to Lithuania. Polish nobles allow him to stay on the Polish throne after his wife's death on condition that he marries her cousin Anna of Cilli, granddaughter of Casimir the Great. The marriage is stormy at first, but over time love grows between the king and Anna. The royal couple's only daughter is named Hedvig in honour of Queen Jadwiga. The season also portrays Jogaila's relations with his cousin Vytautas, Grand Duke of Lithuania and rebellious brother Svitrigaila, as well as the growing conflict with the Teutonic Order, leading to the Battle of Grunwald in 1410 and the King's love marriage with widowed Elizabeth Granowska with her death marking the season finale.

=== Season 5 (The Jagiellonians – season 2) ===
The fifth season focuses on the final years of King Jogaila and his fourth and last marriage to Sophia of Halshany.

== Series overview ==
Season		Title	Episodes		Season premiere	Season finale	TV Channel
1		The Crown of the Kings	84		January 1, 2018	May 22, 2018	TVP1
2		The Crown of the Kings	161		September 3, 2018	June 25, 2019	TVP1
3		The Crown of the Kings	155	131	September 9, 2019	May 1, 2020	TVP1
3		The Crown of the Kings	155	24	August 31, 2020	October 8, 2020	TVP1
4	1	The Crown of the Kings. The Jagiellonians	125	65	January 2, 2023	May 31, 2023	TVP1
4	1	The Crown of the Kings. The Jagiellonians	125	60	August 28, 2023	January 30, 2024	TVP1
5	2	The Crown of the Kings. The Jagiellonians	125		January 31, 2024	June 13, 2024	TVP1
5	2	The Crown of the Kings. The Jagiellonians	125		August 12, 2024	December 17, 2024	TVP1

== Special episodes ==
Korona królów: Od księcia do króla (The Crown of Kings: From Prince to King) is a special 25-minute episode of the series. He will explore the mystery of gaining power by Kazimierz. This episode is a summary of the events of the first series of the series - from the engagement of Kazimierz Anna to the moment of his mother's death Jadwiga. This episode will premiere on May 24, 2018 (Thursday), the day after the premiere of the first series issue.

Korona królów: Taka historia... (The Crown of Kings: Such a story ...) is a program that shows the story behind the creation of the series, as well as aimed at historical education. The premiere episodes are announced for Fridays at 18.30, starting from September 7, 2018, i.e. after the first week of the broadcast of the second season of the series

== Characters and Cast ==
=== Main cast ===
- Mateusz Król (season 1) and Andrzej Hausner (season 2, guest season 3) as King Casimir III the Great
- Marta Bryła as Queen Aldona of Lithuania (season 1, guest season 2)
- Halina Łabonarska as Queen Hedwig of Kalisz (season 1, guest seasons 2–3)
- Katarzyna Czapla as Elizabeth of Poland, Queen of Hungary (seasons 1–3)
- Aleksandra Przesław as Queen Adelaide of Hesse (season 2)
- Dagmara Bryzek as Saint Queen Jadwiga of Poland (season 3, guest season 4)
- Vasyl Vasylyk (season 3) and Sebastian Skoczeń (seasons 4–5) as King Władysław II Jagiełło
- Milena Staszuk as Queen Anne of Cilli (season 4, guest season 5)
- Karolina Chapko (season 3) and Karolina Porcari (season 4, guest season 5) as Queen Elizabeth Granowska
- Maria Pawłowska as Queen Sophia of Halshany (season 5)
- Wiktor Bałtaki as King Władysław III of Poland (season 5)

=== Royal Family ===
==== House of Piast ====
- Wiesław Wójcik as King Władysław I the Elbow-high (season 1, guest season 2)
- Anna Grycewicz as Princess Kunigunde, Duchess of Świdnica (season 1, guest season 2)
- Marta Wiśniewska as Princess Elizabeth (season 2)
  - Julia Młynarczyk as toddler Princess Elizabeth (season 1)
  - Gabriela Świerszczyńska as child Princess Elizabeth (season 1)
- Martyna Dudek as Princess Cunigunde (season 2)
  - Wiktoria Zembrzycka as toddler Princess Cunigunde (season 1)
  - Emilia Rostek as child Princess Cunigunde (season 1)
- Krzysztof Rogucki as Duke Casimir "Kaźko" IV of Pomerania (season 2)
  - Miłosz Kwiecień as child Duke Casimir "Kaźko" IV of Pomerania (season 2)
- Andrzej Popiel as Duke Bolko II the Small (seasons 1–2)
- Ewelina Pankowska as Princess Agnes of Austria, Duchess of Świdnica (seasons 1–2)
- Michał Wolny as Duke Henry II of Świdnica (season 2)
- Julia Gawrysiak as Empress Anna of Świdnica (season 2)
- Natalia Wolska as toddler Anna of Świdnica (season 2)
- Dorota Kuduk as Duchess Constance of Świdnica (season 1)
- Przemysław Furdak as Duke Henry V of Sagan (season 2)
- Aleksandra Nowosadko as Queen Hedwig of Sagan (season 2)
- Zbigniew Suszyński as Duke Władysław of Opole (season 3)
- Grażyna Szapołowska as Duchess Eufemia of Masovia (season 3)
- Jakub Szlachetka as Duke Siemowit V of Mazovia (season 4)
- Aniela Pudowska as Princess Cymburgis of Mazovia (season 4)
- Maria Gładkowska as Duchess Anna of Teck (season 4)

==== House of Anjou ====
- Jan Krzysztof Szczygieł as King Charles I Robert of Hungary (season 1)
- Kamil Siegmund as King Louis the Great (seasons 2–3)
  - Jan Hrynkiewicz as young King Louis (season 2)
  - Filip Dziwiszek as child Prince Louis (season 1)
  - Filip Pilarski as child Prince Louis (season 2)
- Małgorzata Buczkowska as Queen Elizabeth of Bosnia (season 3)
- Olga Madejska as Mary, Queen of Hungary (season 3)
- Justyna Zielska as adolescent Mary (season 3)
- Nadia Gałzińska as child Mary (season 3)
- Antonina Litwiniak as Princess Catherine of Anjou (season 3)
- Bartłomiej Zieliński as Prince Andrew, Duke of Calabria (season 1)
- Filip Dziwiszek as Prince Stephen of Anjou (season 2)
  - Wiktor Benicki as toddler Prince Stephen of Anjeou (season 1)

==== House of Habsburgs ====
- Kacper Gaduła-Zawratyński as Duke William, Duke of Austria (season 3)
  - Antoni Zakowicz as adolescent William (season 3)
  - Bruno Tomczyk as child William (season 3)
- Wojciech Niemczyk as Duke Leopold III, Duke of Austria (season 3)
- Patrycja Soliman as Duchess Viridis Visconti (season 3)

==== House of Gediminids ====
- Bohdan Graczyk as Grand Duke of Lithuania, Giedyminas. (season 1)
- Wojciech Żołądkowicz as Duke Algirdas of Lithuania (seasons 1–3)
- Dorota Naruszewicz as Duchess Julianna of Tver, Grand Duchess of Lithuania (season 3)
- Jakub Mazurek as Duke Kęstutis of Lithuania (seasons 1–3)
- Ihor Aronov (season 3) and Michał Chorosiński (seasons 4–5) as Duke Vytautas
- Antoni Sałaj as Duke Skirgaila (season 3)
- Anya Zalevskaya as Princess Mary of Lithuania (season 3)
- Agnieszka Wagner as Duchess Alexandra (seasons 4–5)
- TBA as Vaidila (season 3)
- Emma Giegżno as Princess Alexandra of Lithuania (season 3) and Princess Julianna of Halshany, Grand Duchess of Lithuania (seasons 4–5)
- Adrianna Kućmierz (season 3) and Małgorzata Klara (season 4) as Anna, Grand Duchess of Lithuania

==== House of Luxembourgs ====
- Saniwoj Król as King John I of Bohemia (season 1) / King Charles IV, Holy Romany Emperor (season 2)
- Jan Marczewski as King Charles IV, Holy Romany Emperor (season 1)
- Dominik Mirecki (season 3) and Wojan Trocki (seasons 4–5) as King Sigismund of Luxembourg, Holy Roman Emperor
- Maksymilian Dobrowolski as adolescent Sigismund (season 3)
- Marta Jarczewska as Queen Barbara of Cilli (seasons 4–5)

=== Castle officials, nobility and knights ===
- Paulina Lasota as Cudka (seasons 1–2)
- Joanna Kwiatkowska-Zduń as Cudka (season 3)
  - Marcelina Chlebna as child Cudka (season 1)
- Adrian Brząkała as Pełka, Cudka's Son (season 3)
- Karol Czajkowski as Niemierza, Cudka's Son (season 3)
- Michalina Sosna as Christine of Rokiczan (season 2)
- Anna Terpiłowska as Estera, King Casimir the Great's lover (seasons 2–3)
- Sławomir Orzeszowski as Spycimir Leliwita, Castellan of Cracow (seasons 1–2)
- Tomasz Sapryk as Chancellor Zbigniew (seasons 1–2)
- Marcin Rogacewicz as Jaśko from Melsztyn, knight and Castellan of Cracow (seasons 1–3)
- Aleksander Kaleta as Spytko II from Melsztyn, Castellan of Cracow (season 3)
- Robert Gonera as Bishop of Cracow, Jan Grot (seasons 1–2)
- Artur Dziurman as Bishop of Cracow Jan Bodzęta (season 2)
- Grzegorz Wons as Marcin from Rajsk (seasons 2–3).
- Agnieszka Mandat as Katarzyna Pilecka (seasons 1–2)
- Adam Bobik as Monk Wojciech, Queen Aldona and Adelaide's confessor (seasons 1–3)
- Wenanty Nosul as Eljasz, monk and medical (seasons 1–2)
- Violetta Arlak as Bożena Tęczyńska, Jan Grot's cousin (seasons 1–2)
- Andrzej Deskur as Archbishop of Gniezno Jarosław Bogoria (seasons 1–2)
- Krzysztof Wrona as Pełka from Sieciechowo, Castellan of Kalisz (seasons 1–2)
- Piotr Gawron-Jedlikowski as Niemierza from Gołcza (seasons 1–2)
- Marcin Rudziński as Archbishop of Gniezno Janisław (season 1)
- Piot Ligenza as Mikołaj Ligęza, cupbearer (seasons 1–2)
- Jacek Kopczyński as Grzegorz Nekanda (season 1)
- Miron Jagniewski as Paszek, Grot's secretary (seasons 1–2)
- Paulina Kondrak as Jagna (seasons 1–2)
- Leszek Zdun as Janko from Czarnków (season 2)
- Paweł Janyst as Janusz Suchywilk (seasons 2–3)
- Marianna Zydek as Małogorzata Tęczyńska (seasons 1–2)
- Jan Dravnel as Edmundas, Algirdas' knight (season 1)
- Sławomir Holland as Jan Ligęza, cupbearer (season 1)
- Jakub Mróz as Giovanni (season 1)
- Mateusz Kmiecik as Idzi, Cupbearer (seasons 1–2)
- Wiktoria Wolańska as Ofka, Jaśko from Melsztyn's wife (seasons 1–2)
- Izabela Noszczyk as Bogna, Ofka's aunt (seasons 1–2)
- Bartosz Adamczyk as Adam (season 2)
- Rafał Szałajko as Wacław from Balice (season 2)
- Bartłomiej Cabaj as Andrzej from Tęczyn (season 2)
- Maciej Robakiewicz as Adam from Książ (season 2)
- Maciej Grzybowski as Władysław from Wilhelmowo (season 2)
- Ziemowit Wasilewski as Cupbearer Zygfryd (season 2)
- Zbigniew Dziduch as Beniamin from Kołdręb (season 2)
- Wojciech Dmochowski as Błażej from Rajsk (season 2)
- Paweł Caban as Michał from Czacz (season 2)
- Łukasz Mazurek as Priest Marcin Baryczka (season 2)
- Michał Lewandowski as Imperial Knight Hasso Wedel (season 2)
- Jacek Ryś as Maciej Borkowic (season 2)
- Arkadiusz Cyran as Bishop of Cracow Jan Radlica (season 3)
- Piotr Dąbrowski as Archbishop of Gniezno Jan Bodzanta (season 3)
- Arkadiusz Detmer as Przedbor of Brzezie (season 3)
- Andrzej Musiał as Sędziwój of Szubin (season 3)
- Andrzej Mastalerz as Dymitr of Goraj (season 3)
- Aleksandra Nieśpielak as Felicja (season 3)
- Gabriela Całun as Jadwiga Pilecka from Melsztyn (season 3)
- TBA as Jan of Tarnów (season 3)
- Jakub Głukowski (season 3) and Marek Lis-Orłowski (season 4) as Jan of Tęczyn
- Krzysztof Wach (season 3) and Lech Mackiewicz (season 4) as Bishop of Cracow Piotr Wysz
- Marcin Włodarski (season 3) and Radosław Pazura (seasons 4–5) as Archbishop Mikolaj Trąba
- Daniel Mosior as Bishop Stanisław Ciołek (seasons 4–5)
- Robert Jarocinski as Zawisza the Black (seasons 4–5)
- Maciej Raniszewski as Zyndram (season 4)
- Kacper Młynarkiewicz as Sambor (seasons 4–5)
- Krzysztof Brzazgoń as Grzymek of Cieślin (seasons 4–5)
- Marcel Opaliński as Jakub of Kobylany (season 4)
- Aldona Orman as Hanna Kobylańska (season 4)
- Filip Grycmacher as Mikołaj of Chrząstów (season 4)
- Jakub Strach as Pietrek (season 4)
- Przemysław Stippa as Archbishop Zbigniew Oleśnicki (seasons 4–5)
- Arkadiusz Janeczek as Archbishop Wojciech Jastrzębiec (seasons 4–5)

=== Castle servants ===
- Małgorzata Kozłowska as Margit, Queen Jawiga's Maidservant (season 3)
- Emma Herdzik as Queen Jadwiga's Maidservant Elizabeth Lackfi (season 3)
- Karina Seweryn as Egle, servant of Queen Aldona Anna. (seasons 1–2)
- Agata Bykowska as Gabija, Lithuanian cook (seasons 1–2)
- Karolina Kominek as Queen Adelaide's Maidservant Oda (season 2)
- Hanna Wojak as Queen Adelaide's Maidservant Jutta (season 2)
- Zofia Schwinke as Queen Elizabeth's Maidservant Ilona (seasons 2–3)
- Paulina Masiak as Duchess Agnes' Maidervant Ilza (season 2)
- Ilona Korycka as Maidserwant Halszka (season 1)
- Dagmara Bąk as Maiderwant Helena, served Queen Anna, then Duchess Agnieszka. (seasons 1–2)
- Kinga Jasik as Helena Reibnitz (season 3)
- Magda Groszek as child Helena (season 2)
- Aleksandra Ciejek as Maidservant Manita (season 2)
- Helena Chorzelska as Servant Weronika (season 2)
- Beata Chyczewska as Queen Elizabeth's Maidservant Klara Pukar (seasons 2-2)
- Monika Domowicz as Queen Elizabeth's Maidservant Anda (seasons 1–3)
- Dagmara Brodziak as Servant Femka (seasons 1–2)
- Renata Berger as Maidserwent Stanisława (season 1)
- Dominika Kryszczńska as Machna (season 1)
- Mirosław Kupiec as Magister Cuinae (season 1)
- Gabriela Chojecka as Egle's daughter Audre (seasons 1–2)
- Grzegorz Woś as Servant Śmil (seasons 1–2)
- Mirosław Jękot as Chef (seasons 1–2)
- Grzegorz Kowalczyk as Groom Rafał (seasons 1–2)
- Ryszard Jabłoński as Kitchen Boy Grzymek (seasons 2–3)
- Marcin Bubółka as Chitchen Boy Miłek (seasons 1–2)

=== Other characters ===
- Dorota Chotecka-Pazura as Regina (seasons 2–3)
- TBA as Urszula (season 3)
- Karolina Piechota as Vendor Rozalia (season 1)
- Bartłomiej Nowosielski as Potter Józef (season 1)
- Maurycy Popiel as Arunas Szymon (season 1)
- Zbigniew Waleryś as Innkeeper Samuel (seasons 1–2)
- Izabela Bujniewicz as Lenka (season 2)
- Aleksandra Grzelak as Barbara Dunin (season 1)
- Karolina Porcari as Bella (season 2)
- Natalia Lesz as Ragana (season 3)
- Jasper Sołtysiewicz as Gedko (season 1)
- Karol Zakrzewski as Witautas, Lithuanian trader (seasons 1–2)
- Mateusz Burdach as Bogdan (season 2)
- Jan Cięciara as Young Bogdan (season 1)
- Maciej Mikołajczyk as Stasiek from Wierzbin (seasons 1–2)
- Wojciech Starostecki as Trader Jarzynka (seasons 1–2)
- Dominik Bąk as Mszczuj (season 1)
- Jerzy Mazur as Maidservant Helena's father Przybysław (season 2)
- Paweł Tucholski as Guillaume de Machaut (season 2)
- Marek Prażnowski as Wierzynek (season 2)
- Kiril Denev as Eutryfon (season 2)
- Karol Drozd as Jan from Sącz (season 2)
- Marcin Kiszluk as King Peter I of Cyprus (season 2)
