= Elisabeth of Świdnica =

Elisabeth of Świdnica (ca. 1315 – 8/9 February 1348) was a member of the Piast dynasty in the Świdnica-Jawor branch and by marriage Duchess of Opole.

She was the third child but second daughter of Duke Bernard of Świdnica by his wife Kunigunde, daughter of Władysław I the Elbow-high, later King of Poland.

== Family ==
Elisabeth was the third of five children. Her brothers were: Bolko II the Small and Henry II of Świdnica. Elisabeth's eldest and only surviving sister was Constance; she was wife of Przemko II of Głogów. Elisabeth also had another sister, Beata; she died aged ten or eleven.

Elisabeth's brother, Henry married Katherine of Hungary. Their daughter was Anne of Świdnica, third wife of Charles IV, Holy Roman Emperor and mother of Wenceslaus, King of the Romans.

== Marriage ==
On 6 May 1326 and only eleven years old, Elisabeth married Duke Bolko II of Opole. Thanks to the marriage, Bolko II had a temporary close connection with the Polish King Władysław I the Elbow-high (paternal grandfather of his wife). However, this alliance was short-lived: on 5 April 1327 in Wrocław, he paid homage to King John of Bohemia; he was the last Silesian Duke who became vassal of Bohemia.

Bolko and Elisabeth had seven children:

1. Władysław Opolczyk (b. ca. 1332 - d. 18 May 1401).
2. Bolko III (b. ca. 1337 - d. 21 October 1382).
3. Henry (b. by 18 August 1338 - d. by 23 October 1365).
4. Kunigunde (b. 1340 - d. aft. 4 July 1372), a nun at St. Klara in Hungary (Alt-Buda).
5. Agnes (b. ca. 1341? - d. aft. 1 June 1390), Married Jobst of Moravia, but had no issue. Later became a nun at Stary Sącz.
6. Elisabeth (b. ca. 1342/47? - d. aft. 25 April 1382), a nun at Trzebnica.
7. Anna (b.ca. 1348? - d. aft. 12 March 1411), a nun at St. Klara at Wrocław.

All of their daughters became nuns. Their sons succeeded their father and took control of the duchies.

Elisabeth died in 1348, it is believed to have had something to do with the birth of her last child, Anna. Elisabeth left her husband a widower and he never remarried. Bolko died nine years after Elisabeth.
