= Yolanda of Hungary =

Yolanda of Hungary may refer to:

- Yolanda, Queen of Hungary (d. 1233)
- Violant of Hungary (1216-1253), Hungarian princess, Queen-Consort of Aragon
- Jolenta of Poland (1235-1298), Princess of Hungary, Duchess-Consort of Poland, saint
