= Kunigunde of Poland =

- Born: c. 1298
- Died: 9 April 1331
- Spouse: Bernard of Świdnica; Rudolf I, Duke of Saxe-Wittenberg
- Issue: Bolko II the Small; Henry II, Duke of Świdnica; Constance of Świdnica; Elisabeth of Świdnica; Beata of Świdnica
- House: House of Piast
- Father: Władysław I Łokietek
- Mother: Jadwiga of Kalisz

Kunigunde of Poland (Kunegunda) (c. 1298 – 9 April 1331) was a daughter of Władysław I the Elbow-high and his wife Jadwiga of Greater Poland. Her siblings included, Casimir III of Poland and Elisabeth, Queen of Hungary. She was a member of the House of Piast.

== Biography ==
Kunigunde's father was a bitter rival with Wenceslaus II of Bohemia who was King of Poland between 1291 and 1305. Life was dangerous for Kunigunde, her mother and her siblings during this time, she, her mother and two of her siblings had to go into hiding for a while during 1300. In 1305, Wenceslaus II died and was succeeded by his son, Wenceslaus III of Bohemia. Wenceslaus III reigned for a year before he was assassinated under mysterious circumstances so his campaign of Poland ended. His wife, Viola Elisabeth of Cieszyn had not bore him any children so his successor was Władysław.

In 1318, Władysław embarked on a coronation campaign. The pope, though initially unwilling, finally granted his approval and so Kunigunde's parents were crowned King and Queen of Poland on 30 January 1320 in Kraków.

=== Marriages ===
Kunigunde married Bernard of Świdnica, the couple had two sons and three daughters:

- Bolko II of Świdnica (d.1368), succeeded his father.
- Henry II of Świdnica (d.1348), succeeded his childless brother and was father of Anne of Świdnica, wife of Charles IV, Holy Roman Emperor.
- Constance of Świdnica, married to Przemko II of Głogów.
- Elisabeth of Świdnica, married to Bolko II of Opole.
- Beata of Świdnica, who died young.

Bernard died in 1326 and left Kunigunde a widow with their five children.

In 1328, Kunigunde remarried. Her second husband was Rudolf I, Duke of Saxe-Wittenberg. The marriage produced one son, Mieszko (b. ca. 1330 - d. 1350). Kunigunde died in 1333. Rudolf I remarried and in 1355 was proclaimed Elector of Saxony, one year before his own death.

== Ancestry ==
Ancestors of Kunigunde of Poland

16. Casimir II the Just
8. Konrad I of Masovia
17. Helena of Znojmo
4. Casimir I of Kuyavia
18. Svyatoslav III Igorevich
9. Agafia of Rus
19. Yaroslava Yurikovna
2. Władysław I Łokietek
20. Mieszko IV Tanglefoot
10. Casimir I of Opole
21. Ludmila
5. Euphrosyne of Opole
11. Viola
1. Kunigunde of Poland
24. Odon of Poznań
12. Władysław Odonic
25. Viacheslava Yaroslavna of Halych
6. Bolesław the Pious
13. Jadwiga
3. Jadwiga of Kalisz
28. Andrew II of Hungary
14. Béla IV of Hungary
29. Gertrude of Merania
7. Yolanda of Poland
30. Theodore I Laskaris
15. Maria Laskarina
31. Anna Komnene Angelina

== In popular culture ==
=== Film ===
Duchess Kunigunde is played by Anna Grycewicz in Polish historical drama TV series "Korona królów" ("The Crown of the Kings"). She is a recurring character in the first season.
