= Henry I of Jawor =

- Duke of Jawor
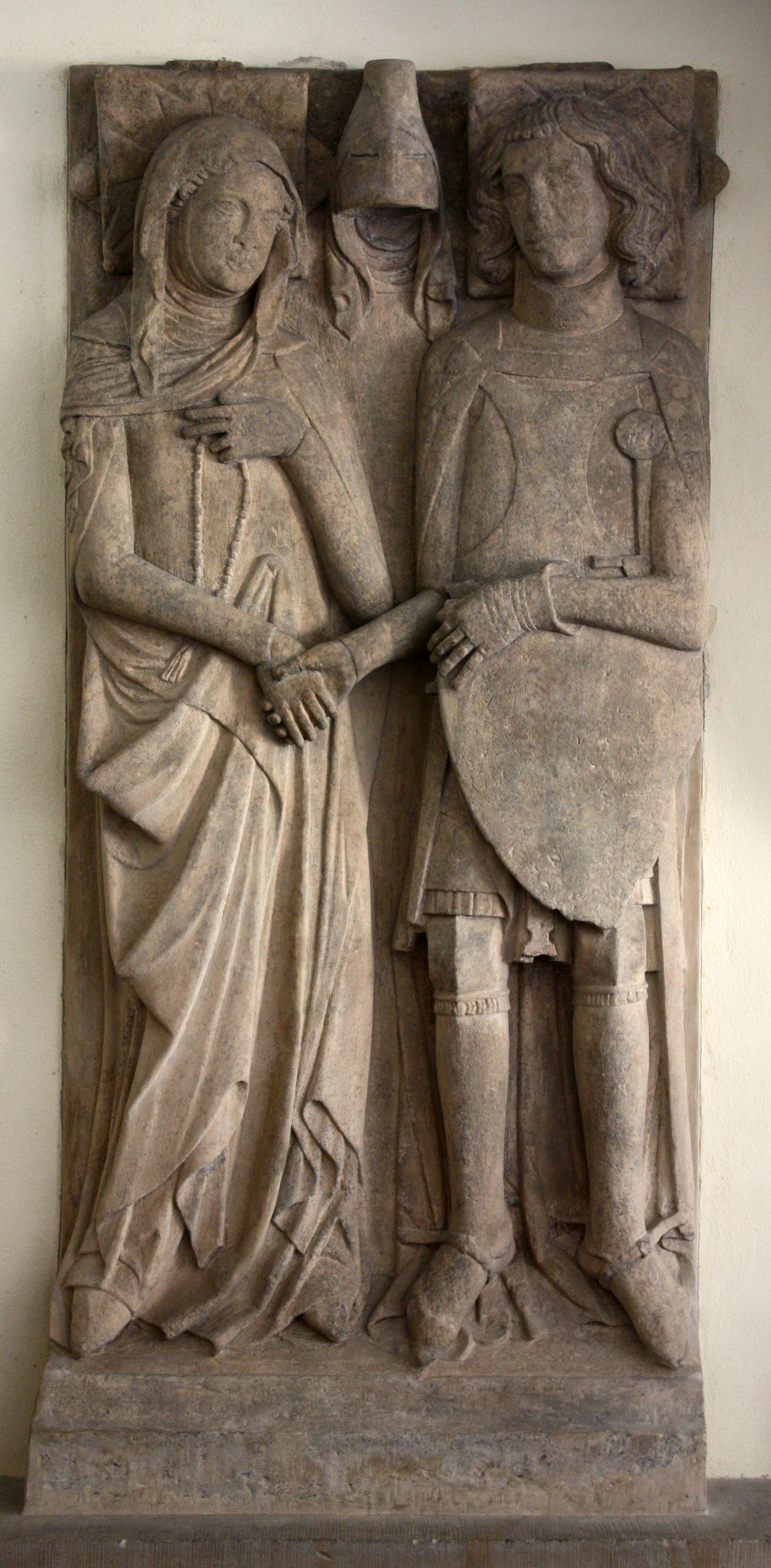
- Silver tombstone conserved in Lwówek Śląski, possibly representing Duke Henry I and his wife Agnes
- Born: c. 1292/96
- Died: 15 May 1346
- Buried: Lwówek Śląski
- Noble family: Silesian Piasts
- Spouse: Agnes of Bohemia, Duchess of Jawor
- Father: Bolko I the Strict
- Mother: Beatrice of Brandenburg

Henry I of Jawor (Polish: Henryk I. Jaworski, German: Heinrich I. von Jauer; c. 1292/1296 – 15 May 1346), was a duke of Jawor-Lwówek-Świdnica-Ziębice during 1301–1312 (with his brothers as co-rulers), sole Duke of Jawor-Lwówek since 1312 and Duke of Głogów since 1337 until his death.

He was the third son of Bolko I the Strict, Duke of Jawor-Lwówek-Świdnica-Ziębice, by his wife Beatrice of Brandenburg, daughter of Otto V, Margrave of Brandenburg-Salzwedel, Margraviate of Brandenburg-Salzwedel.

== Life ==
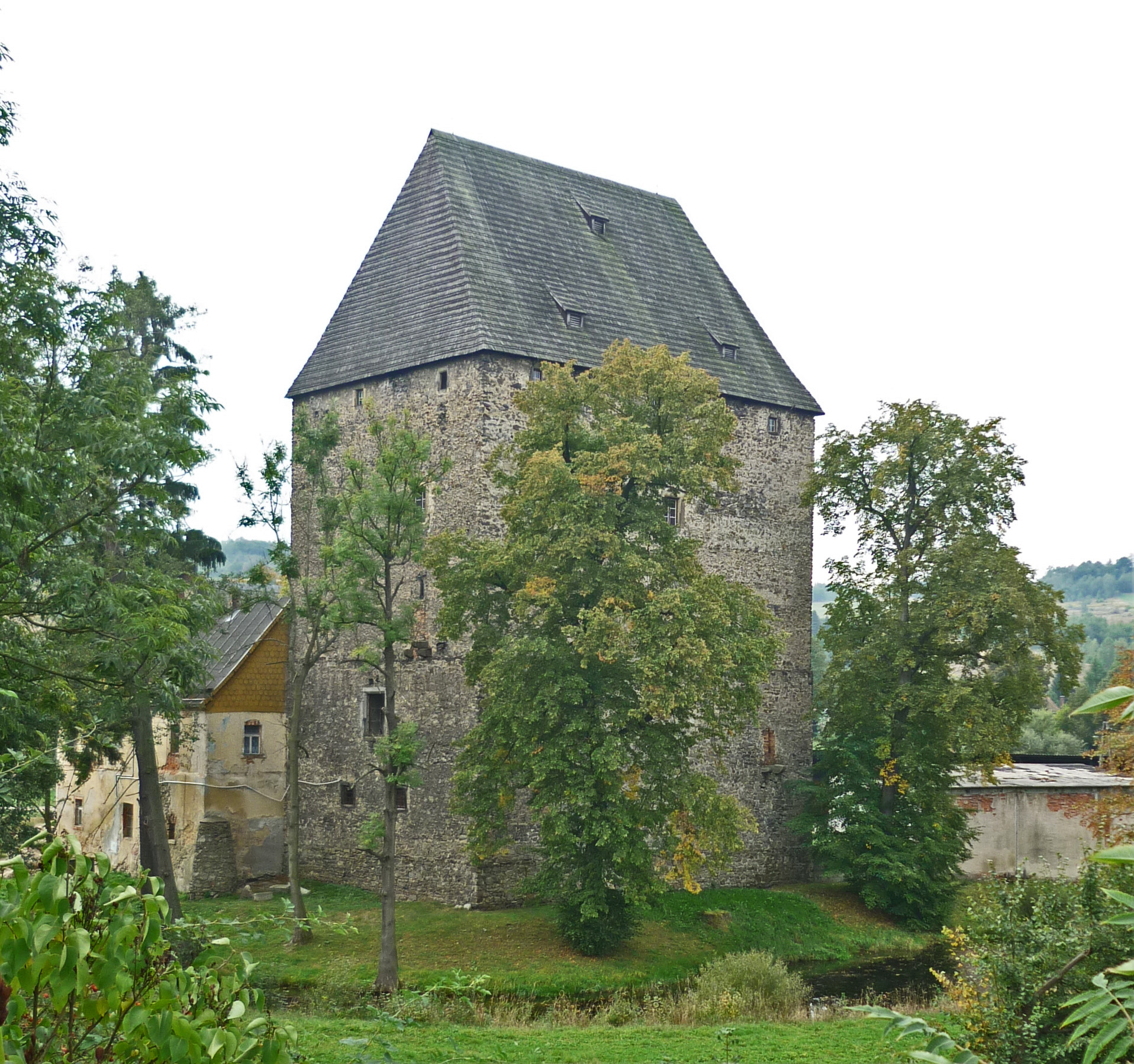
Siedlęcin Tower was built for Henry I between 1312 and 1315.

On the death of his father in 1301, Henry I, his older brother Bernard of Świdnica and his younger brother Bolko II of Ziębice, inherited his domains; however, because they were still minors, Henry I and his siblings were placed under the care of their mother and their maternal uncle Herman, Margrave of Brandenburg-Salzwedel until 1305, when the older brother Bernard was declared an adult and assumed the government and the guardianship of his brothers.

By 1307, Henry I was considered old enough to participate actively in the government. In 1312, he was made the first division of the Duchy: Henry I took Jawor and Lwówek.

Following the model of his father and brother Bernard, Henry I tried to keep his political independence and refused to submit to any of his powerful neighbors. To this end, he approached those who were opposed to King John of Bohemia in Bohemia, represented by the widow of King Wenceslaus II of Bohemia and daughter of the King Przemysł II of Poland, Elisabeth Richeza of Poland and her lover, the powerful magnate Henryk z Lipy.

In 1316, Queen Elisabeth, against the wishes of King John, made the betrothal of her only daughter, Princess Agnes of Bohemia, with Henry I, making him a potential competitor for the Bohemian crown against King John. Shortly after this, and with the consent of Queen Elisabeth, Henry I took with his troops her dower, Hradec Králové, where he organised expeditions in support of rebels against King John. However, two years later, Henry I settled an agreement with King John, thanks to the mediation of the German king Louis IV, Holy Roman Emperor, Henry I's brother-in-law. Shortly after, Queen Elisabeth decided to sell her fiefs to King John.

In 1319, Waldemar, Margrave of Brandenburg-Stendal died without issue and with him, the branch of the House of Ascania who ruled Brandenburg since the 12th century, became extinct. Through his mother, Beatrice, Henry I was one of the closest relatives of the late Margrave. Determined to obtain part of Waldemar's inheritance, he entered with troops and conquered the eastern Lusatia and Zgorzelec. At the same time, the western part of the district of Bautzen was taken by King John of Bohemia. The division was formally accepted by King Louis IV, who became the sovereign of Brandenburg after Waldemar's death, with the towns of Zgorzelec, Lubań, Trzebiel, Żary, Mirsk, Leśna, Zły Komorów, Żytawa, Ostrowiec and Rychbach passing to the Duchy of Jawor. However, the Bohemian King refused to accept the loss of part of Lusatia, so in August and September 1319 erupted a brief war, who ended with an arrangement for the disputed territory of 22 September, that guarantees the status quo in the district.

In 1320, Henry I captured a large portion of Lubusz Land to the northwest of Silesia, which he tried to reclaim as a region lost by his grandfather Bolesław II the Horned. On 27 July 1320, Henry I entered an alliance with Wartislaw IV, Duke of Pomerania in attempt to retain Lubusz Land and capture the towns of Strausberg and Wriezen. In August 1320, the forces of Henry I aided Wartislaw IV in the Uckermark, but lost to Mecklenburg, and in the following months Henry I lost Lubusz Land.

In 1329, part of Lusatia returned to Bohemia, when, for unknown reasons, the inhabitants of Zgorzelec asked the King to join the district to the Bohemian crown. Henry I eventually accepted and switched this land for the towns of Trutnov and Hradec Králové, which were granted by King John only during his lifetime. Henry I retained most of the territory obtained in 1319, with the chief towns of Lubań, Zły Komorów and Żytawa. His possession over these lands ended in 1337, when after an agreement signed on 4 January in Wrocław, he received from Bohemia in exchange for his lands in Lusatia, the Duchy of Głogów, but only during his lifetime. This arrangement also made Henry I an independent ally of the Bohemian crown and one of the most powerful and notorious Silesian Dukes of the Piast dynasty. Shortly after, in exchange for obtaining Kąty Wrocławskie, Henry I paid homage to the Bohemian King.

In 1319, Henry I formally married Agnes of Bohemia (15 June 1305 – 4 January 1337), the only child of King Wenceslaus II of Bohemia from his second marriage with Elisabeth Richeza of Poland. However, because they are related in the fourth degree of kinship, it was necessary to obtain the Papal dispensation for the wedding, which was granted only in 1325. The couple remained childless, although Agnes did have a pregnancy, but she suffered a miscarriage in the first trimester when she rode with her horse over a hill, which caused her to keep in bed for many months.

Henry I died by 15 May 1346 and was buried in the Krzeszów Abbey. Today, in Lwówek Śląski was conserved a silver tombstone, called "The Nun and the Knight" (rycerz i zakonnica), who apparently represented Henry I and his wife Agnes. Previously, the tombstone was in the Franciscan monastery of Lwówek.

== Bibliography ==
- Marek, Miroslav. "Complete Genealogy of the House of Piast". Genealogy.EU.

Preceded by Bolko I the Strict	Duke of Jawor with Bernard and Bolko II (until 1312); 1301 – 1346	Succeeded by Bolko II the Small
Preceded by Bolko I the Strict	Duke of Lwówek with Bernard and Bolko II (until 1312); 1301 – 1346	Succeeded by Bolko II the Small
Preceded by Bolko I the Strict	Duke of Świdnica with Bernard and Bolko II; 1301 – 1312	Succeeded by Bernard of Świdnica and Bolko II of Ziębice
Preceded by Bolko I the Strict	Duke of Ziębice with Bernard and Bolko II; 1301 – 1312	Succeeded by Bernard of Świdnica and Bolko II of Ziębice
Preceded by Direct sovereignty of the Kingdom of Bohemia last holder Przemko II of Głogów	Duke of Glogów; 1337 – 1346	Succeeded by Annexed by the Kingdom of Bohemia; in 1349 one half of the Duchy to Henry V the Iron and the other half in 1360 to Constance of Świdnica, widow of Przemko II
