= Elizabeth of Poland, Queen of Hungary =

Elizabeth of Poland
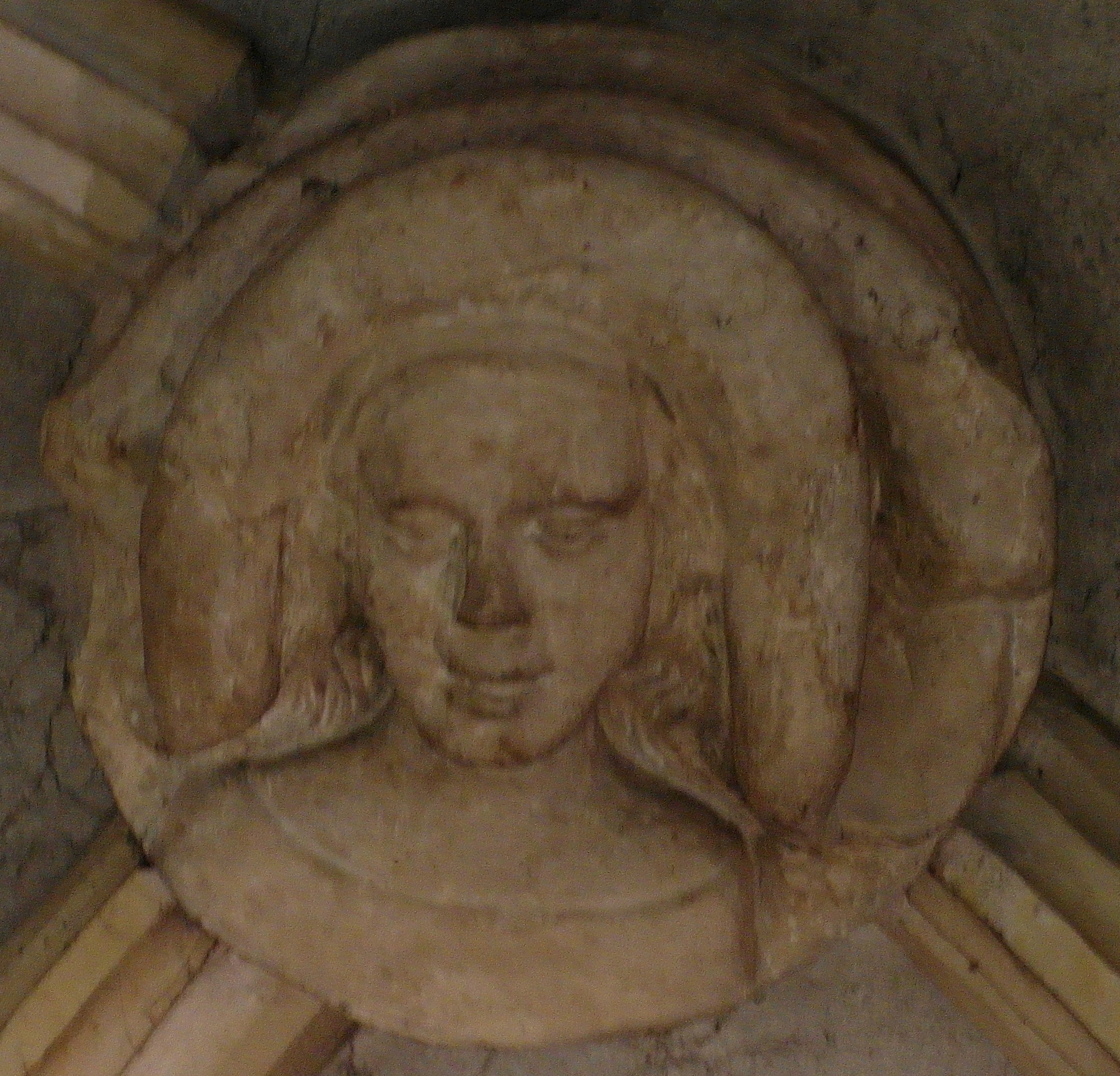
- Alleged representation of Queen Elizabeth on the keystone in Hetmańska House in Kraków

Queen consort of Hungary
- Tenure: 1320–1342

Regent of Poland
- Regency: 1370–1376
- Monarch: Louis I
- Born: 1305
- Died: 29 December 1380 (aged 74–75)
- Spouse: Charles I of Hungary
- Issue: Louis I of Hungary and Poland; Andrew, Duke of Calabria; Stephen, Duke of Slavonia; Charles of Hungary; Ladislaus of Hungary
- House: Piast
- Father: Władysław I the Elbow-high
- Mother: Jadwiga of Greater Poland

Elizabeth of Poland (Hungarian: Erzsébet, Polish: Elżbieta; 1305 – 29 December 1380) was Queen of Hungary by marriage to Charles I of Hungary, and regent of Poland from 1370 to 1376 during the reign of her son Louis I.

Elizabeth was a member of the Polish royal House of Piast, the daughter of Władysław I the Elbow-high, prince of Kuyavia, later King of Poland, and Jadwiga of Kalisz. She was the sister of Casimir III of Poland, who died in 1370. Her older sister was Cunigunde of Poland, who was married to Bernard of Świdnica.

Elizabeth was a controversial and politically ambitious woman of her time, she is a great example of the political influence that royal women wielded in the 14th century. She had a long and eventful life as one of the most powerful women in Europe. From her tumultuous regency in Poland that ended in violence, to an assassination attempt that left her disabled, and to the introduction of the first alcohol based perfume in Europe, she lived a life that shaped Europe but is often overlooked for the achievements made by her son Louis I. She and her husband Charles I spread Hungarian hegemony throughout Central and Eastern Europe by marrying her three surviving sons to Poland, Naples, and Slavonia respectively. Elizabeth was of the last generation of the Polish royal house of Piast, a dynasty that ruled Poland to at least the mid 10th century.

== Queen consort ==
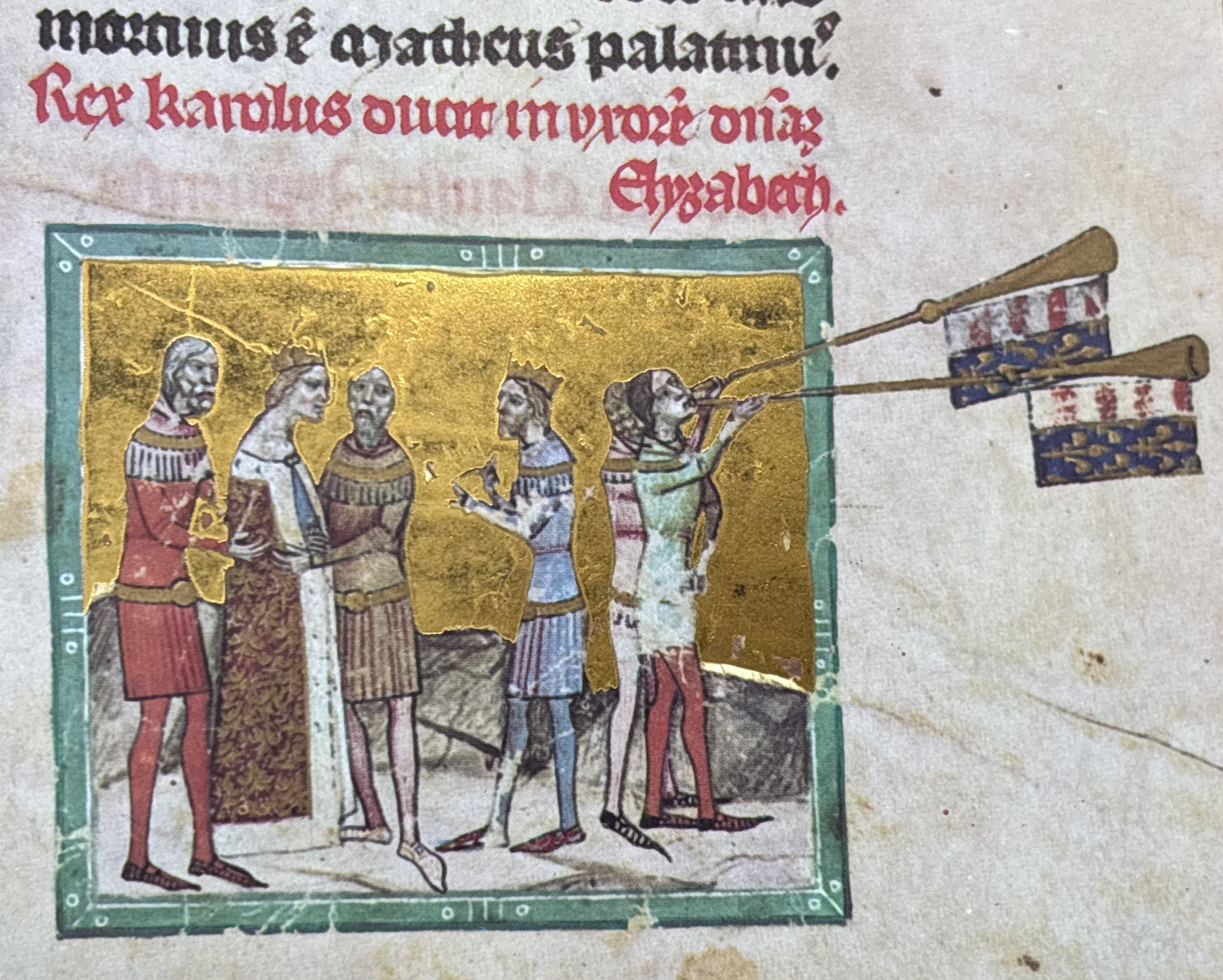
Elisabeth's marriage to Charles Robert of Hungary

She was married on 6 July 1320 to Charles I Robert, King of Hungary. Elizabeth was Charles' fourth wife. This marriage would eventually lead to the first Polish-Hungarian union in 1370 after Casamir III gave the Polish throne to Louis I as inheritance. The marriage prevented Poland from being politically isolated during a period where Poland was relatively weak while Bohemia and the Teutonic order were rising threats in the region.This alliance later led to the sending of troops to assist Poland in the war against the Teutonic order. This union lasted until the death of Louis I in 1382.

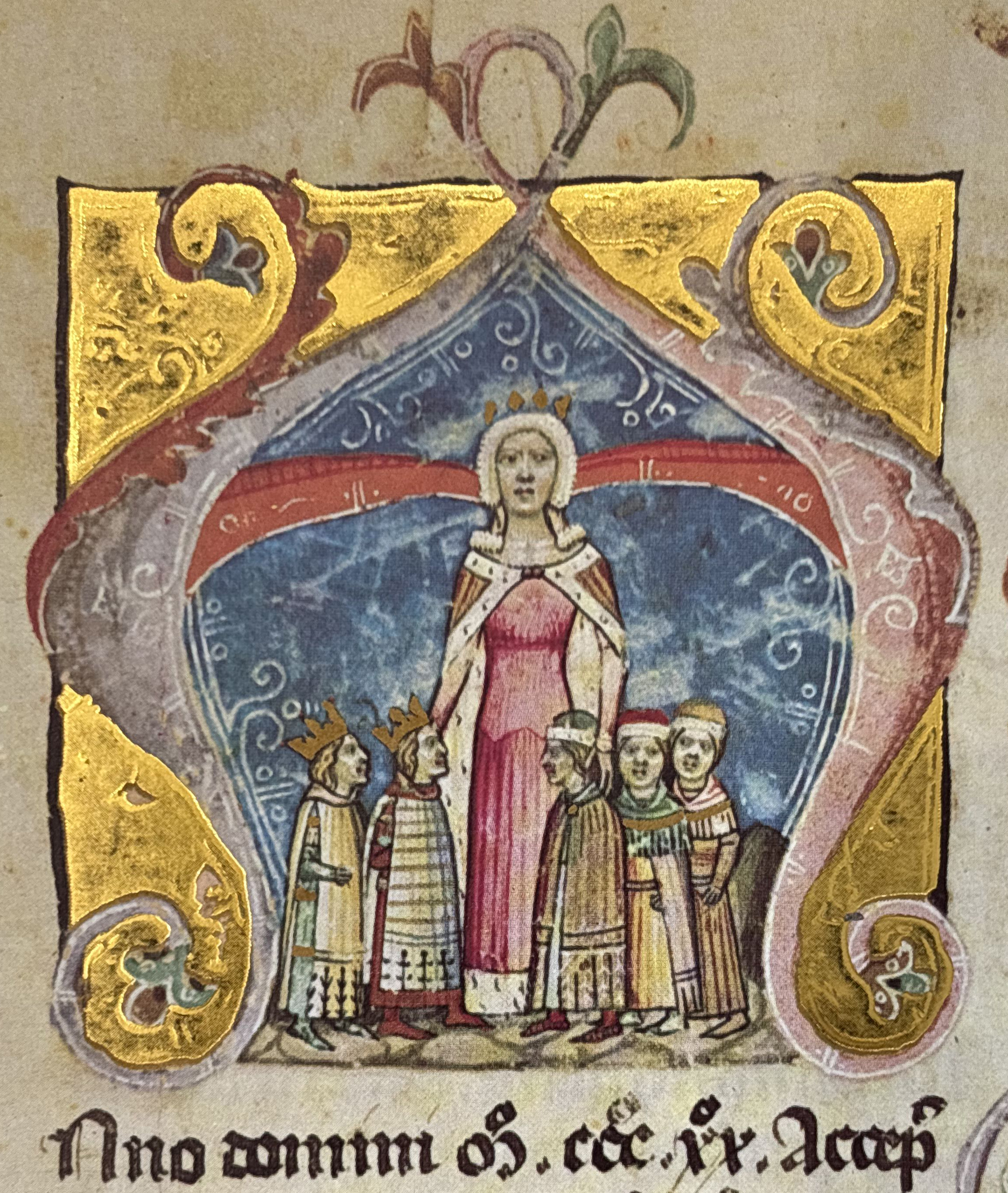
Queen Elizabeth with her children

While in the Hungarian court Elizabeth is given credit for creating “Hungary water” or “Queen of Hungary water”, an alcohol based perfume that would be the first of its kind introduced to Europe. The origins of who actually created it are unknown, however most sources describe it as coming from a monk. There are many legends around this perfume, including it making her so beautiful that at the age of 72 the widow was proposed to by the King of Poland. This is untrue as the king of Poland at this time would have been her own son however, it shows some of the mystic abilities believed of the perfume. Hungary water was also used as a cure-all by some doctors at the time.

== Assassination attempt ==
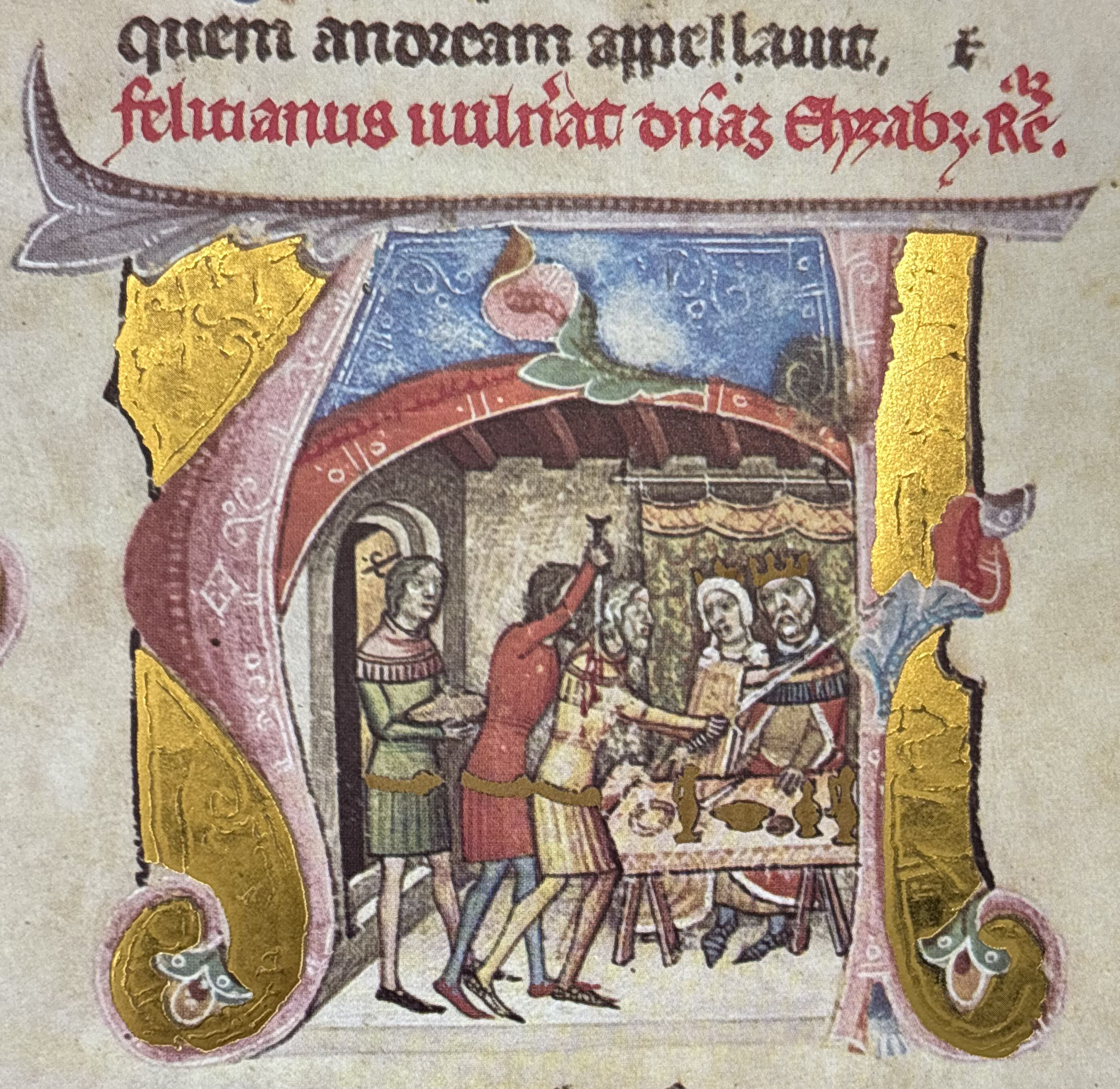
The attempt of Felician Záh on the royal family, depicted in the Illuminated Chronicle

In 1330, Felician Zah attempted to kill the royal family by attempting to stab them with his sword. King Charles I was slightly wounded on his right and Elizabeth lost four fingers on her right hand. Felician also attempted to kill the princes but he was stopped by their tutors acting as shields for the princes. Eventually, the assassin was stopped by one of Elizabeth's cup bearers using a dagger to stab him near the neck. Afterwards, the guards of the royal family rushed in and executed Felician. Later, he was dismembered and his descendants were mutilated.

- His daughter Clara had 8 fingers cut off and had her lips and nose mutilated. She was then paraded throughout various cities reciting the words, "Whoever is unfaithful to the king, let him suffer in full the like retribution."
- His daughter, Sebe, who was already married was beheaded. Another son, Kopaj, was imprisoned and then executed. The rest of his sons were taken in by crusaders never to return.
- Any nobles that were related to Felician were also executed, effectively ending his family.

These punishments were quite extreme, but it sent a clear message. Betrayal by such a trusted member of the court would not only have you killed, but your entire lineage wiped out. Clara was also accused of knowing of her father's intentions.

The reasons for this assassination attempt are hotly debated, The Illuminated Chronicles leaves out a reason, possibly because the chronicler was a cleric in the chapel of Elizabeth. Later sources, like from the chronicler Jan Długosz, describe a story of the queen leading Zah's daughter Clara to a room where Casimir III the Great was pretending to be sick and left the room for him to rape her. Later in the 16th century another source explains the reason as being Zah was being deprived of lands and titles by Charles. With so many different stories the actual motive has never been determined.

=== Queen mother ===
After the death of her husband, Elizabeth began to set up political marriages to spread the Piast-Anjou alliance in Europe. For her son Louis, she had her son betrothed to Margaret of Bohemia, daughter of Charles IV, Holy Roman Emperor. They married in 1342 but the marriage didn't last because, seven years into the marriage, the fourteen-year-old Margaret died, childless. Elizabeth now needed for her son to remarry and produce an heir.

The branch of the Kuyavian Piast family was popular in Hungary, and several members lived in Louis' court. Elizabeth's influence extended far beyond any other queen consort, and years before, Stephen II, Ban of Bosnia, married Elizabeth of Kuyavia, the daughter of the Duke Kazimierz III of Gniewkowo, Queen Elizabeth's cousin. Stephen II of Bosnia had a young daughter named Elizabeth, and after learning about her, the Hungarian queen insisted immediately on bringing her to the Hungarian court for fostering. Stephen was reluctant at first, but eventually dispatched Elizabeth. Three years later, Queen Elizabeth invited Stephen to Hungary and arranged a marriage between their children.

Elizabeth has been described as a domineering mother-in-law to Elizabeth of Bosnia. This is most evident by the fact that Elizabeth of Bosnia had no court of her own until her mother-in-law left to her regency in Poland.

Elizabeth's second surviving son, Andrew, married Joanna I of Naples. Andrew wished to be made king of Naples and rule jointly with his wife, but Joanna refuse and when her grandfather died Andrew was left out of the will. Pope Clement VI approved Joanna's request to be crowned alone. Fearing for his life, Andrew wrote to his mother that he would soon flee the kingdom and his Hungarian retainers informed his mother of his uncertain situation. She intervened and made a state visit, bringing a large sum of the Hungarian treasury, around 27,000 marks of silver and 21,000 marks of gold; before she returned to Hungary, she bribed the Pope to reverse himself and permit Andrew's coronation. She also gave her son a ring, which was supposed to protect him from death by blade or poison, and returned with a false sense of security to Hungary. The ring didn't protect him; Andrew was soon assassinated by strangulation. This later led to the invasion of Naples by Louis I, An initially successful campaign but that ultimately resulted in no permanent gains by Louis, as when Louis left Joanna reclaimed her throne.

=== Formation of Polish-Hungarian Union ===
Elizabeth's son Louis I of Hungary inherited the Polish throne from his uncle Casimir III the Great after he failed to produce a male heir, leading to the Union of Hungary and Poland, a tumultuous union that lasted 12 years. The union was very unpopular in Poland and Louis felt like he was unwelcome and therefore spent very little time in Poland. The Poles were unhappy with the growing influence of a foreign power inside Poland and Louis and Elizabeth did little to alleviate these concerns. Louis had only visited Poland three times and would often summon any nobles that wished to speak to him in Hungary. Elizabeth also kept a large Hungarian court which was infamously unpopular and in 1376 160 members of it were massacred and Elizabeth fled back to Hungary.While this would be the most violent incident in the union, it was not the only sign of its dysfunction. In 1374 Louis had no heirs after his brother's death in 1360, this led to Louis creating the Koszyce agreement. An arrangement that his daughters would inherit the throne, however it was only agreed upon after Louis locked the gates of the city until every noble agreed. Thus this preserved the Angevin dynasty. The union later dissolved after the death of Louis in 1382.

=== Death ===
After her regency and her return to Hungary, Elizabeth spent her final years in a monastery outside of Buda, where she wrote her will. It specifies her desire to rest in the monastery of Order of Saint Clare in Old Buda. Elizabeth also left money and possessions to her family: she left Louis several golden vessels, daughter-in-law, Elizabeth of Bosnia - Buda Castle, granddaughter, Mary - a gold wreath, granddaughter, Jadwiga - wreath of lilies, and her niece, Hedwig - a ring. She also left money to some churches.

== Issue ==
- Charles (1321)
- Ladislaus (Belgrade, 1 November 1324 – 24 February 1329)
- Louis I of Hungary (1326–1382)
- Andrew, Duke of Calabria (1327–1345)
- Stephen, Duke of Slavonia (1332–1354)
- Catherine (d. 1355)
- Elizabeth (d.1367), married Boleslaw Opolski, sister of Katherine and also possible daughter of Elisabeth of Poland.

== Legacy ==
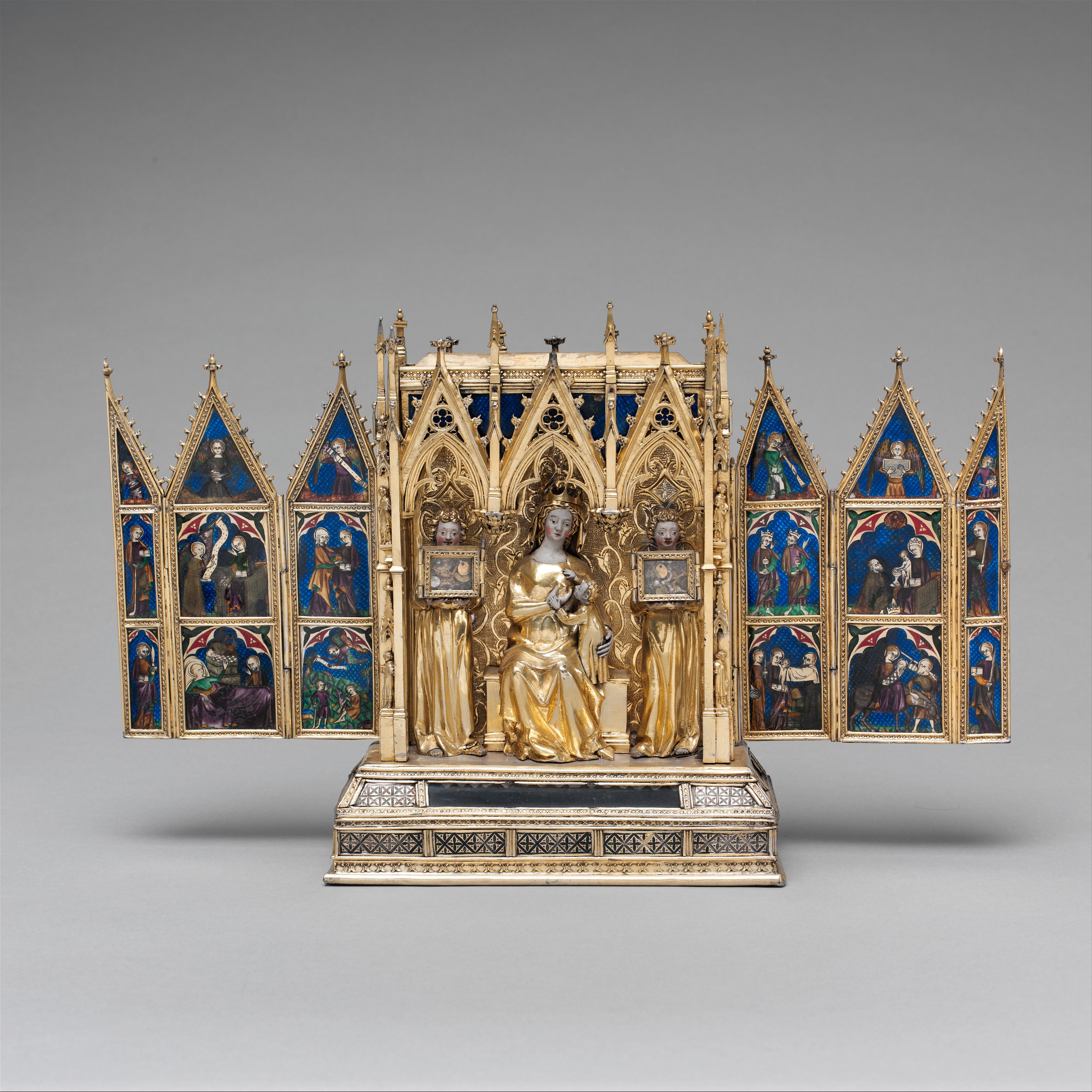
Reliquary Shrine of Elizabeth of Poland, attributed to Jean de Touyl, ca. 1350

Elizabeth was a renowned patron of arts and founder of many shrines which she fitted with wonderful treasures. Exquisite examples of the Queen's foundation include the silver Reliquary Shrine with Virgin and Child from about 1350, now in the Metropolitan Museum of Art, attributed to Jean de Touyl, most probably created for the convent of the Poor Clares of the Order of Saint Francis at Buda, also founded by the Queen in 1334, and the silver reliquary of Saint Nicholas in the form of a gothic church from 1344, attributed to Pietro di Simone Gallico, now in the Museo Nicolaiano in Bari. Elizabeth also inspired the foundation of the Hungarian Chapel in Aachen and sponsored some of its treasures.

== In popular culture ==
=== Film ===
Queen Elizabeth is one of the supporting characters in Polish historical drama TV series "Korona królów" ("The Crown of the Kings"). She is played by Katarzyna Czapla.

== See also ==
- Hungary Water

== Notes ==
Elizabeth of Poland, Queen of Hungary Piast Dynasty Born: 1305 Died: 1380
Royal titles
| Vacant Title last held by Beatrice of Luxembourg | Queen consort of Hungary; 1320–1342 | Vacant Title next held by Margaret of Luxembourg |
