= Mihály Kovács (painter) =

Hungarian painter (1818–1892)

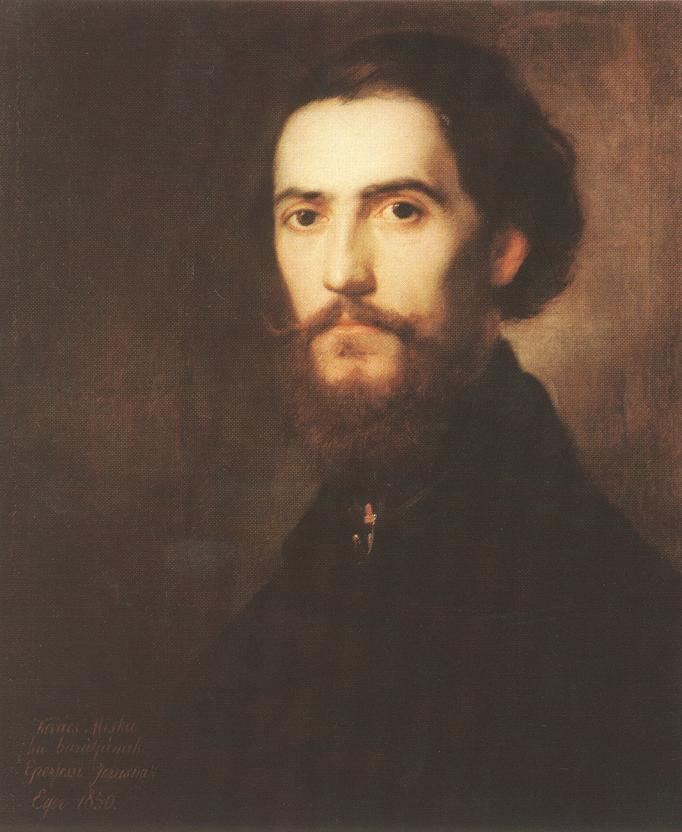
Kovács, self-portrait, 1850

Mihály Kovács (18 July 1818 – 3 August 1892) was a Hungarian painter.

Kovács was born in Abádszalók and died in Budapest. Several of his paintings can be found in the Hungarian National Gallery, including the Palatine Garay defends Queens Mary and Elizabeth (cca 1885).
