= Jadwiga of Kalisz =

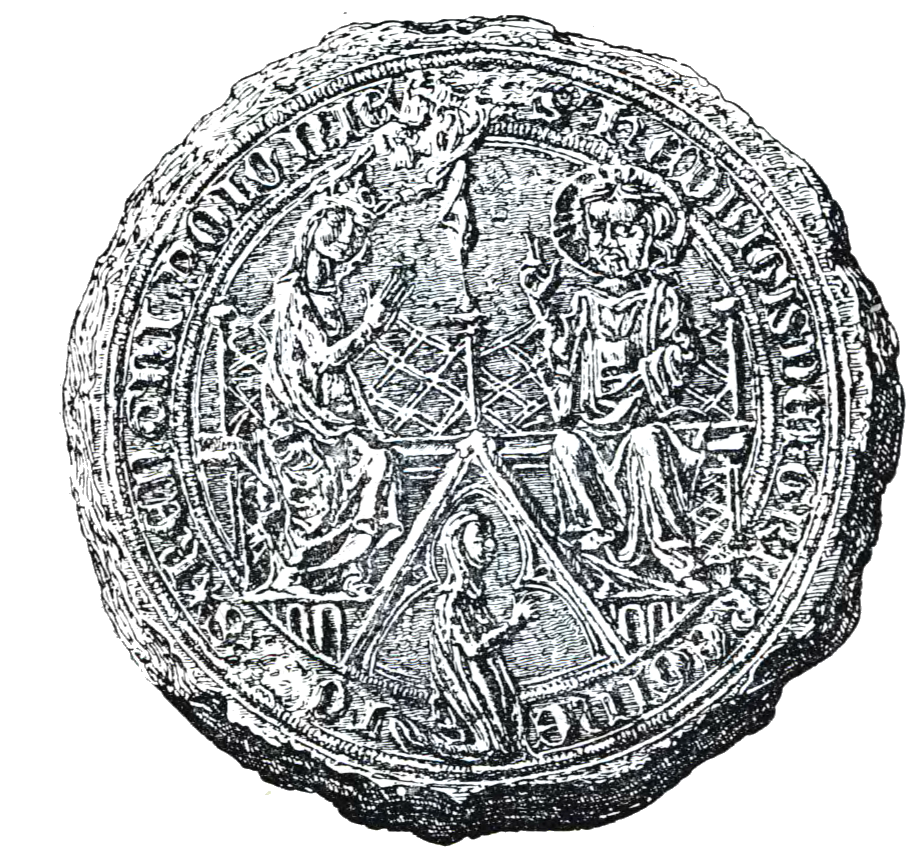
- Seal of Queen Jadwiga

Queen consort of Poland
- Tenure: 1320 – c. 1333
- Coronation: 30 January 1320
- Born: c. 1266
- Died: 10 December 1339 (aged 72–73)
- Burial: Clarissine convent in Stary Sącz
- Spouse: Ladislaus the Short
- Issue: Kunigunde, Duchess of Świdnica; Casimir III of Poland; Elizabeth, Queen of Hungary
- House: Piast
- Father: Bolesław the Pious
- Mother: Yolanda of Hungary

Jadwiga of Kalisz (Polish: Jadwiga kaliska (Bolesławówna); c. 1266 – 10 December 1339) was Queen of Poland by marriage to Ladislaus the Short. She was the mother of the last Piast King of Poland, Casimir III.

== Life ==
Born in 1266, Jadwiga was the second of three daughters born to Bolesław the Pious and Saint Yolanda of Hungary. In 1293, Jadwiga married Ladislaus I of Poland.

Jadwiga's husband, Ladislaus (Polish: Władysław, known as the "Short" and the "Elbow-high"), was a bitter rival of Wenceslaus II of Bohemia who was King of Poland between 1291–1305. Life was dangerous for Jadwiga and her family during this time, she and three of her children had to go into hiding for a while in 1300. In 1305, Wenceslaus II died and was succeeded by his son, Wenceslaus III of Bohemia. Wenceslaus III reigned for a year before he was assassinated by Germans under mysterious circumstances so his campaign of Poland ended. His wife, Viola of Teschen, had not borne him any children, so Ladislaus assumed control in Poland.

In 1318, Ladislaus began making attempts to have himself crowned king. The pope, John XXII, though initially unwilling, finally granted his approval and Ladislaus and Jadwiga were crowned King and Queen of Poland on 30 January 1320 in Kraków; a new crown was made for the new queen and it was later used to crown other queens of Poland. The coronation was a sign that he had overcome Poland's internal fragmentation and re-united and re-instated the country as an independent kingdom under his rule. Poland now needed friends abroad; so in 1320, Jadwiga and Władysław's daughter Elizabeth (1305–1380) married Charles I of Hungary. Jadwiga played an active part in politics during her husband's reign.

Jadwiga's husband, Ladislaus, died in 1333. She assumed the regency of Stary Sącz in 1334 when Constance of Świdnica, her granddaughter by Kunigunde, resigned to become a nun. Jadwiga lived until 1339.

== Issue ==
In addition to Elizabeth, Ladislaus and Jadwiga had:

- Elizabeth (1305–1380) married Charles I of Hungary
- Stephen (d. 1306)
- Władysław (d. 1311/1312)
- Kunigunde of Poland (c. 1298-1331)
- Casimir III the Great (1310–1370)
- Jadwiga (d. 1320/1322).

== In popular culture ==
=== Film ===
Jadwiga of Kalisz is a primary character in the first season of the Polish historical drama Korona królów ("The Crown of the Kings").

== Sources ==
- Bérier, Franciszek Longchamps de; Domingo, Rafael (2022). Law and Christianity in Poland: The Legacy of the Great Jurists. Taylor & Francis. ISBN 978-1-000-81448-4.
- Davies, Norman (1982). God's Playground: A History of Poland. Vol. I: The Origins to 1795. Columbia University Press. ISBN 9780231053518.
- Jasienica, Paweł (1985). Piast Poland. American Institute of Polish Culture. ISBN 9780870521348.
- Jasiński, K. (2001). Rodowód Piastów małopolskich i kujawskich [Pedigree of the Piasts of Lesser Poland and Kuyavia] (in Polish). Wydawn. Historyczne.
- Lerski, George J. (1996). Historical Dictionary of Poland, 966-1945. Greenwood Press. ISBN 9780313034565.
- Prazmowska, Anita (2011). A History of Poland. Bloomsbury Publishing. ISBN 9780230252363.
- Jaspert, Nikolas (2019). Queens, Princesses and Mendicants: Close Relations in a European Perspective. LIT Verlag Münster. p. 245. ISBN 978-3-643-91092-9.

Jadwiga of Kalisz House of Piast Born: 1266 Died: 10 December 1339
Royal titles
Vacant Title last held by Viola of Teschen	Queen consort of Poland; 1320–1333	Succeeded by Aldona of Lithuania
