= Bolko II the Small =

Duke of Silesia (d. 1368)

- Duke of Świdnica Jawor, Lwówek, Lusatia, Siewierz
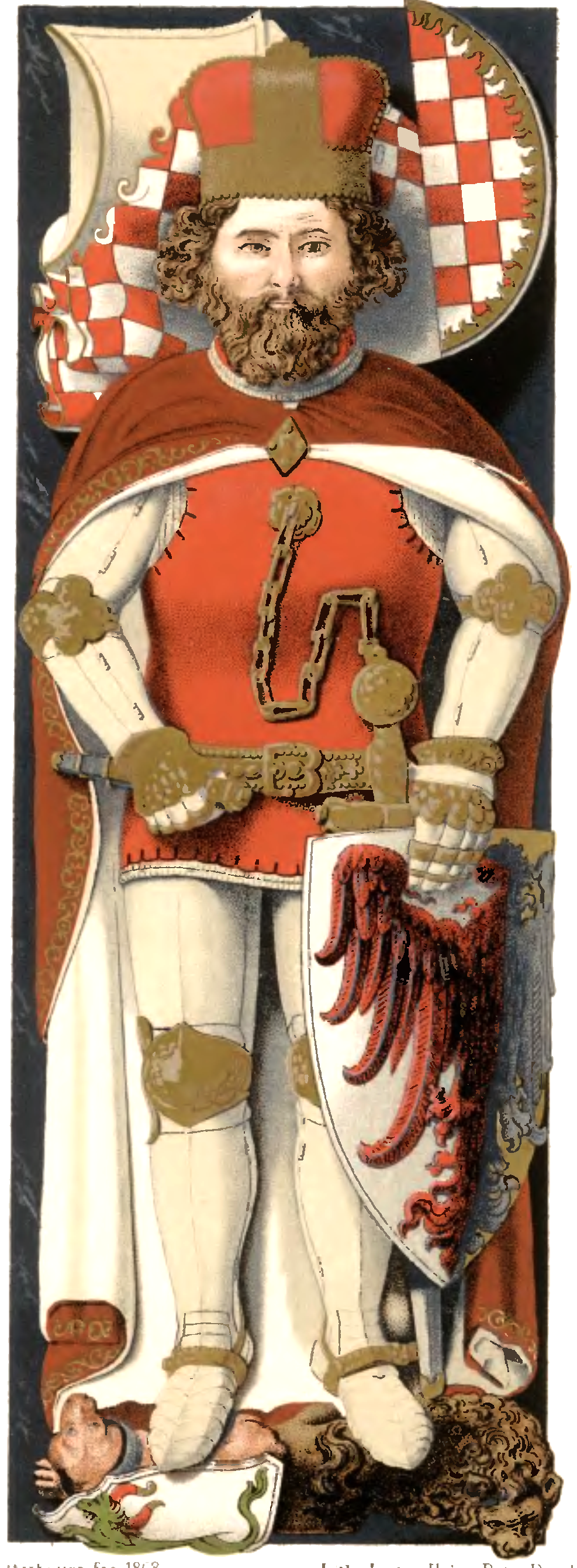
- Bolko II's tomb effigy in Krzeszów (Grüssau). In the picture an attempt was made to reconstruct medieval polychrome.
- Born: c. 1312
- Died: 28 July 1368
- Noble family: Silesian Piasts
- Spouse: Agnes of Austria
- Father: Bernard of Świdnica
- Mother: Kunigunde of Poland

Bolko II the Small (c. 1312 – 28 July 1368), was the last independent Duke of the Piast dynasty in Silesia. He was Duke of Świdnica from 1326, Duke of Jawor and Lwówek from 1346, Duke of Lusatia from 1364, Duke over half of Brzeg and Oława from 1358, Duke of Siewierz from 1359, and Duke over half of Głogów and Ścinawa from 1361.

He was the oldest son of Bernard, Duke of Świdnica, by his wife Kunigunde, daughter of Władysław I the Elbow-high, King of Poland. Like his maternal grandfather, Bolko II was of small stature; his nickname, "the Small" (Mały), reflects this and was used in contemporary sources.

== Early years ==
After the death of his father in 1326, Bolko II, with his younger brother Henry II as co-ruler, succeeded him in all his domains. Because both princes were still in their teenage years, they were at first aided by their two paternal uncles, Dukes Bolko II of Ziębice and Henry I of Jawor, as well as their mother Kunigunde, who in 1328 remarried to Rudolf I, Duke of Saxe-Wittenberg. Through this union, Bolko II gained a half-brother, Mieszko of Saxe-Wittenberg (b. ca. 1330 – d. 1350). Kunigunde died in 1331, after which Bolko II ruled by himself.

== Attempts at independence ==
One of the first problems that Bolko II had to face during the first years of his personal reign was the preservation of his small duchy's independence. It became a separate identity during the fragmentation of Poland, and so was not under the control of the Polish Kingdom nor by any of other neighbors. However, King John of Bohemia, hoped to gain control of the small Silesian duchies. The first serious attempt by King John was to force the Duke of Świdnica to accept his overlordship in 1329. He succeeded in gaining control of much of Silesia as almost all the Piast rulers paid him homage. However, two of the Silesian rulers strongly refused to become his vassals: Bolko II and his brother-in-law (husband of his sister Constance), Duke Przemko II of Głogów.

Bolko II needed more troops in order to preserve his position, so he decided to visit the court of the King Charles Robert of Hungary, where he strongly defended the sovereignty of his dukedom. Shortly after, he also established contacts with his grandfather, the Polish king Władysław I the Elbow-high, and in August 1329 he went to Italy to the camp of Louis IV of Bavaria, recently crowned Holy Roman Emperor.

== Relations with Bohemia ==
Bolko II's efforts proved unsuccessful in deterring King John, who, allied with the Teutonic Order in an attempt to distract the Poles, had invaded Silesia in 1331. Details of Bolko II's actions during that time are unknown, but King John's progress through Silesia was not easy: the siege of Niemcza and the disputed Głogów took longer than he expected. His forces were delayed in reaching Kalisz, where was made to come to terms with Bolko II. In the end, all King John was able to conquer was to incorporate into Bohemia the Duchy of Głogów.

In 1336, Bolko II achieved a sought for political goal when his uncle Bolko II of Ziębice put himself under King John's rule. This submission was in return for lifelong reign over the Kłodzko region. This was influenced by the declaration of the new Polish king, Casimir III the Great, renouncing his claims over Silesia.

Bolko II nonetheless continued his attempts at pursuing an alliance with Poland and Hungary against Bohemia. In order to enhance his international position, on 1 June 1338 Bolko II married Agnes, daughter of Leopold I, and a member of the Habsburgs, then chief rivals of the Luxembourgs in Central Europe. He gained some significant concessions, among them a trade agreement allowing merchants from his lands access to Galicia. Eventually, on 1 January 1345, his mediation resulted in the official alliance between the Wittelsbachs, Poland and Hungary.

== Casimir III's war against Bohemia ==
Soon afterwards, King Casimir III of Poland used this new alliance in his favor. Polish king imprisoned king John's eldest son and heir Charles, Margrave of Moravia (future Holy Roman Emperor). King John in turn responded by invading Bolko II's lands, and the Polish and Hungarian kings declared war. This allowed Bolko II to push back the now divided Bohemian forces during the siege of Świdnica (Schweidnitz). However, the Holy Roman Emperor Louis IV quickly signed a temporary truce with the Bohemian king. The war continue with varying fortunes for the combatants, with no major successes for either of the parties. On the Świdnica side, Bolko II lost the fortress in Kamienna Góra in 1345, but recaptured it in 1348, using subterfuge and disguising his troops as merchants. The war ended in a draw. King John didn't live to see the end of it; he died in 1346, in a different war, at the Battle of Crécy. Emperor Louis IV died one year later. On 22 November 1348, the peace was signed in Namysłów, although Bolko II, for unknown reasons, didn't take part in those negotiations, and was instead represented by King Casimir III. The final normalization of the relations between Bolko II and new Bohemian and German King (later Emperor) Charles IV only occurred as a result of the mediation of Duke Albert II of Austria on 16 August 1350.

== Settlement with Charles IV ==
After the signing of the treaty of 1350, Bolko II began the process of rapprochement with the House of Luxembourg. This was done without sacrificing his good relations with the kings Casimir III of Poland and Louis I of Hungary.

By 1346, after the death of his last surviving uncle, Duke Henry I of Jawor, Bolko II inherited his domains, the Duchies of Jawor and Lwówek. Soon before, Bolko II's younger brother and co-ruler Henry II died, leaving only one daughter, Anna. Bolko II, as the closest male relative, became Anna's legal guardian and began to consider his niece as heiress to all his lands.

On 13 December 1350, 11-year-old Anna and the then 11-month-old Wenceslaus, eldest son and heir of King Charles IV, were betrothed. Under the terms of the engagement contract, the couple would inherit Bolko's lands in the (likely) case of his heirless death (however, it was stipulated that they could only take formal possession of the duchies after the death of Bolko's wife Agnes of Austria, who, under her husband's will, received his domains as her dower). However, fifteen days later, on 28 December, the young Wenceslaus died and the settlement was broken. Nevertheless, Charles decided not to abandon his intentions to take control in a peaceful way over Bolko II's heritage. The death of his second wife Anna of Bavaria, mother of the late Wenceslaus, on 2 February 1353 gave him a new opportunity to obtain both duchies; almost immediately, he asked Bolko II for the hand of his niece in marriage and the former agreement was renewed. The wedding took place in Hungarian capital Buda (where Anna had lived with her mother since the death of her father) on 27 May 1353. Besides Bolko II, the wedding was attended by: Duke Albert II of Austria, King Louis I of Hungary, Margrave Louis VI of Brandenburg, Duke Rudolf I of Saxe-Wittenberg (Bolko's stepfather) and envoys of King Casimir III and the Republic of Venice.

On 28 July, Anna was crowned Queen of Bohemia in Prague by Archbishop Arnošt of Pardubice. On 9 February 1354, in Aachen, she was crowned German Queen. As part of Charles IV's coronation as Holy Roman Emperor in the Roman Basilica of Saint Peter on 5 April 1355, Anne was crowned Empress of the Holy Roman Empire. She thereby became the first Queen of Bohemia to become Empress.

== Luxembourg alliance and expansion ==
The politics of close cooperation with Charles IV of Luxembourg brought the Duke of Świdnica considerable benefits, especially in the expansion of his frontiers. Due to the prosperity of his domains, Bolko II bought much land from less prosperous Silesian dukes. In 1358 he bought the gold mine in Złoty Stok (Reichenstein), and half of Brzeg and Oława from Duke Wenceslaus I of Legnica; soon after, he also bought half of Ścinawa from Duke Jan. In 1359 the Emperor allowed him to buy territories across the Bohemian border, including Frýdlant, and shortly after Bolko II also bought the town of Siewierz from the Dukes of Cieszyn for the amount of 2,300 fines. In 1360, Bolko II bought Kąty Wrocławskie In the same year his good relations with the Emperor were demonstrated when, after almost thirty years, the rights of Przemko II's widow Constance over the half of Głogów were finally accepted. Głogów had been under Bohemian control (the other half was given to the Dukes of Żagań in 1349). One year later, in 1361, Constance (who had been a nun since the death of her husband) renounced her domains on to her husband's brother Bolko II. The Emperor, increasingly sure he would gain the property back, was now willing to pass it to his father-in-law.

Bolko II's biggest asset, however, proved to be the acquisition, together with the Emperor on 14 April 1364, of the large town and lands near Lusatia for the enormous sum of 21,000 fine silver, which became one of the most important and prestigious of his possessions.

In 1364 he was one of the monarchs invited to the Congress of Kraków, where he took part in the famous Wierzynek Feast, where, along with the host, King Casimir III of Poland, he also assisted the Kings Louis I of Hungary, Valdemar IV of Denmark and Peter I of Cyprus; and the Dukes Otto V of Bavaria, Władysław of Opole and Bogislaw V of Pomerania-Stolp.

== Death and succession ==
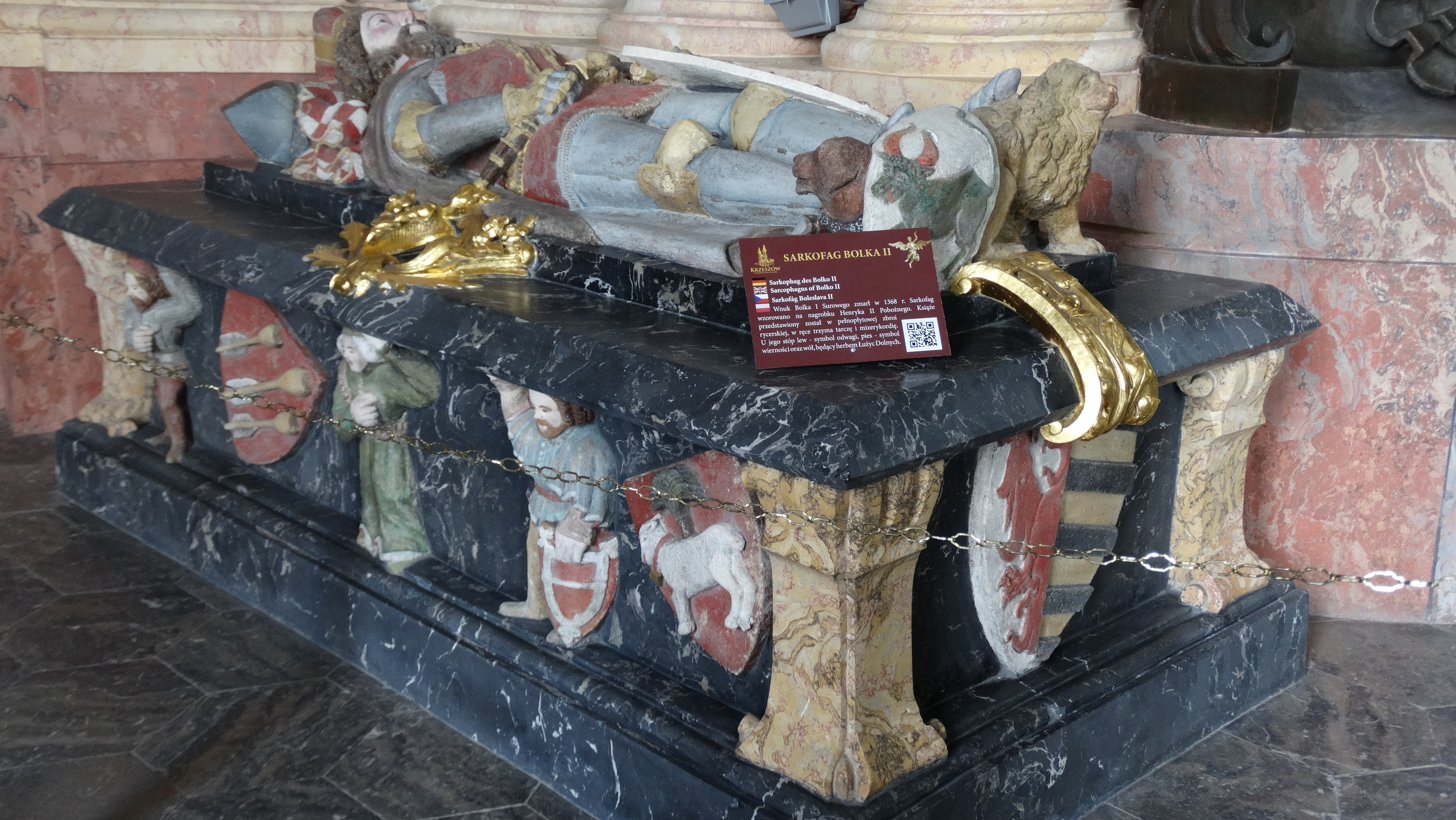
Sarcophagus of Bolko in the Princes' Chapel of Krzeszów (Grüssau) Abbey, Lower Silesia

Bolko died on 28 July 1368 and was buried in the Grüssau Abbey. He was the last of the independent Silesian dukes from the Piast dynasty, the line started by Władysław II the Exile. His lands were held by his wife until 1392; however, after her death they were incorporated into the Crown of Bohemia by Wenceslaus IV, only son of Emperor Charles IV and Anna of Świdnica.

Preceded by Bernard	Duke of Świdnica with Henry II (until 1345); 1326–1368	Succeeded by Agnes
Preceded by Henry I	Duke of Jawor; 1346–1368	Succeeded by Agnes
Preceded by Henry I	Duke of Lwówek; 1346–1368	Succeeded by Agnes
Preceded by Wenceslaus I	Duke of Brzeg (1/2); 1358–1368	Succeeded by Louis I the Fair
Preceded by Przemysław I Noszak	Duke of Siewierz; 1359–1368	Succeeded by Przemysław I Noszak
Preceded by Constance	Duke of Głogów (1/2); 1361–1368	Succeeded by Annexed to the Kingdom of Bohemia next holder Przemysław I Noszak
Preceded by Jan	Duke of Ścinawa (1/2); 1365–1368	Succeeded by Annexed to the Kingdom of Bohemia next holder Przemysław I Noszak
