= Bernard of Świdnica =

Bernard
- Duke of Jawor-Lwówek-Świdnica-Ziębice
- Coat-of-arms of Świdnica
- Born: c. 1291
- Died: 6 May 1326
- Noble family: Silesian Piasts
- Spouse: Kunigunde of Poland
- Issue: Bolko II the Small; Constance; Elisabeth; Henry II of Świdnica
- Father: Bolko I the Strict
- Mother: Beatrice of Brandenburg

Bernard (II) of Świdnica (Polish: Bernard świdnicki) (c. 1291 – 6 May 1326) was a Duke of Jawor-Lwówek-Świdnica-Ziębice between 1301 and 1312 (with his brothers as co-rulers), of Świdnica-Ziębice during 1312–1322 (with his brother as co-ruler), and the sole Duke of Świdnica from 1322 until his death.

He was the second son of Bolko I the Strict, Duke of Jawor-Lwówek-Świdnica-Ziębice, by his wife Beatrix, daughter of Otto V the Long, Margrave of Brandenburg-Salzwedel.

== Life ==
The death of his older brother Bolko (30 January 1300) made him the heir apparent to the Duchy and future Head of the family. Twenty-three months later (9 November 1301), the unexpected death of his father left Bernard as ruler of all his domains, together with his younger brothers Henry I and Bolko II as co-rulers. However, because the three princes are minors, their guardianship was taken over by their maternal uncle Herman, Margrave of Brandenburg-Salzwedel, who also held the regency of the Duchy until 1305, when Bernard was proclaimed an adult and took by himself the government and the custody of his brothers.

In 1312 the first division of the Duchy was made between Bernard and his brothers: Henry I obtained Jawor and Lwówek; Bernard and Bolko II retained Świdnica and Ziębice as co-rulers. Bernard and Bolko II ruled together until 1322, when the second and final division of the Duchy was made: Bolko II received Ziębice and Bernard kept Świdnica.

In foreign politics, Bernard became the guardian of the independence of his sovereignty against his powerful neighbors. The marriage of his sister Beatrix to Duke Louis IV of Bavaria (later German King and Holy Roman Emperor) in 1308 give Bernard a powerful alliance. Two years later, in 1310, Bernard's marriage to Kunigunde, daughter of Władysław I the Elbow-high re-enforced his bonds with the Kingdom of Poland.

In 1311 Bernard took part in the negotiations in Olomouc as a mediator between Duke Bolesław III the Generous of Legnica and King John of Bohemia for the possession of the Duchy of Opawa (Troppau). The dispute ended in a compromise: King John took the Duchy, but had to pay 8,000 fines to Bolesław III as compensation. The contact with the Duke of Legnica allowed him to retake Niemcza.

In the early years of the 1320s, Bernard was involved in an alliance with Władysław I the Elbow-high in a war against the Dukes of Głogów. In the battle of Mühldorf of 1322, Bernard fought with King John and Louis IV, now King of Germany. Shortly afterwards he left for Masuria, where he took part in the expedition organized by the Teutonic Knights against Lithuania.

Bernard died on 6 May 1326 and was buried in Grüssau Abbey. His effective government helped to increase the power of his Duchy, which allowed his son Bolko II to become the last (and most notorious) independent ruler of the Piast dynasty.

== Marriage and issue ==
In 1310, Bernard married Kunigunde (c. 1298 – 9 April 1331), daughter of Władysław I the Elbow-high, Duke of Kuyavia and since 1320 King of Poland. They had five children:

1. Bolko II the Small (c. 1312 – 28 July 1368).
2. Constance (c. 1313 – by 21 November 1363), married by March 1326 to Duke Przemko II of Głogów.
3. Elisabeth (c. 1315 – 8/9 February 1348), married by 6 May 1326 to Duke Bolko II of Opole.
4. Henry II (c. 1316 – by 28 June 1345).
5. Beata (c. 1320 – after 9 April 1331).

Preceded by Bolko I the Strict	Duke of Świdnica with Henry I (until 1312) and Bolko II (until 1322); 1301–1326	Succeeded by Bolko II the Small and Henry II
Preceded by Bolko I the Strict	Duke of Jawor with Henry I and Bolko II; 1301–1312	Succeeded by Henry I
Preceded by Bolko I the Strict	Duke of Lwówek with Henry I and Bolko II; 1301–1312	Succeeded by Henry I
Preceded by Bolko I the Strict	Duke of Ziębice with Henry I (until 1312) and Bolko II; 1291–1322	Succeeded by Bolko II
