= Constance of Świdnica =

Silesian noblewoman

Constance of Świdnica (c. 1313 – 21 November 1363) was a member of the Piast dynasty in the Świdnica-Jawor branch and by marriage Duchess of Głogów.

She was the second child but eldest daughter of Duke Bernard of Świdnica by his wife Kunigunde, daughter of Władysław I the Elbow-high, later King of Poland.

== Life ==
=== Marriage ===
In March 1326, Constance had married with Duke Przemko II of Głogów. This union brought Przemko II closer to Constance's powerful grandfather, Władysław I the Elbow-high.

After five years of childless union, Przemko II died suddenly on 11 January 1331, allegedly poisoned by his own vassals. The late Duke's three surviving brothers divided Przemko II's lands between them. Constance received the city of Glogów as her dower, according to her husband's will. Soon after, she entered the Poor Clares monastery of Stary Sącz, where she became abbess.

=== Widowhood ===
In September 1331, King John of Bohemia began his siege of the Duchy. By October, he had captured the city of Głogów. Constance was forced to take refuge in the court of his grandparents, the Polish King and Queen, and Jan of Ścinawa (one of Przemko II's brothers) was compelled to sell his rights over half of the Duchy to the Bohemian King for 2,000 fines.

Constance was virtually left without financial support after the loss of her lands; however, her situation soon changed: first when she received a rent by her lands and later in 1336, when her grandmother Queen Jadwiga settled her residence definitely in Stary Sącz and took the veil. The Queen clearly favored her granddaughter, supported her in all ways.

After almost thirty years, in 1360, the Bohemian Kingdom finally recognized Constance's rights as widow of Przemko II. She received half of Głogów as her dower (the other half was already given to the Dukes of Żagań in 1349). Constance ruled effectively for only one year: in 1361 she renounced to her lands on behalf of her brother Bolko II the Small.

Constance died on 21 November 1363 and was buried in the monastery of Stary Sącz. After almost 150 years of separation, all the Duchy of Glogów was reunited in 1480 by Duke Jan II the Mad.

== Sources ==
- Genealogy of the Dukes of Świdnica

Constance of Świdnica House of Piast Born: c. 1313 Died: 21 November 1363
Preceded by Direct sovereignty of the Kingdom of Bohemia last holder Henry I	Duke of Glogów (1/2); 1360–1361	Succeeded by Bolko II the Small
