= Henry II of Świdnica =

Henry II
- Duke of Świdnica
- Coat-of-arms of Świdnica
- Born: c. 1316
- Died: c. 28 June 1345
- Noble family: Silesian Piasts
- Spouse: Katharina of Hungary
- Issue: Anna von Schweidnitz
- Father: Bernard of Świdnica
- Mother: Kunigunde of Poland

Henry II of Świdnica, (Polish: Henryk II Świdnicki, Czech: Jindřich Svídnický, German: Heinrich II. von Schweidnitz; c. 1316 – c. 28 June 1345), was a Duke of Świdnica from 1326 until his death (with his brother as co-ruler).

He was the second and younger son of Duke Bernard of Świdnica by his wife Kunigunde, daughter of Władysław I the Elbow-high, Duke of Kuyavia and since 1320 King of Poland.

== Life ==
Henry's exact date of birth is unknown, but was assumed that he was significantly younger than his older brother Bolko II the Small, because he was first mentioned only in 1337. He co-ruled with his brother since 1326 after their father's death, but at the end Bolko II take all the government into his hands.

== Marriage and issue ==
By 1 June 1338 Henry II married with Katharina (d. bef. 29 June 1355), daughter of King Charles I of Hungary, from the House of Capet in the Anjou branch. They had only one daughter:

1. Anna (b. 1339 - d. Prague, 11 July 1362), married on 27 May 1353 with Charles IV of Luxembourg, King of Bohemia and Holy Roman Emperor.

The birth of his daughter, future Holy Roman Empress, was the only important event of Henry II's life, according to the contemporary chronicles. He died by 28 June 1345. It's unknown where he was buried.

== Literature ==
- Joachim Bahlcke, Schlesien und die Schlesier, Langen-Müller-Verlag, 2000, ISBN 3-7844-2781-2 (in German)
- H. Grünhagen: Geschichte Schlesiens, Breslau 1878 (in German)
- Heinrich II. (Schweidnitz). In: Allgemeine Deutsche Biographie (ADB). Band 11, Duncker & Humblot, Leipzig 1880, S. 615. (in German)

Henry II of Świdnica House of Piast Born: c. 1316 Died: c. 28 June 1345
Preceded by Bernard	Duke of Świdnica with Bolko II; 1326–1345	Succeeded by Bolko II the Small
