= Przemko II of Głogów =

Przemko II of Głogów (c. 1305 – 11 January 1331) was a Duke of Żagań, Ścinawa, etc., from 1309 to 1321 (with his brothers as co-rulers), Duke of Oleśnica, Namysłów, Gniezno and Kalisz from 1309 to 1312 (with his brothers as co-ruler) and Duke of Głogów starting in 1318 (until 1321 with his brother, then alone).

He was the fifth and youngest son of Henry III (I), Duke of Głogów, by his wife Matilda, daughter of Albert I, Duke of Brunswick-Lüneburg.

== Life ==
=== Early years ===
After his father's death in 1309, Przemko II succeeded him in all his lands with his brothers as co-rulers; however, because he was a child at that time, he moved with his mother Matilda to her dower, Glogów. His formal guardianship was held by his older brothers.

=== First divisions of the Duchy. Loss of Greater Poland ===
In 1312 was made the formal division of the Duchy. Przemko II, along with older brothers Henry IV the Faithful and Jan received Żagań, Ścinawa and Poznań as co-rulers. However, two years later, as a result of the disputes with Władysław I the Elbow-high, they lost all the Greater Poland lands, except the districts around the Obra River.

=== Inheritance of Glogów. Marriage ===
In 1318, his mother Matilda died, and Przemko II, with his older brother Henry IV inherited Glogów (since 1317, Jan was an independent Duke of Ścinawa). The final division of the lands was made in 1321, when Przemko II became the independent ruler Duke of Glogów. Little is known about his reign. On 29 July 1326, he concluded an agreement with the brothers Henry IV and Jan, according to which if one of them died without male issue, the other two inherited his land.

Przemko II, however, didn't intend to abandon the idea of have his own offspring, because by March 1326, he had already married with Constance (b. ca. 1313 - d. by 21 November 1363), daughter of Duke Bernard of Świdnica. Thanks to this union, Przemko II became more closer to Władysław I the Elbow-high: he was the maternal grandfather of Constance.

=== Resistance against the politics of King John of Bohemia ===
Around 1327, King John of Bohemia began to openly pressure the Silesian Dukes to paid homage to him. This time was particularly difficult for the Duke of Glogów, specially after 1329, when he was the only of Henry III's sons who refused to paid tribute to the Bohemian King. According to the "Chronicle of the Princes of Poland" (Kronikę książąt polskich), he says that prefers to renounce to his inheritance than to be subjected to a foreign ruler. The punishment for his resistance against King John was the deposition of Przemko II from his lands in favor of his brothers.

== Death and Aftermaths ==
Przemko II died unexpectedly on 11 January 1331 aged less than thirty years and was buried in Glogów. There are some assumptions about the circumstances of his sudden death: the "Chronicle of the Princes of Poland" stated that the Duke was poisoned by their own vassals. However, it's unknown if the perpetrators of the crime were punished. It's assumed that the reason behind the premature death of Przemko II was his reckless politics over the duchy.

Przemko II's widow Constance received the city of Glogów as her dower and, according to the treaty of 1326, his brother Henry IV and Jan divided between them the rest of his lands. However, by September 1331, King John of Bohemia appeared before the city walls, and began the siege. Without chances of an effective defense, the city capitulated on 2 October, and all the Duchy of Glogów was incorporated into the Kingdom of Bohemia. Constance was forced to refuge in the court of his grandparents, the Polish King and Queen, and Jan of Ścinawa was compelled to sell his rights over half of the Duchy to the Bohemian King for 2,000 grzywna. Eventually, only the half of Glogów was recovered by Henry IV's son, Henry V of Iron, in 1349. After almost 150 years of separation, all the Duchy of Glogów was reunited in 1480 by Duke Jan II the Mad.

Przemko II of Głogów House of Piast Born: c. 1305 Died: 11 January 1331
Preceded by Henry III	Duke of Żagań with Henry IV, Konrad I (until 1312), Bolesław (until 1312) and Jan; 1309–1321	Succeeded by Henry IV the Faithful
Preceded by Henry III	Duke of Ścinawa with Henry IV, Konrad I (until 1312), Bolesław (until 1312) and Jan; 1309–1317	Succeeded by Jan
Preceded by Henry III	Duke of Oleśnica with Henry IV, Konrad I, Bolesław and Jan; 1309–1312	Succeeded by Konrad I and Bolesław
Preceded by Henry III	Duke of Namysłów with Henry IV, Konrad I, Bolesław and Jan; 1309–1312	Succeeded by Konrad I and Bolesław
Preceded by Henry III	Duke of Kalisz with Henry IV, Konrad I, Bolesław and Jan; 1309–1312	Succeeded by Konrad I and Bolesław
Preceded by Henry III	Duke of Gniezno with Henry IV, Konrad I, Bolesław and Jan; 1309–1312	Succeeded by Konrad I and Bolesław
Preceded by Henry III	Duke of Poznań with Henry IV, Konrad I (until 1312), Bolesław (until 1312) and Jan; 1309–1314	Succeeded by Władysław I the Elbow-high
Preceded by Matilda	Duke of Glogów with Henry IV (until 1321); 1318–1331	Succeeded by Annexed by the Kingdom of Bohemia next holder Henry I
