= Helenesee station =

Railway station in Frankfurt, Germany

Helenesee
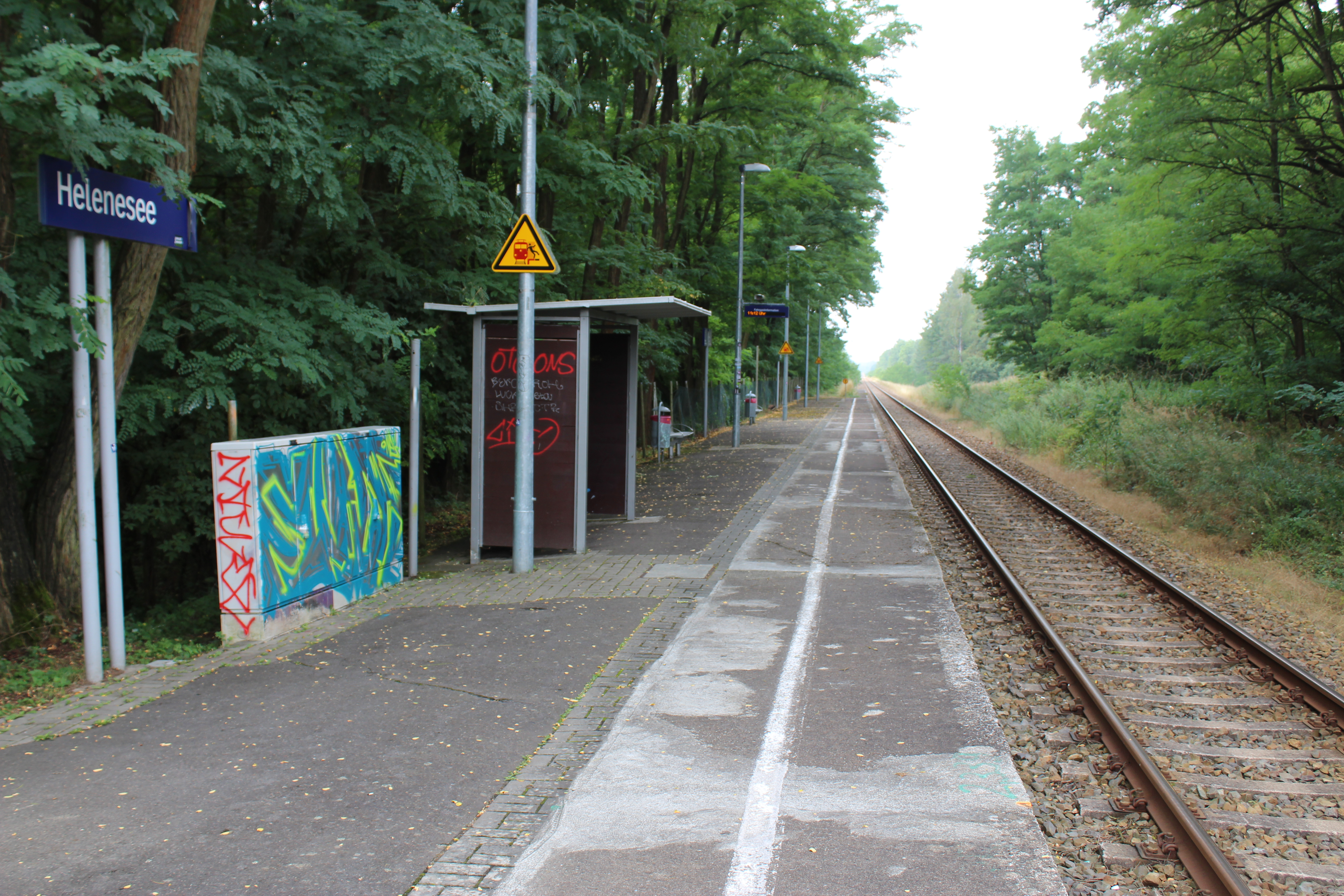
- 2019

General information
- Location: Im Wald; 15236 Frankfurt (Oder); Brandenburg; Germany
- Coordinates: 52.2796°N 14.4793°E
- System: Hp
- Owner: Deutsche Bahn
- Operator: DB Station&Service
- Lines: Cottbus–Frankfurt (Oder) railway (KBS 209.36)
- Platforms: 1 side platform
- Tracks: 1
- Train operators: NEB

Other information
- Station code: 2672
- DS100 code: BHEL
- IBNR: 8011853
- Category: 7
- Fare zone: VBB: Frankfurt (Oder) B/6073
- Website: www.bahnhof.de

Services
Preceding station	Niederbarnimer Eisenbahn	Following station
Müllrose towards Königs Wusterhausen	RB 36	Frankfurt (Oder)-Neuberesinchen towards Frankfurt (Oder)
Location
- Location within Brandenburg

Helenesee station is a railway station near the Helenesee, located in Frankfurt (Oder), Brandenburg, Germany.

== Notable places nearby ==
- Helenesee
