= Käthe Mende =

German sociologist

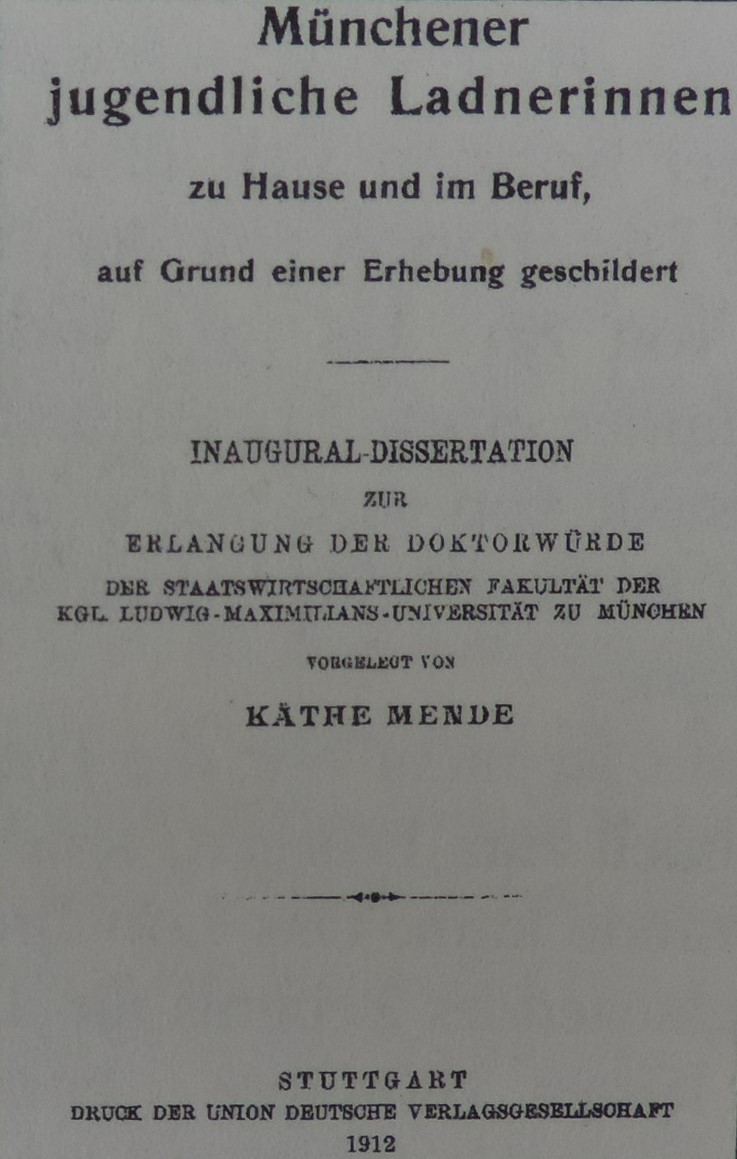
- Cover of Mende's doctoral thesis
- Born: 2 December 1878; Frankfurt an der Oder, Prussia, German Empire
- Died: 9 August 1963 (aged 84)

Academic background
- Education: Ludwig-Maximilians-Universität München
- Thesis: Münchener jugendliche Ladnerinnen zu Haus und im Beruf, auf Grund einer Erhebung geschildert
- Doctoral advisor: Lujo Brentano

Academic work
- Discipline: Sociology

Käthe Mende (2 December 1878 – 9 August 1963) was a German sociologist. Born into an Orthodox Jewish family, she gained a doctorate under the German economist Lujo Brentano. Most of her professional life was based in Berlin, where she engaged in social work. Mende has been described as a "pioneer of youth welfare services" by the historian Luise Hirsch.

== Life ==
Mende was born in the German-Polish border town Frankfurt an der Oder. She grew up in an Orthodox Jewish household as the daughter of a banker. Her mother died when Mende was 18 years old. Following the insistence of her father, Mende was only later allowed to study at a Gymnasium after she had attended a traditionally female "Lehrerinnenseminar". Mende finally attended the University of Freiburg, Humboldt University of Berlin, and the Ludwig-Maximilians-Universität München during the time period 1897–1912. Her university subjects were politics, philosophy and law.

Mende obtained a doctorate degree with Lujo Brentano, graduating with a dissertation entitled "Münchener jugendliche Ladnerinnen zu Hause und im Beruf, auf Grund einer Erhebung geschildert". The doctoral dissertation was of a sociological nature and analysed the private and professional lives of young female shopkeepers in Munich. Today it is thought to be one of the earliest sociological analyses in Germany.

After graduating, Mende moved to Berlin, where she was soon working for social institutions caring for the youth. She was further engaged in talks surrounding the rewriting of the legal basis for the welfare of the youth. Mende was described to be a "pioneer of youth welfare services" by the historian Luise Hirsch. When the National Socialists came to power, Mende was fired from her positions. She declined to flee Germany, however, as she felt that those Jews who worked in welfare services, "like soldiers, had to remain at their posts until the end". She proceeded to volunteer for Jewish organisations, including the League of Jewish Women. In 1942, she was deported to the KZ Theresienstadt, from which she was freed in August 1945. While there she helped take care of the sickly. Mende immediately returned to Berlin and resumed working in social work, including for the US-American military's welfare office. She co-founded the Neighbourhood Centre Schöneberg e.V.

== Works ==
- Münchener jugendliche Ladnerinnen zu Hause und im Beruf, auf Grund einer Erhebung geschildert (1912)
- Das Vorkommen und Schicksal der Unehelichen unter den Juden in Deutschland. Vorläufige Ergebnisse einer Erhebung, Frankfurt 1936
- Dreihundert Fälle der Jugendgerichtshilfe in Berlin-Neukölln 1948 und 1953, Hamburg 1958

Mende further wrote a 90-page memoir in 1950, which was discovered in 2018 in an archive in New York. She features in the bibliographical historical work "Wir Mendes".

== Literature ==
- Doris Bonk: Käthe Mende und ihr Beitrag für die jüdische Sozialarbeit, Munich 2003
- Beate Bussiek: Mende, Käthe, in: Hugo Maier (author): "Who is Who der Sozialen Arbeit". Freiburg : Lambertus, 1998 ISBN 3-7841-1036-3, S. 390f.
- Mende, Käthe, in: Joseph Walk (author): "Kurzbiographien zur Geschichte der Juden" 1918–1945. Munich : Saur, 1988, ISBN 3-598-10477-4, S. 262
- Hirsch, Luise: "From the Shtetl to the Lecture Hall: Jewish Women and Cultural Exchange"
- Bamberger, Max: "Wir Mendes"
