= Lucie Hein =

East German politician (1910–1965)

Lucie Hein (25 September 1910 – 15 September 1965) was an East German politician (SED). Between 1960 and 1965 she served as the senior mayor of Frankfurt.

== Life ==
Lucie Hein was born in Rüdersdorf then a short distance outside Berlin on its eastern side. Her father worked as a foreman in the town's cement works. Her mother worked in a factory. She attended school in Rüdersdorf and then, later, in Petershagen. In 1925/26 she attended a commercial academy in Berlin where she trained as a typist. In 1926 she took work as a typist with the Max Levy company in Berlin. She undertook similar work with a succession of companies in Berlin and Petershagen till 1934 which is when she married a Berlin tobacco goods trader, after which she worked in her husband's business. Between 1941 and 1945 she is listed as a housewife. Her husband was killed on the Eastern Front in August 1944.

Between 1945 and 1952 she was installed in the council at Petershagen, working successively as a secretary, a senior clerk and head of the personnel department. Since the end of the war in May 1945 this entire portion of central Germany had been administered as the Soviet occupation zone (relaunched in October 1949 as the Soviet sponsored German Democratic Republic (East Germany). April 1946 saw the contentious creation of a new political party, the Socialist Unity Party ("Sozialistische Einheitspartei Deutschlands" / SED), later the ruling party for a new kind of German one-party dictatorship. Lucie Hein joined the party in 1947. In February 1951 she became the mayor of Petershagen.

In March 1951 she was selected to attend a three-month course at the regional party academy in Wandlitz. Between 1952 and 1960 she worked for the regional party leadership team ("Bezirksleitung") for the Frankfurt (Oder) region, becoming a political instructor. During this time she also took a one-year course of study at the Walter Ulbricht Academy for Public and Legal Sciences, following which she was employed as personal assistant the Frankfurt regional leadership team Party First Secretary with responsibility for governance, bloc parties and church affairs.

On 7 June 1960 she was appointed senior mayor of Frankfurt (Oder) in succession to Else Noack. Noack had been the city's first female mayor. Lucie Hein was the second. She remained in office till her death on 15 September 1965. Her period as mayor saw the start of Frankfurt's transformation into a "socialist city". The building of Karl Marx Street was progressed: it was completed in 1968. New high-rise residential apartment blocks were constructed in the inner city, along with the Winzerring development and the development at Baumschulenweg. Redevelopment at this time also involved blowing up the old university buildings in order to replace them.
