= Anne Pätzke =

German illustrator and writer (born 1982)

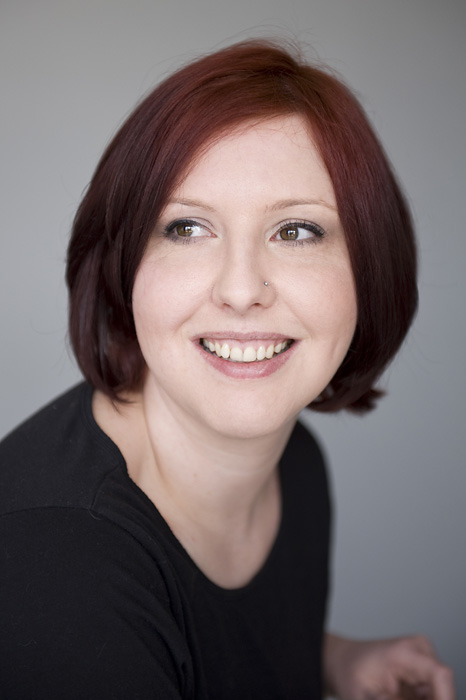
- Born: 1982 (age 43–44); Frankfurt an der Oder, East Germany
- Known for: Illustration, writing

Anne Pätzke (born 1982) is a German illustrator and writer.

She was born in Frankfurt on the Oder River and studied painting at the Rosengarten school and graphic design in Berlin. She lives and works in Berlin. Pätzke has created art for a number of board games including Space Mission and Carcassonne. She has also created video tutorials for comic artists.

Her artwork also appears as plush toys and on mugs, calendars and bookmarks.

== Selected work ==
- Kulla, children's literature (2006)
- Kulla und die Wunschblume, children's literature (2008)
- Kulla und der Schneemann, children's literature (2008)
- Kulla und der Mondhase, children's literature (2009)
- Bound - The Contract, online comic (since 2019)
