= Müllrose station =

Railway station in Germany

Müllrose
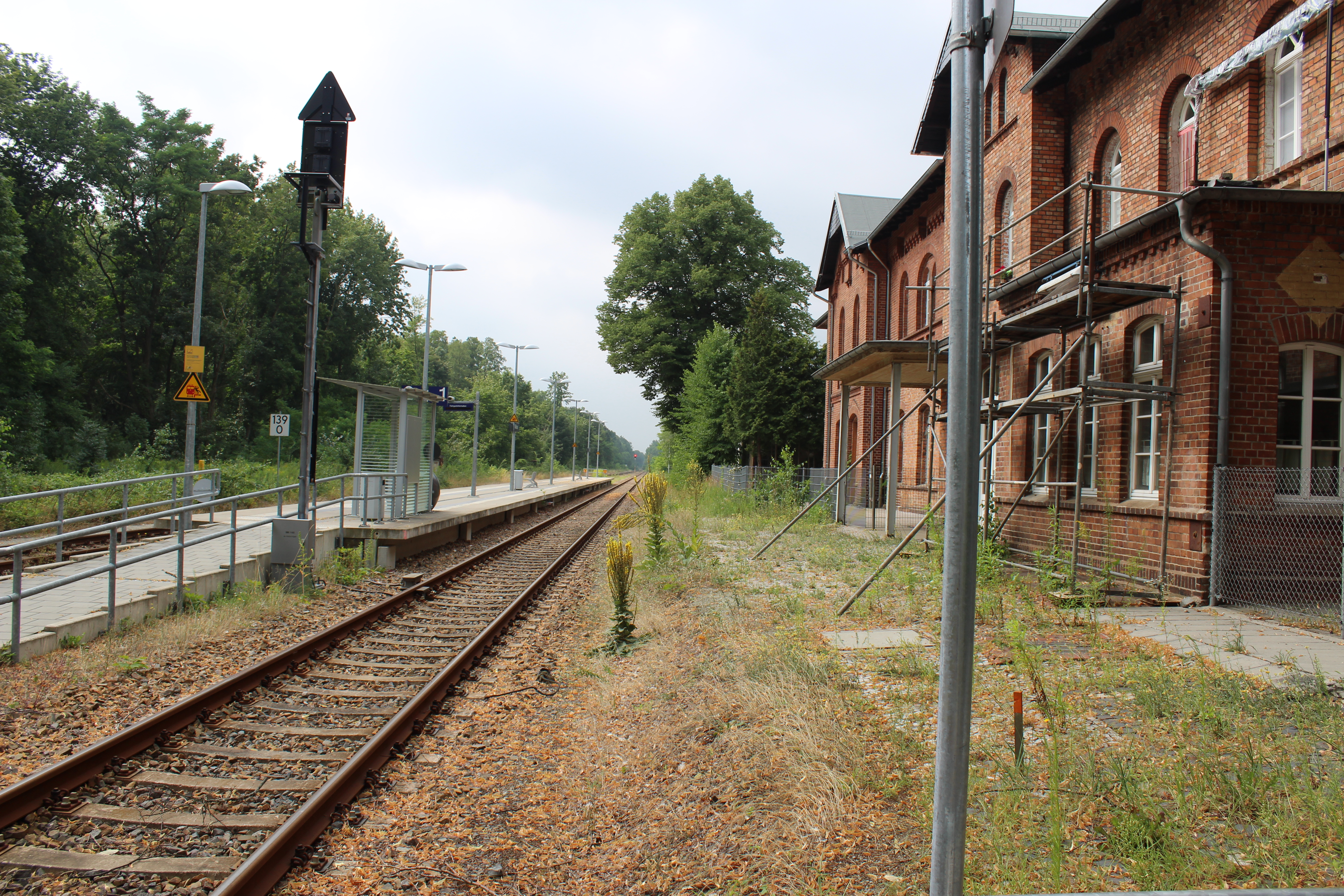
- 2019

General information
- Location: Bahnhof 61; 15299 Müllrose; Brandenburg; Germany
- Coordinates: 52.2421°N 14.4341°E
- System: Bf
- Owner: Deutsche Bahn
- Operator: DB Station&Service
- Lines: Cottbus–Frankfurt (Oder) railway (KBS 209.36)
- Platforms: 1 island platform
- Tracks: 2
- Train operators: NEB
- Connections: RB 36

Other information
- Station code: 4224
- DS100 code: BMR
- IBNR: 8012400
- Category: 6
- Fare zone: VBB: Frankfurt (Oder) C/6171
- Website: www.bahnhof.de

Services
Preceding station	Niederbarnimer Eisenbahn	Following station
Mixdorf towards Königs Wusterhausen	RB 36	Helenesee towards Frankfurt (Oder)
Location
- Location within Brandenburg

Müllrose station is a railway station in the municipality of Müllrose, located in the Oder-Spree district in Brandenburg, Germany.
