= Hohenwalde =

Coordinates: 52°17′02″N 14°26′05″E

Hohenwalde is an Ortsteil of Frankfurt (Oder), Brandenburg, Germany, with a population of 425.

The town of Müllrose is also close by.
