= Helenesee =

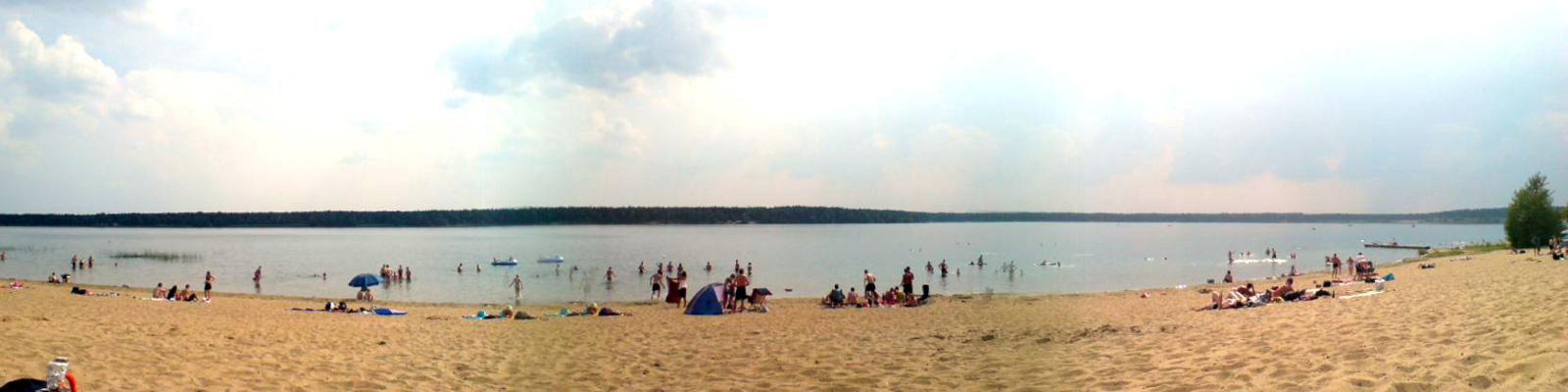

- Location within Brandenburg
- Location: Brandenburg
- Coordinates: 52°16′16″N 14°29′15″E
- Type: artificial lake
- Basin countries: Germany
- Max. length: ca. 2.5 km (1.6 mi)
- Max. width: 0.9 km (0.56 mi)
- Surface area: ca. 250 ha (620 acres)
- Max. depth: 56.63 m (185.8 ft)

Helenesee is a lake in Brandenburg, Germany. Its surface area is ca. 250 ha. With a depth of 56.63 m, the Helenseee is the second deepest lake in Brandenburg, only surpassed by the lake Großer Stechlinsee. It is situated approximately 8 kilometers in the south of Frankfurt (Oder). It was formed after the flooding of a former open-pit mining which started in 1958.
