= Frankfurt (Oder) =

Town in Brandenburg, Germany

Frankfurt an der Oder
- Town
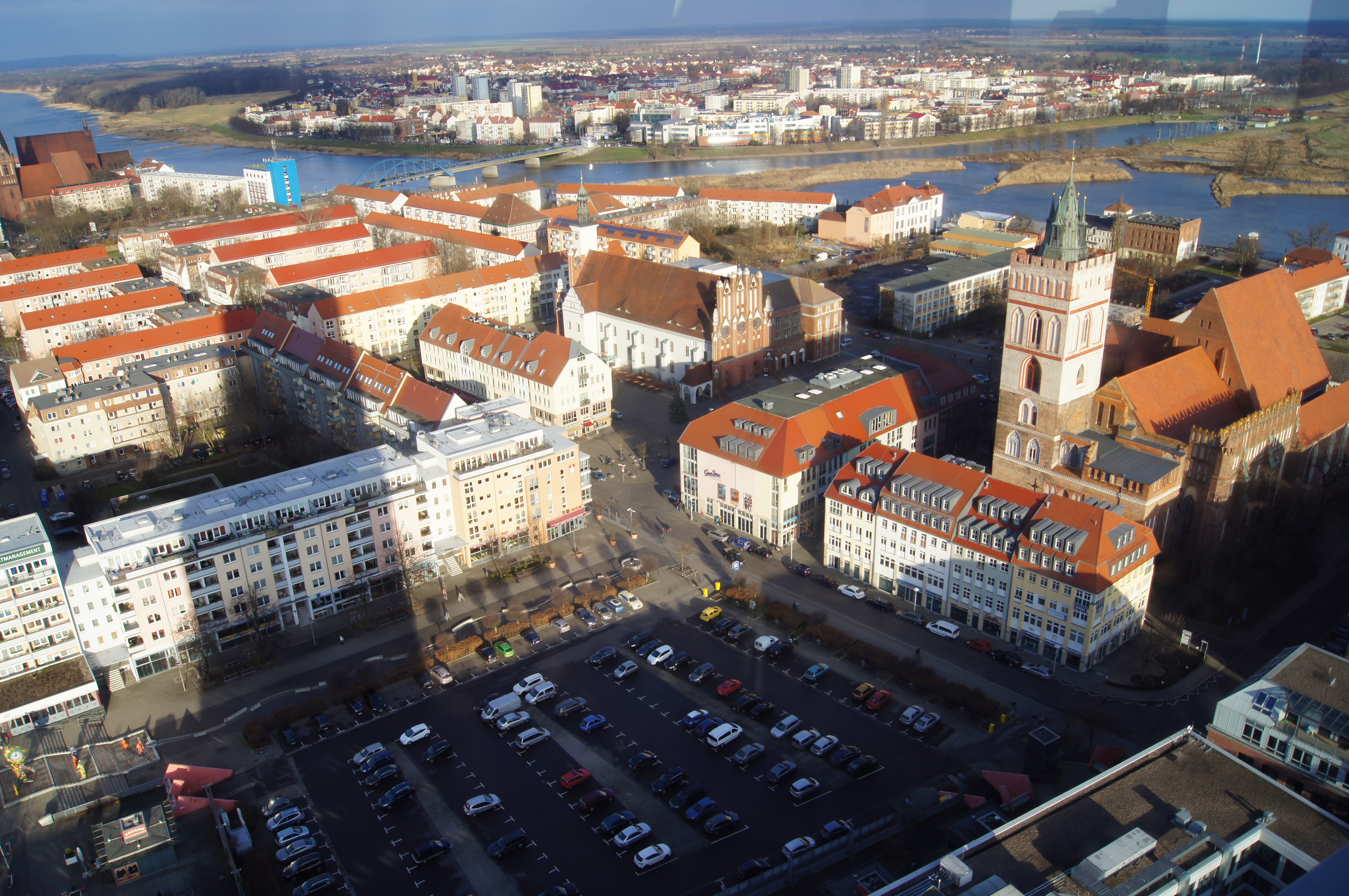
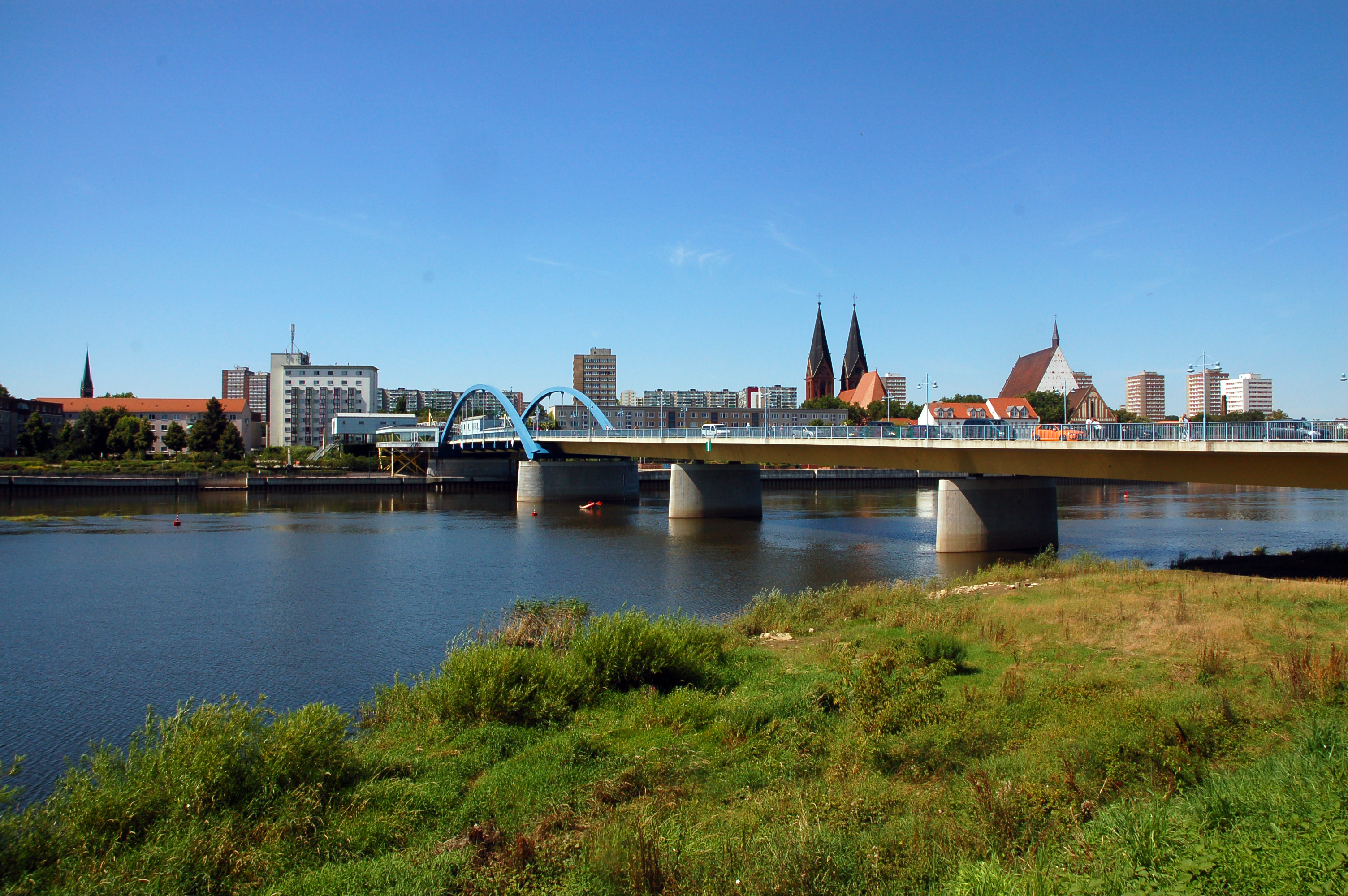
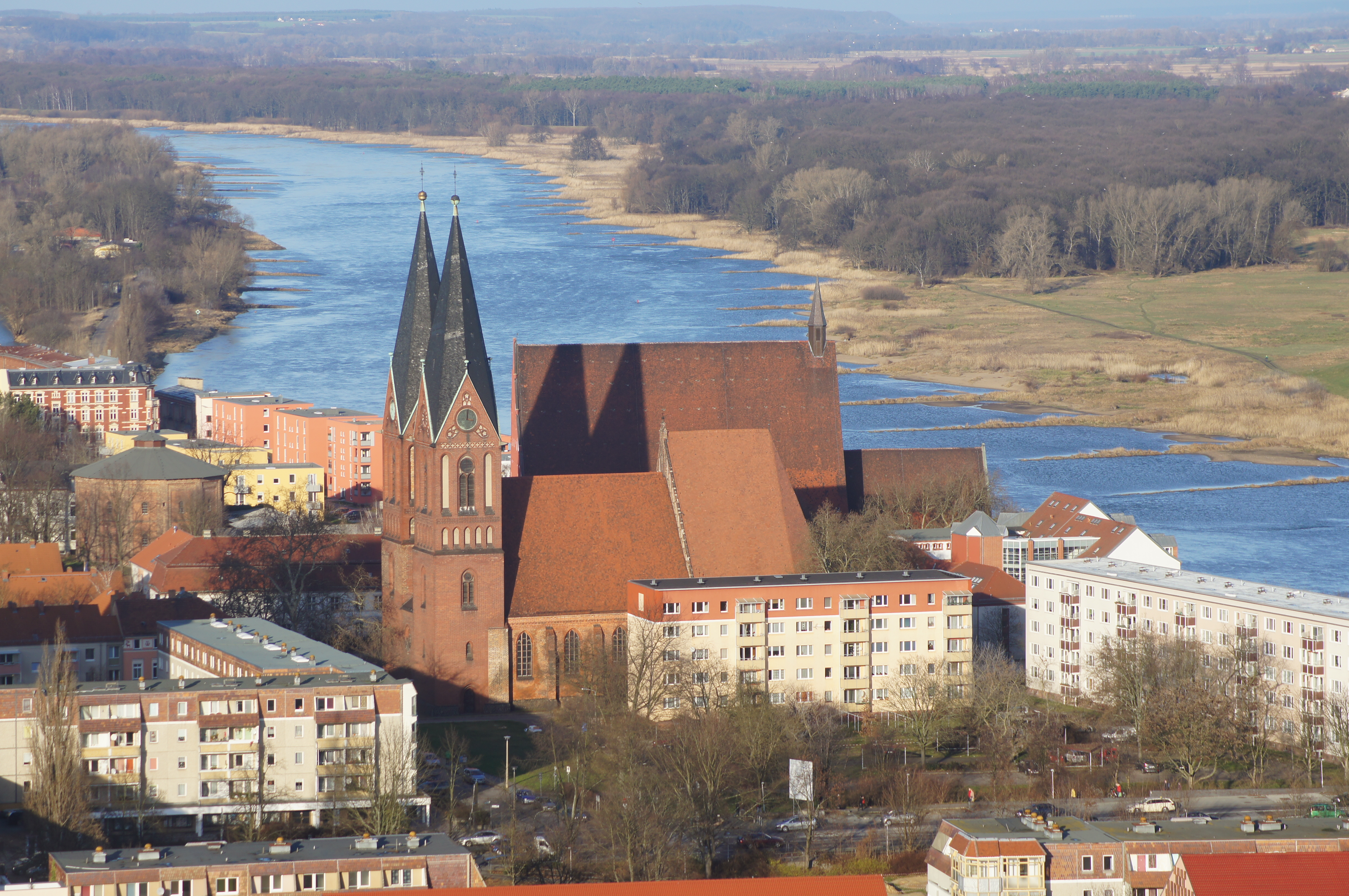
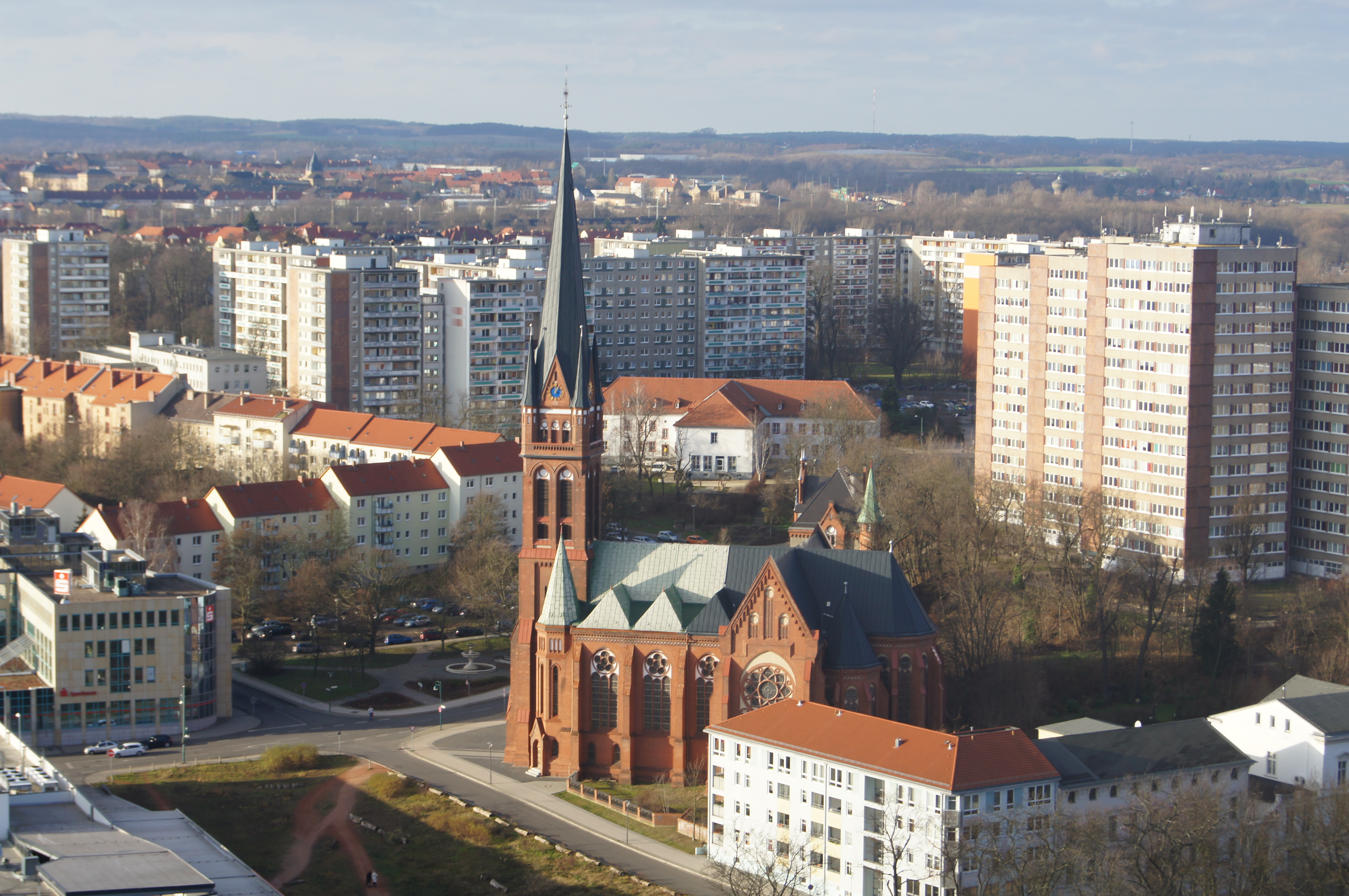
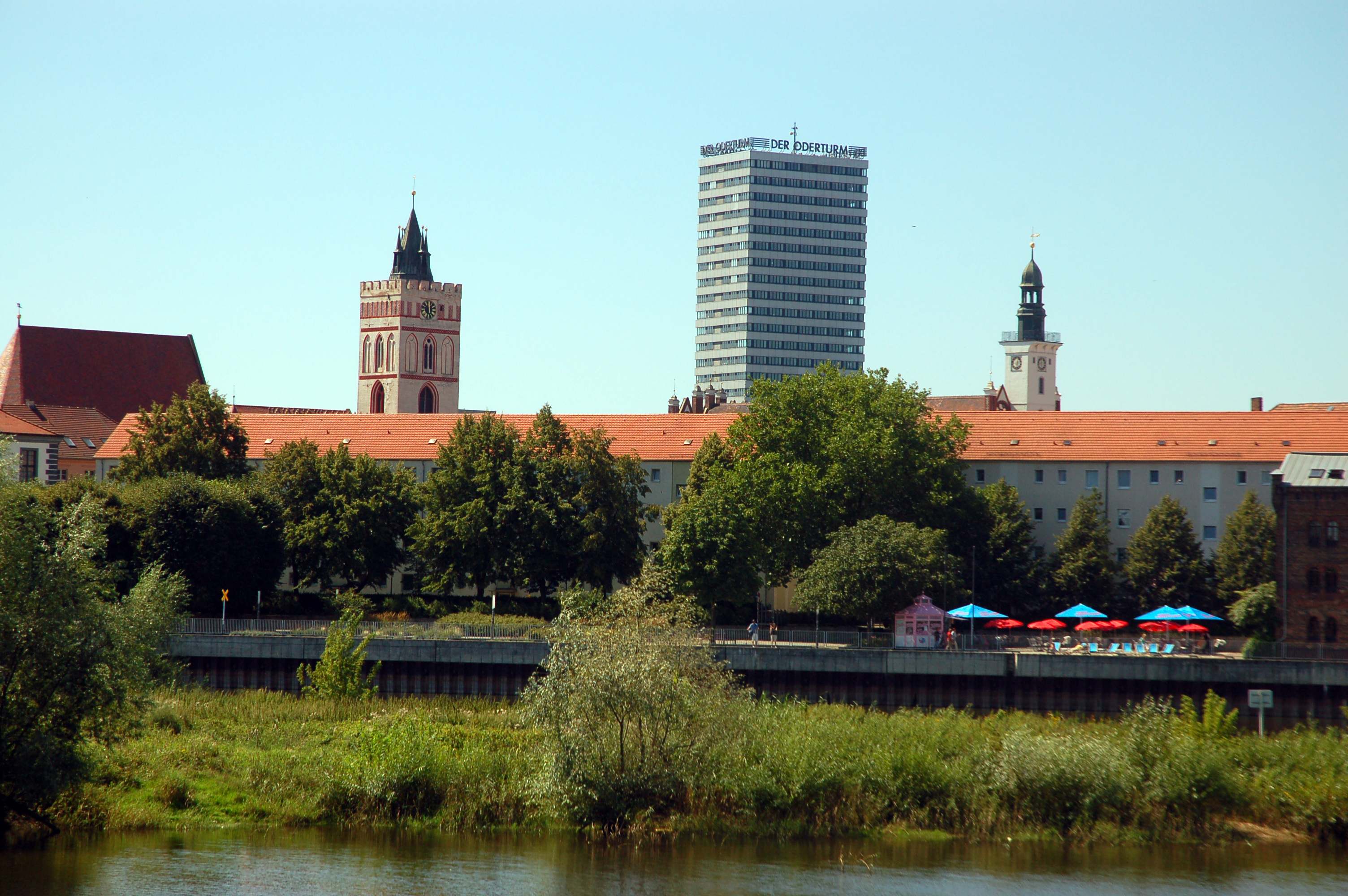
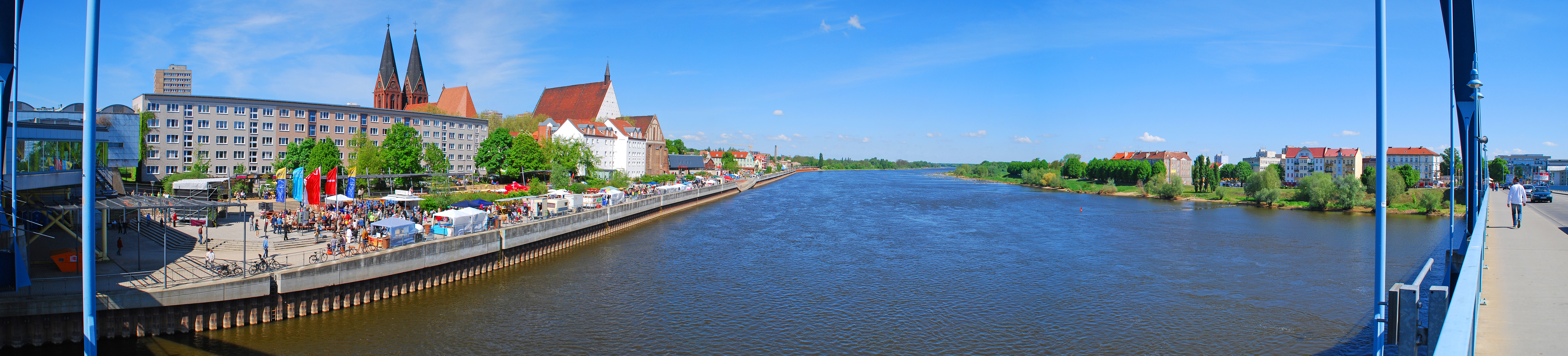
- Clockwise from top: St Mary's Church, Church of Peace, skyline with St Mary's, Oder Tower and city hall, view of the Oder from City Bridge, St Gertrude's Church, view of the city from Słubice

- Flag Coat of arms
- Interactive map of Frankfurt an der Oder
- Location within Germany Location within Brandenburg
- Coordinates: 52°20′31″N 14°33′06″E
- Country: Germany
- State: Brandenburg
- District: Urban district

Government
  - Mayor (2018–26): Axel Strasser (Ind.)

Area
  - Total: 147.61 km^{2} (56.99 sq mi)
- Elevation: 19–135 m (62–443 ft)

Population (2025-12-31)
  - Total: 56,586
  - Density: 383.35/km^{2} (992.87/sq mi)
- Time zone: UTC+01:00 (CET)
  - Summer (DST): UTC+02:00 (CEST)
- Postal codes: 15201–15236
- Dialling codes: 0335
- Vehicle registration: FF
- Website: www.frankfurt-oder.de

Frankfurt (Oder), also known as Frankfurt an der Oder (German: [ˈfʁaŋkfʊʁt ʔan deːɐ̯ ˈʔoːdɐ], lit. 'Frankfurt on the Oder'; Central Marchian: Frankfort an de Oder) is the fourth-largest city in the German state of Brandenburg after Potsdam, Cottbus and Brandenburg an der Havel. With around 58,000 inhabitants, it is the largest German city on the Oder River, and one of the easternmost cities in modern Germany. Frankfurt sits on the western bank of the Oder, opposite the Polish town of Słubice, which was a part of Frankfurt until 1945, and called Dammvorstadt until then. The city is about 80 kilometres (50 mi) east of Berlin, in the south of the historical region Lubusz Land. Within Frankfurt's city limits lies the recreational area Lake Helenesee.

The name of the city means Ford of the Franks, and a Gallic rooster appears in the coats of arms of both Frankfurt and Słubice. The official name Frankfurt (Oder) and the older Frankfurt an der Oder are used to distinguish it from the larger city of Frankfurt am Main (lit. 'Frankfurt on the Main').

The site of present-day Frankfurt originated as a West Slavic settlement on the Oder River. Following the eastward expansion of the Margraviate of Brandenburg in the 13th century, Frankfurt developed as a merchant town within Brandenburg. It received town privileges in 1253 and became an important trading center. After World War II, the eastern part of Frankfurt became part of Poland under the terms of the Potsdam Agreement and was renamed to Słubice, while the western part of Frankfurt became a border city of the German Democratic Republic in 1949.

During the communist era, Frankfurt reached a population peak with more than 87,000 inhabitants at the end of the 1980s. Following German reunification, the population decreased significantly, but has stabilized in recent years at about 58,000 inhabitants. As of 2020, the city plays an important role in German–Polish relations and European integration. Frankfurt is home to the European University Viadrina, which has a campus in Słubice, the Collegium Polonicum.

== History ==
=== Middle Ages ===
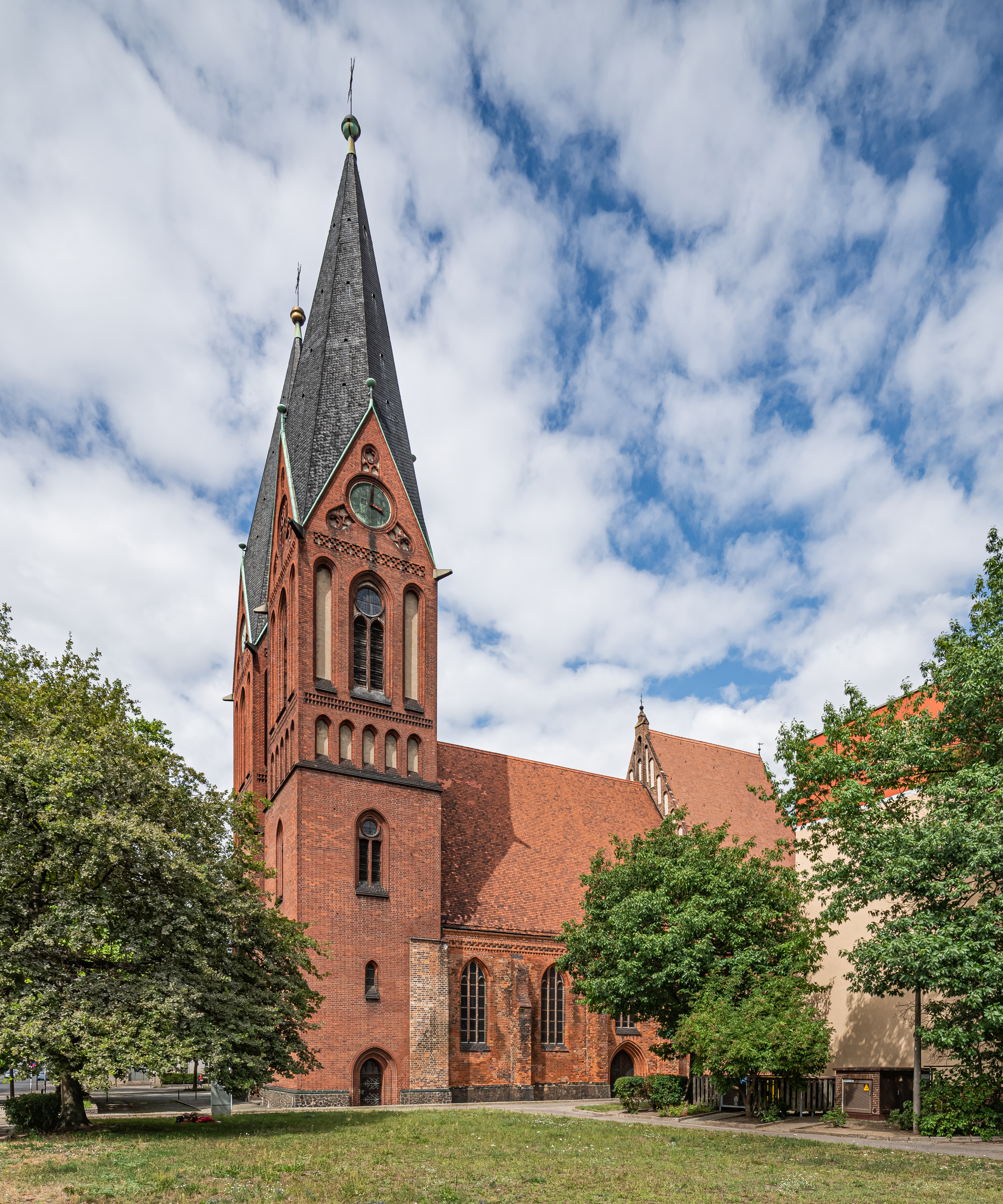
The Church of Peace, the city's oldest church, was founded under Polish rule and completed under German rule.

Prior to 1249, a West Slavic settlement named Zliwitz along with the Lubusz Land was part of the Kingdom of Poland. The Piast duke Henry the Bearded granted Zliwitz staple rights in 1225. In 1226, construction of the St. Nicholas Church (today's Friedenskirche) began. In 1249, the settlement became part of the Margraviate of Brandenburg.

The town of Frankfurt received its charter in 1253 at the Brandendamm. The early settlers lived on the western banks of the Oder; later the town was extended to the eastern bank. After a war broke out over control of the region in 1319, the town came under the control of the Duchy of Pomerania. In 1319, Wartislaw IV, Duke of Pomerania, granted new privileges to the town. The town fell again to Brandenburg in 1324. In the Late Middle Ages, the town dominated the river trade between Wrocław and Szczecin. In 1430, Frankfurt joined the Hanseatic League. In 1432, the Czech Hussites captured the town.

=== Modern era ===
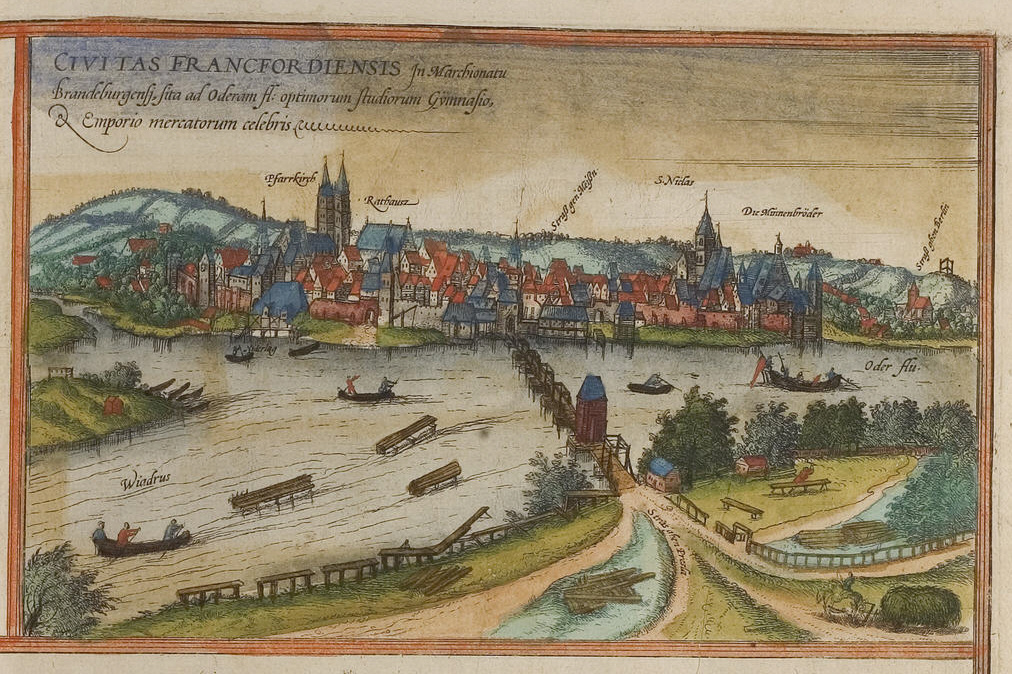
Frankfurt in the 16th century

In the 16th century, many Polish exports, including grain, wood, ash, tar and hemp, were floated from western Poland via Frankfurt to the port of Szczecin, with the high Brandenburgian customs duties on Polish goods lowered in the early 17th century.

In April 1631, during the Thirty Years' War, Frankfurt was the site of the Battle of Frankfurt an der Oder between the Swedish Empire and the Holy Roman Empire. After a two-day siege, Swedish forces, supported by Scottish auxiliaries, stormed the town and destroyed many buildings, e.g. the Georgen Hospital. The result was a Swedish victory. By the end of the Thirty Years' War, the town's population had decreased from 12,000 inhabitants to 2,366 inhabitants.

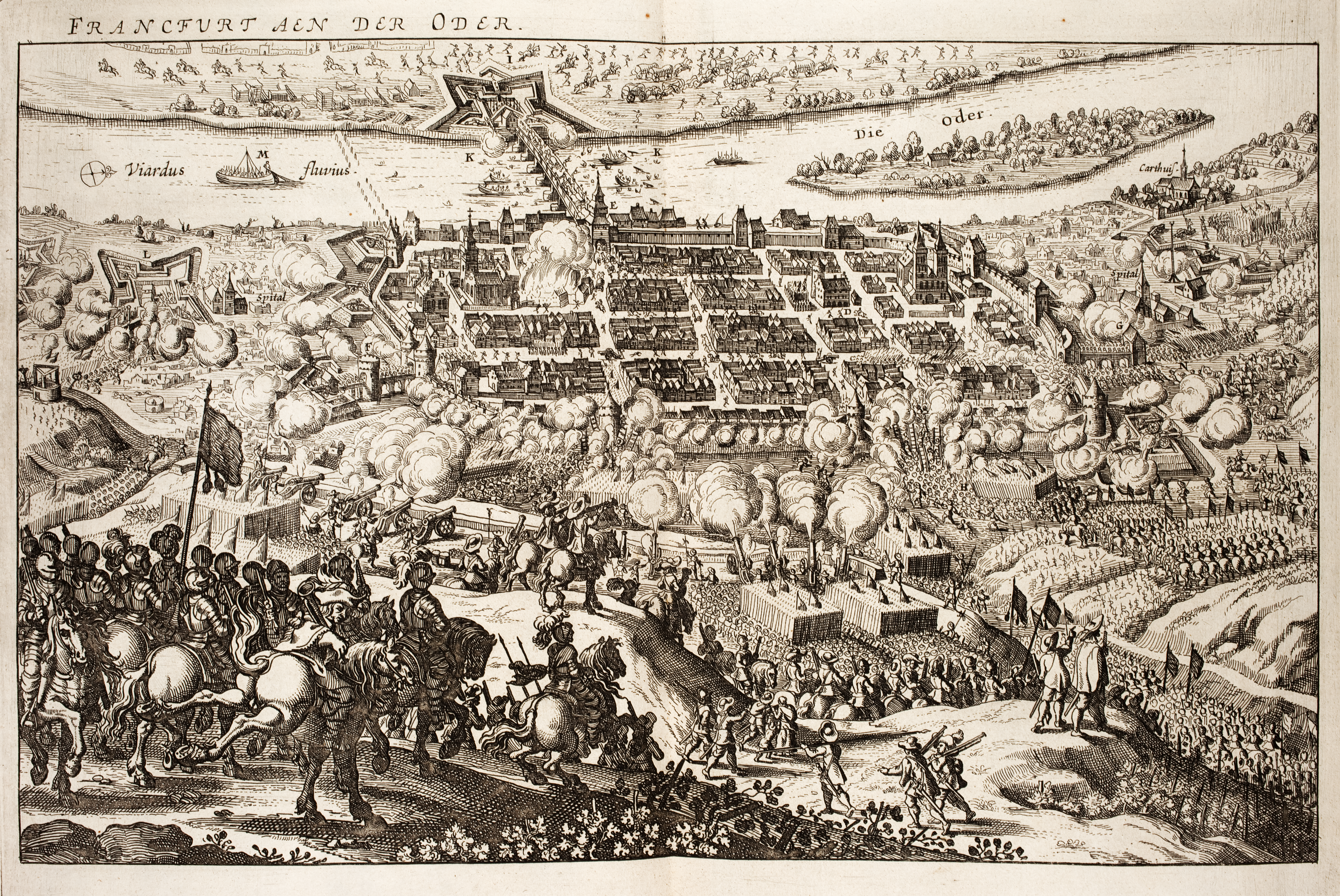
Battle of Frankfurt an der Oder

In the 16th century the oldest church of the town (today's Friedenskirche) was secularized and was even used as a granary, and from the 17th century it served as the church of the French Huguenots.

The city was briefly occupied by the Russian Imperial Army during the Seven Years' War, in August 1759, in the prelude to the battle of Kunersdorf.

With the dissolution of the Margraviate of Brandenburg during the Napoleonic Wars, Frankfurt became part of the Province of Brandenburg in 1815. In the 19th century, Frankfurt played an important role in trade. Centrally positioned in the Kingdom of Prussia between Berlin and Posen (Poznań), on the river Oder with its heavy traffic, the town housed the second-largest annual trade fair (Messe) of the German Reich, surpassed only by that in Leipzig. One of the main escape routes for insurgents of the unsuccessful Polish November Uprising from partitioned Poland to the Great Emigration led through the city. In 1842, the Berlin–Frankfurt (Oder) railway was opened.

=== World War II and recent history ===
The SS Einsatzgruppe VI was formed in the town before it entered several Polish cities, including Poznań, Kalisz and Leszno, to commit various crimes against Poles during the German invasion of Poland, which started World War II. During World War II the Germans brought numerous forced laborers, both men and women, from Poland and the Soviet Union to the town. In early 1945, death marches of prisoners of various nationalities from the dissolved camps in Żabikowo and Świecko to the Sachsenhausen concentration camp passed through the city. There was no fighting for the town in 1945 during World War II even though the town was declared a fortress (Festung) in an attempt to block the Red Army's route to Berlin. The nearly empty town was burned down by the Red Army. The postwar East German–Polish border ran along the Oder, separating the Dammvorstadt on the eastern bank – which became the Polish town of Słubice – from the rest of Frankfurt. While part of communist East Germany, Frankfurt was administered within Bezirk Frankfurt (Oder). It became part of the reconstituted state of Brandenburg with German reunification in 1990.

In the post-communist era, following the collapse of its main employer VEB Halbleiterwerk, Frankfurt has suffered from high unemployment and low economic growth. Its population has fallen significantly from around 87,000 at the time of German reunification in 1990. The only remnant of semiconductor technology industries in Frankfurt by 2003 was the Innovations for High Performance Microelectronics (IHPM) institute.

Today, the towns of Frankfurt and Słubice have friendly relations and run several common projects and facilities. Poland joined the European Union on 1 May 2004, and implemented the Schengen Agreement on 21 December 2007 leading to the removal of permanent border controls.

In March 2008, the Jewish community of Frankfurt celebrated its first Torah dedication since the Holocaust. The procession of the new Torah scroll began from the spot where the town's Frankfurter Synagogue stood prior to World War II, 500 meters from Germany's current border with Poland. Celebrants marched with the scroll into the town's Chabad-Lubavitch centre, where they danced with the Torah, which had been donated by members of the Chabad-Lubavitch community in Berlin.

== Demography ==
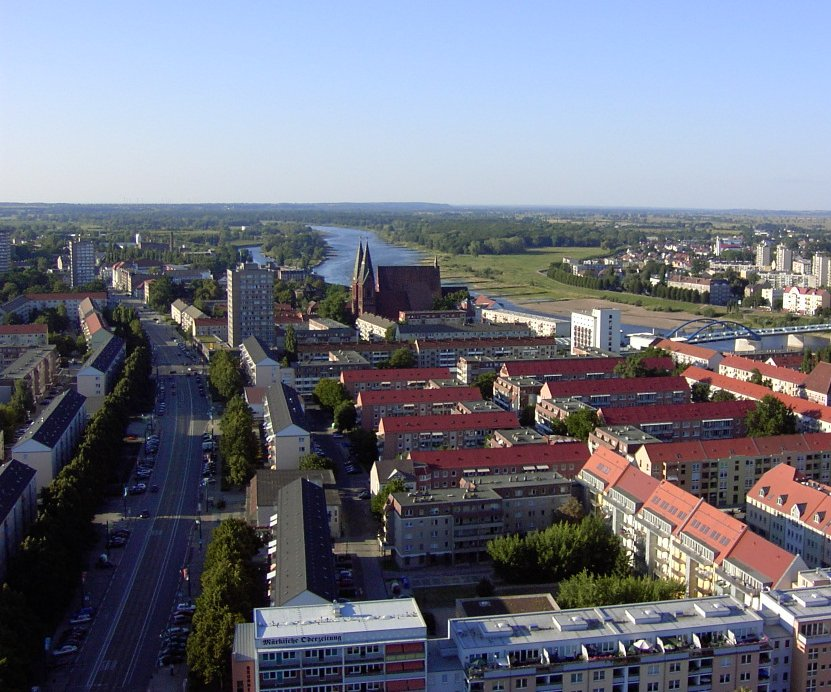
View from the Oderturm

Development of population since 1875 within the current boundaries (blue line: population; dotted line: comparison to population development of Brandenburg state)

Recent Population Development and Projections (Population Development before Census 2011 (blue line); Recent Population Development according to the Census in Germany in 2011 and 2022 (blue bordered line); Official projection for 2024-2040 in three variants (dotted lines 2025-2040)

Frankfurt (Oder): Population development
within the current boundaries (2025)

| Year | Pop. | ±% p.a. |
|---|---|---|
| 1875 | 43,491 | — |
| 1890 | 50,108 | +0.95% |
| 1910 | 59,905 | +0.90% |
| 1925 | 62,044 | +0.23% |
| 1933 | 65,717 | +0.72% |
| 1939 | 66,962 | +0.31% |
| 1946 | 54,153 | −2.99% |

| Year | Pop. | ±% p.a. |
|---|---|---|
| 1950 | 55,514 | +0.62% |
| 1964 | 60,163 | +0.58% |
| 1971 | 64,484 | +1.00% |
| 1981 | 81,009 | +2.31% |
| 1985 | 85,593 | +1.39% |
| 1990 | 86,171 | +0.13% |
| 1995 | 80,807 | −1.28% |

| Year | Pop. | ±% p.a. |
|---|---|---|
| 2000 | 72,131 | −2.25% |
| 2005 | 63,748 | −2.44% |
| 2010 | 60,330 | −1.10% |
| 2015 | 58,092 | −0.75% |
| 2020 | 57,015 | −0.37% |
| 2025 | 56,586 | −0.15% |

== European university ==
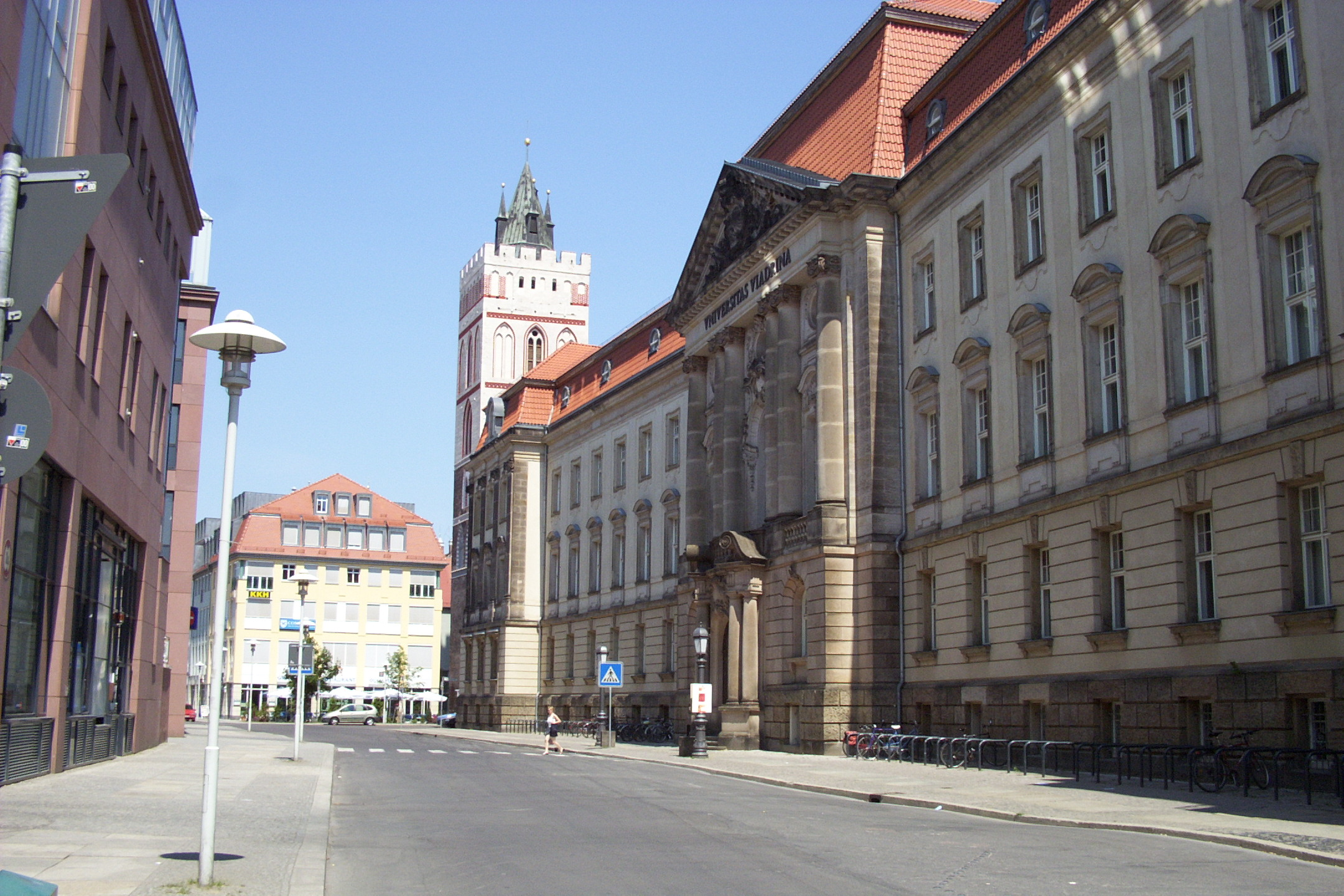
Viadrina European University, with the tower of the Marienkirche

The Margraviate of Brandenburg's first university was Frankfurt's Alma Mater Viadrina, founded in 1506 by Joachim I Nestor, Elector of Brandenburg. An early chancellor, Bishop Georg von Blumenthal (1490–1550), was a notable opponent of the Protestant Reformation, as he remained a Catholic. Frankfurt also trained the noted archbishop Albert of Brandenburg around 1510, who also became a vocal opponent of the Reformation. The university was closed in 1811, and its assets divided between two new universities founded under King Frederick William III: Frederick William University of Berlin, presently Humboldt University; and the Silesian Frederick William University in Breslau, presently the University of Wrocław.

The university was refounded in 1991 with a European emphasis as the Viadrina European University, in close cooperation with the Adam Mickiewicz University in Poznań; they jointly run the Collegium Polonicum in Słubice.

== Transport ==
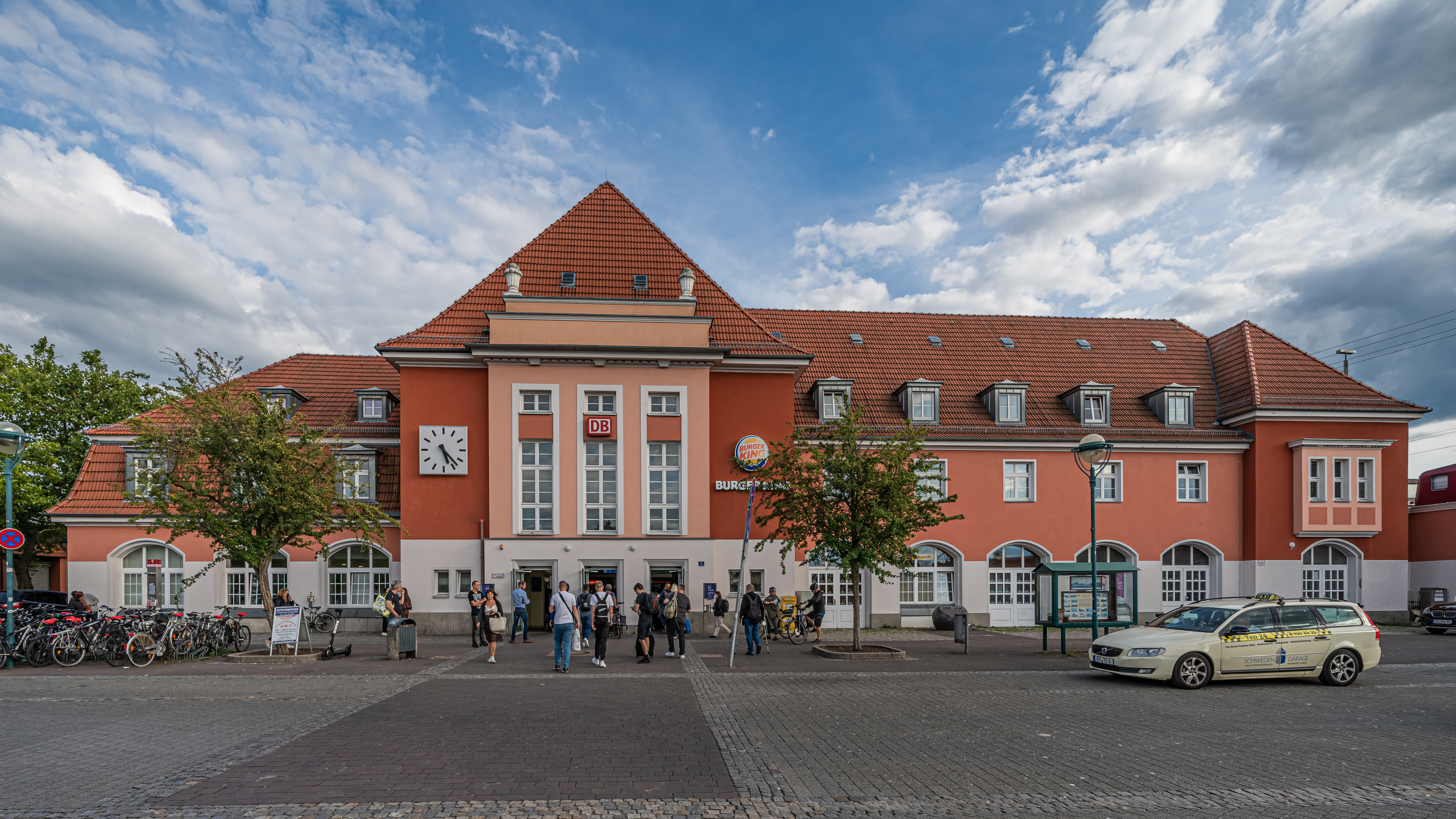
Main railway station

The Frankfurt (Oder) Bahnhof is a station served by the Berlin-Warszawa-Express and has regular regional connections to Eberswalde, Guben, Leipzig, Magdeburg and Cottbus. Within the city, there is a network of five tram lines (including bus services). The nearest airport is Berlin Brandenburg Airport which is located 80 km (50 mi) away.

== Sport ==
1. FC Frankfurt is the town's local football team.

The handball club Frankfurter HC has won the German Championship once, as well as several East German Championships.

== International relations ==
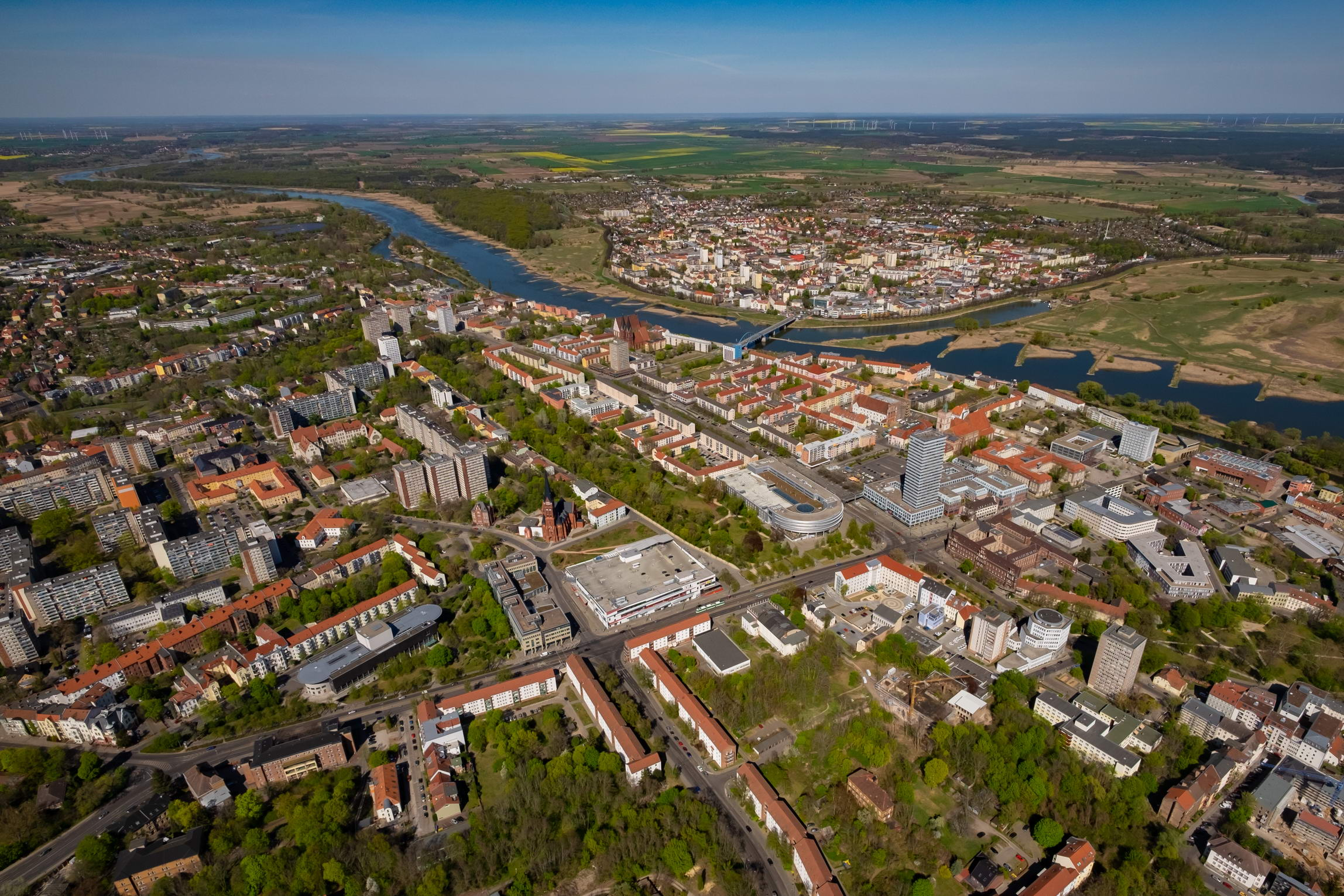
Aerial view of Frankfurt with Słubice across the Oder River

Frankfurt (Oder), being located on the border to Poland, plays a special role in connection with German–Polish relations and European integration. The European University Viadrina has one of its buildings in Poland, in the neighbouring town of Słubice. The university also has a number of projects and initiatives dedicated to bringing Poland and Germany together, and offers its students pro bono Polish courses.

Another project that contributes to German–Polish integration in Frankfurt (Oder) is the Fforst House, a German-Polish student project, which has been granted support by the town's administration and by the Viadrina, having been described by the former president of the university, Gesine Schwan, as the place where "Europe begins".

== Governance ==
Logo of the city, used together with Słubice

=== Mayor and city council ===
The current mayor is René Wilke (independent, formerly Left) since 2018. The most recent mayoral election was held on 28 February 2018 and the results were as follows:

| Candidate | Party | First round | | Second round | |
| Candidate | Party | Votes | % | Votes | % |
|---|---|---|---|---|---|
| René Wilke | The Left (Greens/FBI) | 9,505 | 43.4 | 11,337 | 62.5 |
| Martin Wilke | Independent | 4,433 | 20.3 | 6,804 | 37.5 |
| Wilko Möller | Alternative for Germany | 3,726 | 17.0 | | |
| Markus Derling | Christian Democratic Union | 3,116 | 14.2 | | |
| Jens-Marcel Ullrich | Social Democratic Party | 1,099 | 5.0 | | |
| Valid votes | | 21,879 | 99.1 | 18,141 | 99.0 |
| Invalid votes | | 205 | 0.9 | 176 | 1.0 |
| Total | | 22,084 | 100.0 | 18,317 | 100.0 |
| Electorate/voter turnout | | 48,562 | 45.5 | 48,572 | 37.7 |
Source: City of Frankfurt (Oder) 1st round, 2nd round

The city council governs the city alongside the mayor. The most recent city council election was held on 9 June 2024, and the results were as follows:

| Party | Votes | % | +/- | Seats | +/- |
|---|---|---|---|---|---|
| Alternative for Germany (AfD) | 22,600 | 28.7 | ▲9.9 | 13 | ▲4 |
| Christian Democratic Union (CDU) | 18,030 | 22.9 | ▲3.0 | 11 | ▲2 |
| The Left (Die Linke) | 12,449 | 15.8 | ▼7.0 | 7 | ▼3 |
| Social Democratic Party (SPD) | 9,990 | 12.7 | ▲2.4 | 5 | ▼1 |
| Alliance 90/The Greens/Development Initiative (Grüne/BI) | 4,802 | 6.1 | ▼5.9 | 3 | ▼3 |
| Frankfurt Citizens' Initiative/Free Voters (FBI–BVB/FW) | 4,135 | 5.2 | ▲1.2 | 2 | 0 |
| Die PARTEI | 3,871 | 4.9 | ▲1.3 | 2 | 0 |
| Free Democratic Party (FDP) | 2,971 | 3.8 | ▼1.3 | 2 | 0 |
| Valid votes | 78,848 | 100.0 | | 46 | ±0 |
| Invalid ballots | 547 | 2.0 | | | |
| Total ballots | 27,238 | 100.0 | | | |
| Electorate/voter turnout | 46,792 | 58.2 | ▲9.6 | | |
Source: City of Frankfurt (Oder)

== Twin towns – sister cities ==
Frankfurt (Oder) is twinned with:

- Gorzów Wielkopolski, Poland (1975)
- Heilbronn, Germany (1988)
- Kadima-Tzoran, Israel (1997)
- Nîmes, France (1976)
- Słubice, Poland (1975)
- Vantaa, Finland (1987)
- Vitebsk, Belarus (1991)
- Vratsa, Bulgaria (2009)
- Yuma, United States (1997)

== Notable people ==
=== Public service and commerce ===
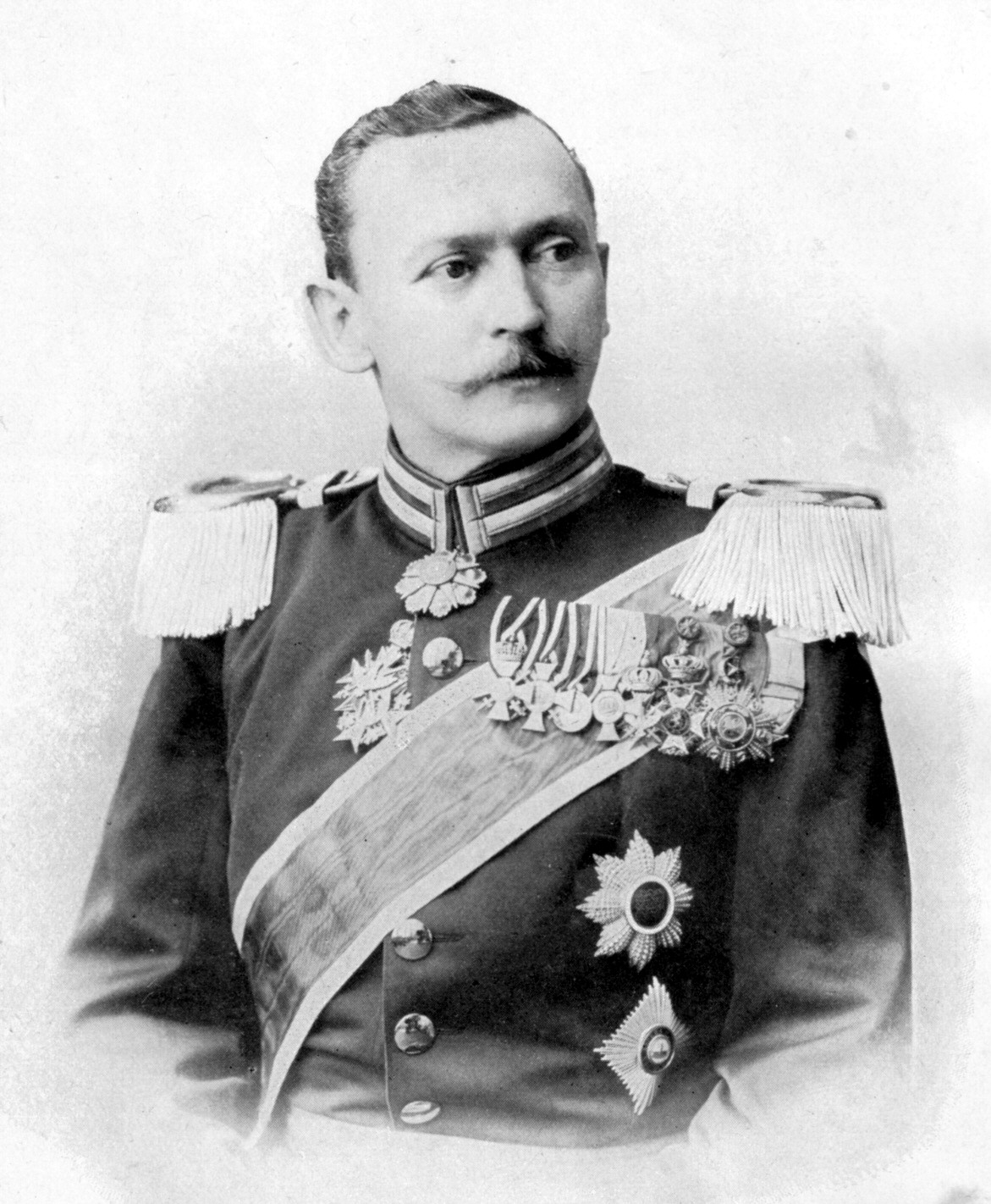
Hermann von Wissmann

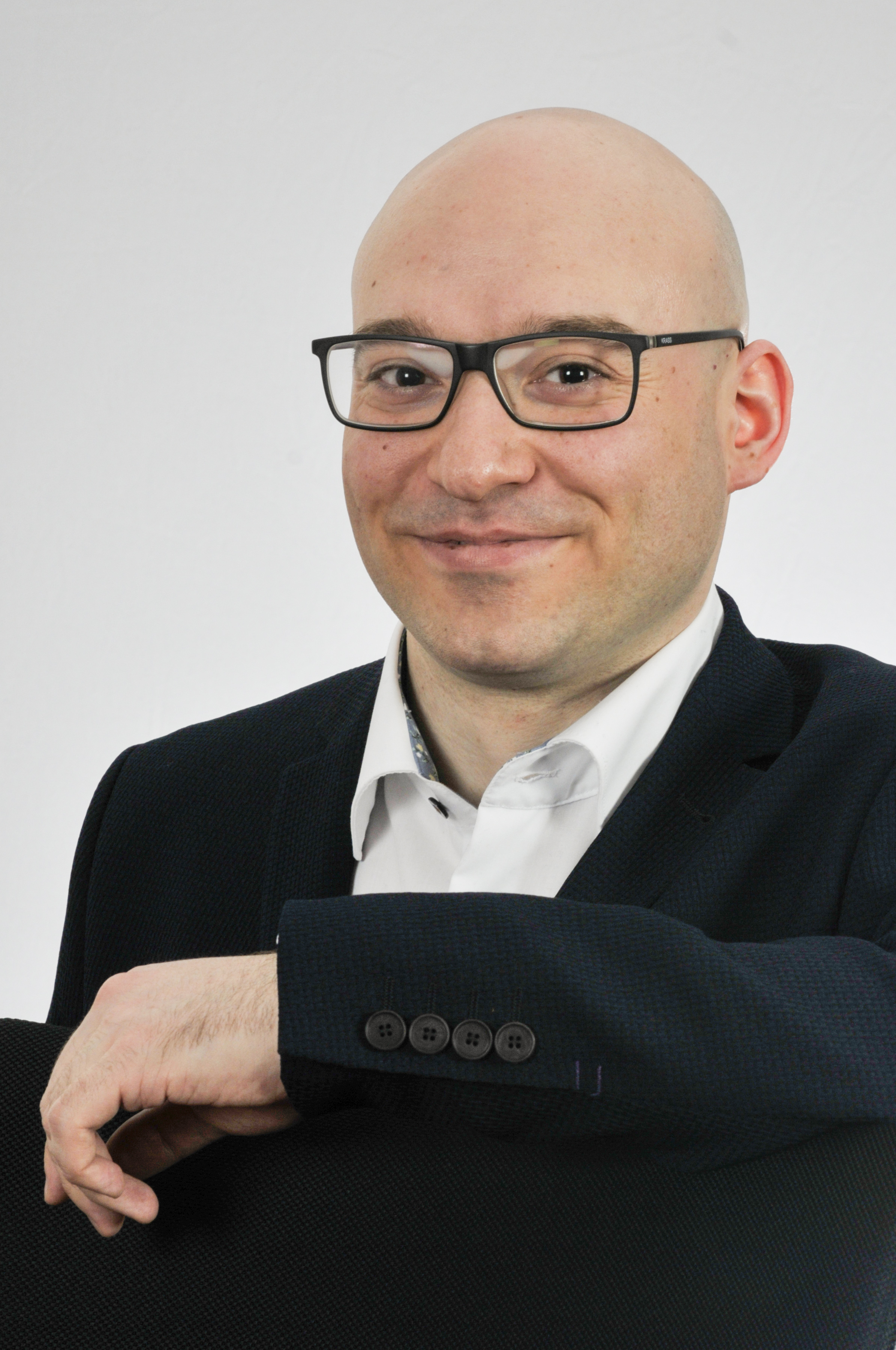
René Wilke, 2016

- Aaron ben Samuel (c. 1620–1701), rabbi
- Wilhelm Christian Benecke von Gröditzberg (1779–1860), German banker, merchant, estate owner and art collector
- Robert von Puttkamer (1828–1900), Prussian statesman, he also introduced reforms in German orthography.
- Wilhelm von Wedell-Piesdorf (1837|1915), Prussian politician
- Hermann Wissmann (1853–1905), German explorer and administrator in Africa
- Georg Michaelis (1857–1936), Chancellor of Germany for a few months in 1917, grew up in Frankfurt (Oder).
- Martin Salomonski (1881–1944), rabbi in Frankfurt from 1910 to 1925
- Lucie Hein (1910–1965), East German politician (SED), she served as the senior mayor of Frankfurt 1960 to 1965.
- Gerhard Neumann (1917–1997), German-American aviation engineer and executive for GE Aviation
- Zvi Aharoni (1921–2012), Israeli Mossad agent instrumental in the capture of Adolf Eichmann
- Dieter Sauberzweig (1925–2005), prominent commentator on German cultural politics (Kulturpolitiker)
- Karl-Heinz Schröter (born 1954), German politician (Social Democratic Party)
- Alexey Gordeyev (born 1955), Russian politician, served as the governor of Voronezh Oblast from 2009.
- Manuela Schwesig (born 1974), German politician (SPD), fifth Minister‐President of Mecklenburg-Vorpommern
- Franziska Giffey (born 1978), German politician, Federal Minister of Family Affairs, Senior Citizens, Women and Youth in the Fourth Merkel Cabinet
- Melanie Berger (born 1982), German politician (AfD)
- René Wilke (born 1984), German politician, mayor of Frankfurt (Oder)

=== The arts ===
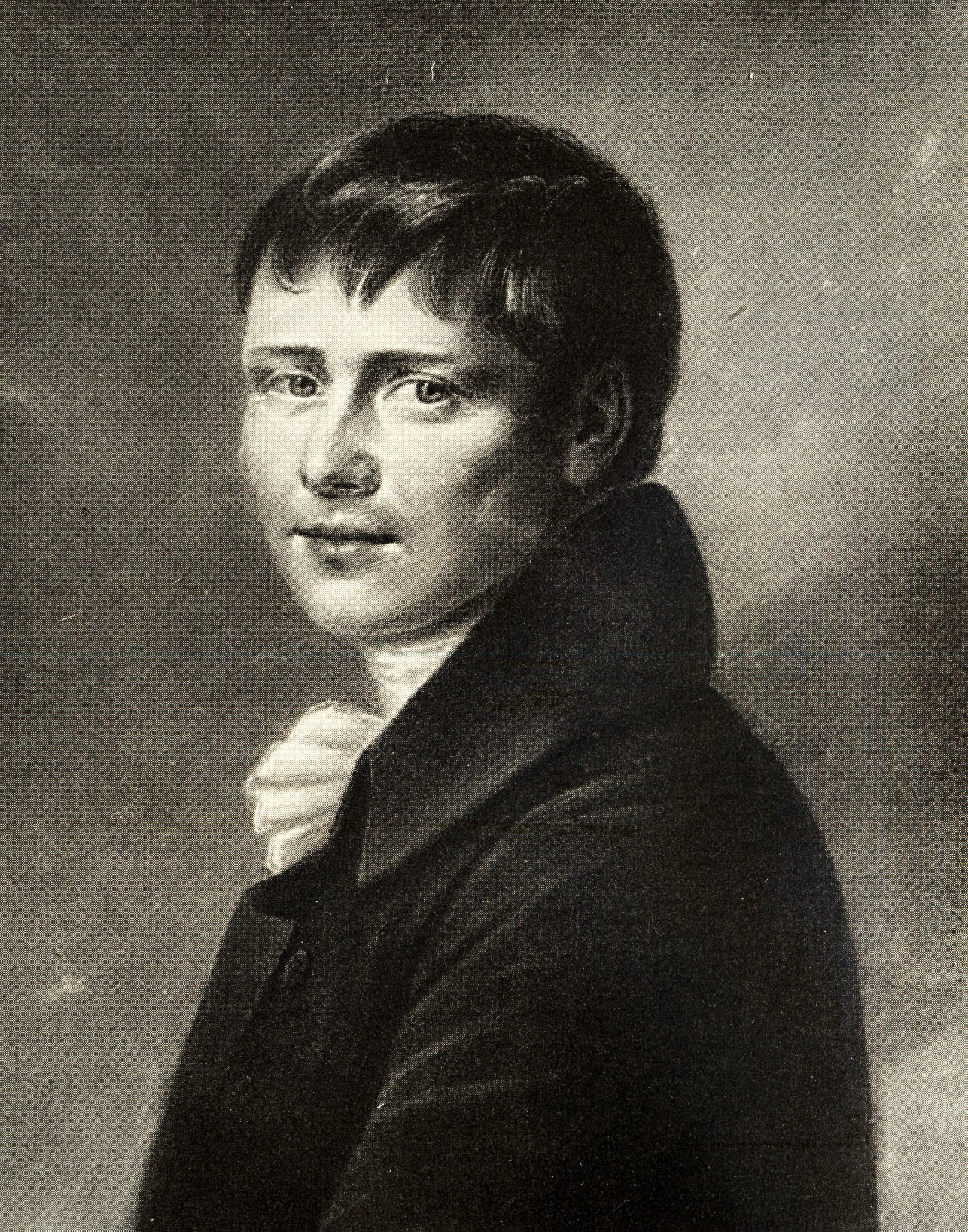
Heinrich von Kleist

- Bartholomäus Ringwaldt (1532 – c. 1599), a German didactic poet and Lutheran pastor
- Juste Chevillet (1729–1802), a French engraver, e.g. Histoire Naturelle of Georges-Louis Leclerc, Comte de Buffon
- Heinrich von Kleist (1777–1811), a German poet, dramatist, novelist, short story writer and journalist.
- Anton von Werner (1843–1915), a German painter of notable political and military events in the Kingdom of Prussia.
- Marie Goslich (1859–1936), a German journalist, photographer and magazine editor
- Herbert Bohme (1907–1971), a German poet who wrote poems and battle hymns for the Nazi Party
- Matthias Paul (born 1964), German actor
- René Pawlowitz (born 1975), a German electronic music producer and DJ
- Claudia Hiersche (born 1977), a German host and actress, known for her portrayal of a lesbian TV soap opera character
- Anne Pätzke (born 1982), a German illustrator and writer
- Finch (born 1990), a German rapper, battle rapper, YouTuber and Twitch streamer

=== Military ===
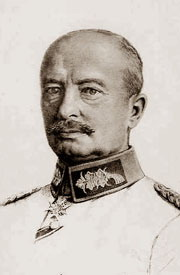
Konstantin Schmidt von Knobelsdorf

- Konstantin Schmidt von Knobelsdorf (1860–1936), a Prussian military officer and a general in WWI
- Vizeadmiral Hubert von Rebeur-Paschwitz (1863–1933), a German admiral, German Naval attaché to Washington
- Franz von Rintelen (1878–1949), a German Naval Intelligence officer in the United States during WWI.
- Erich Hoepner (1886–1944), a German officer, served in both World Wars, executed for his role in the 20 July Plot
- Fritz-Hubert Gräser (1888–1960), a German general in the Wehrmacht
- Dietrich von Jagow (1892-1945), a German officer in the Wehrmacht and politician
- Theodor Busse (1897–1986), a German Army officer during WWI and WWII
- Karl-Jesko von Puttkamer (1900–1981), a German admiral, naval adjutant to Adolf Hitler during WWII
- Rudolf Brandt (1909–1948), German Nazi SS officer, executed for war crimes
- Paul-Heinrich Dähne (1921–1945), a German Luftwaffe flying ace
- Günter Kießling (1925–2009), a German general in the Bundeswehr

=== Science ===
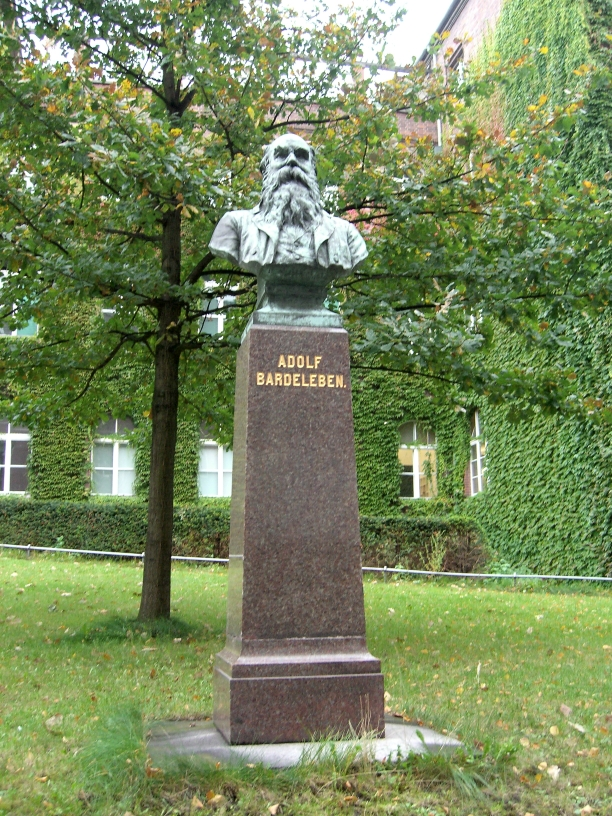
A monument in Berlin to Adolf Bardeleben

- Erdmann Copernicus (died 1573 while head of the university), German scholar, not related to the astronomer
- Johann Sigismund Elsholtz (1623–1688), a German naturalist, pioneer in hygiene, nutrition and holistic health
- Bernhard Siegfried Albinus (1697–1770), a German-born Dutch anatomist.
- Karl August von Bergen (1704–1759), a German anatomist and botanist, he showed the distribution of cellular membranes in animals.
- Heinrich Adolf von Bardeleben (1819–1895), a German surgeon, used Joseph Lister's methodology for antiseptic treatment of wounds.
- Hermann Rudolph Aubert (1826–1892), a German physiologist, he researched psychophysics and experimented dark adaptation
- Georg Hermann Quincke (1834–1924), a German physicist, modified the dissociation hypothesis of Clausius.
- Reinhold Wilhelm Buchholz (1837–1876), a German zoologist who worked in herpetology, carcinology and ichthyology
- Heinrich Quincke (1842–1922), a German internist and surgeon, introduced the lumbar puncture.
- Friedrich Loeffler (1852–1915), a German bacteriologist at the University of Greifswald
- Heinrich Seilkopf (1895–1968), a German meteorologist, in 1939 coined the term jet stream for the weather phenomena originally discovered by Wasaburo Oishi.
- Käthe Mende (1878–1963), a German sociologist.

=== Sport ===
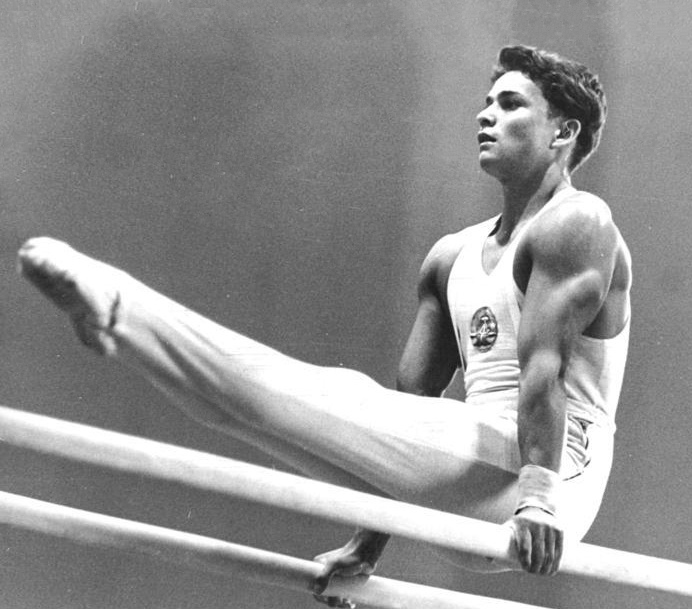
Klaus Köste, 1963

- Hermann Weingärtner (1864–1919), a German gymnast, competed at the 1896 Summer Olympics in Athens
- Klaus Köste (1943–2012), a German gymnast, gold medalist in the vault at the 1972 Summer Olympics in Munich
- Maik Bullmann (born 1967), a German Greco-Roman wrestler, competed at the 1992 and 1996 Summer Olympics
- Sebastian Köber (born 1979), a German boxer, the Heavyweight bronze medalist at the 2000 Summer Olympics
- Markus Thätner (born 1985), an amateur German Greco-Roman wrestler, competed at the 2008 Summer Olympics in Beijing
- Florian Schmidt (born 1986), a German sport shooter, competed in the 2008 and the 2012 Summer Olympics

== Films set in Frankfurt ==
In recent years, Frankfurt has been the setting for several notable German films:

- Halbe Treppe (Grill Point, 2002)
- Lichter (Distant Lights, 2003)
- Die Kinder sind tot (The Children Are Dead, a documentary about a 1999 murder-by-neglect in Frankfurt, 2004)
- No Exit (2004, documentary about Neo-Nazis)
- Kombat Sechzehn (Combat Sixteen, 2005)

== Climate ==
Climate data for Manschnow (Note: Manschnow is located approximately 24 kilometres (14.9 mi) north of Frankfurt (Oder).) (1991–2020 normals)
| Month | Jan | Feb | Mar | Apr | May | Jun | Jul | Aug | Sep | Oct | Nov | Dec | Year |
|---|---|---|---|---|---|---|---|---|---|---|---|---|---|
| Mean daily maximum °C (°F) | 2.9 (37.2) | 4.7 (40.5) | 8.9 (48.0) | 15.3 (59.5) | 19.7 (67.5) | 23.0 (73.4) | 25.3 (77.5) | 25.1 (77.2) | 20.1 (68.2) | 14.2 (57.6) | 7.6 (45.7) | 3.9 (39.0) | 14.2 (57.6) |
| Daily mean °C (°F) | 0.4 (32.7) | 1.5 (34.7) | 4.4 (39.9) | 9.5 (49.1) | 14.0 (57.2) | 17.3 (63.1) | 19.5 (67.1) | 19.0 (66.2) | 14.6 (58.3) | 9.7 (49.5) | 4.7 (40.5) | 1.6 (34.9) | 9.7 (49.4) |
| Mean daily minimum °C (°F) | −2.3 (27.9) | −1.8 (28.8) | 0.2 (32.4) | 3.5 (38.3) | 7.7 (45.9) | 11.1 (52.0) | 13.4 (56.1) | 13.0 (55.4) | 9.4 (48.9) | 5.6 (42.1) | 1.8 (35.2) | −0.9 (30.4) | 5.1 (41.1) |
| Average precipitation mm (inches) | 33.1 (1.30) | 25.3 (1.00) | 29.1 (1.15) | 26.6 (1.05) | 49.2 (1.94) | 49.3 (1.94) | 74.2 (2.92) | 59.0 (2.32) | 42.9 (1.69) | 34.8 (1.37) | 32.2 (1.27) | 29.6 (1.17) | 485.3 (19.12) |
| Average precipitation days (≥ 1.0 mm) | 15.5 | 13.5 | 13.6 | 10.4 | 12.6 | 12.9 | 14.2 | 12.3 | 11.0 | 13.0 | 13.4 | 15.2 | 157.6 |
| Average snowy days (≥ 1.0 cm) | 7.6 | 6.4 | 2.5 | 0.2 | 0 | 0 | 0 | 0 | 0 | 0.1 | 1.0 | 4.6 | 22.4 |
| Average relative humidity (%) | 86.3 | 82.6 | 77.6 | 69.2 | 69.5 | 69.8 | 69.9 | 70.0 | 76.2 | 82.9 | 88.5 | 87.9 | 77.5 |
| Mean monthly sunshine hours | 53.4 | 77.5 | 128.6 | 204.0 | 233.4 | 235.2 | 235.2 | 227.1 | 163.8 | 110.4 | 57.0 | 43.7 | 1,769.3 |
Source: NOAA

== Gallery ==
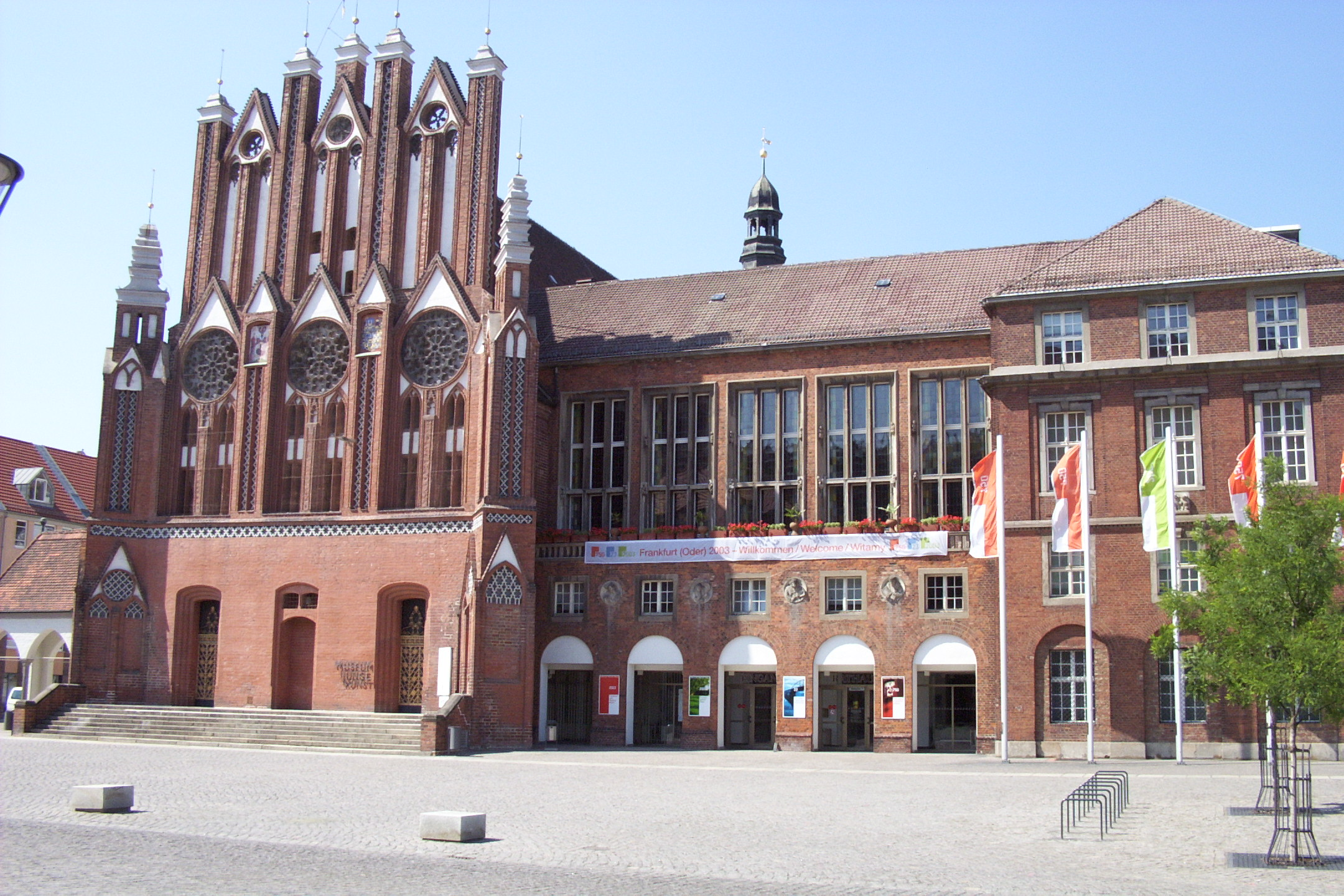
The Gothic town hall

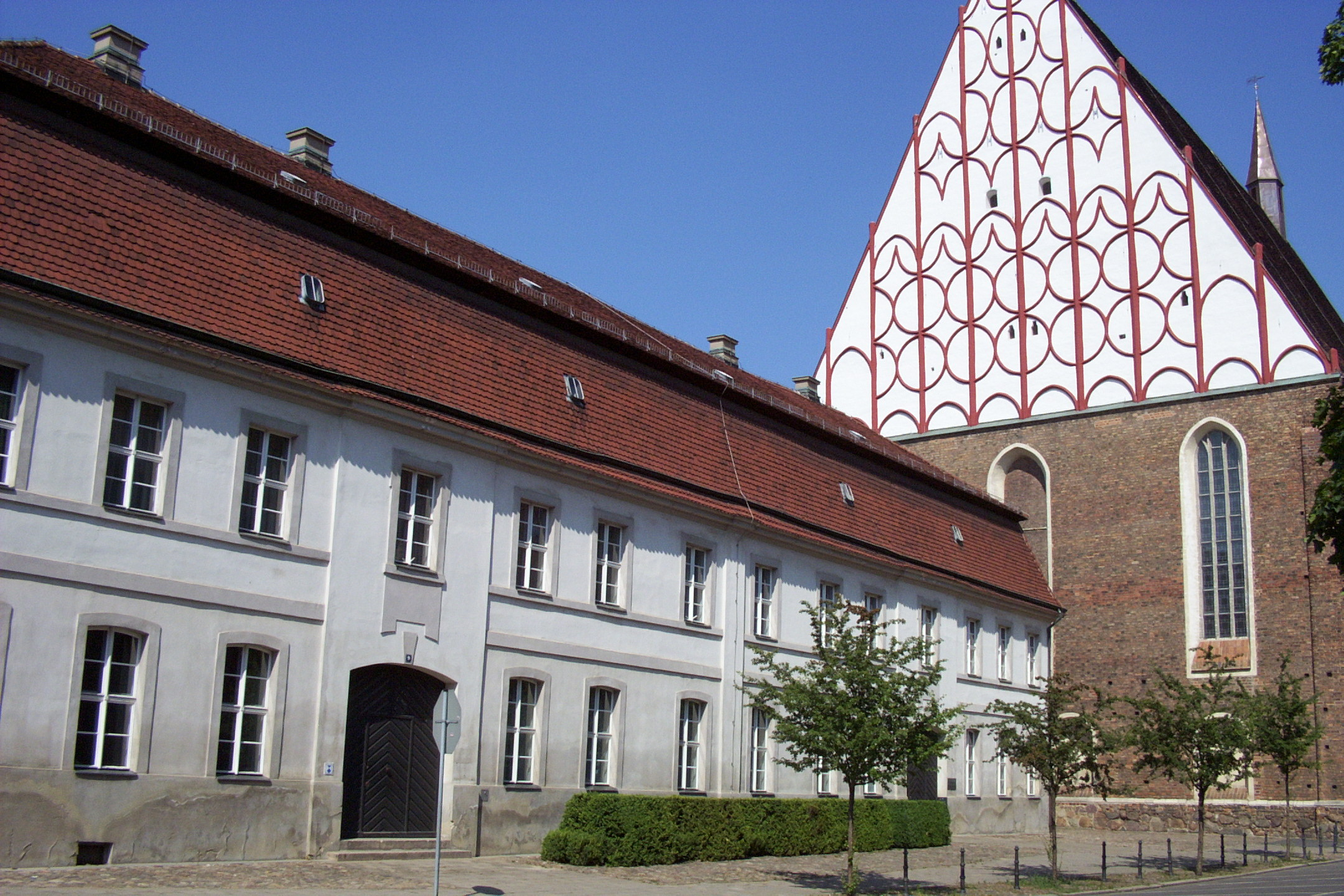
The town archives and the C.P.E. Bach Concert Hall

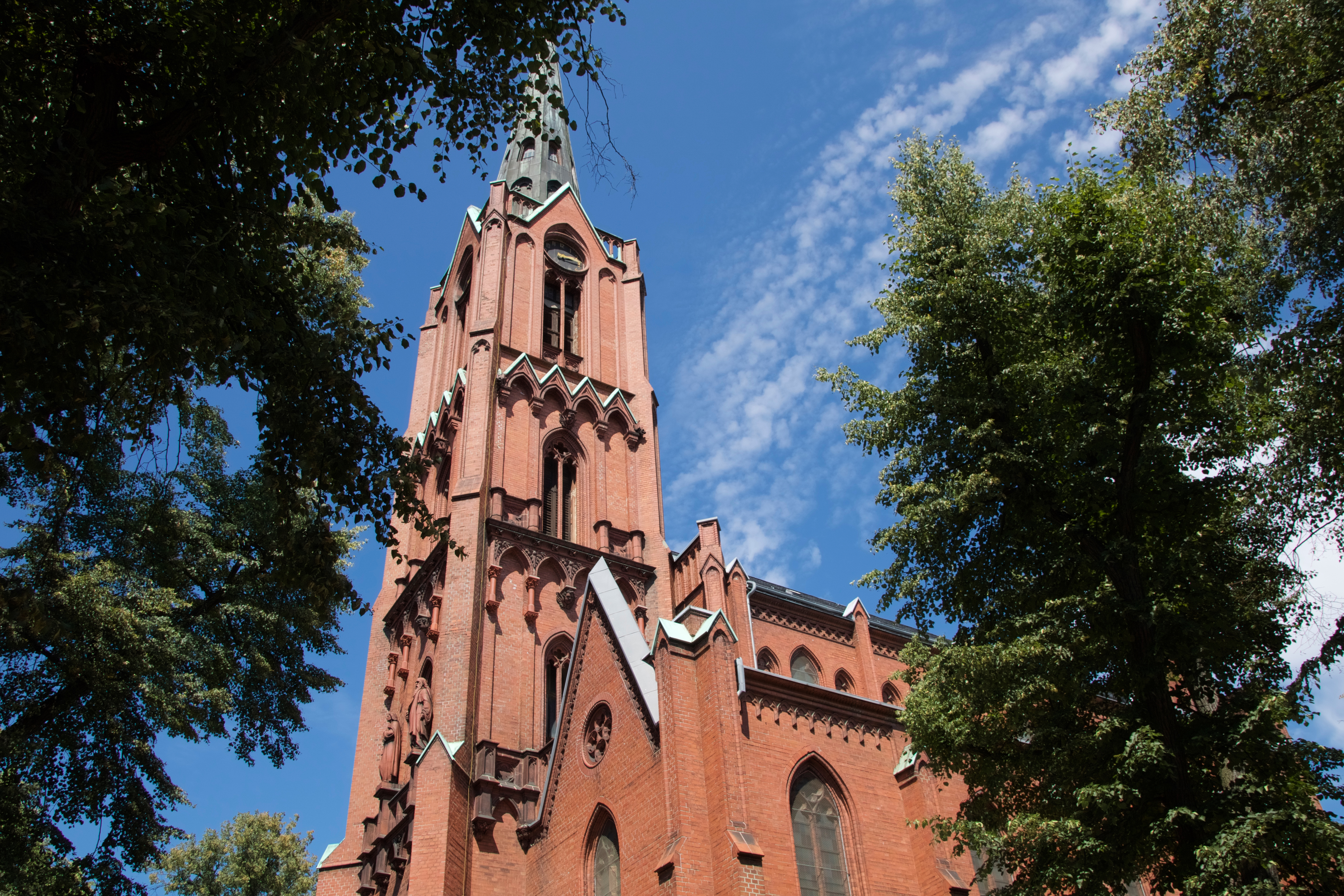
St. Gertraud's Church

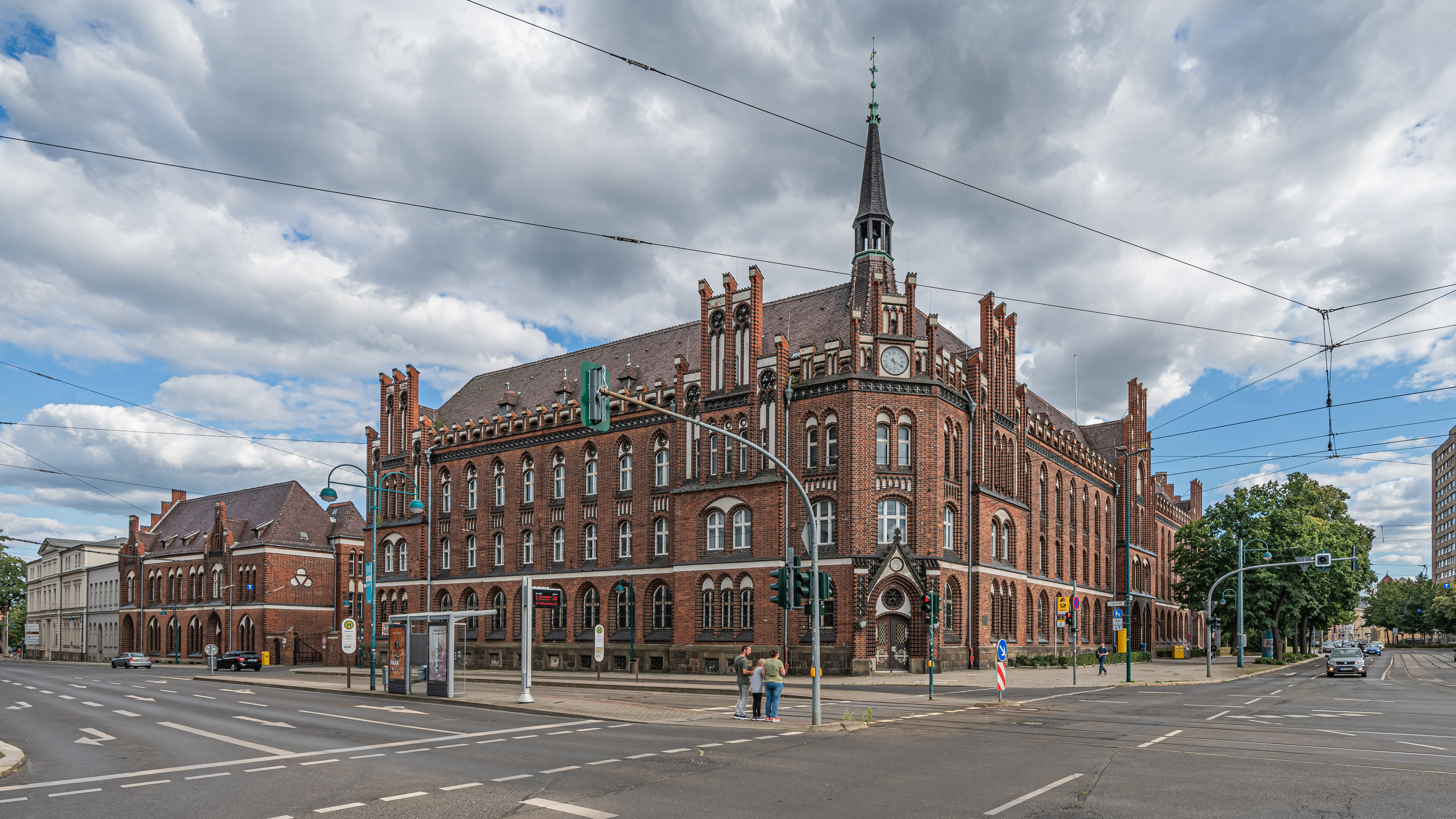
Neo-Gothic post office

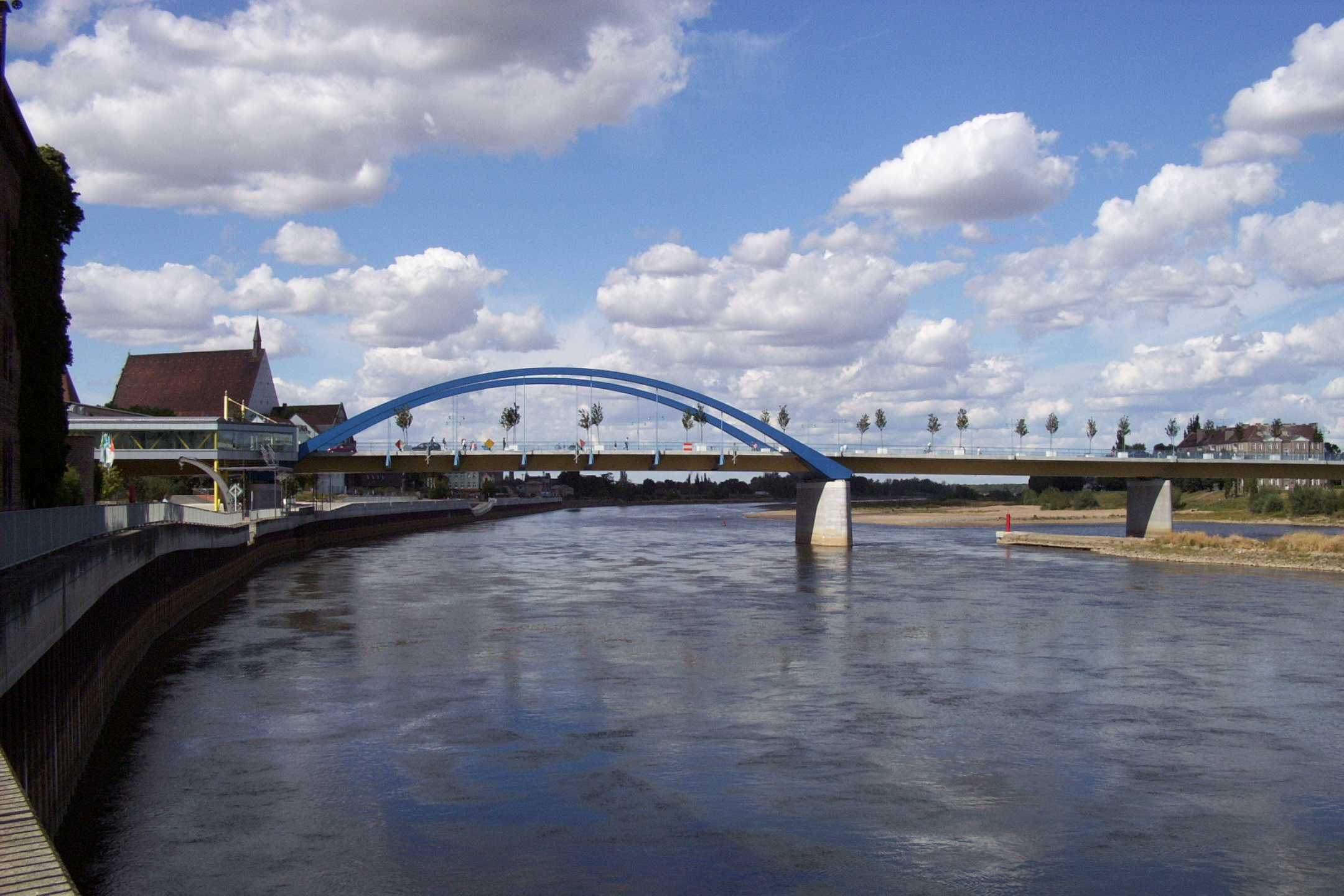
The Oder bridge linking Frankfurt with Słubice

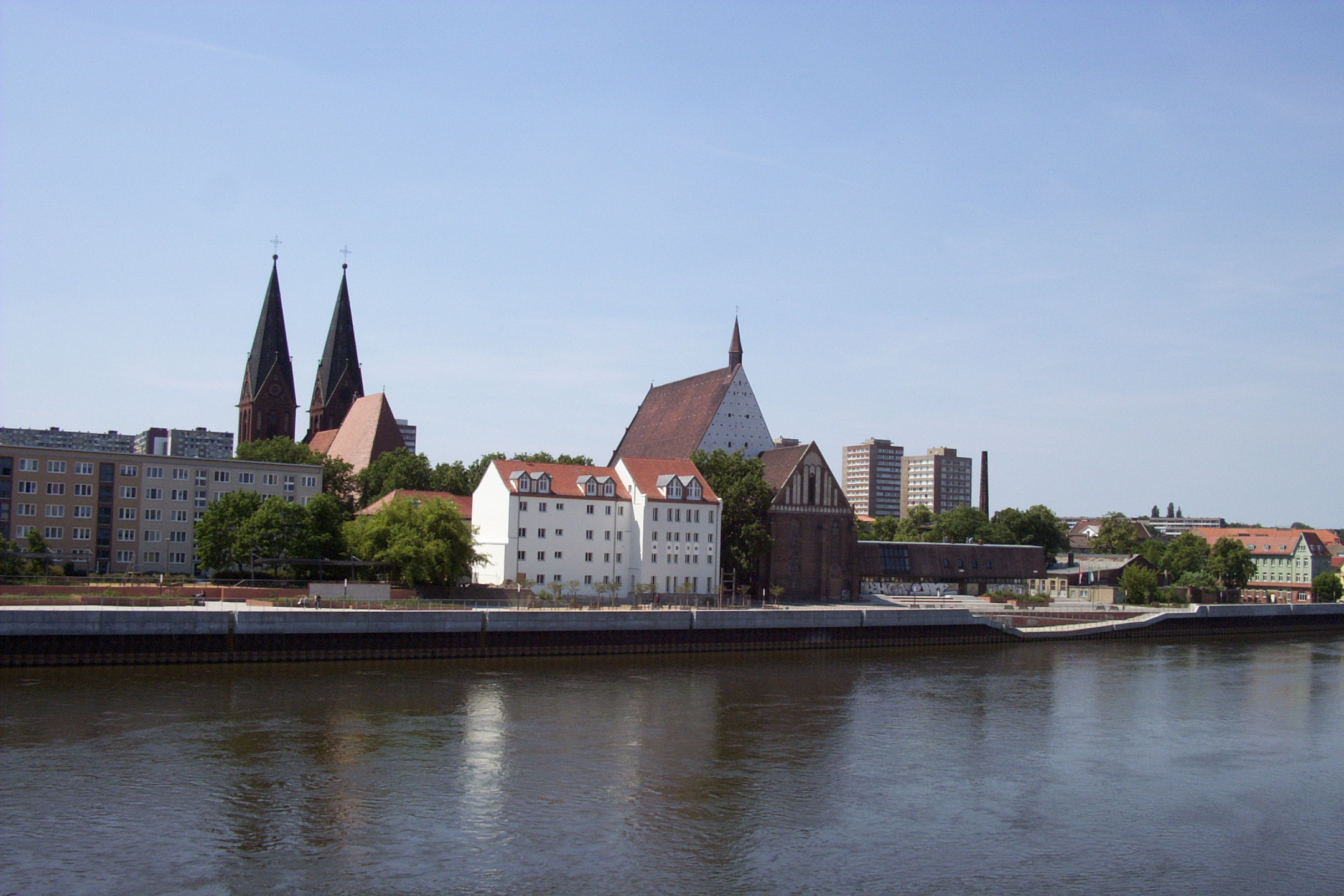
View of northern Frankfurt river front

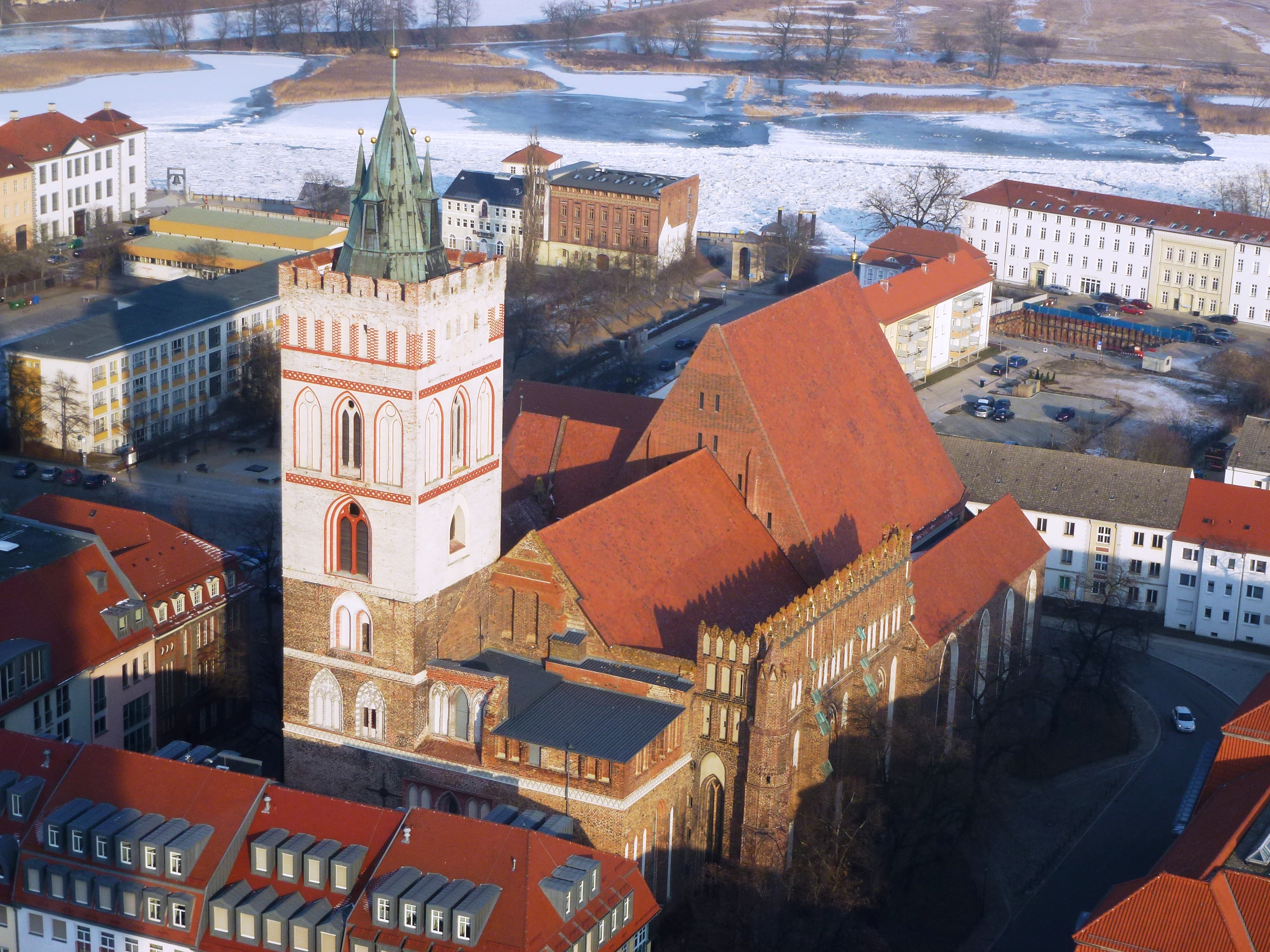
Brick Gothic St. Mary's Church

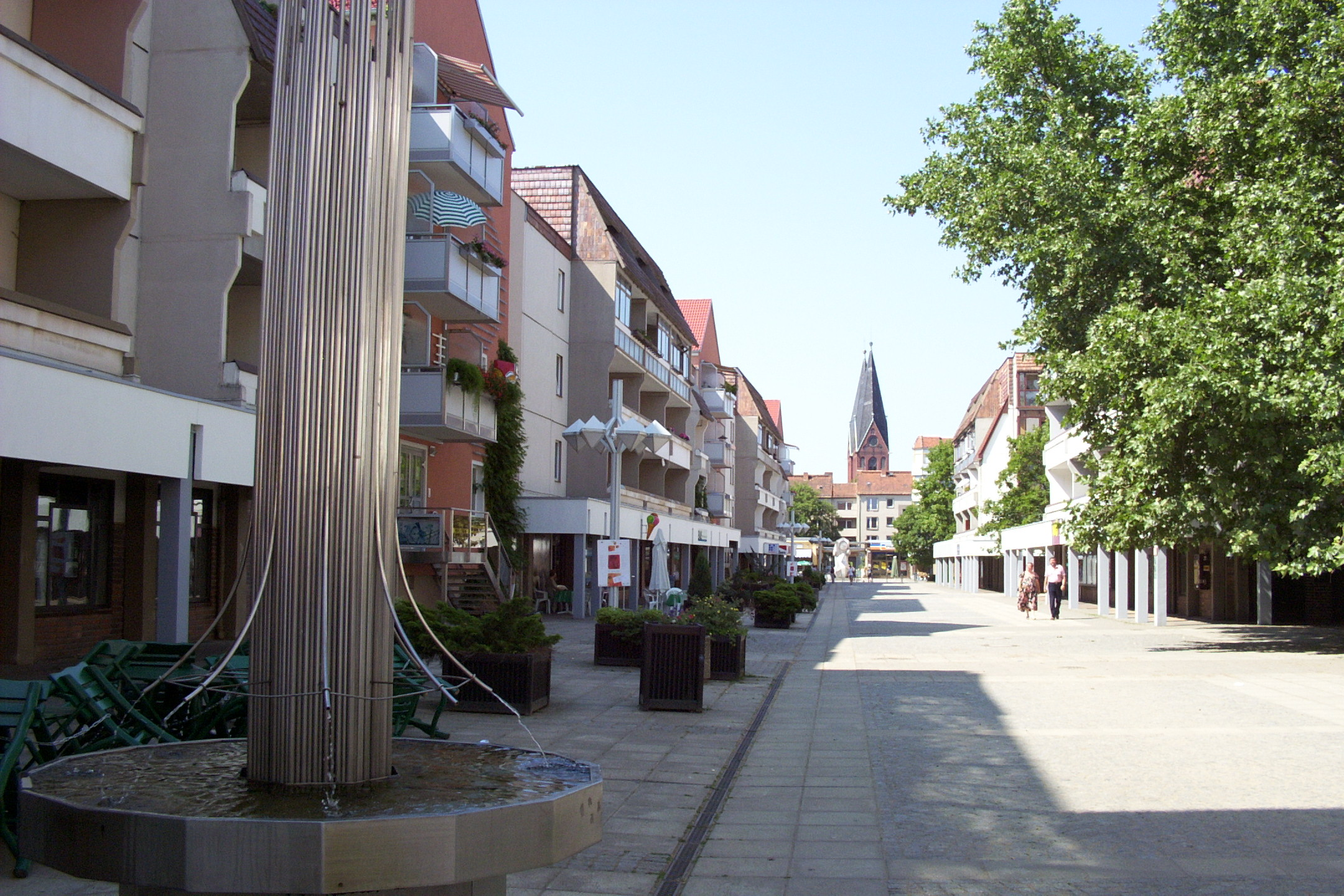
Große Scharrnstraße, rebuilt in the late 1980s

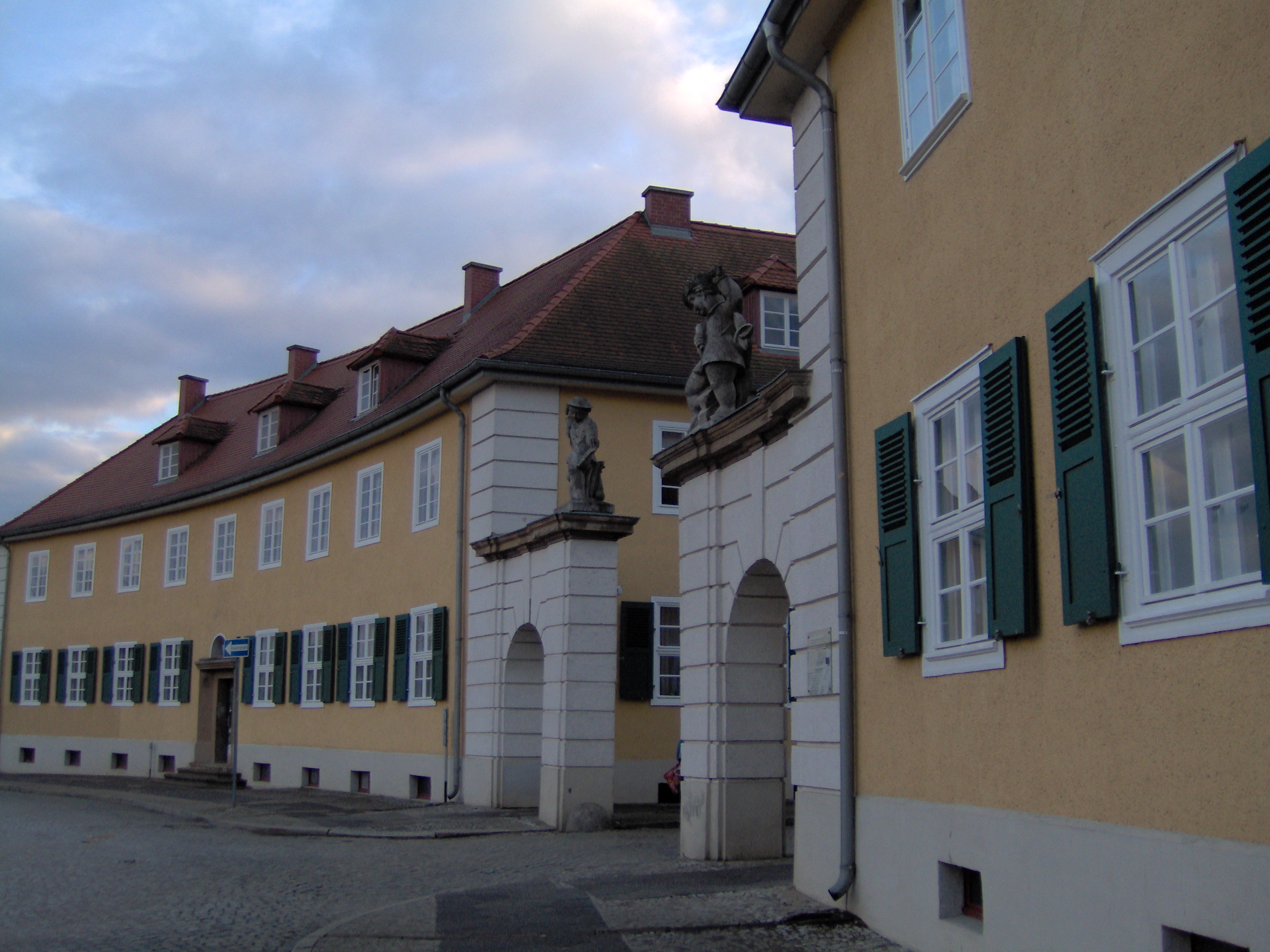
The Paulinenhof settlement, built in the 1920s for railway employees

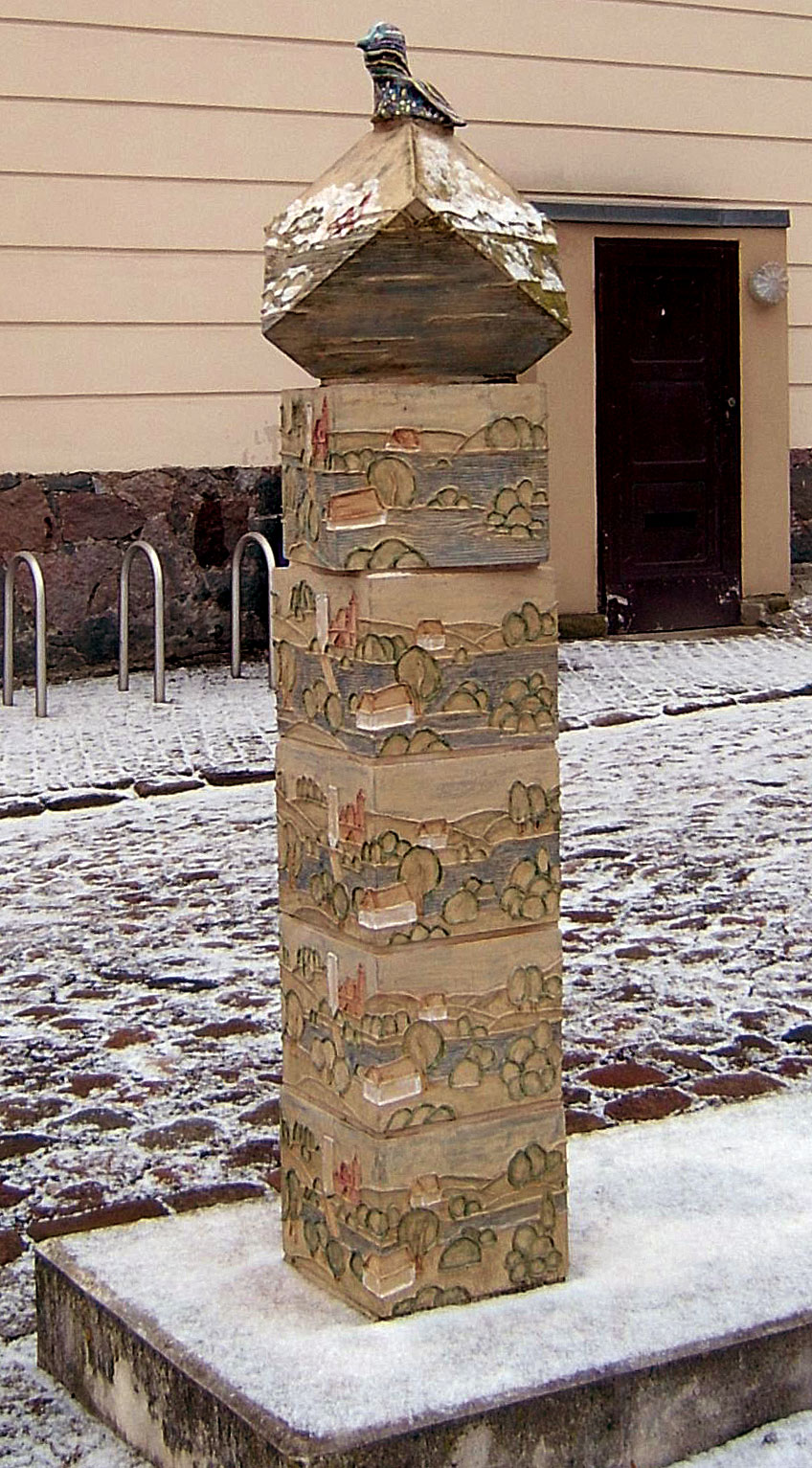
The Flutstein, Oderpromenade

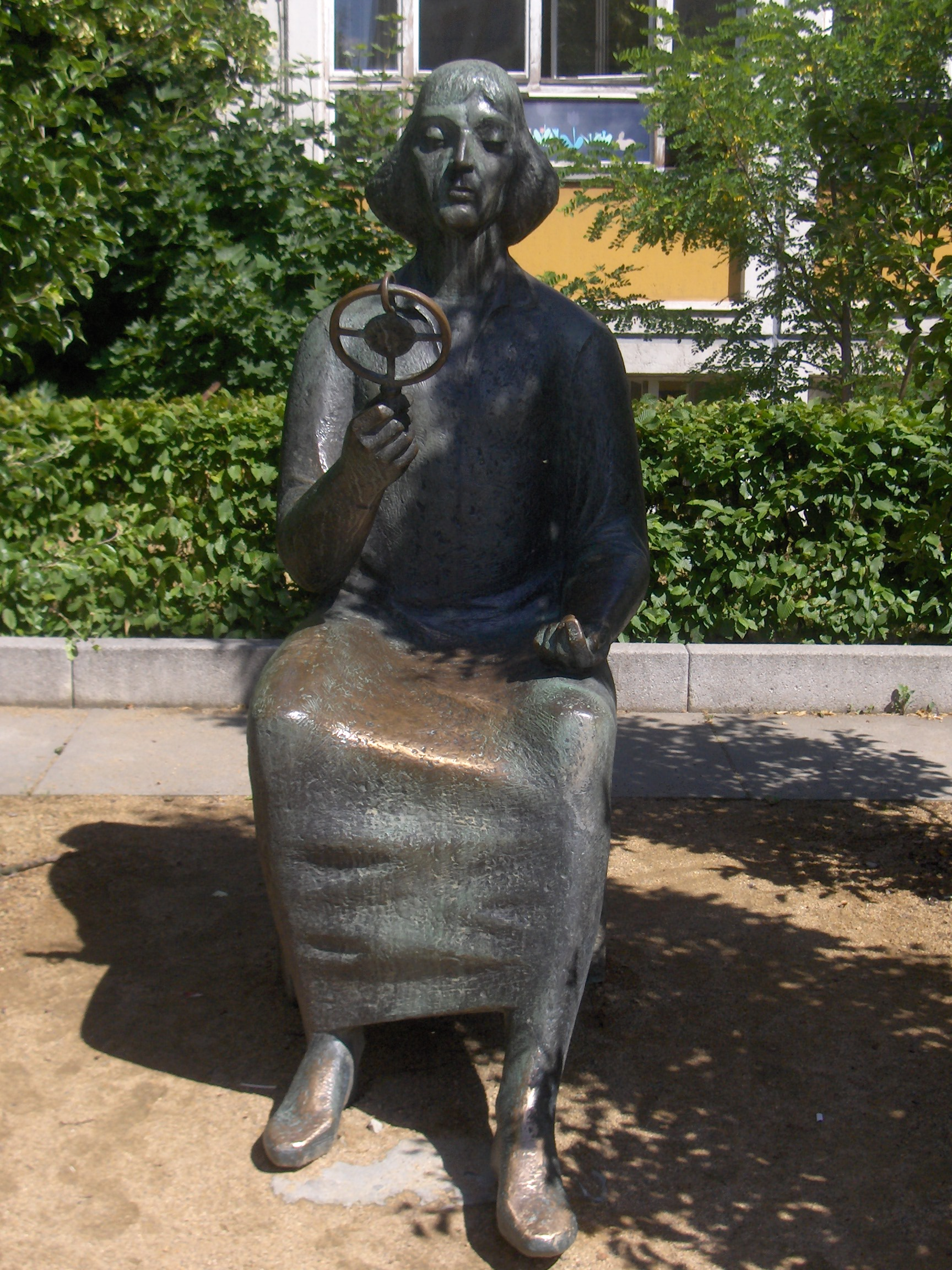
Nicolaus Copernicus monument

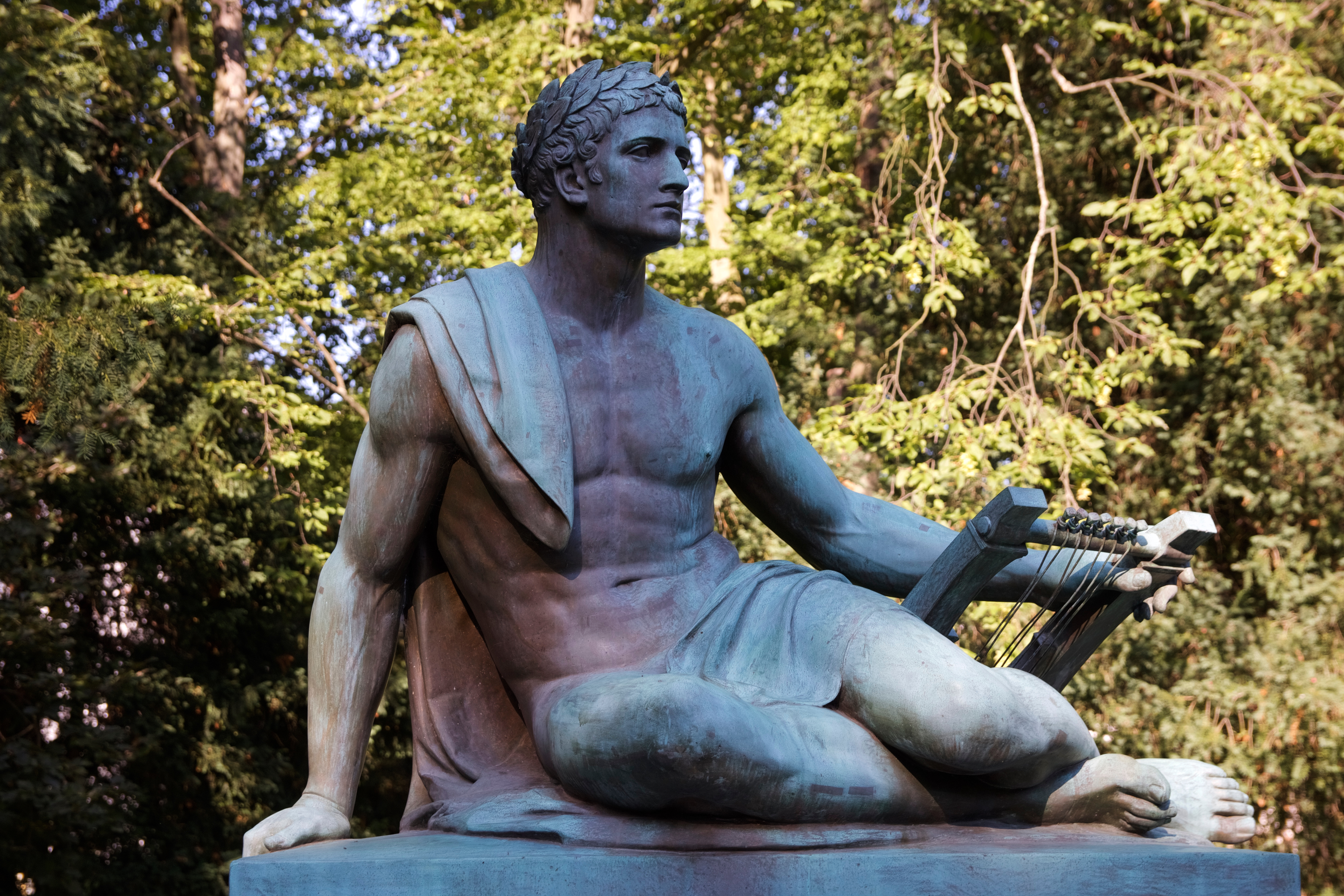
Kleist Memorial

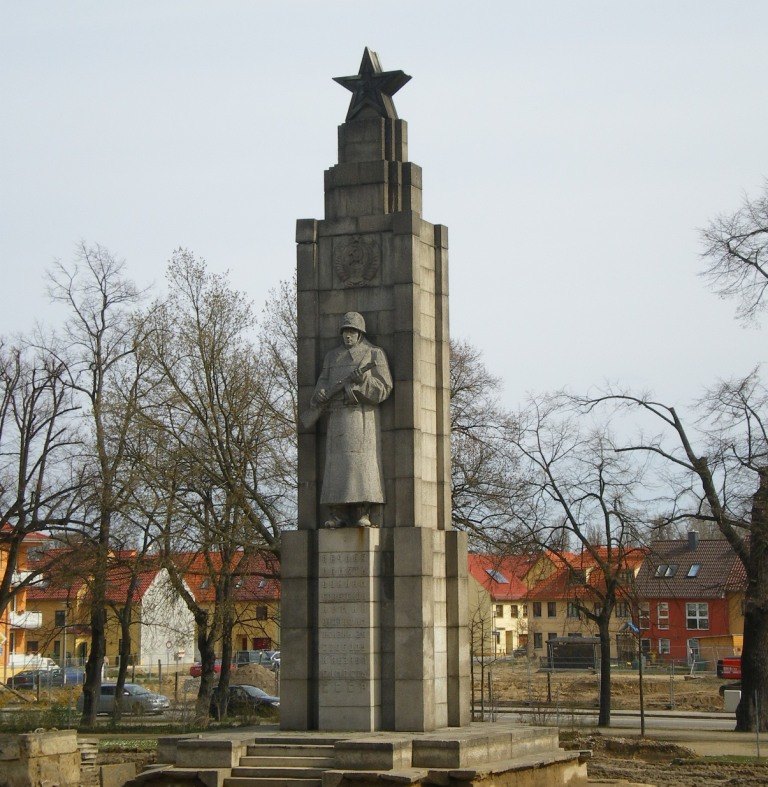
Red Army monument

== See also ==
- Helenesee
- Hohenwalde
- Stadtarchiv Frankfurt (Oder)
- Trams in Frankfurt (Oder)
- Carl-Philipp-Emanuel-Bach-Straße

== Bibliography ==
- Bröckling, Ulrich; Sikora, Michael (1998). Armeen und ihre Deserteure: Vernachlässigte Kapital einer Militärgeschichte der Neuzeit (in German). Vandenhoeck & Ruprecht. ISBN 3-525-01365-5.
- Mackillop, Andrew; Murdoch, Steve (2003). Military governors and imperial frontiers c. 1600-1800: A study of Scotland and empires. BRILL. ISBN 90-04-12970-7.
