= Oegeln station =

Railway station in Germany

Oegeln

General information
- Location: Am Bahnhof Oegeln; 15848 Beeskow; Brandenburg; Germany
- Coordinates: 52.1727°N 14.2710°E
- Owner: DB Netz
- Operator: DB Station&Service
- Lines: Königs Wusterhausen–Grunow railway (KBS 209.36)
- Platforms: 1 side platform
- Tracks: 1
- Train operators: Niederbarnimer Eisenbahn

Other information
- Station code: 4729
- DS100 code: BOEG
- IBNR: 8012551
- Category: 7
- Fare zone: : 6270
- Website: www.bahnhof.de

Services
| Preceding station | Niederbarnimer Eisenbahn | Following station |
|---|---|---|
| Beeskow towards Königs Wusterhausen | RB 36 | Schneeberg (Mark) towards Frankfurt (Oder) |
Location
- Location within Brandenburg

Oegeln station is a railway station in the Oegeln district in the municipality of Beeskow, located in the Oder-Spree district in Brandenburg, Germany.
