= Schneeberg (Mark) station =

Railway station in Germany

Schneeberg (Mark)

General information
- Location: Bahnhofstraße 7; 15848 Schneeberg (Mark); Brandenburg; Germany
- Coordinates: 52.1646°N 14.3301°E
- Owner: DB Netz
- Operator: DB Station&Service
- Lines: Königs Wusterhausen–Grunow railway (KBS 209.36)
- Platforms: 1 side platform
- Tracks: 1
- Train operators: Niederbarnimer Eisenbahn

Other information
- Station code: 5626
- DS100 code: BSB
- IBNR: 8012895
- Category: 7
- Fare zone: : 6270
- Website: www.bahnhof.de

Services
Preceding station	Niederbarnimer Eisenbahn	Following station
Oegeln towards Königs Wusterhausen	RB 36	Grunow (Niederlausitz) towards Frankfurt (Oder)
Location
- Location within Brandenburg

Schneeberg (Mark) station is a railway station in the Schneeberg (Mark) district in the municipality of Beeskow, located in the Oder-Spree district in Brandenburg, Germany.
