= Sabine Wienker-Piepho =

German folklorist

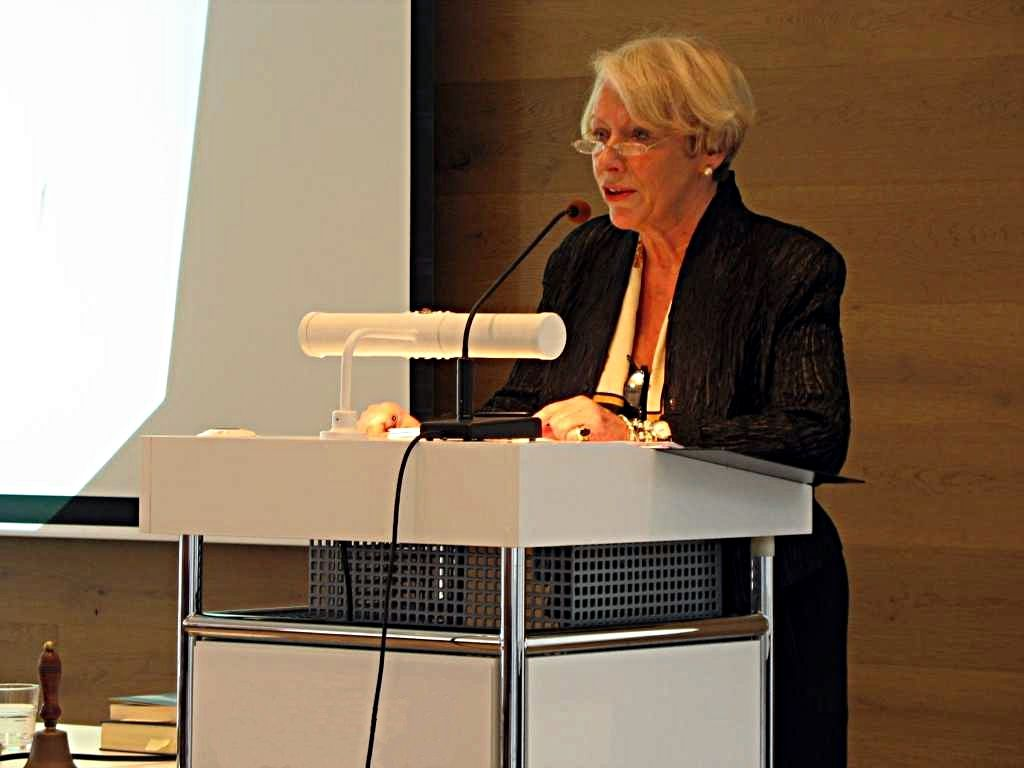
Sabine Wienker-Piepho

Sabine Auguste Marie Wienker-Piepho (9 October 1946 – 21 May 2025) was a German folklorist and literary scholar.

== Life and career ==
Wienker-Piepho was born in Göttingen, the daughter of zoologist Hans Piepho (1909–1993) and his wife Dorette, née Kirchhof. After attending school in Zurich and Göttingen and graduating from the Hermann-Lietz-Schule boarding school at Hohenwerda Castle in Hesse, she began her studies in 1966 at the Universities of Freiburg and Göttingen, initially focusing on German studies, history, and political science, and later on English and American studies. As part of an exchange program, she taught German language and grammar as well as modern German literary history for a year at the University of Pennsylvania in Philadelphia. In 1974, she completed her studies in German studies at the University of Freiburg with a thesis on nature and the experience of time: lyrical elements in the work of Peter Huchel.

Alongside her work at the German Folk Song Archive in Freiburg, Wienker-Piepho pursued a second degree in folklore studies, graduating with a Master of Arts in the summer of 1984. In December 1987, she received her doctorate from the University of Freiburg with a dissertation on women as folk heroes, supervised by Lutz Röhrich and Otto Holzapfel.

Afterwards, she held visiting professorships in European ethnology, folklore, and art history in Augsburg and Bayreuth, and was a visiting professor at the Universities of Jyväskylä, Minsk, and Tartu. Before moving to Jena in 2008 and then Münster in 2009, she temporarily headed the Institute for German and Comparative Folklore at LMU Munich, and then the Institute in Jena until 2014. From 2015, she also held teaching positions in Freiburg, Bamberg, and Zurich, and continued to teach in Jena until 2020. Her research focused on folkloric narratology (fairy tales, legends, songs, anecdotes, proverbs, and jokes), concepts of time, and the concept of homo ludens.
