= Duchy of Silesia =

Medieval duchy in Poland

Duchy of Silesia Księstwo śląskie (Polish) Ślōnski firsztyntōm (Silesian) Herzogtum Schlesien (German) Slezské knížectví (Czech)
- 1138–1335
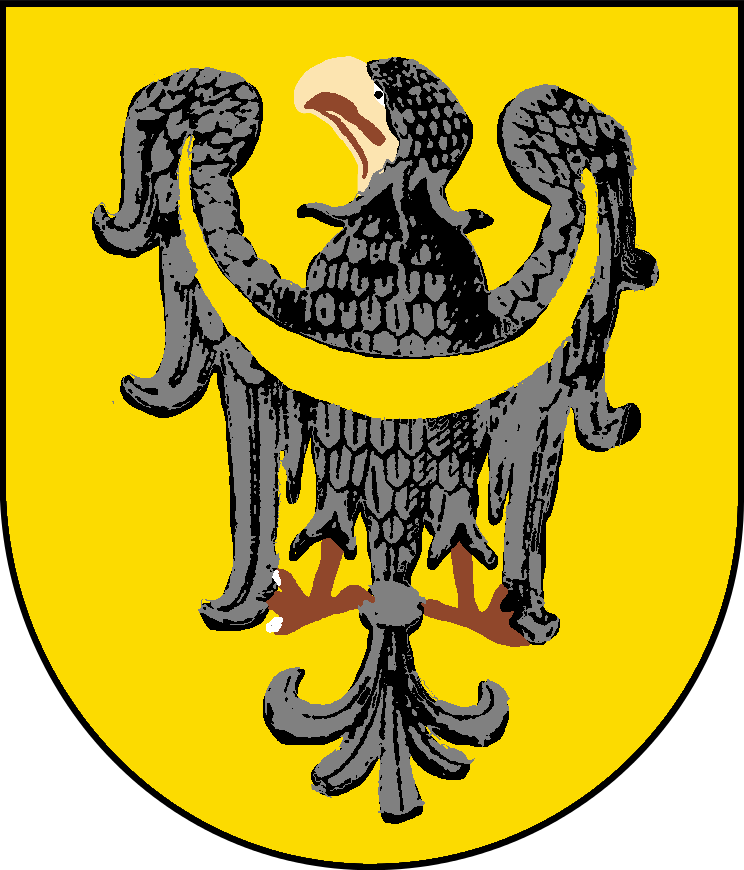
- Banner of arms Coat of arms

- Territorial development of the Duchy of Silesia in the period 1185–1201: Fragmentation begins with Opole (green) and Racibórz (yellow) splitting off
- Status: Province of Poland
- Capital: Wrocław; 51°6′N 17°1′E
- Religion: Roman Catholic
- Government: Feudal monarchy
- Historical era: High Middle Ages
  - Established: 1138
  - Duke Władysław II exiled: 1146
  - Racibórz split off: 1172
  - Opole split off: 1172
  - Głogów split off: 1177
  - Głogów reintegrated: c. 1185
  - Battle of Legnica: 1241
  - Lubusz split off: 1241
  - Lubusz reintegrated: 1242
  - Legnica split off: 1248
  - Nysa split off: 1290
  - Incorporated by Bohemia: 1335
  - Land of the Bohemian Crown: 1348
Preceded by
Duchy of Poland
Succeeded by
Duchy of Silesia (Bohemian Crown)
∟Duchy of Racibórz
∟Duchy of Opole
∟Duchy of Legnica
∟Duchy of Brzeg
Archdiocese of Wrocław
- Today part of: Poland; Czech Republic; Germany

The Duchy of Silesia (Polish: Księstwo Śląskie, German: Herzogtum Schlesien, Czech: Slezské knížectví, Silesian: Ślōnski firsztyntōm) with its capital at Wrocław was a medieval provincial duchy of Poland located in the region of Silesia.

Soon after it was formed under the Piast dynasty in 1138, it fragmented into various Silesian duchies. In 1327, the remaining Duchy of Wrocław as well as most other duchies ruled by the Silesian Piasts passed under the suzerainty of the Kingdom of Bohemia as the Duchies of Silesia. The acquisition was completed when King Casimir III the Great of Poland renounced his rights to Silesia in the 1335 Treaty of Trentschin.

== Geography ==
During the time of its establishment, the Silesian lands covered the basin of the upper and middle Oder river. In the south the Sudetes mountain range up to the Moravian Gate formed the border with the lands of Bohemia – including Kłodzko Land – and Moravia. After a more than century-long struggle, the boundary had just been determined by an 1137 agreement with the Bohemian duke Soběslav I. In the west Lower Silesia bordered on the German March of Lusatia (later Lower Lusatia) and the former Milceni lands around Bautzen (later Upper Lusatia) with the boundary running along the Bóbr and Kwisa rivers. Silesia was limited by the Polish provinces of Greater Poland in the north and the Seniorate Province of Lesser Poland in the east, separated by the Przemsza and Biała rivers.

The boundaries varied slightly in the following decades: at least when the duchy was re-established for the sons of Władysław II the Exile in 1163 (see below), it also comprised Lubusz Land northwest of Krosno, which had been the western outpost of Greater Poland and passed to the margraves of Brandenburg in 1248. In 1177 the Polish High Duke Casimir II the Just attached the former Lesser Polish castellanies of Bytom, Oświęcim, Zator, Siewierz und Pszczyna to Upper Silesia in favour of Duke Mieszko IV Tanglefoot. After Silesia as a whole had become a Bohemian fief according to the 1335 Treaty of Trentschin, these lordships – except for the state countries of Bytom and Pszczyna – returned to the Polish Crown.

== History ==
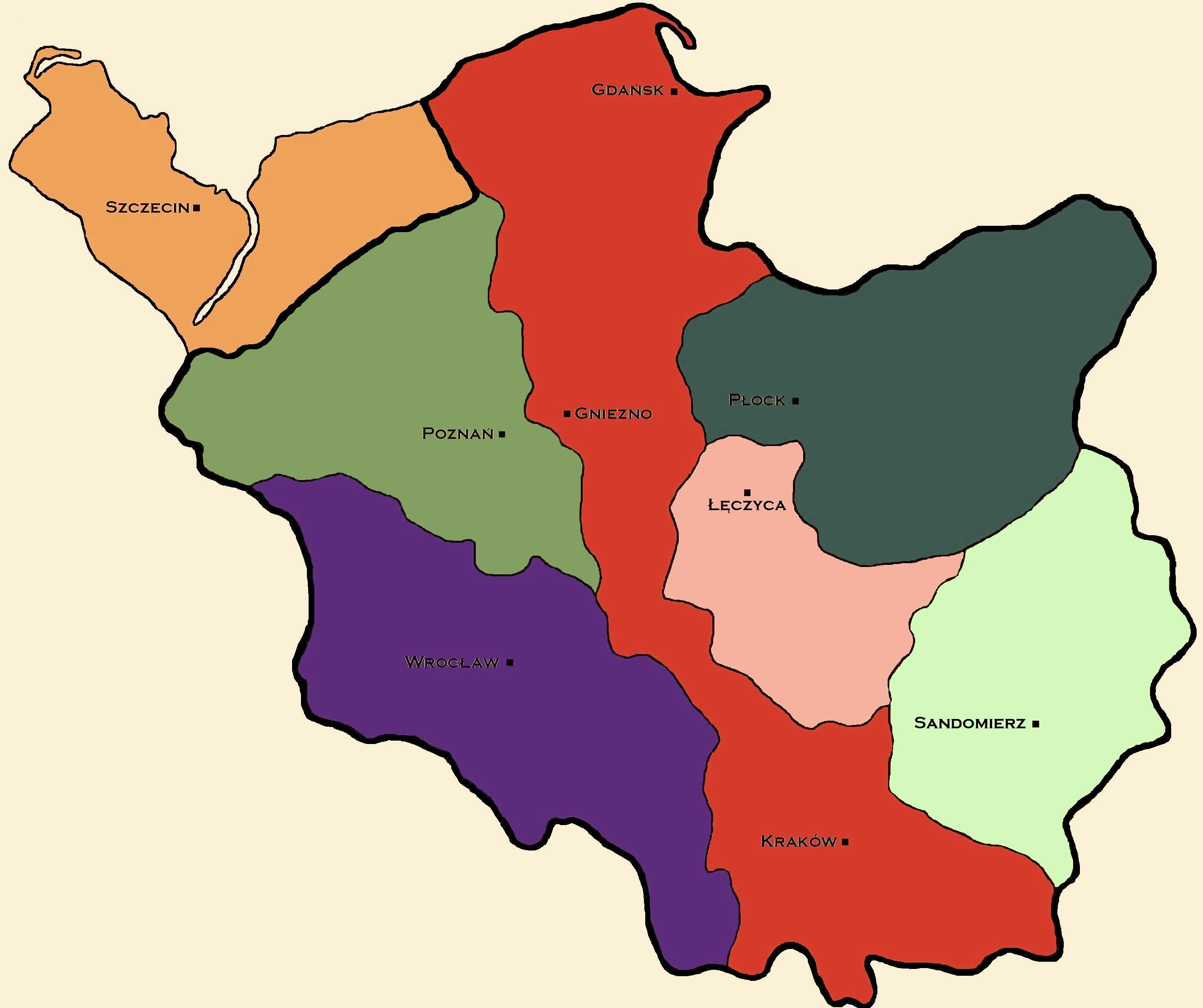
Fragmentation of Poland in 1138: Duchy of Silesia under Władysław II

As the Silesian Province (Polish: dzielnica śląska), the duchy was one of five main provinces established in medieval Poland according to the Testament of Bolesław III Krzywousty. By the terms of the will from 1138–1146 it was controlled by the Senior Duke of Poland or High duke, Bolesław's first-born son Władysław II the Exile, who also held the Duchy of Kraków.

The testament however failed to prevent a violent inheritance conflict between Władysław and his younger half-brothers, who allied against him. After his failed bid to take control of the entire Kingdom in 1146, he lost his status as the senior duke, was excommunicated by Archbishop Jakub ze Żnina of Gniezno and fled to the Holy Roman Empire. The duchy was then under control of his half-brother High Duke Bolesław IV the Curly.

With support from Emperor Frederick I Barbarossa, who had campaigned in Greater Poland in 1157 and forced Bolesław IV to cede Silesia, Władysław's sons were able to return to the duchy in 1163. As long as they were under pressure by High Duke Bolesław IV, they ruled jointly at Wrocław, until tensions between them erupted into an open conflict in 1172. As a result, the brothers divided the duchy among themselves; the first partition of many which led to the creation of numerous Silesian duchies in the following centuries:

- Władysław's eldest son, Bolesław I the Tall, received Lower Silesia with Wrocław as his residence; therefore his estates are sometimes already referred to as Duchy of Wrocław.
- The second son, Mieszko I Tanglefoot, received a far smaller part in Upper Silesia and took his residence at Racibórz; this resulted in the creation of the Duchy of Racibórz. In view of his disadvantage, the Polish High Duke Casimir II the Just ceded him further Lesser Polish territories in 1177 (see above).

After a revolt by Bolesław's eldest son, Jarosław, who feared for his heritage, his father ceded him a strip of land around Opole, for the first time creating the Duchy of Opole. In turn Jarosław had to prepare for an ecclesiastical career and remain celibate. Likewise Bolesław's and Mieszko's youngest brother, Konrad Spindleshanks, when he came of age claimed his rights and about 1177 received the Lower Silesian lands around Głogów; leading to the first creation of the Duchy of Głogów. However, Bolesław I outlived both his youngest brother and his son, and both territories fell back to him in 1190 and 1201 resp.

Bolesław I died in the same year and was succeeded by his only surviving son Henry I the Bearded, who soon entered into conflict with his Piast relatives as well as with his German neighbours. In 1202 he had to face the invasion of his uncle Mieszko I, who, still dissatisfied with the 1172 partition, annexed the Opole territory of late Jarosław. The Duchy of Opole remained with the estates of Mieszko's descendants, whereby the secession of Upper Silesia was conclusive. In 1206 Henry I came to an agreement with the Polish High Duke Władysław III Spindleshanks to swap Lubusz Land for the Greater Polish Kalisz region. The plan however was foiled, when Władysław III lost the seniorate and furthermore Lubusz was occupied by the troops of the Wettin margrave Conrad II of Lusatia. Duke Henry had to struggle for his northwestern outpost, which he regained upon the margrave's death in 1210. He had to defend Lubusz once more against the campaigns of Landgrave Louis IV of Thuringia from 1221. Upon the death of his cousin Duke Casimir I of Opole, son of Mieszko I Tanglefoot, in 1230, he acted as guardian of his minor nephews, thereby once again ruling over whole Silesia. In 1232 he became High Duke of Poland, and as he was able to secure the succession of his son Henry II the Pious upon his death in 1238, it seemed that the Polish fragmentation could be overcome and the will of Bolesław III Krzywousty would finally be fulfilled.

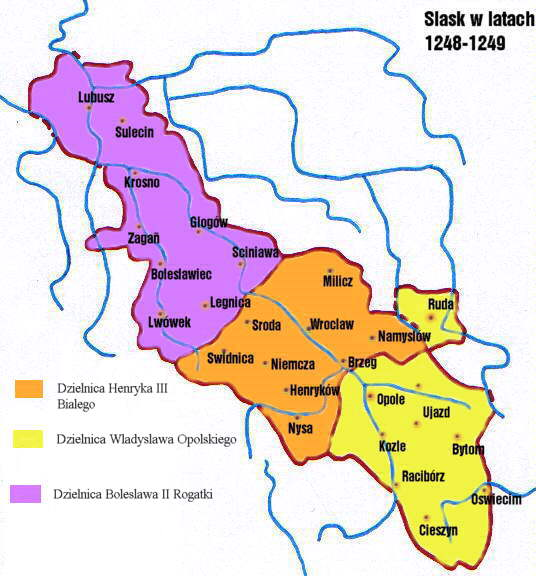
Silesia in 1248/49: Duchy of Legnica under Bolesław II Duchy of Wrocław under Henry III Duchy of Opole under Władysław

Henry II in 1239 had to resign the regency of Upper Silesia in favour of his cousin Mieszko II the Fat. He anew defended Lubusz, this time against the forces of the Ascanian margraves of Brandenburg, and in 1241 granted it to his second son Mieszko. The hopes for a re-unification of the Polish lands under the Silesian Piasts ended with the Mongol invasion of Poland and Henry's death at the 1241 Battle of Legnica. His eldest son Bolesław II the Bald could not prevail as High Duke against Bolesław V the Chaste of Lesser Poland and, after he regained Lubusz upon the death of his brother Mieszko in 1242, finally had to divide his Silesian heritage with his younger brothers in 1248:

- Bolesław II himself took his residence in the west at Legnica, thereby establishing the Duchy of Legnica together with his youngest brother Konrad. Soon after he sold Lubusz to the Brandenburg margraves, who finally gained a foothold beyond the Oder to establish the Neumark region. In 1251 Konrad, actually elected Bishop of Passau, forced Bolesław to cede the Duchy of Głogów to him.
- The residence of Wrocław fell to his younger brothers Henry III the White and Władysław, thereby establishing the Duchy of Wrocław proper.

The subdivision of the Silesian duchies increased over the following generations and accompanied the fragmentation of Poland. Henry's III son Henry IV Probus, upon the death of his uncle Władysław in 1270, ruled at Wrocław and in 1288 even became High Duke of Poland, until the male line became extinct with his death in 1290. He was succeeded by his cousin Duke Henry V the Fat, son of Henry's III brother Bolesław II, who once again re-united the duchies of Wrocław and Legnica under his personal rule. The duchy lost its southern territories in 1290–1291, i.e. the Kłodzko Land, which passed to Bohemia, and the towns of Świdnica, Rychbach, Ząbkowice, Ziębice and Strzelin, which passed to the Duchy of Jawor after Duke Bolko I the Strict of Jawor supported Henry V's assumption of the Duchy of Wrocław. Nevertheless, upon the death of Henry V in 1296, his heritage was again partitioned among his sons. The second, Duke Henry VI the Good, in order to ward off claims raised by his elder brother Duke Bolesław III the Generous of Legnica, in 1327 signed an inheritance treaty with King John of Bohemia, like most of the Silesian duchies had been vassalized by the Kingdom of Bohemia in the early 14th century. As the Polish king Casimir III in the 1335 Treaty of Trentschin had renounced Silesia, Henry's VI duchy passed without opposition to the Bohemian kingdom when he died without male heirs three months later.

Silesia was incorporated into the Lands of the Bohemian Crown under the Holy Roman Empire, after King Casimir III had acknowledged the acquisition by the 1348 Treaty of Namysłów with King Charles IV — except for the Upper Silesian duchies of Oświęcim and Zator, which, though held as Bohemian fiefs for a time, later passed into Polish control and were incorporated into the Kraków Voivodeship in the 16th century, and for the Duchy of Siewierz, which had been purchased by the Archbishop of Kraków in 1443.

== Dukes ==
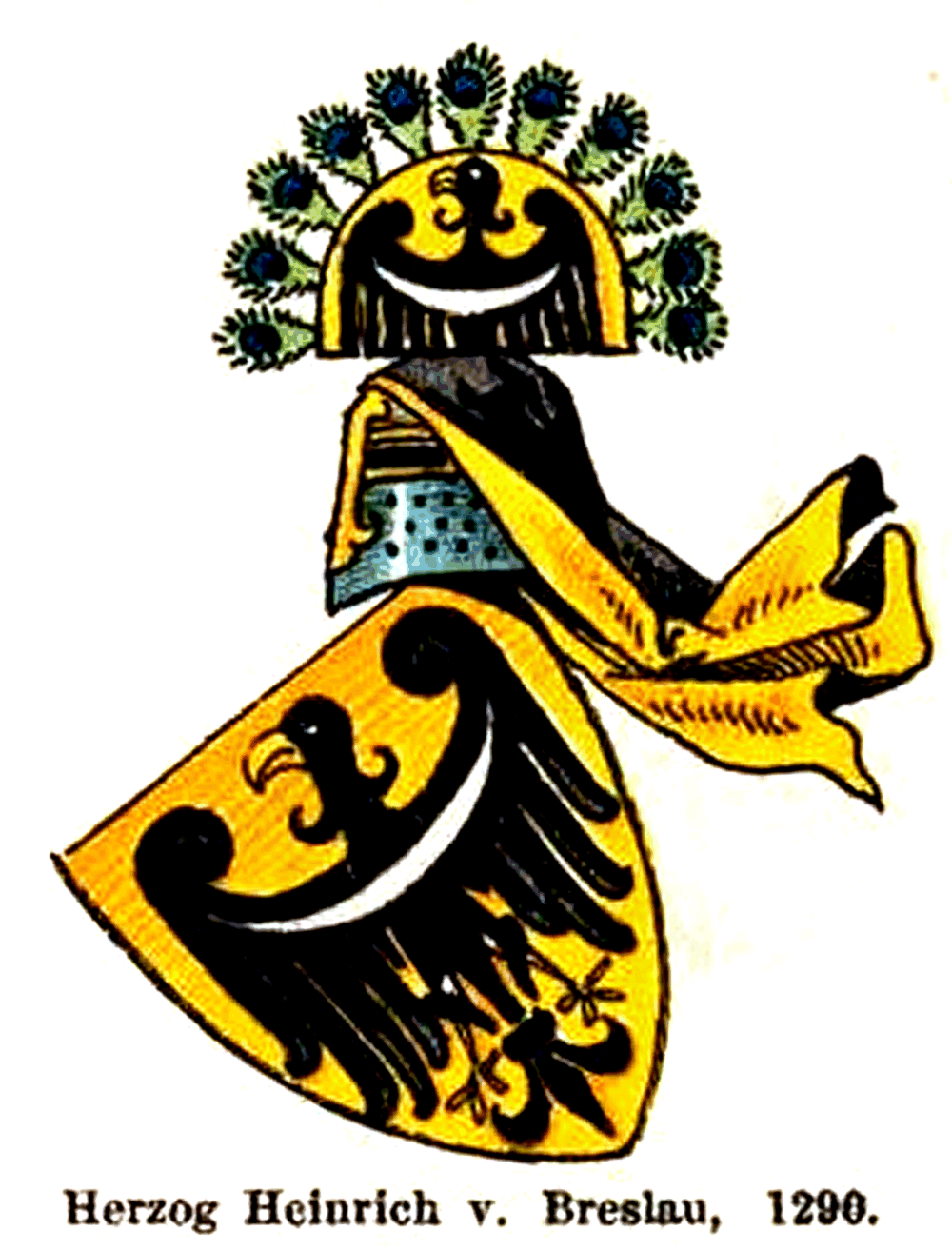
Full coat of arms of the duke 1290

- Władysław the Exile (1138–1146), progenitor of the Silesian Piasts, also High Duke of Poland, deposed
  - Bolesław the Curly (1146–1163), stepbrother
- Bolesław I the Tall, eldest son of Władysław, re-installed (1163–1201)
- Henry I the Bearded (1201–1238), son, also High Duke of Poland from 1232
- Henry II the Pious (1238–1241), son, also High Duke of Poland, killed in Battle of Legnica
- Bolesław II the Bald (1241–1248), son, became Duke of Legnica in 1248 partition
- Henry III the White (1248–1266), brother, jointly with
  - Władysław (1248–1270), brother, also Archbishop of Salzburg from 1265
- Henry IV Probus (1266–1290), son of Henry III, Duke of Wrocław from 1270, also High Duke of Poland from 1288, no issue
- Henry V the Fat (1290–1296), son of Bolesław II, Duke of Legnica since 1278
- Henry VI the Good (1296–1335), second son, under tutelage of:
  - Bolko I the Strict (1296–1301), son of Bolesław II
  - King Wenceslaus II of Bohemia (1301–1305)
  - Bolesław III the Generous (1305–1311), eldest son of Henry V, Duke of Legnica since 1296

As Henry VI left no male heirs, his lands were inherited by King John of Bohemia.

== Maps ==
The following maps illustrate continuing fragemtarization of the Duchy of Silesia, and shifting borders of the individual smaller duchies.

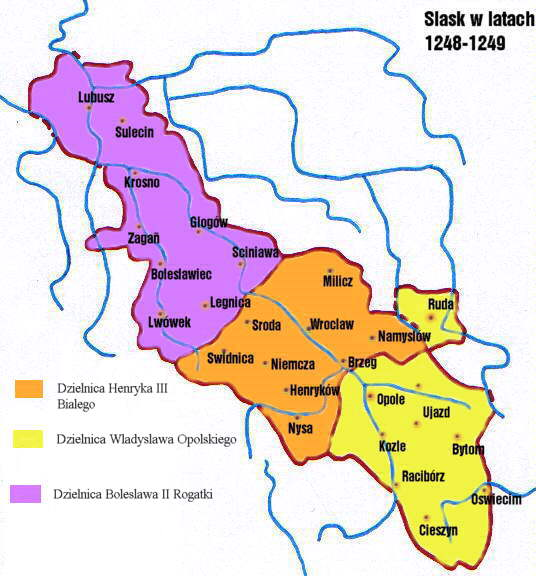
1248–1249

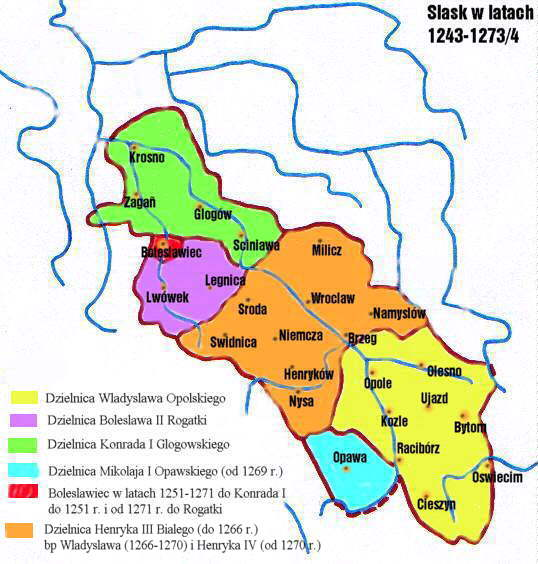
1249–1273

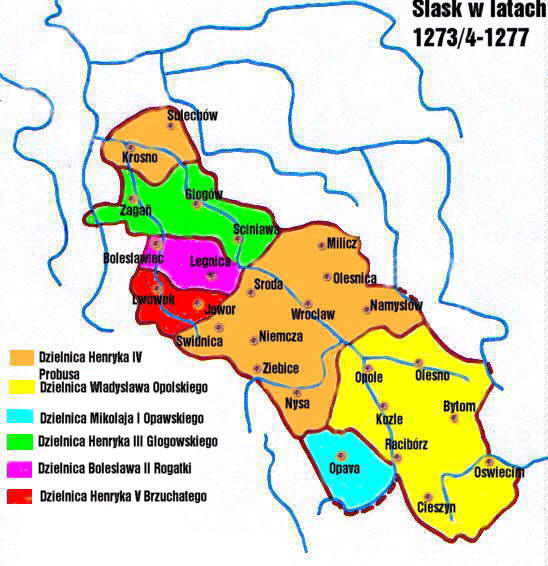
1273–1277

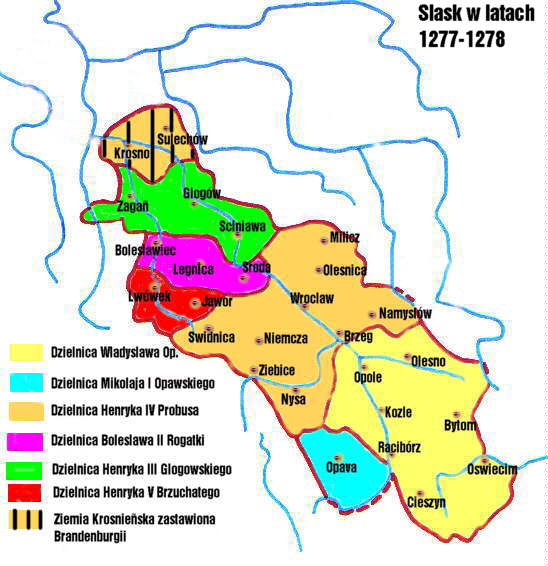
1277–1278

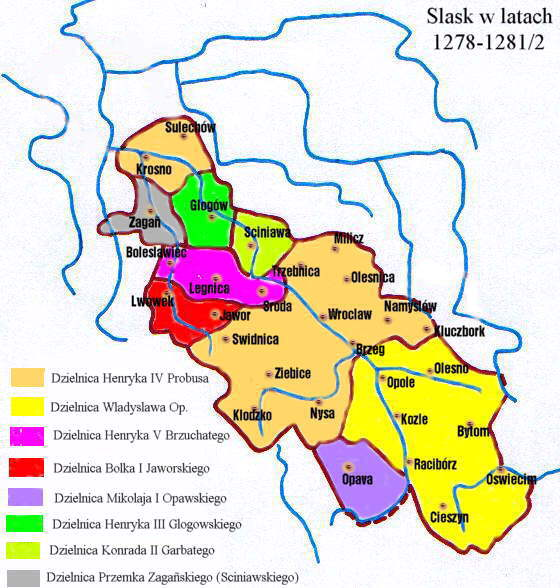
1278–1281

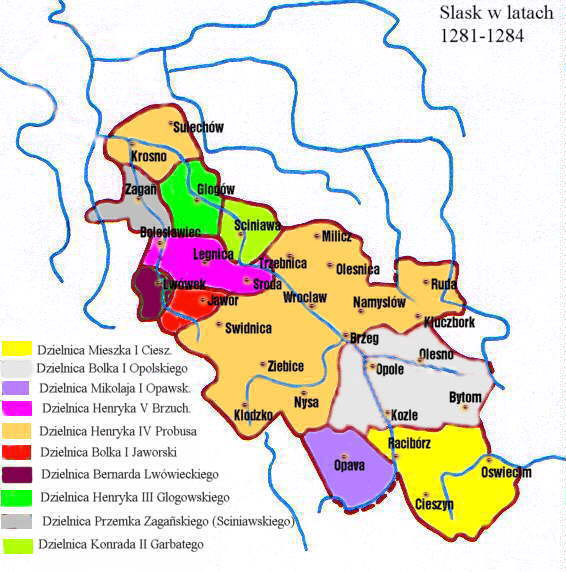
1281–1284

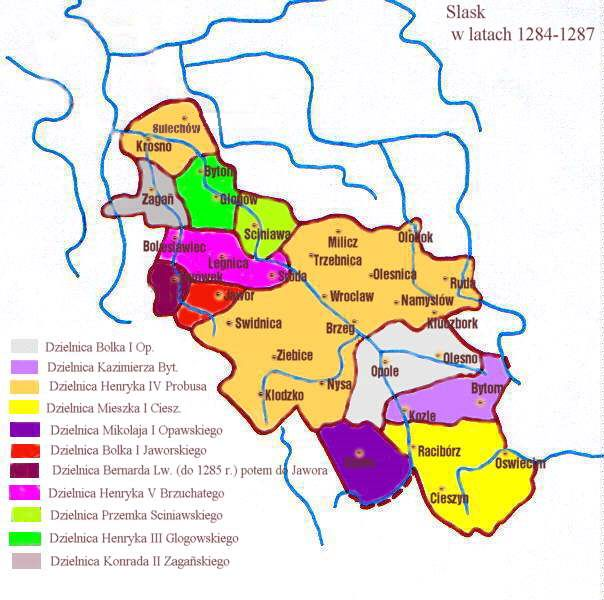
1284–1287

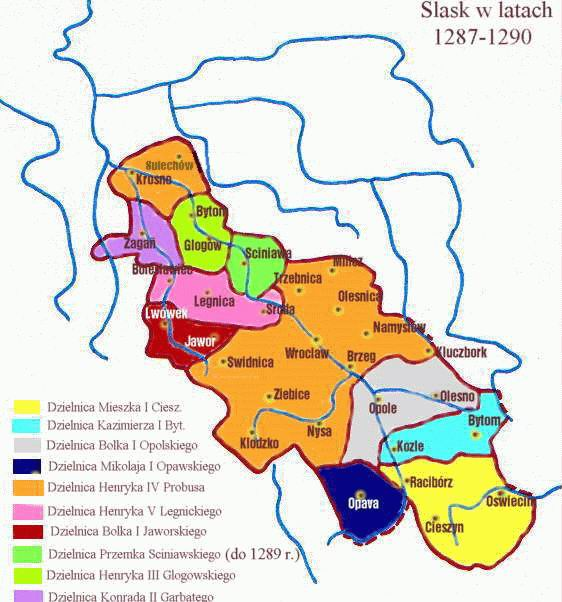
1287–1290

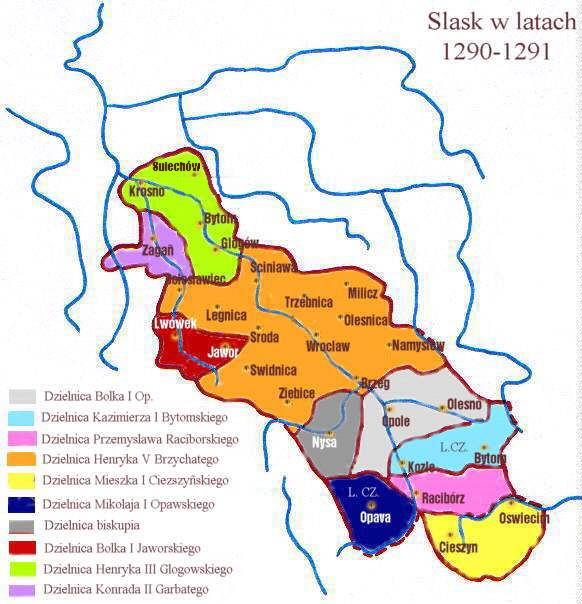
1290–1291

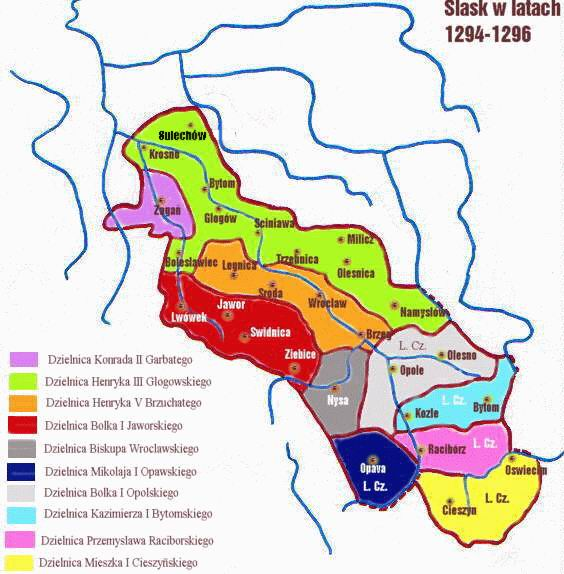
1294–1296

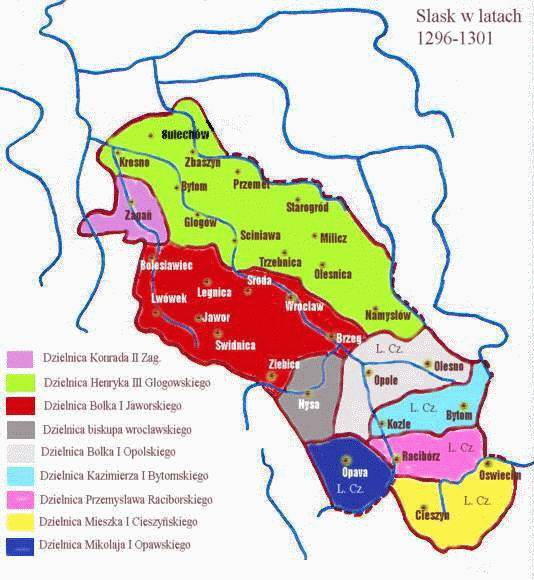
1296–1301

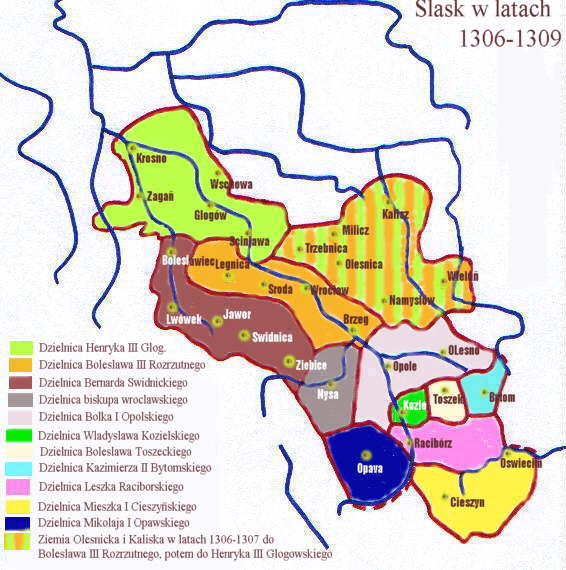
1306–1309

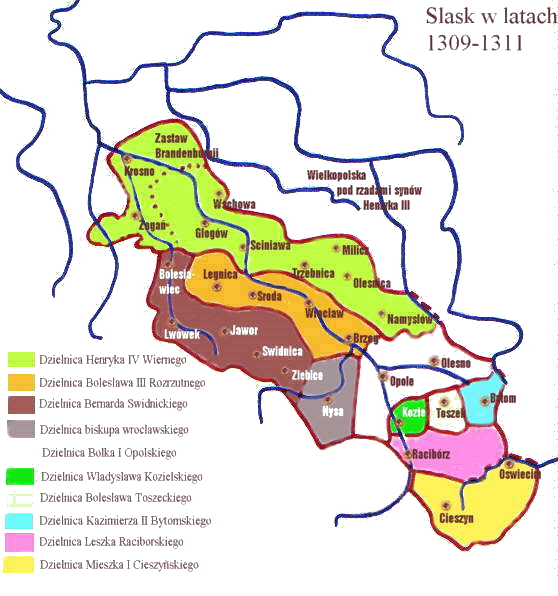
1309–1311

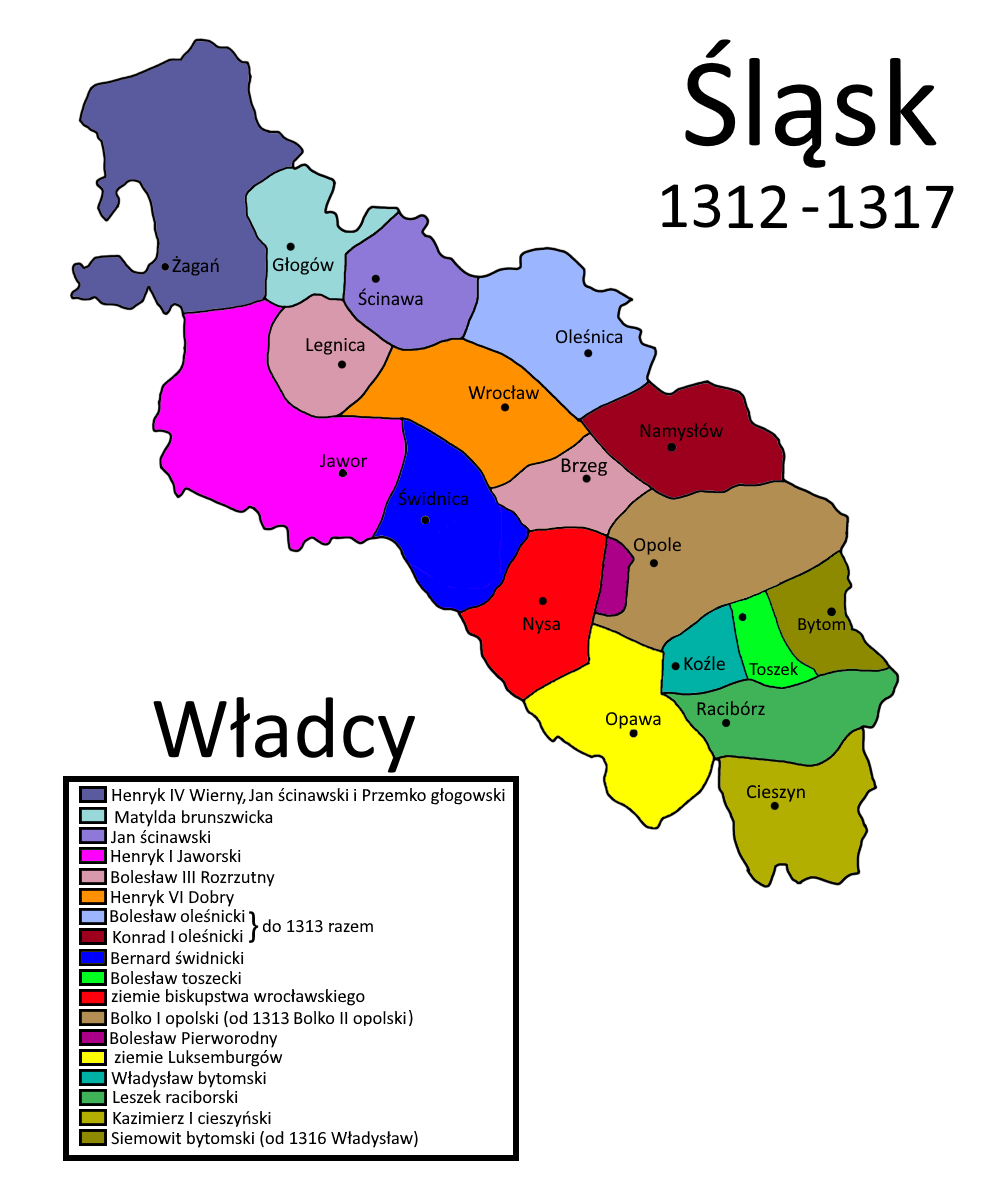
1312–1317

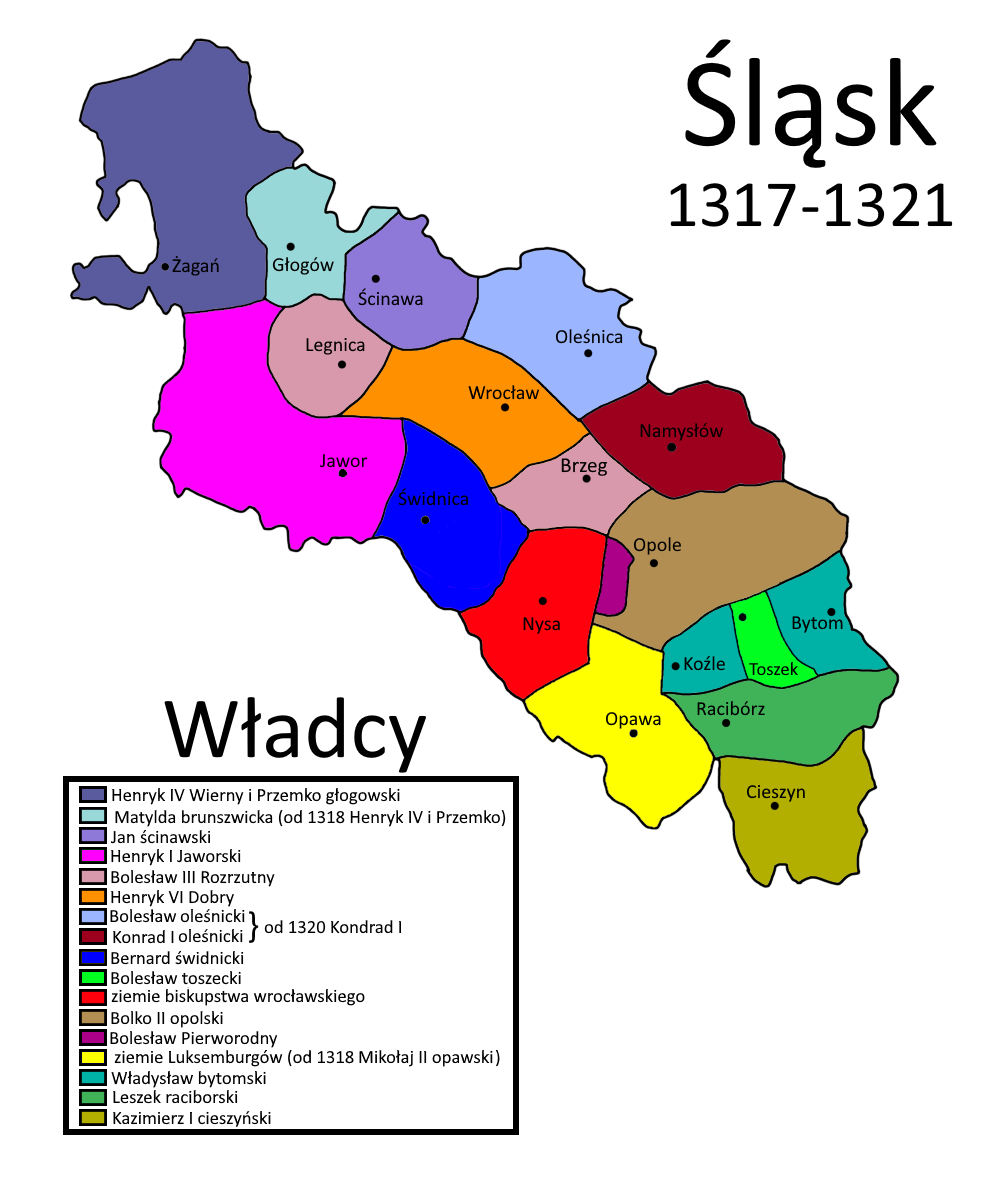
1317–1321

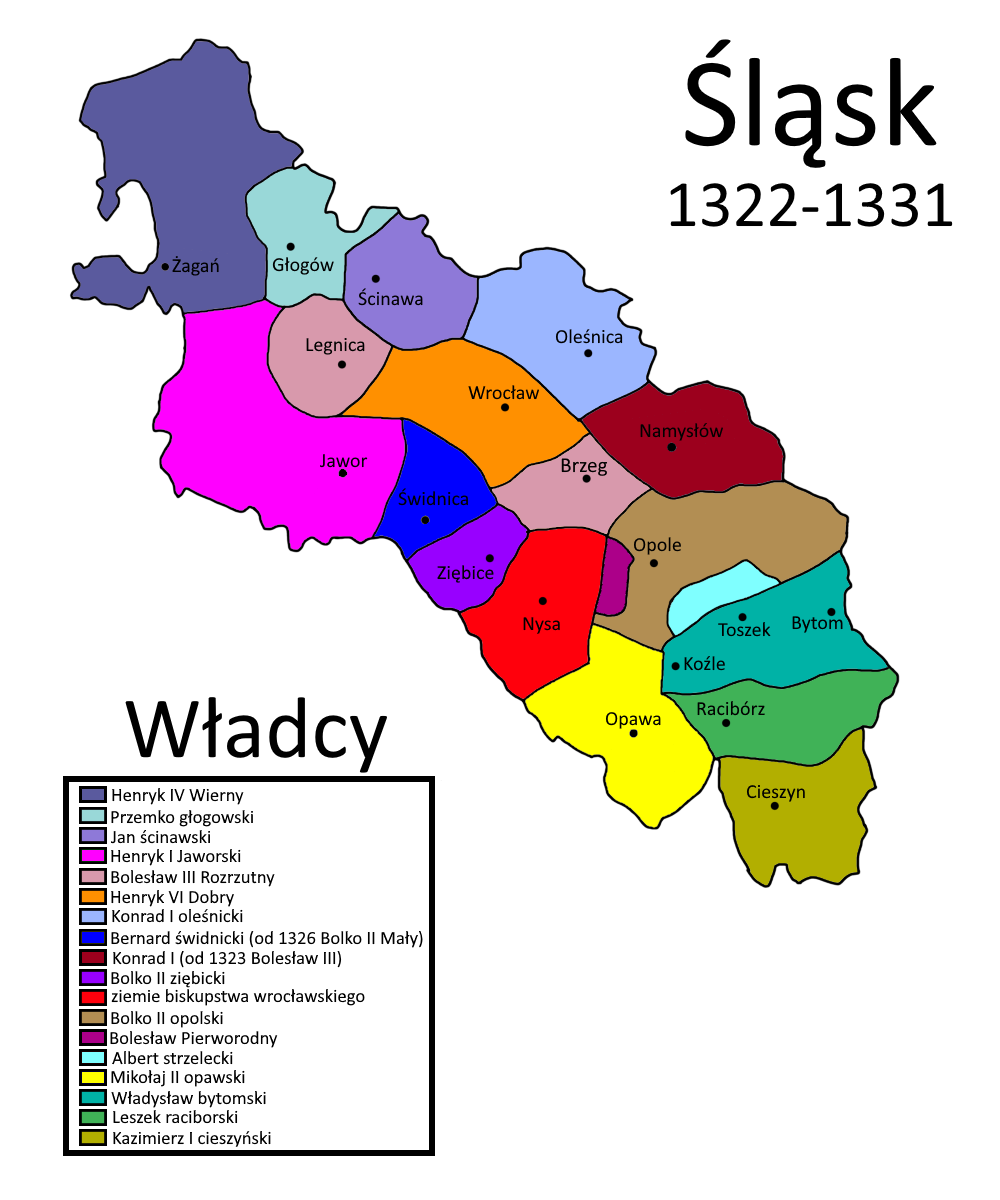
1322–1331

== Aftermath ==
After the inheritance of Bohemia by the House of Habsburg in 1526, the Silesian duchies gradually passed under control of the Austrian Habsburg monarchy until King Frederick II of Prussia invaded Silesia in 1740 and annexed most of it during the First Silesian War. The bulk of the duchy, enlarged by the County of Kladsko and Upper Lusatian territories annexed from Saxony, was subsequently reorganized as part of the Prussian Province of Silesia, while the duchies remaining under Austrian control were reconstituted as the Duchy of Upper and Lower Silesia in 1742. The duchies which had remained in Poland were subsequently annexed by the Kingdom of Prussia (New Silesia) and the Habsburg monarchy (Galicia) during the 18th century Partitions of Poland. The Duchy of Upper and Lower Silesia lasted as a crown land of Cisleithanian Austria until 1918, whereupon it was divided between the Second Polish Republic (Autonomous Silesian Voivodeship) and Czechoslovakia (Czech Silesia) after the Polish–Czechoslovak War of 1919.
