= Mixdorf station =

Railway station in Germany

Mixdorf

General information
- Location: Am Bahnhof 1a 15299 Mixdorf; Brandenburg; Germany
- Coordinates: 52.1975°N 14.3944°E
- Owner: DB Netz
- Operator: DB Station&Service
- Lines: Cottbus–Frankfurt (Oder) railway (KBS 209.36)
- Platforms: 1 side platform
- Tracks: 1
- Train operators: Niederbarnimer Eisenbahn

Other information
- Station code: 4142
- DS100 code: BMX
- IBNR: 8012370
- Category: 7
- Fare zone: VBB: 6271
- Website: www.bahnhof.de

Services
Preceding station	Niederbarnimer Eisenbahn	Following station
Grunow (Niederlausitz) towards Königs Wusterhausen	RB 36	Müllrose towards Frankfurt (Oder)
Location
- Location within Brandenburg

Mixdorf station is a railway station in the municipality of Mixdorf, located in the Oder-Spree district in Brandenburg, Germany.
