= Duchy of Lubusz =

Former duchy of medieval Poland

Duchy of Lubusz Księstwo lubuskie (Polish) Ducatus Lubucensis (Latin)
- 1241–1242
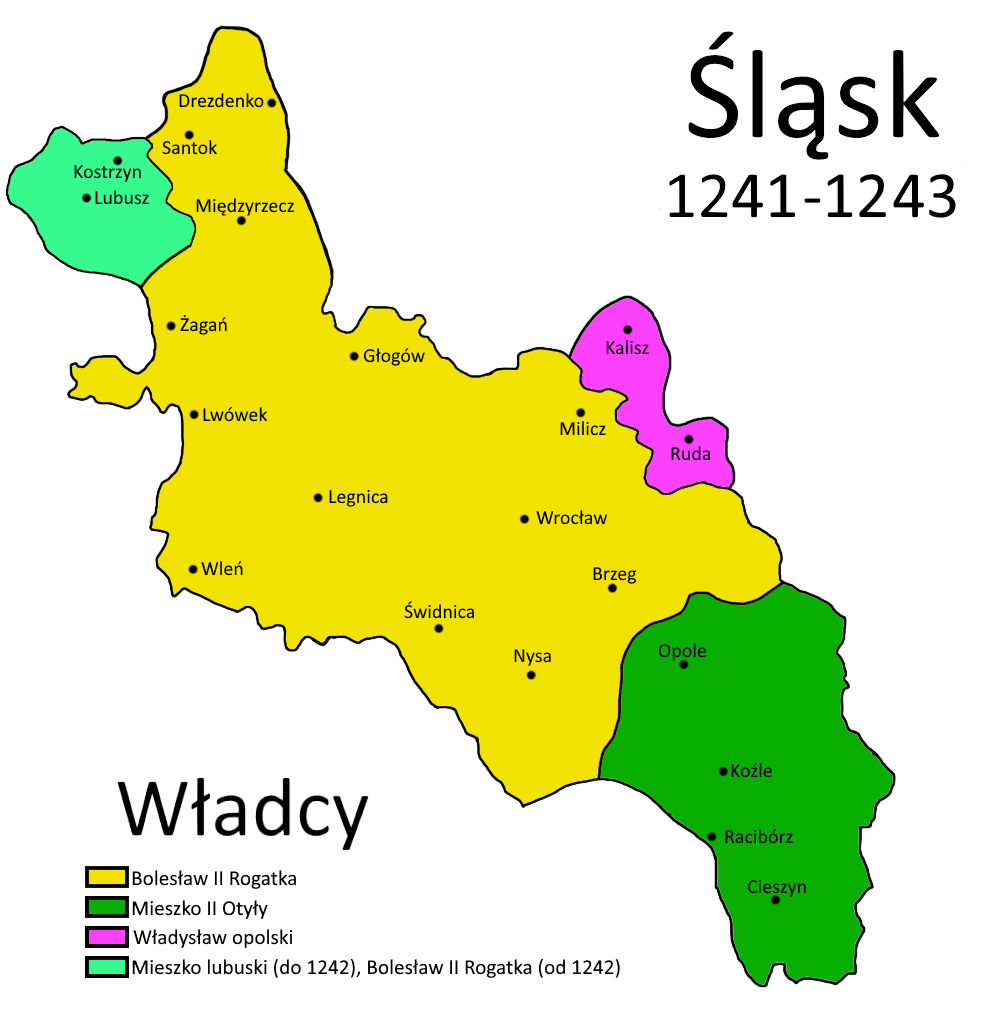
- The map of the duchies controlled by the Silesian Piast dynasty from 1241 to 1243, including the Duchy of Lubusz in the north-west
- Status: District duchy of Poland
- Capital: Lebus
- Official languages: Polish, Latin
- Religion: Roman Catholic
- Duke
  - 1241–1242: Mieszko of Lubusz
- Historical era: High Middle Ages
  - Partition from the Duchy of Silesia: 1241
  - Incorporation into the Duchy of Silesia: 1242
| Preceded by | Succeeded by |
| Duchy of Silesia | Duchy of Silesia |
- Today part of: Poland; Germany

The Duchy of Lubusz (Note: Polish: Księstwo lubuskie; German: Herzogtum Lebus; Latin: Ducatus Lubucensis) was a short-lived feudal district duchy of medieval Poland in the Lubusz Land. Its capital was set in Lebus. It was formed in 1241 from the portion of the territory of the Duchy of Silesia, and existed until 1242, when it was incorporated back into it. Its only ruler was Duke Mieszko of Lubusz of the Silesian Piast dynasty.

== History ==
The Duchy of Lubusz was created in 1241, from the portion of the territory of the Duchy of Silesia, with Duke Mieszko of Lubusz becoming its ruler. He was given its territory following the death of his father Henry II the Pious, ruler of Silesia, on 9 April 1241. Mieszko was at the time probably about 14 years old and received those lands temporarily until he would reached adulthood to rule the rest of the Duchy of Silesia together with his older brothers. He died in 1242, and the Duchy of Lubusz was incorporated back into the Duchy of Silesia.

== List of rulers ==
- 1241–1242: Mieszko of Lubusz
