= Philip V. Bohlman =

American academic

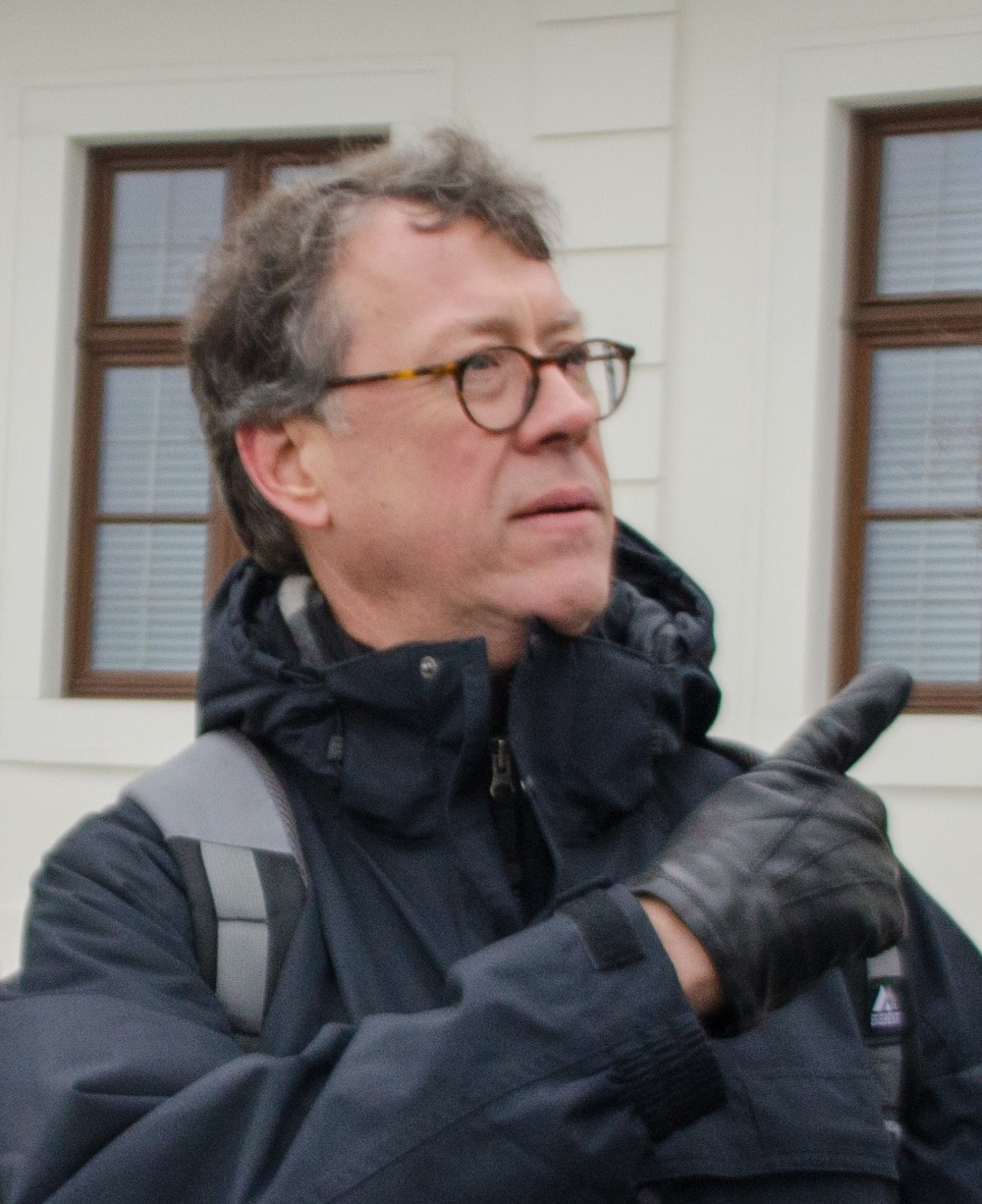
- Bohlman in 2012
- Born: Philip Vilas Bohlman; August 8, 1952 (age 73); Boscobel, Wisconsin, U.S.
- Occupation: Ethnomusicologist

Philip Vilas Bohlman (born August 8, 1952) is an American ethnomusicologist.

== Life and career ==
He is the Ludwig Rosenberger Distinguished Service Professor in Jewish History, Music and the Humanities at the University of Chicago and a visiting professor at the Hochschule für Musik und Theater (Hannover). At Chicago, Bohlman is on the resource faculty of the Germanic Studies Department, the Mary Marty Center for the Advanced Study of Religion, the Center for Jewish Studies, the Center for European and Russian/Eurasian Studies, the Divinity School, and the Scherer Center for the Study of American Culture. Bohlman has held guest professorships at numerous universities, including the University of California, Berkeley, the University of Freiburg, the University of Vienna, and Yale University, among others. Bohlman received his doctorate from the University of Illinois in 1984 and has been teaching at Chicago since 1987.

Bohlman's research has been funded by the Alexander von Humboldt Foundation and often includes fieldwork in Kolkata and Varanasi, India, and throughout Germany, with current fieldwork in India and the Muslim communities of Europe. Bohlman's research focuses on Jewish music and modernity. Bohlman also frequently engages in intensive studies of the Eurovision Song Contest.

Bohlman is also the Artistic Director of “The New Budapest Orpheum Society” at the University of Chicago. In conjunction with his work with that group, Oxford University bestowed the 2009 Donald Tovey Prize on Bohlman and Christine Wilkie Bohlman. Bohlman was inducted into the American Academy of Arts and Sciences as a fellow in 2011, and into the British Academy as a corresponding fellow in 2007. In 1997, he was the first ethnomusicologist to receive the Edward J. Dent Medal from the Royal Musical Association, and also received the Berlin Prize from the American Academy in Berlin in 2003, the Derek Allen Prize from the British Academy in 2007, and a Faculty Award for Excellence in Graduate Teaching from the University of Chicago in 1999. Bohlman served as the president of the Society for Ethnomusicology from 2005 to 2007. In 2014 the University of Kassel awarded him the Rosenzweig professorship. In 2022 he was awarded the Balzan Prize for Ethnomusicology.

== Partial list of books ==
- Wie sängen wir Seinen Gesang auf dem Boden der Fremde? Jüdische Musik des Aschkenas zwischen Tradition und Moderne (2019)
- Song Loves the Masses: Herder on Music and Nationalism (2017)
- Revival and Reconciliation: Sacred Music in the Making of European Modernity (2013)
- with Nada Petković, Balkan Epic: Song, History, Modernity (2012)
- Focus: Music, Nationalism, and the Making of the New Europe (2010)
- Jewish Musical Modernism, Old and New (2009)
- with Marcello Sorce Keller and Loris Azzaroni (eds.), Musical Anthropology of the Mediterranean: Interpretation, Performance, Identity (2009)
- Jewish Music and Modernity (2008)
- Music in American Religious Experience (2005)
- with Ronald Michael Radano, Music and the Racial Imagination: Cultural Topics (2005)
- Jüdische Volksmusik: eine mitteleuopäische Geistesgeschichte (2005)
- Excursions in World Music (2004)
- with Martin Stokes, Celtic Modern: Music at the Global Fringe (2003)
- New Music and Modernity: Music and Culture (2003)
- World Music: A Very Short Introduction (2002)
- with Otto Holzapfel, Land Without Nightingales: Music in the Making of German-America (Madison, WI: Max Kade Institute for German-American Studies, 2002)
- with Otto Holzapfel, The Folk Songs of Ashkenaz (Middleton, WI: A-R Editions, 2001; Recent Researches in the Oral Traditions of Music, 6)
- Music and the Racial Imagination (2000-2001)
- Excursions in World Music (1999)
- Enchanting Powers: Music in the World's Religions (1997)
- Central European Folk Music: An Annotated Bibliography of Sources in German (1996)
- Oral Traditions, Israeli Folk Music: Songs of the Early Pioneers (1994)
- Ethnomusicology and Modern Music History (1993)
- The World Center for Jewish Music in Palestine, 1936-1940: Jewish Musical Life on the Eve of World War II (1992)
- with Katherine Bergeron, Disciplining Music: Musicology and its canons (1992)
- with Bruno Nettl (eds.), Comparative Musicology and Anthropology of Music: Essays on the History of Ethnomusicology (1991)
- The Land Where Two Streams Flow: Music in the German-Jewish Community of Israel (1989)
- The Study of Folk Music in the Modern World (1988)
