= Grunow (Niederlausitz) station =

Railway station in Germany

Grunow (Niederlausitz)

General information
- Location: Am Bahnhof/Bahnhofstraße; 15299 Grunow-Dammendorf; Brandenburg; Germany
- Coordinates: 52.1654°N 14.3788°E
- Owner: DB Netz
- Operator: DB Station&Service
- Lines: Königs Wusterhausen–Grunow railway (KBS 209.36); Cottbus–Frankfurt (Oder) railway (KBS 209.36)
- Platforms: 1 side platform
- Tracks: 2
- Train operators: Niederbarnimer Eisenbahn

Other information
- Station code: 2400
- DS100 code: BGRU
- IBNR: 8010150
- Category: 6
- Fare zone: VBB: 6371
- Website: www.bahnhof.de

Services
Preceding station	Niederbarnimer Eisenbahn	Following station
Schneeberg (Mark) towards Königs Wusterhausen	RB 36	Mixdorf towards Frankfurt (Oder)
Location
- Location within Brandenburg

Grunow (Niederlausitz) station is a railway station in the municipality of Grunow-Dammendorf, located in the Oder-Spree district in Brandenburg, Germany.
