= Otto Holzapfel =

German folklorist and researcher

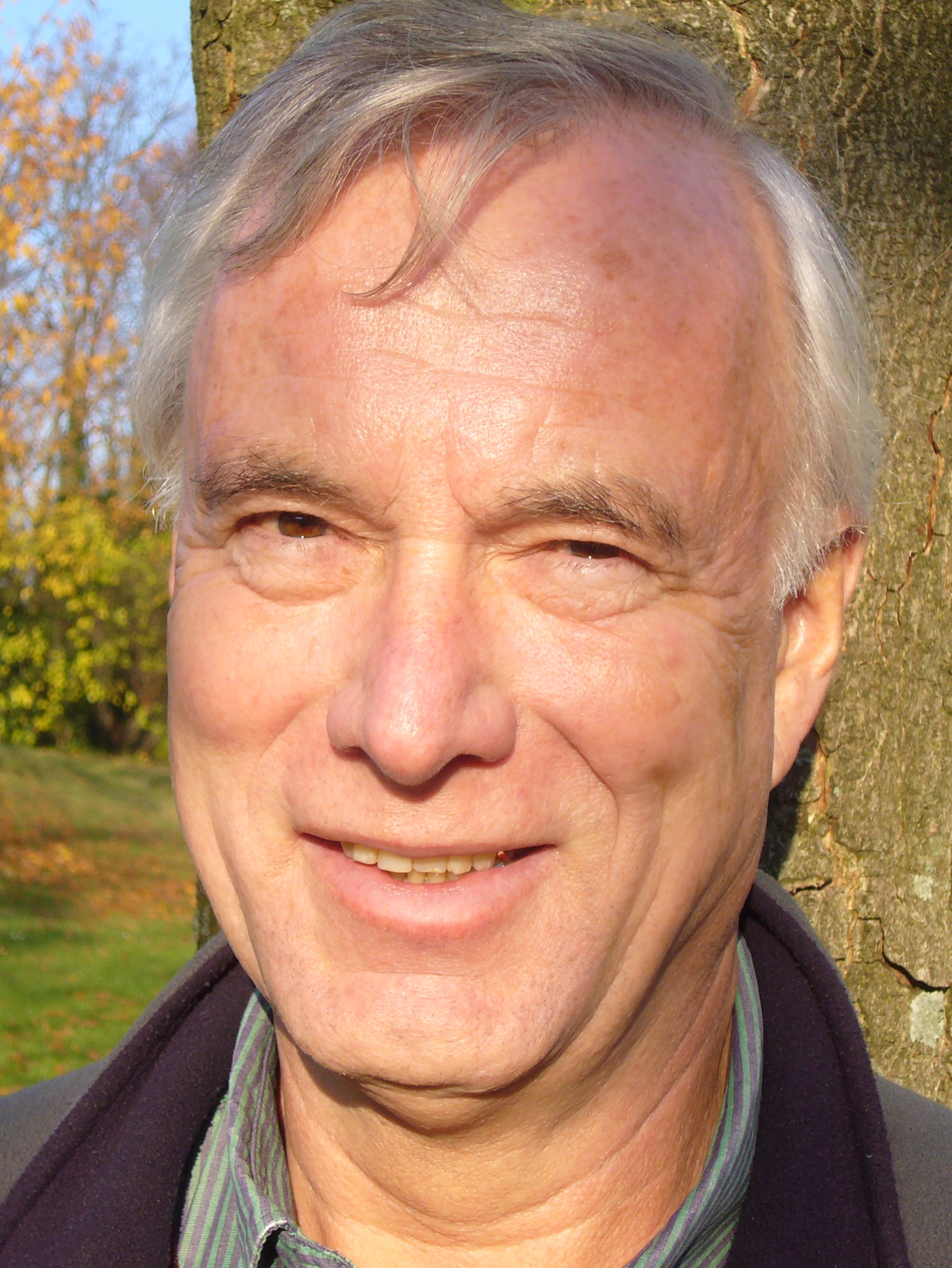
Holzapfel in 2008

Otto Holzapfel (born February 5, 1941, in Beeskow) is a German folklorist and researcher of traditional German folk song (folk music, Lied). He is a retired professor at the University of Freiburg. His mother tongue is Danish. He studied in Frankfurt am Main; among his subjects were Scandinavian languages and literature with Klaus von See. In 1970 he was appointed curator (archivist) at the German Folk Song Archives in Freiburg, now Center for Popular Culture and Music, University of Freiburg. He led this institute until 1996. He was co-editor of the journal Jahrbuch für Volksliedforschung from 1984 to 1998 and editor of the Studien zur Volksliedforschung (volumes 1 – 17, 1991–1996). Special topics of Holzapfel are the traditional German folk ballad and the tradition of the German folk song, European mythology and German-Danish genealogy. He has edited several volumes of the standard edition of the traditional German folk ballads Deutsche Volkslieder mit ihren Melodien: Balladen (10 volumes, 1935–1996), and he created a system for analyzing German quatrains (Schnaderhüpfel, four line lyric stanzas, Gstanzl). Since 2006 he supervises the German song index (Liedverzeichnis), now online.

== Partial list of publications ==
- [with Julia McGrew and Iørn Piø, editors] The European Medieval Ballad: A Symposium. Odense, Denmark: University Press, 1978. ISBN 87-7492-239-4
- [with Flemming G. Andersen and Thomas Pettitt, editors] The Ballad as Narrative: Studies in the Ballad Traditions of England, Scotland, Germany and Denmark. Odense, Denmark: University Press, 1982. ISBN 87-7492-392-7
- „Graf und Nonne. An Analysis of the Epic-Formulaic Elements in a German Ballad“. In: Carol L. Edwards (editor): Narrative Folksong: New Directions. Boulder, CO 1985, p. 179–193. ISBN 978-0-96156-870-2
- Vierzeiler-Lexikon: Schnaderhüpfel, Gesätzle, Gestanzeln (Gstanzl), Rappeditzle, Neck-, Spott-, Tanzverse und verwandte Formen aus mündlicher Überlieferung (= Studien zur Volksliedforschung. 7–11). Volumes 1–5. Bern: Lang, 1991–1994. ISSN 0930-8636
- „Totenlieder deutscher Auswanderer in Kansas (USA)“. In: Jahrbuch für Volksliedforschung 31 (1986), p. 83–87.
- [with Philip V. Bohlman] The Folk Songs of Ashkenaz (= Recent Researches in the Oral Traditions of Music. 6). Middleton, WI 2001. ISBN 978-0-89579-474-1
- [with Philip V. Bohlman, editor] Land without Nightingales: Music in the Making of German-America. Madison, WI 2002. ISBN 978-0-92411-904-0
- „Singing from the Right Songbook: Ethnic Identity and Language Transformation in German American Hymnals“. In: Philip V. Bohlman (editor): Music in American Religious Experience. New York 2006, p. 175–194. ISBN 978-0-19517-304-8
- Liedverzeichnis: Die ältere deutschsprachige populäre Liedüberlieferung online Update Liedverzeichnis. Die ältere deutschsprachige populäre Liedüberlieferung. online Update March 2023 (17 PDF-Dateien, zusammen 159 MB). - Otto Holzapfel: Liedverzeichnis. Volumes 1–2. Hildesheim: Olms, 2006. ISBN 3-487-13100-5
