= Beeskow =

- Town
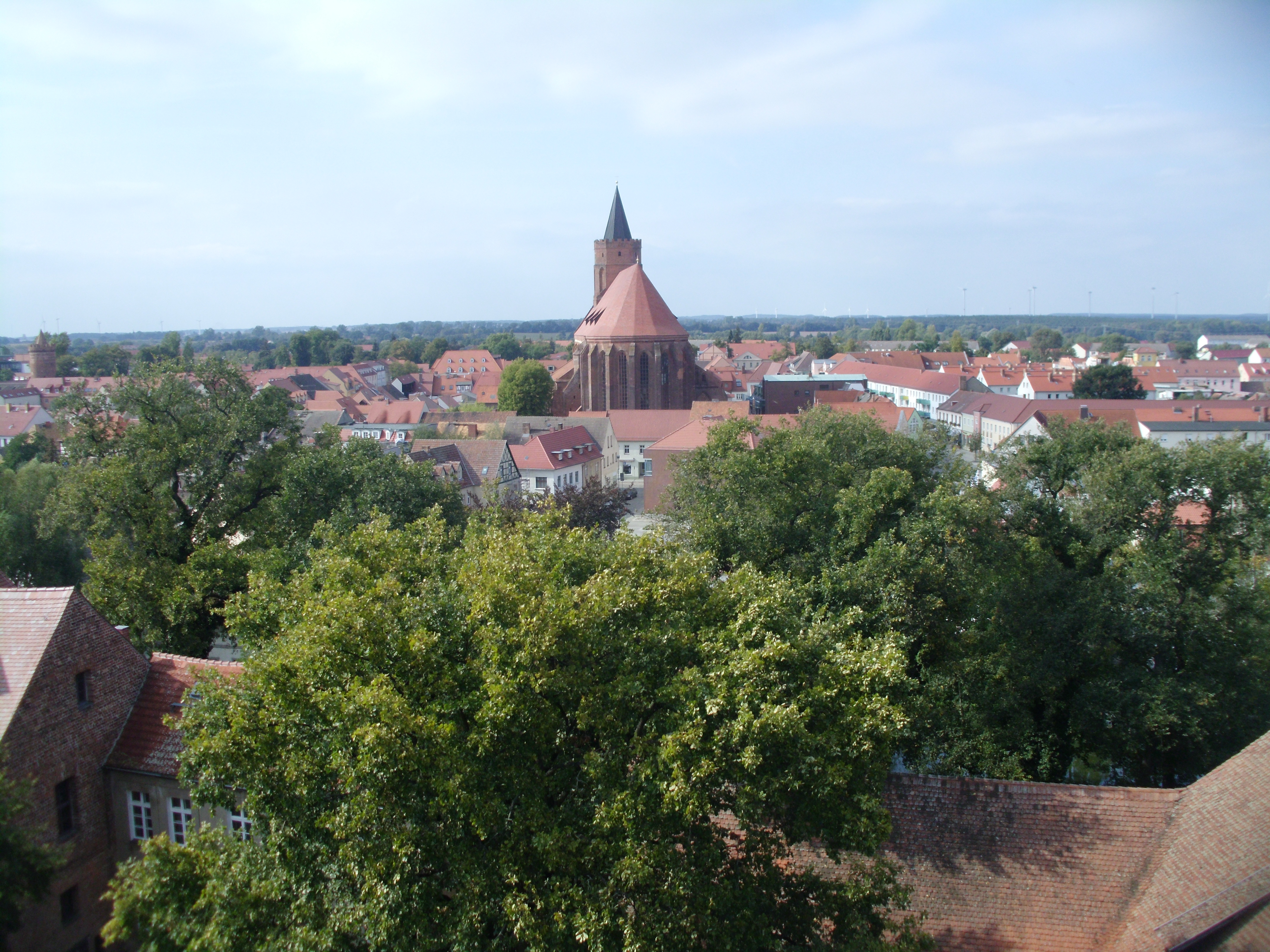
- View over Beeskow

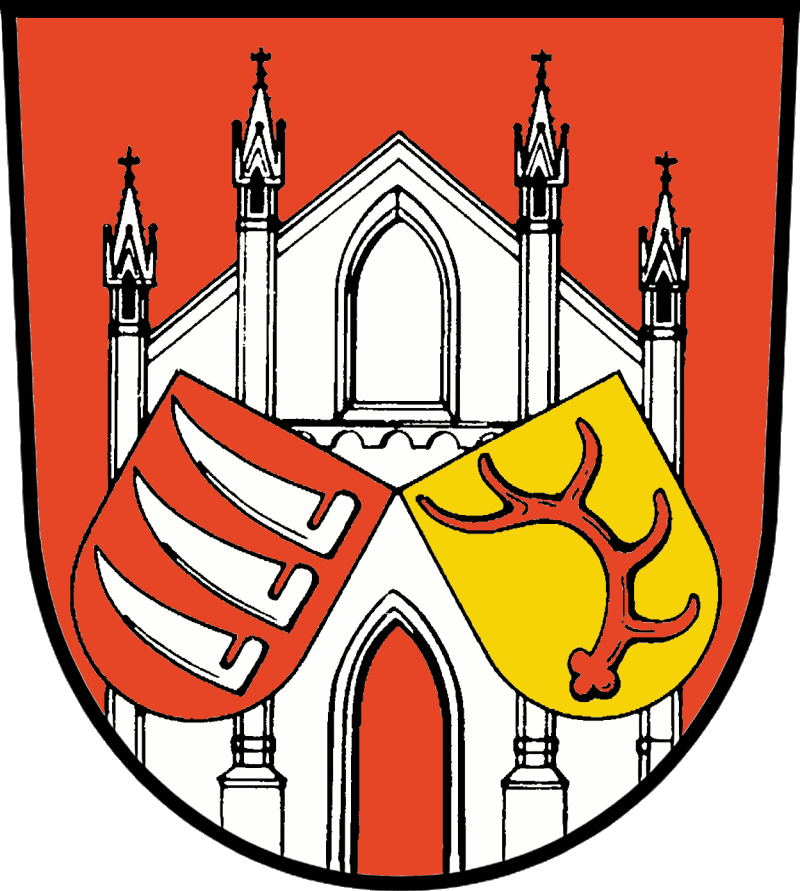
- Coat of arms

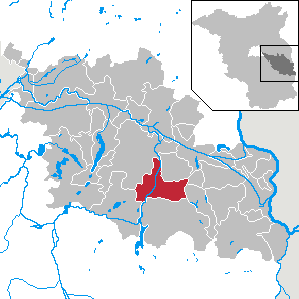
- Location of Beeskow within Oder-Spree district
- Interactive map of Beeskow
- Location within Germany Location within Brandenburg
- Coordinates: 52°10′N 14°15′E
- Country: Germany
- State: Brandenburg
- District: Oder-Spree
- Subdivisions: Kernstadt und 7 Ortsteile

Government
  - Mayor (2023–31): Robert Czaplinski (CDU)

Area
  - Total: 77.82 km^{2} (30.05 sq mi)
- Elevation: 40 m (130 ft)

Population (2025-12-31)
  - Total: 7,930
  - Density: 102/km^{2} (264/sq mi)
- Time zone: UTC+01:00 (CET)
  - Summer (DST): UTC+02:00 (CEST)
- Postal codes: 15848
- Dialling codes: 03366
- Vehicle registration: LOS
- Website: www.beeskow.de

Beeskow (German pronunciation: [ˈbeːskoː]; Lower Sorbian: Bezkow, pronounced [ˈbɛskɔw]) is a town in Brandenburg, in eastern Germany, and capital of the Oder-Spree district. It is situated on the river Spree, 30 km southwest of Frankfurt an der Oder.

== History ==
In 1518 the town was purchased by the Diocese of Lubusz, and it was the place of death of the last bishop in 1555. The town was a fief of the Kingdom of Bohemia until 1742, when it was annexed by the Kingdom of Prussia. From 1815 to 1947, it was part of the Province of Brandenburg. One of the main escape routes for insurgents of the unsuccessful Polish November Uprising from partitioned Poland to the Great Emigration led through the town. During World War I, a German prisoner-of-war camp for Allied officers was located in the town.

After World War II, Beeskow was incorporated into the State of Brandenburg from 1947 to 1952 and the Bezirk Frankfurt of East Germany from 1952 to 1990. Since 1990, Beeskow is again part of Brandenburg.

== Demography ==
Development of Population since 1875 within the Current Boundaries (Blue Line: Population; Dotted Line: Comparison to Population Development of Brandenburg state; Grey Background: Time of Nazi rule; Red Background: Time of Communist rule)

Recent Population Development and Projections (Population Development before Census 2011 (blue line); Recent Population Development according to the Census in Germany in 2011 (blue bordered line); Official projections for 2005-2030 (yellow line); for 2017-2030 (scarlet line); for 2020-2030 (green line)

Beeskow: Population development
within the current boundaries (2020)

Year	Pop.	±% p.a.
1875	6,668	—
1890	6,585	−0.08%
1910	6,408	−0.14%
1925	6,744	+0.34%
1939	7,128	+0.40%
1950	9,191	+2.34%
1964	8,667	−0.42%

Year	Pop.	±% p.a.
1971	8,774	+0.18%
1981	9,617	+0.92%
1985	9,749	+0.34%
1990	9,712	−0.08%
1995	9,403	−0.64%
2000	8,946	−0.99%
2005	8,432	−1.18%

Year	Pop.	±% p.a.
2010	8,120	−0.75%
2015	8,122	+0.00%
2016	8,099	−0.28%
2017	8,080	−0.23%
2018	8,042	−0.47%
2019	8,040	−0.02%
2020	8,070	+0.37%

== Personalities ==
=== Sons and daughters of the city ===
- Karl August Otto Hoffmann (1853–1909), botanist
- Max Seiffert (1868–1948), musicologist, editor of ancient music
- Hans Sohnle (1895–1976), art director
- Otto Holzapfel (born 1941), folklorist and researcher of traditional German folk song (folk music, Lied)
- Joachim Mattern (born 1948), canoeist
- Judith Zeidler (born 1967), rower
- Jana Thieme (born 1970), rower
- Ronny Ostwald (born 1974), sprint athlete
