= Dietrich von Bülow =

German bishop

The Most Reverend Dietrich von Bülow
- Bishop of Lebus
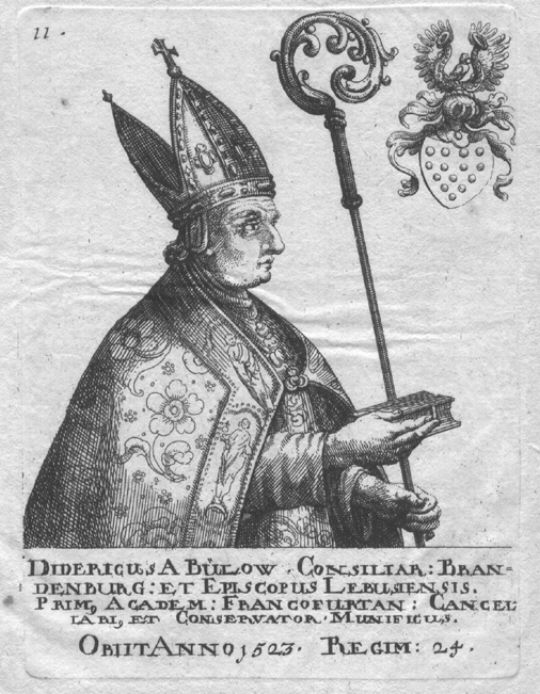
- Church: Roman Catholic
- Diocese: Diocese of Lebus
- In office: 1490–1523
- Predecessor: Ludwig von Burgsdorf
- Successor: Georg von Blumenthal

Orders
- Ordination: 1479

Personal details
- Born: 1460; Mecklenburg
- Died: 1 October 1523 (aged 62–63); Lebus
- Buried: St. Mary's Cathedral

Dietrich von Bülow (1460 – 1 October 1523) was a German Bishop of Lebus-Fürstenwalde.

== Biography ==
He was born the son of Friedrich von Bülow on Wehningen in Saxon-Lauenburg, who was a princely Brunswick and Mecklenburg councillor. His mother was Sophie von Quitzow. In 1472, he went to the University of Rostock and earned a bachelor's degree from the Faculty of Arts in 1477. There he also met his friend, who later became Bishop of Havelberg, Busso von Alvensleben. In order to study law, he enrolled in Erfurt in 1478 and in Bologna in 1479, where he received his doctorate in 1484, PhD in civil law. Since 1479, he was also as entered as a cleric in the Diocese of Verden an der Aller, in 1482 he became a canon in Lübeck.

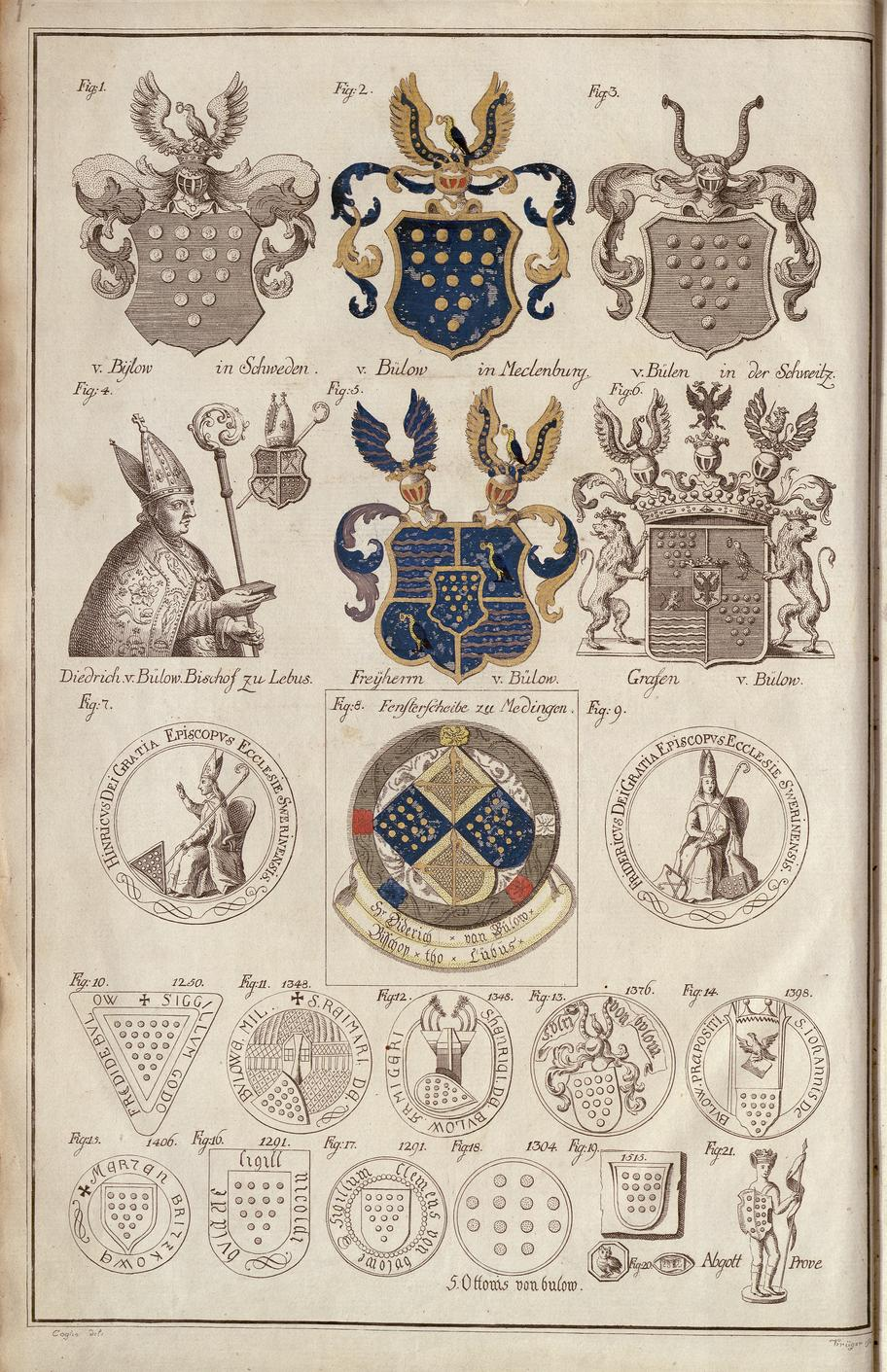
Coat of arms of Bishop Dietrich von Bülow (top center)

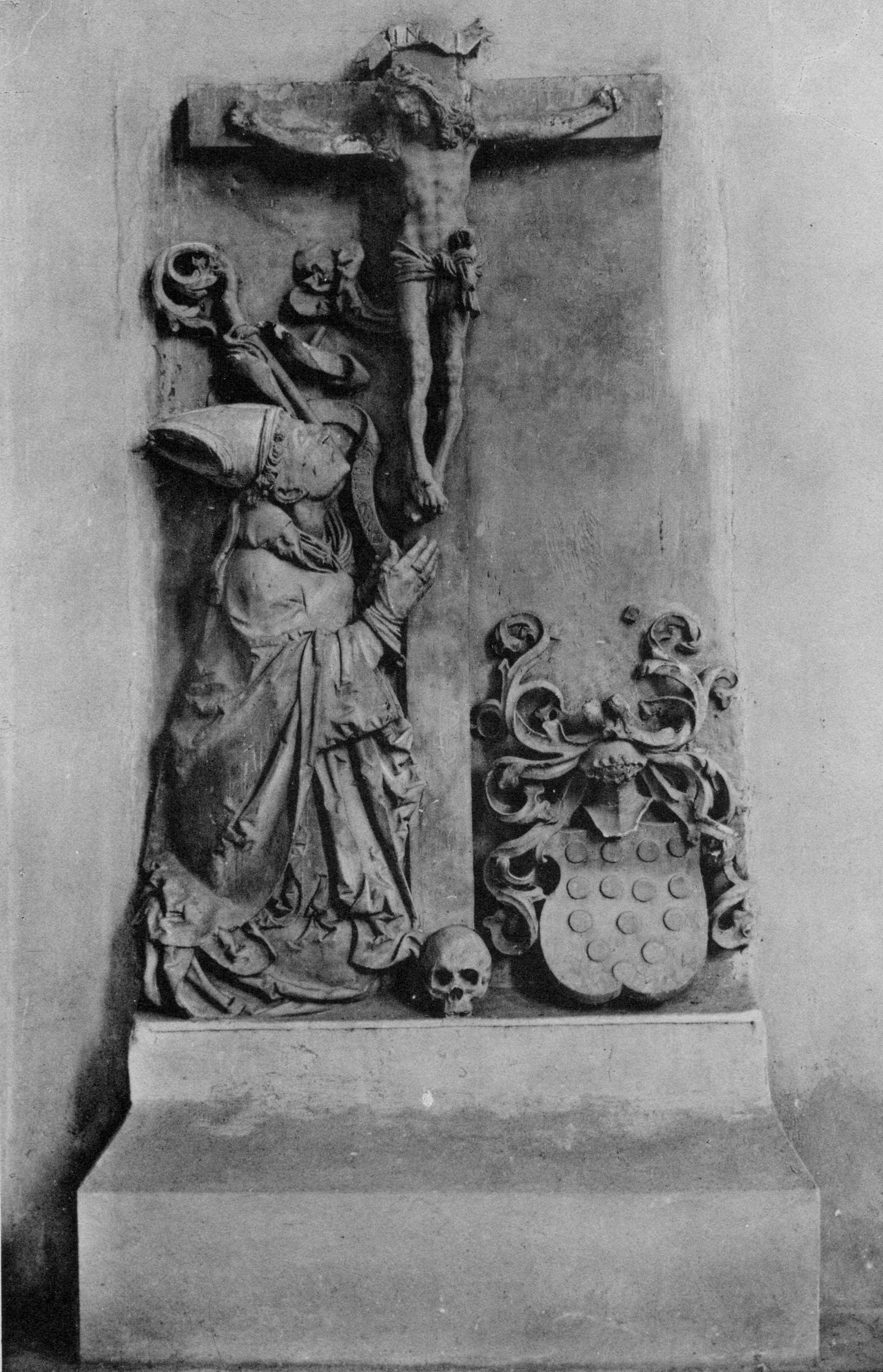
Epitaph in Fürstenwalde

Around 1487, he succeeded his friend Busso von Alvensleben as Electoral Brandenburg Councilor until the establishment of the Viadrina University in Frankfurt (Oder) in 1506, of which he became the first chancellor. On 20 October 1490, he was elected Bishop of Lebus in Fürstenwalde/Spree, confirmed by Pope Innocent VIII in February 1491. In 1491, he took part in the Diet of Nuremberg, in 1492 and 1493 in the negotiations in Königsberg/Neumark between the Brandenburg and Pomeranian councils. This is where the basis for inheritance settlement was laid, which was set out in the Treaty of Grimnitz (1529) which ceded the Duchy of Pomerania to Prussia. Grimnitz Castle was near Joachimsthal.

In 1494, he acted as an arbitrator between the Dukes of Brunswick-Lüneburg and the city of Brunswick. In 1497, he arbitrated disputes between Brandenburg and the Margraviate of Lusatia. In 1502, he had a decisive influence on the reform of the city constitution of Frankfurt (Oder) and in 1514, helped bring about the treaty between the Polish king Sigismund I and Elector Joachim I.

In 1518, he acquired the dominions of Beeskow and Storkow from the lords of Biberstein for the Diocese of Lebus. On 23 January 1503, he consecrated Johann Schlabrendorf bishop of the Diocese of Havelberg. On 14 May 1514, he consecrated Archbishop Albrecht of Mainz as bishop. Ulrich von Hutten dedicated the poem Klagen gegen Lötze to him.

His funeral took place in Fürstenwalde on the Spree. He found his final resting place in St. Mary's Cathedral, Fürstenwalde. The sandstone epitaph contains the inscription: "Sub hoc saxo latent sepulti sineres Reve[re]ndi in Christo Patris et Domini Theodorici de Bulco Episcopi Lubucensis, qui obiit prima Octobris anno salutis 1523, cuius anima requiescat in pace Amen." Buried under this stone are the bones of the reverend Father Christo and Herr Theodor von Bülow, Bishop of Lebus, who died on the first of October in the year of salvation 1523; his soul may rest in peace. Amen.

== Bust in the Siegesallee ==
For the Siegesallee in Berlin, the sculptor Johannes Götz designed a marble bust of Bülow as a side figure to the central statue of Elector Joachim I in memorial group 19, unveiled on 28 August 1900. The bust represents von Bülow as an older clergyman with delicate hands who holding an open book. The base of the bust is decorated with the family coat of arms and a laurel frieze. In the back of the bench, an allegorical figure of a boy refers to his role as the prince's tutor. The boy is reading a book, the attributes telescope and starry sky indicate the Elector's interest in astronomy. A relief on the other side of the bust refers to a praying child in front of you Portrait of Mary on von Bülow's resistance to the Reformation. Only the torso of the bust has survived and has been in the Spandau Citadel since May 2009; the head is missing.

== Literature ==
- From Lebus to Fürstenwalde. Brief History of the Medieval Diocese of Lebus (1124 - 1555/98). Heinz Teichmann, Leipzig 1991, ISBN 3-7462-0532-8
- Heinrich Grimm: Bülow, Dietrich von. In: New German Biography (NDB). Volume 2, Duncker & Humblot, Berlin 1955, ISBN 3-428-00183-4, p. 733 (digitized).
- Theodor Hirsch: Bülow, Dietrich von. In: General German Biography (ADB). Volume 5, Duncker & Humblot, Leipzig 1877, p. 182 f.
- Hartmut Krohm, Alexander Bindr: The Sacrament House in St. Mary's Cathedral in Fürstenwalde. Findling, Neuenhagen 2003. ISBN 3-933603-13-7

Catholic Church titles
Preceded by Ludwig von Burgsdorf	Bishop of Lebus; 1490–1523	Succeeded by Georg von Blumenthal
