= Wawrzyniec (bishop of Lubusz) =

Polish bishop

Wawrzyniec (German: Lorenz, Latin: Laurentius) was a bishop of Lubusz until his death on 9 March 1233.

Between 1204 and 1209 he became a bishop of Lubusz. He took a participation in synod in Borzykowo (1210) and in synod in Mostowo (1212).

Wawrzyniec died on 9 March 1233.

According to the tradition from 17th Century they were two bishops named Wawrzyniec (first died in 1204, second in 1232), but it is rejected by modern historians, which claim that there was only one bishop of Lubusz named Wawrzyniec.
