= Górzyca, Lubusz Voivodeship =

Górzyca
- Village
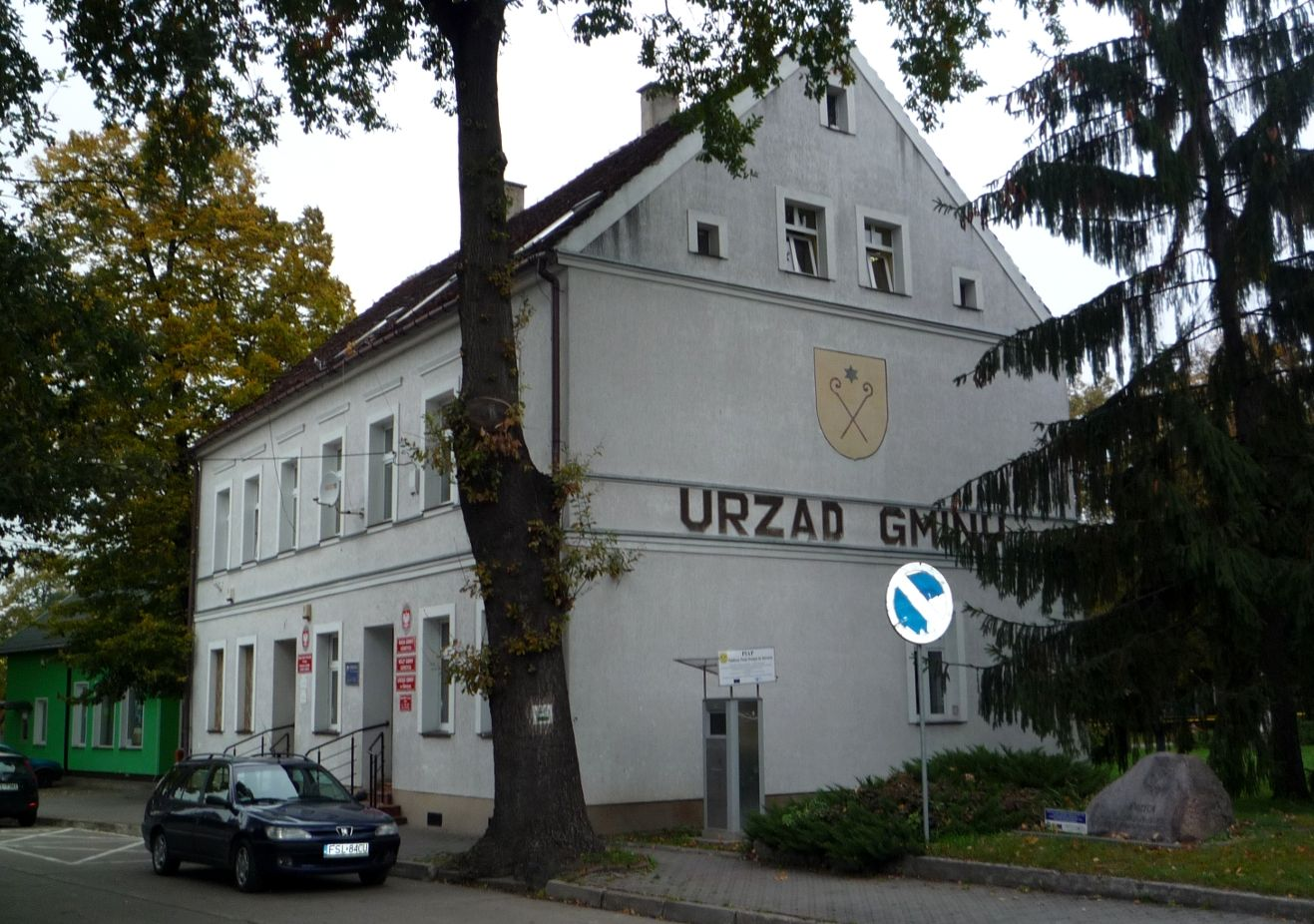
- Gmina Górzyca administration building

- Location within Poland
- Coordinates: 52°29′41″N 14°39′18″E
- Country: Poland
- Voivodeship: Lubusz
- County: Słubice
- Gmina: Górzyca

Population
  - Total: 2,000

Górzyca [ɡuˈʐɨt͡sa] (German: Göritz (Oder)) is a village on the Oder river in Słubice County, Lubusz Voivodeship, in western Poland, close to the German border at Reitwein. It is the seat of the gmina (administrative district) called Gmina Górzyca.

== History ==
The settlement in Lubusz Land was first mentioned in a 1252 deed and in 1276 became the episcopal see of the Bishops of Lebus, who had fled from the Ascanian margraves of Brandenburg, and the site of a sanctuary of Blessed Virgin Mary. Upon the extinction of the Ascanian dynasty, the Wittelsbach margrave Louis I of Brandenburg during his fight against King Władysław I the Elbow-high of Poland in 1325 had the church and town destroyed. The local episcopal see was officially abolished in 1346 and later relocated to the Fürstenwalde Cathedral.

Then part of the Brandenburgian Neumark region, the sanctuary remained a pilgrimage site until the Protestant margrave John of Brandenburg-Küstrin had the relic removed and the chapel was demolished by the citizens of nearby Drossen. Destroyed by a blaze in 1757, Göritz and its church were rebuilt by the Prussian authorities; it received town privileges in 1808. Already in June 1945, the entire populace was deported from their home for new Polish settlers to take their place.
