= Samuel Rüling =

German composer and poet

Samuel Rüling (also Rühling, Rhuling, Rülich) (1586 – June 1626) was a German composer and poet in the early 17th century.

== Before Kreuzkirche ==
Rüling was born around 1586 in Groitzsch, near Leipzig, as the son of Johann (also Johannes, Hans) Rüling. His father (1550–1615) served as organist in Zeithain from 1572 to 1575, then in Döbeln until 1582, and finally until his death in Groitzsch, where he was also town clerk. Johann Rüling also published the Tabulaturbuch auff Orgeln und Instrument in 1583, and consequently his considerable musical accomplishments make it likely that Samuel received an extensive musical education early on. Samuel Rüling entered the Fürstenschule at Grimma on 20 June 1601, and left it on 4 July 1606. His instructors in Grimma were primarily the rector Martin Hayneccius and cantor Fridericus Birck.

He matriculated at the University of Leipzig in the same summer semester, where he studied with Ambrosius Sonewaldt, and later with Mühlmann, Harbart and Corvinus. He must also have been in close proximity with the prominent Thomaskantor Sethus Calvisius. Around 1610, he became cantor at the university church Paulinerkirche, which was famous for its substantial musical performances at both religious and academic events. No later than 1611, he became a royally crowned poet.

== Kreuzkirche Period ==
Because of various problems with Rüling's predecessors at the Kreuzkirche, the Dresden city council was particularly careful in filling the position, and assigned the main scribe M. Schobert to find a suitable student at the Leipzig University. Schobert wrote to the professor Johann Friedrich on 25 July 1612, explaining the vacancy and the desired qualifications. Friedrich recommended Rüling because of his academic and musical excellence, and he was appointed Kreuzkantor on 17 September 1612. Some sources claim that he married Maria Brehme in the Thomaskirche in Leipzig on 29 November 1612.

Though Rüling seems to have been satisfied with his position at the Kreuzkirche, he actively pursued a promotion to a clerical position, and when an opening appeared at the Kreuzkirche in 1612, he applied for it. Though he did not receive the promotion, the council sent him a letter lauding his qualifications, and Rüling wrote back asking to be considered in the future.

In 1615 he compiled the first extensive Kreuzkirche inventory, dated 26 June, which showed substantial additions since the original 1575 inventory. The acquisitions, likely made during his and Christoph Lisberger's tenure (1606–1612), span the various 15th and 16th century European styles, and point to an interest and ability in performing them with the Kreuzchor. The entire contents of the inventory perished no later than the 1760 fire.

== After Kreuzkirche ==
On 1 September 1615, Rüling was invited to another meeting with the city council about a deacon position, and received the post on 16 September. He was assigned to the central Frauenkirche parish, to which Heinrich Schütz and his wife notably belonged. From 1615 until his death in June 1626, Rüling was able to publish a variety of sermons and poems, many of which can still be found in the Dresden archives. A number of his poems also appeared preceding Schütz's compositions. In 1625 he attended Schütz's wife at her deathbed. His connection with Schütz's wife, her father, and Schütz himself points towards a close relationship between the two, and this is further supported by his composition Machet die Tore weit, which has been misattributed to Schütz in the past, and the beginning of which seems to have been edited by Schütz himself.

Rüling died in June 1626. In many ways, he was the first significant post-Reformation Kreuzkantor, since his 6-9 voice compositions, though never appearing in print, managed to find their way into many regional archives over the course of the 17th century. As late as 1730, he was mentioned by M. Sivers as a "well-versed cantor".

== Compositions ==
Current locations of sources in parentheses.

- Der Herr erhöre dich in der Not - 8 voices, 6 extant (Mügeln)
- Ein Tag in deinen Vorhöfen - 8 voices & basso continuo (Budapest, Dresden, Kraków, Levoča, Mügeln, Neustadt an der Orla, Wolfenbüttel) - also attributed to Heinrich Grimm
- Erstanden ist der heilige Christ - 8 voices (Dresden)
- Gaudeat adjuncta sponsa - 7 voices, 2 extant (Dresden, Wolfenbüttel)
- Habe deine Lust an dem Herren - 8 voices & organ tabulature (Berlin, Dresden, Mügeln, Zwickau)
- Ich hab' den Herrn allzeit für Augen - 8 voices (Dresden, Mügeln, Wolfenbüttel, Zwickau) - also attributed to Heinrich Grimm
- Machet die Tore weit - 8 voices, basso continuo & organ tabulature (Dresden, Levoča, Wrocław - also attributed to Heinrich Schütz
- Mein Freund komme in seinen Garten - 8 voices (Budapest, Dresden, Neustadt an der Orla, Waldheim, Warsaw, Wolfenbüttel, Wrocław, Zwickau) - also attributed to Melchior Franck
- Nunc gaudere decet - 8 voices & organ tabulature, only organ tabulature extant (Berlin)
- Schaff in mir Gott ein reines Herze - 8 voices, at least 6 extant (Dresden, Mügeln, Wolfenbüttel)
- Sic Deus dilexit mundum - 6 voices, 4 extant (Dresden, Wolfenbüttel)
- Stehe auf meine Freundin - 8 voices, at least 6 extant (Dresden, Kraków, Wolfenbüttel)
- Was betrübst du dich, meine Seele - 8 voices (Dresden, Mügeln, Weimar, Wolfenbüttel, Zwickau)
- Gott ist in Juda bekannt - 9 voices (lost, last mentioned 1894 - Karl Held)
- Homo quidam erat dives 7 voices (lost, last mentioned before 1894 - Otto Kade)

== Writings ==
- Novus Elector Dei gratia Serenissimus Et Potentissimus Princeps Ac Dominus, Dominus Johannes Georgius Dux Saxoniae, Iuliae, Cleviae Et Montium: S.R. Imperii Archimarschallus ... : Lipsiam 17. September. An. 1611. solenniter ingressus humilime salutatur
- Hiskias Querulus, Das ist: Klagrede des krancken Königes Hiskiae, Bey dem Begrebnüß des Weyland Ehrnvesten, Manhafften und Kunstreichen Herrn Michaelis Lehmanni, gewesenen FeldTrommeters, [et]c. : Welcher am Sontage Sexagesimae, war der 8. Februarij, Anno 1618. ... entschlaffen, und folgends den 11. ... in sein Ruhebettlein ist versetzt worden
- Epigram to Psalmen Davids by Heinrich Schütz
- Christliche Leichpredigt, Bey dem Volckreichen Begräbnüß, Des ... H. Gabriel Voigts, Churf. S. Secretarii, und geheimbden RentCammer Verwandtens : Welcher den 9. Septembris, Anno 1622. zu Dreßden, in Christo selig eingeschlaffen, vud den 12. hernach in sein Ruhebettlein ist versetzt worden
- “Lessus Christianus” d. i. Leichten Predigten in und außer der Festung Dresden gehalten
- Die edle Sterbekunst Simeonis, Bey dem Leichbegängnüs Der... Frawen Annen, Des ... Matthes Kaphans, gewesenen Bürgers und Büttners zu Dreßden ... Wittwen : Welche am Tage Mariae Reinigung, Anno 1622. im 90. Jahr ihres Alters, seliglich von dieser Welt abgeschieden, und den 6. Februarii hernach Christlich zur Erden ist bestattet worden
- Succus propheticus, d. i. XXV außerlesene Kernsprüche aus den Propheten in ... Predigten erklärt
- Epigram to Schütz's Cantiones sacrae
- Sechs christliche hohe Festags Predigten, auff Weynachten, Ostern und Pfingsten, gehalten in der Creutzkirchen zu Dreszden, und vielen frommen Christen zu Trost in Druck gegeben

== Sources ==
- Garbe, Daniela. Das Musikalienrepertoire von St. Stephani zu Helmstedt: Ein Bestand an Drucken und Handschriften des 17. Jahrhunderts. Wiesbaden: Harrassowitz Verlag, 1998.
- Härtwig, D., Herrmann, M. Der Dresdner Kreuzchor: Geschichte und Gegenwart, Wirkungsstätten und Schule. Leipzig: Evangelische Verlagsanstalt, 2006.
- Held, Karl. Das Kreuzkantorat zu Dresden. Leipzig: Breitkopf & Härtel, 1894.
- Moser, Hans Joachim. Heinrich Schütz: His Life and Work. Saint Louis: Concordia Publishing House, 1959.
- Steude, Wolfram: Annäherung durch Distanz: Texte zur älteren mitteldeutschen Musik und Musikgeschichte. Altenburg: Klaus-Jürgen Kamprad publishing house, 2001.
- Steude, Wolfram. Bemerkungen zu “Machet die Tore weit” (SWV Anhang 8). 10. Jahrgang 1988, pp. 50–61.
- Steude, Wolfram. Die Musiksammelhandschriften des 16. und 17. Jahrhunderts in der Sächsischen Landesbibliothek zu Dresden. Wilhelmshaven: Heinrichshofen's Verlag, 1974.
- Steude, Wolfram. Samuel Rüling und Heinrich Schütz: Machet die Tore weit, SWV Anhang 8. Stuttgart: Carus-Verlag, 1992.
