= Johannes Götz =

German sculptor (1865–1934)

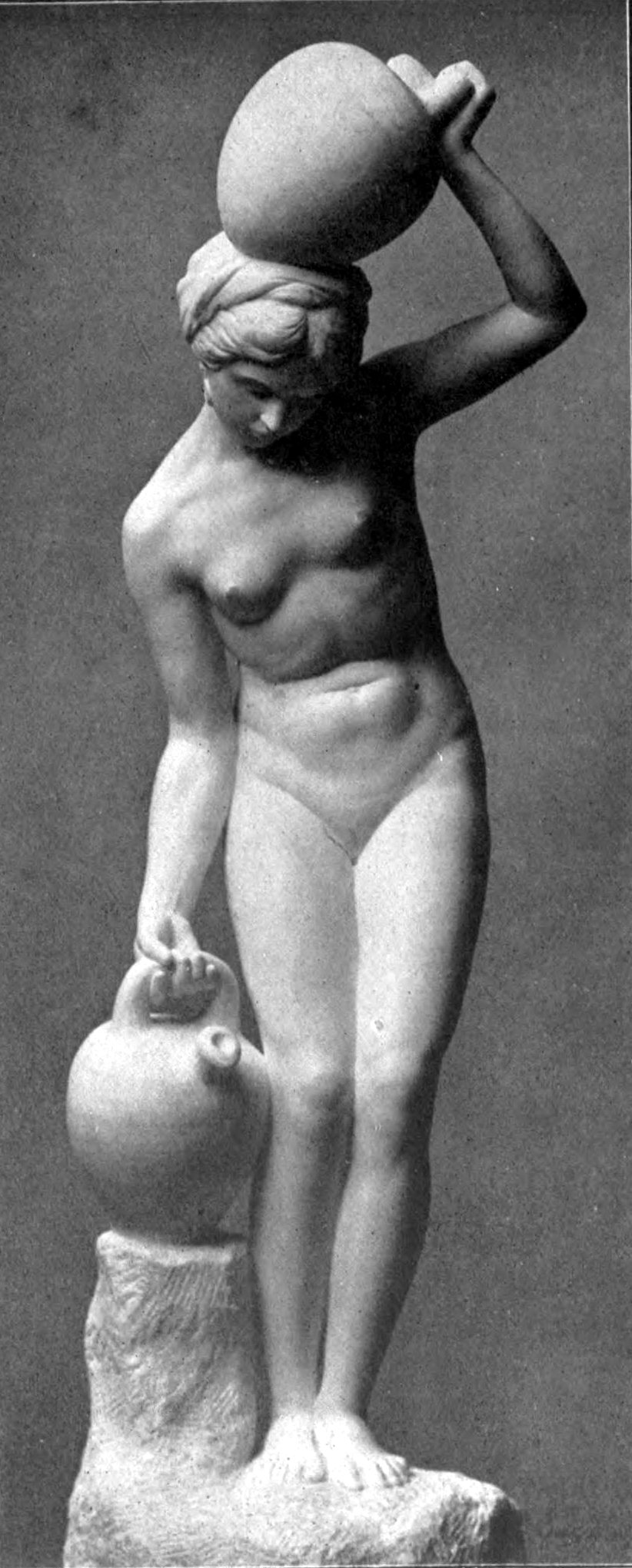
The Watercarrier (1891)

Johannes Gottfried Götz (4 October 1865 in Fürth – 11 September 1934 in Potsdam) was a German sculptor.

== Life ==
He was the son of a carpenter. After attending the Academy of Fine Arts, Nuremberg, in 1884 he went to Berlin to study sculpture with Reinhold Begas at the Prussian Academy of Arts up until 1890. His figure of a nude female water carrier won the Academy's "Prix-de-Rome", which enabled him to study there for two years. He later became a Professor at the Academy in Nuremberg.

His work gained the attention of Kaiser Wilhelm II, who chose him to produce a group of figures for the Kaiser's monumental Siegesallee (Victory Avenue) project. Later, in 1909, at the Kaiser's request, he produced a gigantic statue of Achilles in a victorious stance for the Achilleion, a palace on Corfu built by Elisabeth of Bavaria. The statue was meant to offset an earlier work by Ernst Herter called the "Dying Achilles".

He lived in Fürth for most of his life and many of his works are located there, including grave and tomb decorations for thirteen of the city's notable families. His own parents' grave is adorned with a figure called "The Weary Wanderer". Götz himself is, however, buried in Potsdam. In 1952, a street was named after him in the Dambach district of Fürth.

== Selected works ==
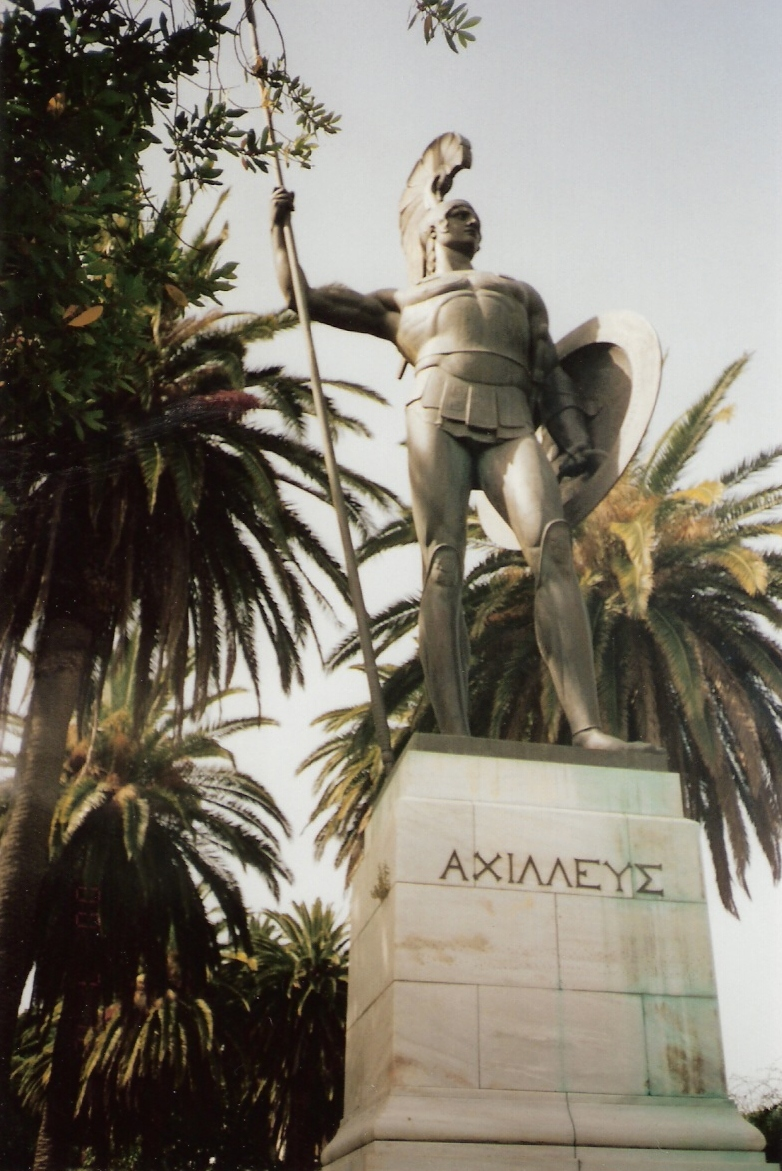
Kämpfender Achilles ("Achilles Victorious", lit. "Battles-Over Achilles", 1909)

Berlin

- Quadriga on the National Kaiser Wilhelm Monument
- Siegesallee Group 19: consisting of Joachim I Nestor, Elector of Brandenburg as the central figure, flanked by Albert of Mainz (his younger brother) and Dietrich von Bülow (?-1523), Bishop of Lebus

Fürth

- "Jugendbrunnen" (Youth Fountain) in front of the fire station.
- Busts of Wilhelm Löhe and other notables from Fürth in the Kirchenplatz

Other

- Statues of Antoninus Pius and Theodor Mommsen at Saalburg Castle, near Bad Homburg.
- Hermann Wissmann Monument in Bad Lauterberg
- Monuments to Queen Louise and Johannes Gutenberg in Magdeburg
