= Georg von Blumenthal =

German Prince-Bishop of Ratzeburg and Bishop of Lebus

The Most Reverend Georg von Blumenthal
- Bishop of Lebus
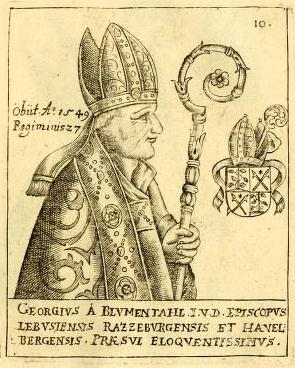
- Church: Roman Catholic
- Diocese: Diocese of Lebus
- In office: 1524–1550
- Predecessor: Dietrich von Bülow
- Successor: John VIII Horneburg
- Other post: Prince-Bishop of Ratzeburg (1525–1550)

Personal details
- Born: 1490 Horst, modern Heiligengrabe
- Died: 25 September 1550 (aged 59–60) Lebus
- Buried: St. Mary's Cathedral

Georg von Blumenthal (1490 – 25 September 1550) was a German Prince-Bishop of Ratzeburg and Bishop of Lebus. He also served as a Privy Councillor of the Margraviate of Brandenburg and Chancellor of the University of Frankfurt (Oder), commonly called the Viadrina.

== Biography ==
Bishop von Blumenthal was born at Horst, administratively now part of Heiligengrabe. He came from the Prignitz landed gentry and was a member of the von Blumenthal noble family in Brandenburg. His father Hans von Blumenthal († 1524) owned the Horst manor and villages of Vehlow, Blumenthal, Brüsenhagen, and a share of Rosenwinkel.

Blumenthal is mentioned as early as 1507 as secretary to Bishop Dietrich von Bülow. In 1513, as cathedral dean of Lebus, he also became rector of the Brandenburg University in Frankfurt and later received his Dr. iur. utr. PhD. In 1520, he received a position as canon at Ratzeburg Cathedral. In the same year, he was elected Bishop of Havelberg and also confirmed by the Pope, but could not accept the election because of the objection of the Elector of Brandenburg. From 1521 he was (with an interruption from 1526 to 1529) as the holder of a Great Prebendary also canon in Lübeck. In 1524, he became Bishop of Lebus and shortly afterwards Bishop of Ratzeburg as successor to Heinrich Bergmeier – against the bitter resistance of Duke Magnus I of Lauenburg.

He stayed mostly in the Diocese of Lebus and was represented in Ratzeburg by the cathedral provost. In 1528, he became involved in a feud with aristocrats from the Brandenburg region and narrowly escaped an attack on the episcopal palace in Fürstenwalde. In 1529, however, he came to Ratzeburg and had the reformist-minded preacher Thomas Aderpul imprisoned, which led to a feud with the nobles of the Klützer Winkel and to a lengthy Imperial Chamber Court process, which only ended in 1540 with a verdict in favor of the bishop.

In 1530, he accompanied Elector Joachim I to the Augsburg Diet. Here he obtained an imperial ban against Duke Magnus I for the robbery of church property and in 1536 he also won an imperial chamber trial against him. To finance the processes, the bishop and the Ratzeburg cathedral chapter had to sell the cathedral treasure from 1530 onwards.

He negotiated the second marriage of Joachim II, Elector of Brandenburg, to the Catholic Hedwig of Poland. Known in his lifetime as the "Pillar of Catholicism", he used his position as Chancellor of the Viadrina to combat the Reformation. He acquired the respect of his opponents, including the Margrave Joachim II himself, for his principled stand against reforms which he believed to be wrong and opposed by every legal means possible. For this, David Erdmann said he was "hostile to the gospel".

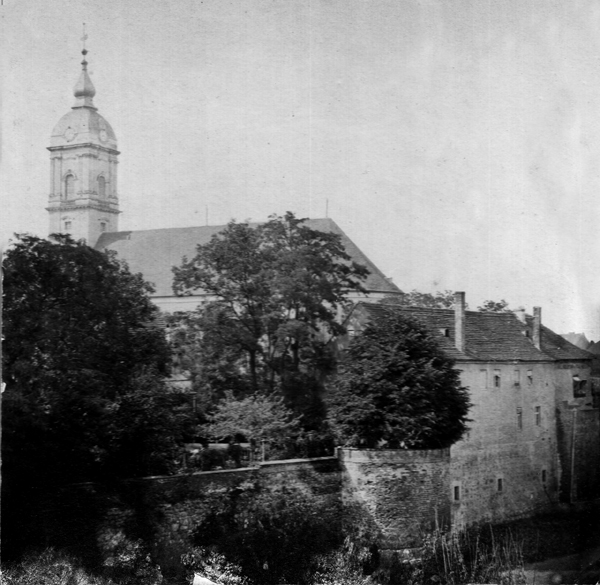
The Episcopal Palace of Georg von Blumenthal at Fürstenwalde, from a photo taken in the 1880s. Georg escaped through one of the windows

However, some of his opponents were not so respectful. He was twice besieged in his palaces by Protestant brigands; once at Fürstenwalde by the robber-baron Nickel von Minkwitz, an event which drew Martin Luther into the controversy, and once at Ratzeburg. At Fürstenwalde the Bishop escaped through a window in disguise, while his brother Matthias held the place. As Prince-Bishop of Ratzeburg he was the last Catholic sovereign ruler in northern Germany, and as Bishop of Lebus, the only Bishop in Brandenburg during the Protestant Reformation to die a Catholic. He died in Lebus and was buried in St Mary's Cathedral, Fürstenwalde upon Spree.

== Literature ==
- George Gottfried Küster (ed.): Martin Friedrich Seidel's picture collection. Berlin 1751, p. 23 ff. (digitized in the Google book search; with CVs and portraits of the Bishops of Havelberg).
- Gottlieb Matthias Carl Masch: History of the Bishopric of Ratzeburg. F. Aschenfeldt, Lübeck 1835, pp. 455–494 (full text in Google book search).
- Karl Schmaltz: Church history of Mecklenburg. Volume Two: Reformation and Counter-Reformation. Friedrich Bahn, Schwerin 1936, p. 37 f.
- Bernhard Stasiewski: Georg von Blumenthal. In: New German Biography (NDB). Volume 6, Duncker & Humblot, Berlin 1964, ISBN 3-428-00187-7, p. 224 (digitized).
- Reno Stutz: Ratzeburger Land. Neuer Hochschulschriften Verlag, Rostock 1996, ISBN 3-929544-37-7, pp. 101-104.

Georg von Blumenthal von Blumenthal Born: 1490 in Horst in the Prignitz Died: 24 or 25 September 1550 in Lebus
Catholic Church titles
Regnal titles
Preceded by Dietrich von Bülow	Bishop of Lebus; 1524–1550	Succeeded by John VIII Horneburg as Lutheran bishop
Preceded by Henry III Bergmeier	Prince-Bishop of Ratzeburg; 1525–1550	Succeeded by Christopher I von der Schulenburg as Lutheran bishop
