= St. Mary's Cathedral, Fürstenwalde =

Fürstenwalde Cathedral
- St. Mary's Cathedral
- Dom St. Marien; Dom zu Fürstenwalde
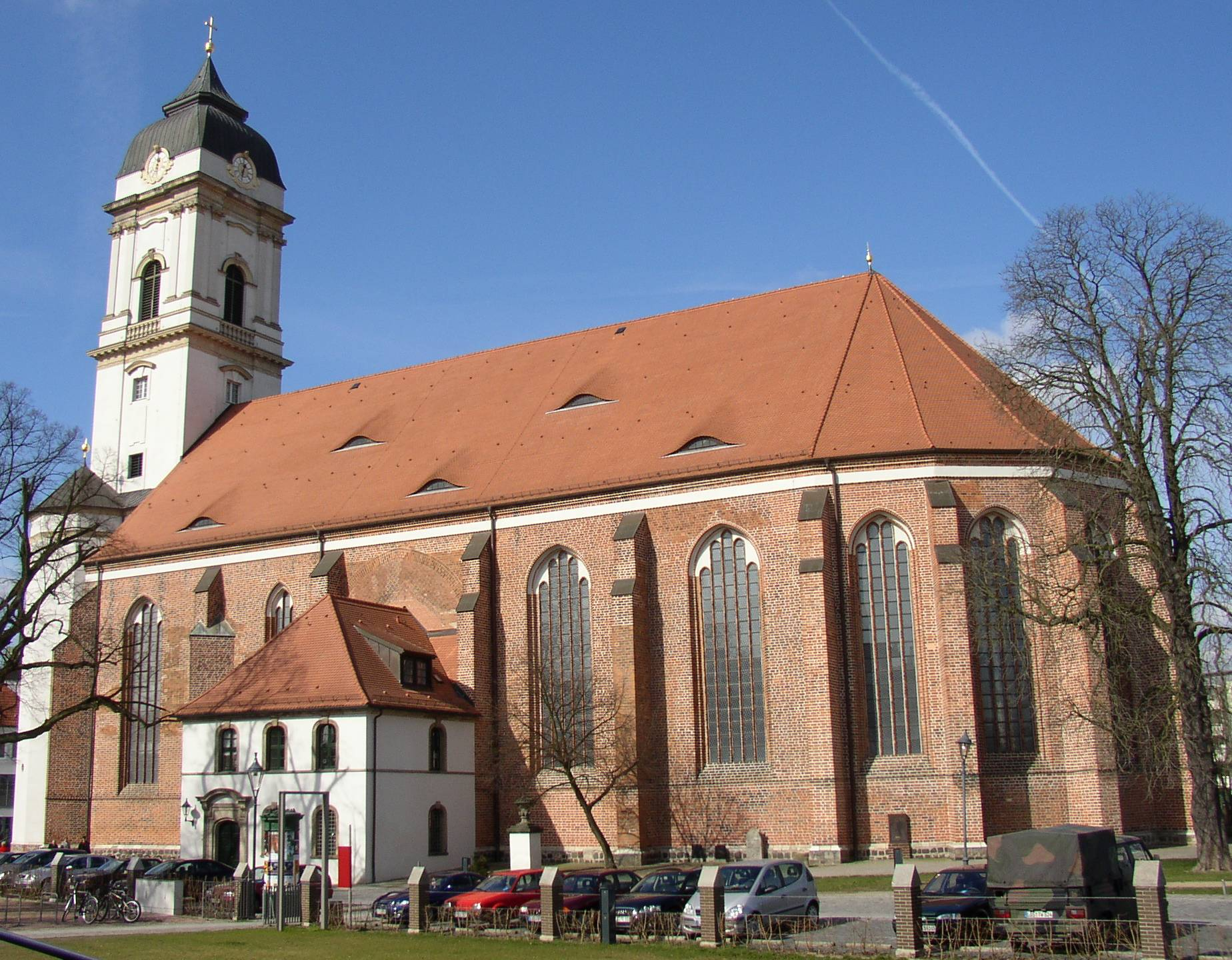
- St. Mary's Cathedral, seen from south

- Location within Brandenburg Location within Germany
- 52°21′29″N 14°03′55″E
- Location: Fürstenwalde upon Spree
- Country: Germany
- Denomination: United Protestant
- Previous denomination: Lutheran before 1817; Roman Catholic before 11 April 1557
- Website: Website (in German)

History
- Former name(s): Town Church of St. Mary's; Stadtkirche Sankt Marien
- Status: proto-cathedral
- Dedicated: 31 October 1995 (reconstr.)
- Consecrated: 1470 (2nd bldg)

Architecture
- Functional status: parish church
- Style: Gothic architecture
- Groundbreaking: 12 April 1446 (2nd bldg)
- Completed: 1230 (1st bldg); 1475 (2nd bldg)
- Demolished: 1432 (1st bldg); 16-18 April 1945 (2nd bldg)

Specifications
- Materials: brick

Administration
- Deanery: Fürstenwalde-Strausberg
- Parish: St. Marien-Domgemeinde

Clergy
- Dean: Superintendent Frank Schürer-Behrmann
- Pastor: Jörg Hemmerling

St. Mary's Cathedral is a United Protestant church in the town of Fürstenwalde upon Spree, Brandenburg, Germany. It was formerly the cathedral of the Bishopric of Lebus, which was a Catholic diocese before the Protestant Reformation.

The building is owned and used by the United Protestant St. Mary's Cathedral Congregation which forms a parish within the Evangelical Church of Berlin-Brandenburg-Silesian Upper Lusatia, an umbrella comprising mostly Lutheran, but also Calvinist and united Protestant congregations.

== History ==
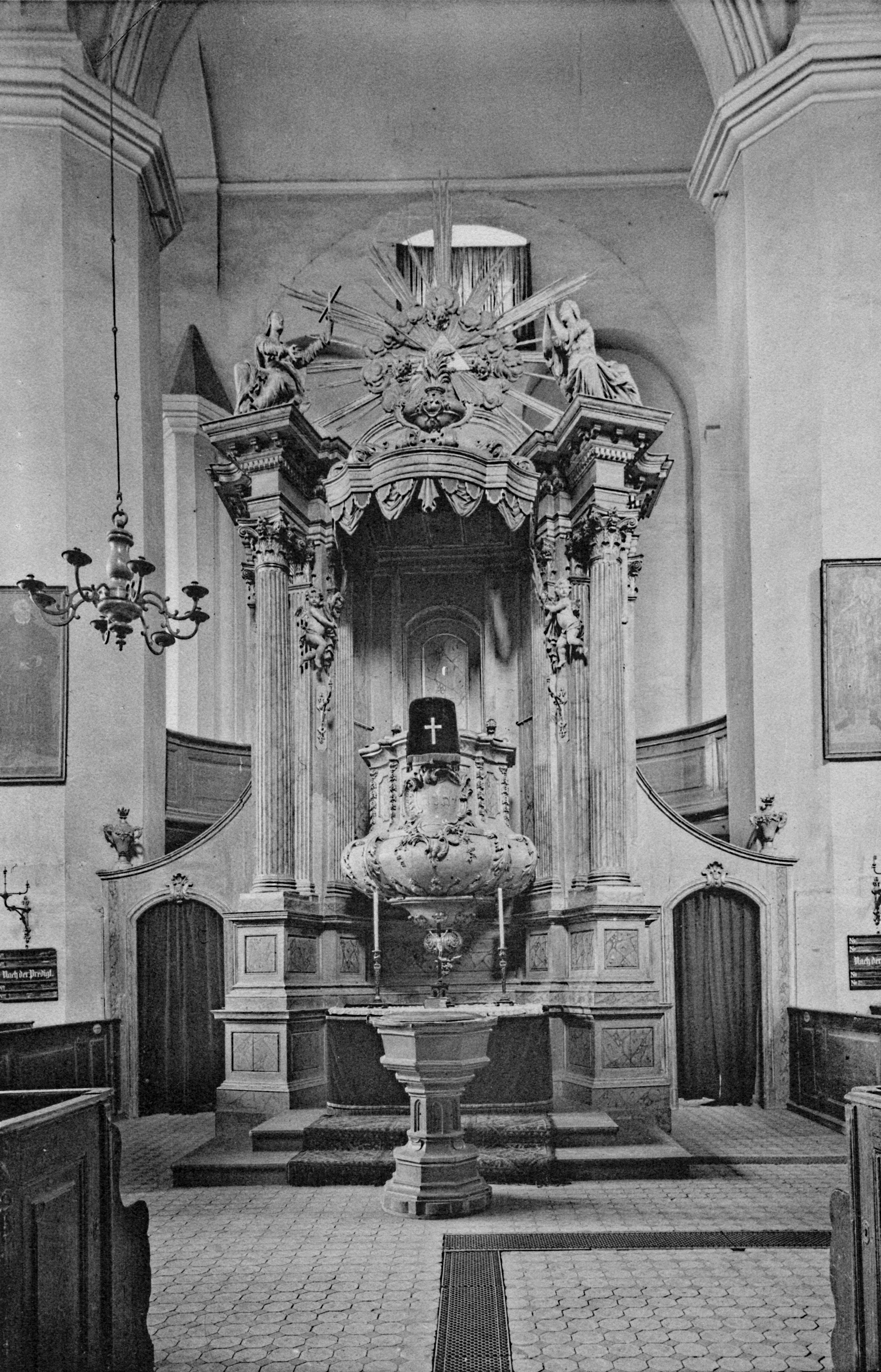
The cathedral's original pulpit altar, photo from 1909

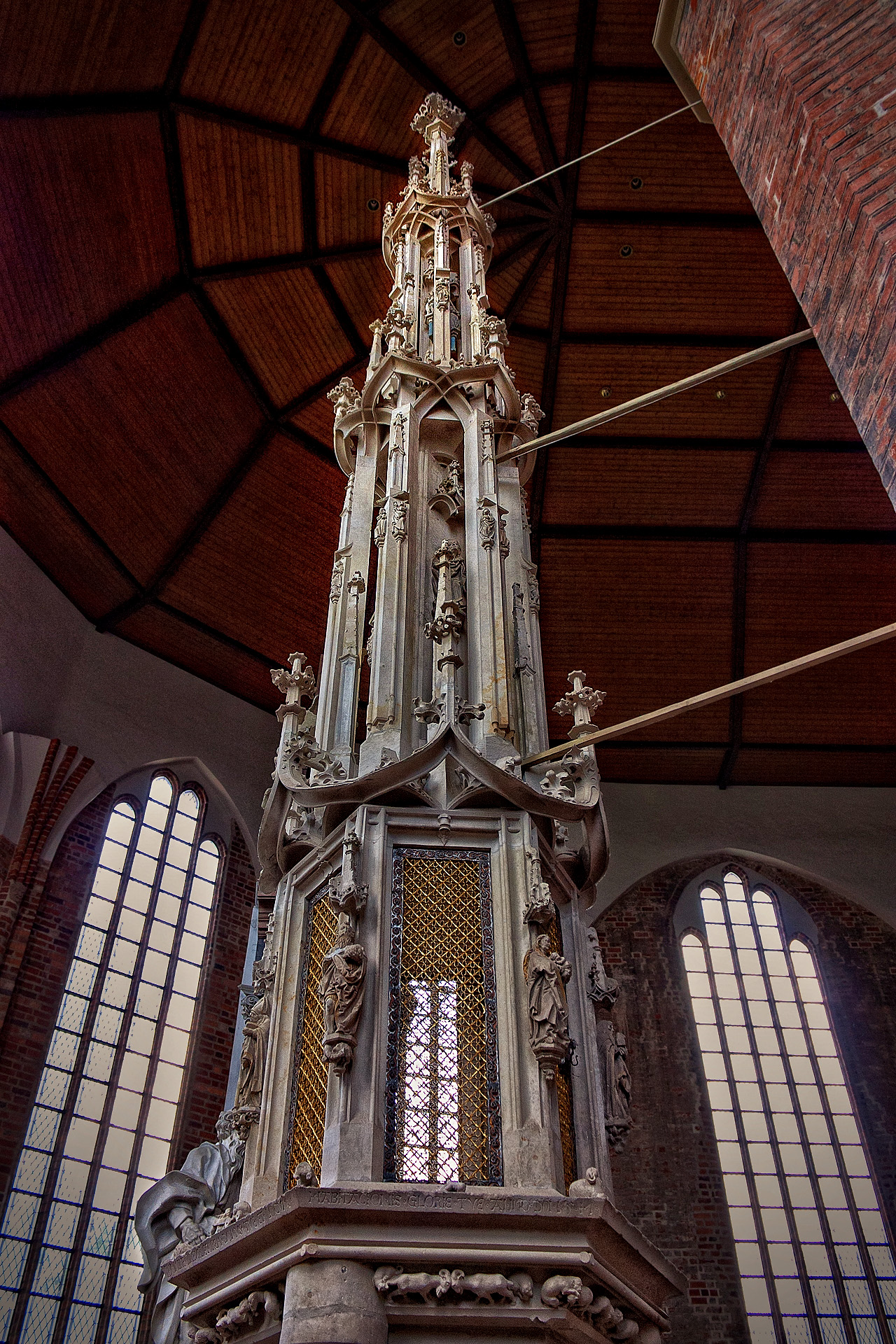
Sacrament house from the turn of the 14th to 15th c.

In 1373 Fürstenwalde upon Spree became the new seat of the cathedral of the see of Lebus, one of the three medieval dioceses of the March of Brandenburg. The cathedral, which is dedicated to Our Lady, was raised to cathedral of the diocese. In 1446, the cathedral was ransacked by Hussites. The attack was aimed at bishop John V of Lebus, a strong critic of Jan Hus. After the Hussites laid the cathedral to waste, work began on building it anew.

In 1517, bishop Dietrich von Bülow commissioned the sculptor Franz Maidburg to build a sacrament house (Sakramentshaus), a type of freestanding tabernacle that emerged from the German Gothic architecture of the late 14th to early 15th century. This part of the cathedral's history is controversial, as some believe that Maidburg did not work on this cathedral.

The cathedral weathered another attack during World War II, when it was almost completely destroyed. However, the church was not left completely at the mercy of the War's bombing. Foresight and precaution had prevailed, and the sacrament house and numerous grave-slabs had been walled in to protect them in 1942. This precautionary measure saved these structures from facing the same fate as the main church. The sacrament house and the grave-slabs thus protected survive to this day.

== Post-war reconstruction ==
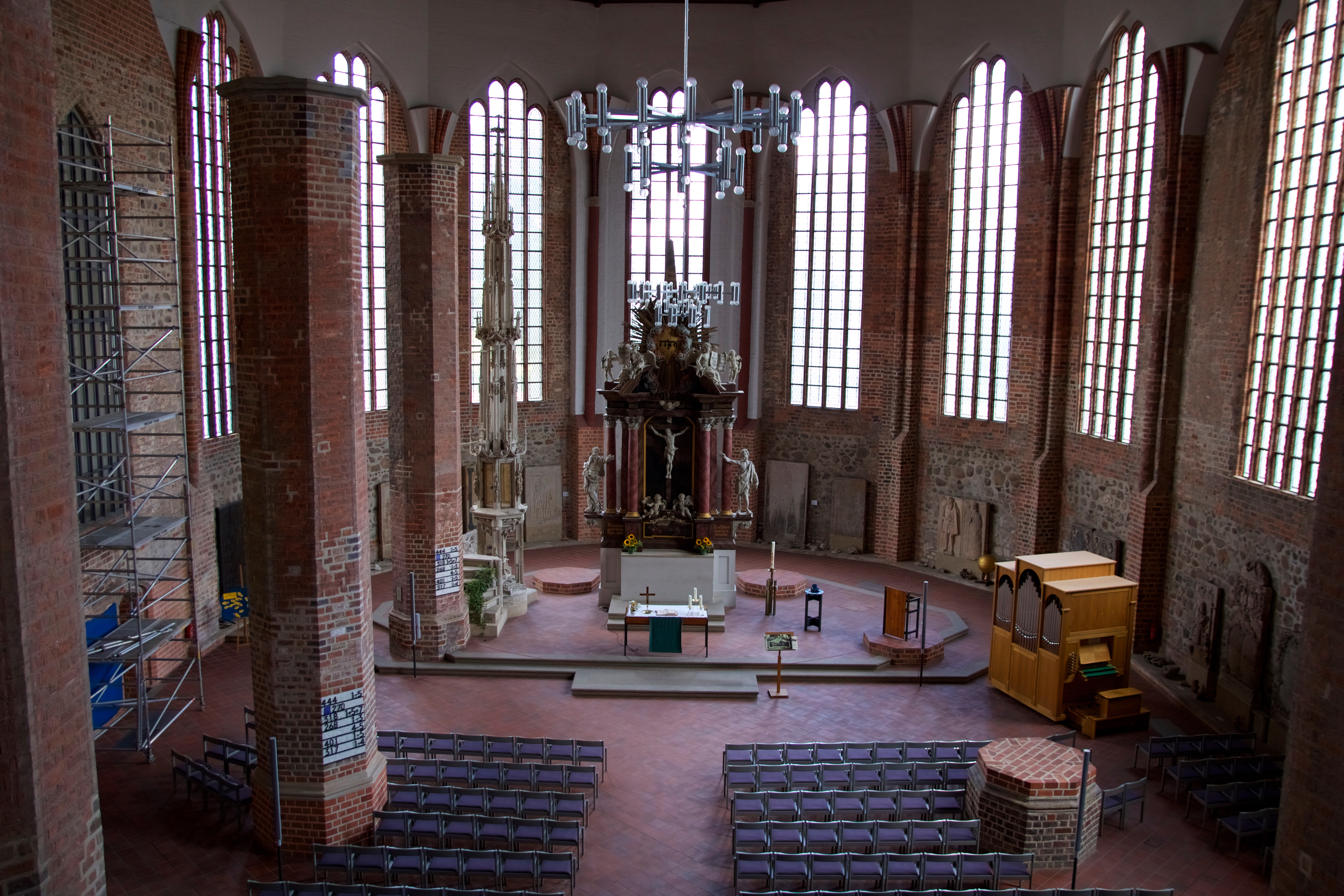
Interior of the reconstructed cathedral: View of the original sacrament house and the new altar.

A full-scale reconstruction of the exterior of the cathedral had been completed by 1995, but the interior was redesigned in a postmodern style in order to commemorate the cathedral's destruction and to accommodate a new parish centre as well as other facilities. Steel-framed glass walls separate the newly created rooms underneath the organ gallery from the nave of the cathedral.

The original pulpit altar which had been destroyed in 1945 was replaced by an early eighteenth-century altar (on permanent loan from a church in Jüterbog). The cathedral's Gothic vaulting was only partially reconstructed and supplemented by a plain wooden ceiling.

== Cathedral organ ==
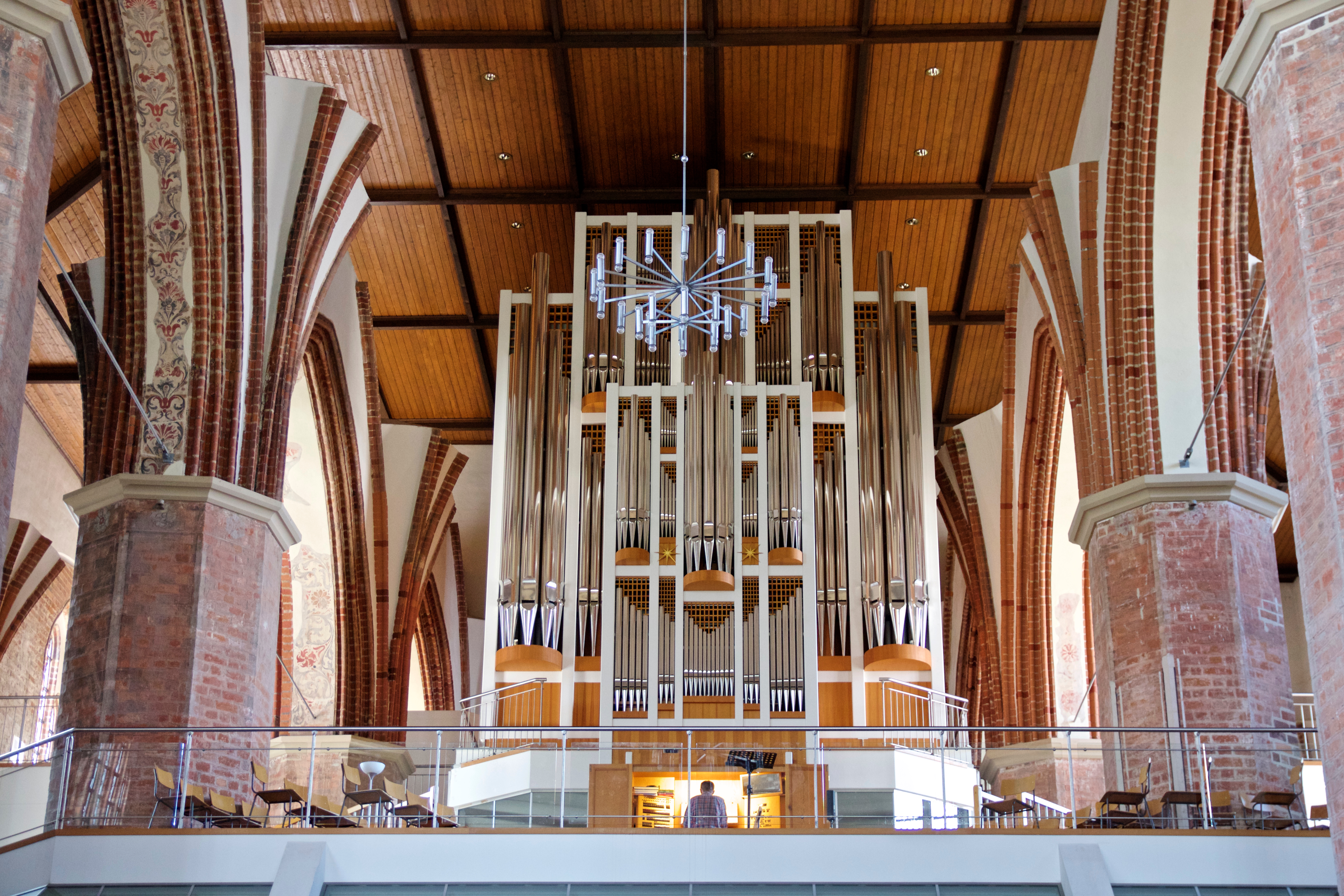
Newly installed Schuke organ

After the reconstruction of the cathedral a 1967 pipe organ by Alexander Schuke, which had originally been built for St. Thomas Church, Leipzig, was transferred to Fürstenwalde. The rebuilt and enlarged instrument with four manuals and 64 speaking stops was installed in 2005. The cathedral is regularly used for concerts and hosts an international recital series.

== Burials ==
- Georg von Blumenthal (1490 – 25 September 1550) Prince-Bishop of Ratzeburg and Bishop of Lebus
