= Schönfließ Dorf station =

Railway station in Germany

Schönfließ Dorf

General information
- Location: Bahnhofstraße 3; 15326 Lebus; Brandenburg; Germany
- Coordinates: 52°26′13″N 14°28′22″E
- Owner: Deutsche Bahn
- Operator: DB Netz; DB Station&Service
- Line: Eberswalde–Frankfurt (Oder) railway
- Platforms: 1 side platform
- Tracks: 2

Other information
- Station code: 5660
- DS100 code: BSOE
- IBNR: 8012914
- Category: 6
- Fare zone: VBB: Frankfurt (Oder) C/5772
- Website: www.bahnhof.de
Location

Schönfließ Dorf station is a railway station in the Schönfließ district of the municipality of Lebus, located in the Märkisch-Oderland district in Brandenburg, Germany.
