= Thomas Aderpul =

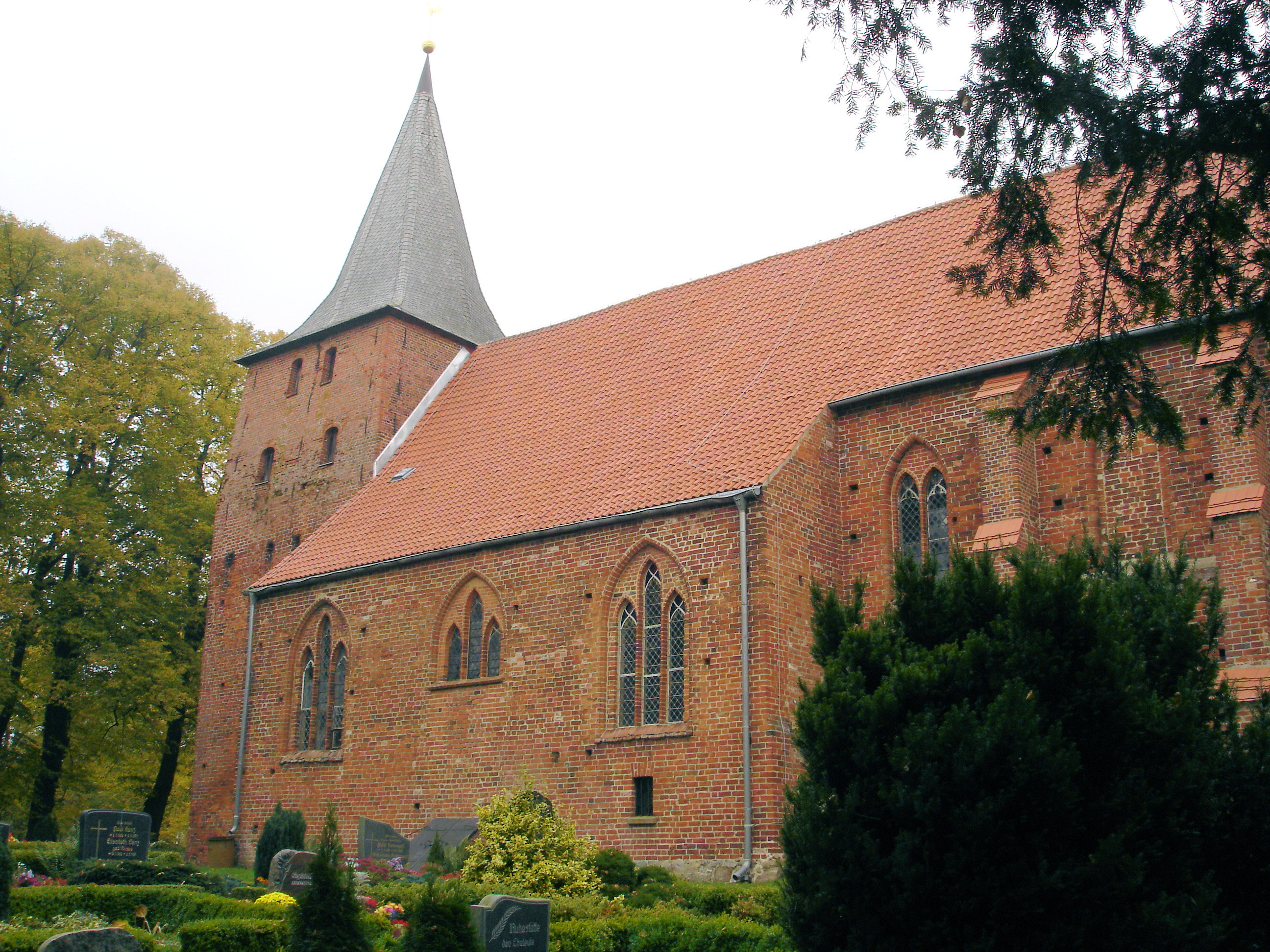
Brick Gothic church in Gressow, Mecklenburg

Thomas Aderpul was a preacher of the Protestant Reformation who taught an extreme form of egalitarian religious polity; consequently, the German Democratic Republic admired him as a proto-communist.

Aderpul came to public notice in 1529 in the Klützer Ort, a district between Wismar and Lübeck, which was on Mecklenburg territory but fell within the Bishopric of Ratzeburg, and was mostly owned by the von Plessen family who had built up considerable debts to the diocese. They saw the Reformation as an opportunity to evade their financial obligations. Appointments to livings on estates were generally made by the lord of the manor with the approval of the diocesan bishop. Bernd von Plessen deliberately provoked the Bishop of Ratzeburg, Georg von Blumenthal, by dismissing the two Catholic incumbents of the parish of Gressow, which was on his estates, one of them on the non-theological grounds that he only had one eye, and to replace them with Aderpuhl, who was already married, as the pastor. The church bureaucracy was slow to react; however, on 20 December, the Cathedral Provost Mus reported this irregularity to the Bishop. The latter complained to the Duke of Mecklenburg, reporting his letter that early in December 1529 Aderpul had preached that “All things above, below and in the earth, wood, water, meadow and game, should be held equally in common and belong to no-one in particular.”

The next day the Bishop had him seized in a night raid and locked up in the dungeon of his splendid official residence at Schönberg. When Bernd von Plessen demanded his release, the Bishop replied that the preacher was a knave and a trickster, that he knew perfectly well how to handle preachers, that he recognized only the higher authority of the Pope, and that the von Plessens had not even bothered to write to him in advance of making the appointment. Bernd von Plessen also complained to Duke Henry of Mecklenburg, arguing that Gressow was outside the Bishop's jurisdiction and that the arrest was an act of war on Mecklenburg. The Duke tried to intercede on Aderpuhl's behalf, and an angry correspondence about jurisdiction ensued.

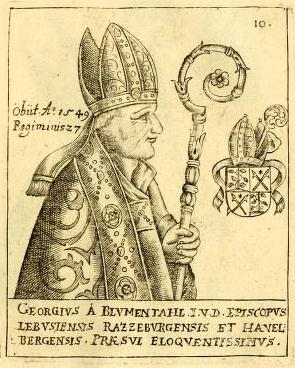
Bishop Georg von Blumenthal

When the von Plessens’ separate official letter of complaint to the Bishop was delivered, he showed it to his Castellan Bernd von Rohr and said:

"Was sollen die Klützörter tun! Wenn es eine gute große Kanne Bier wäre, so wären die Klützeorter gute Nachbarn dazu, sie söffen sie wohl aus” (What do you expect of the Klützer Ort people? If there had been a good big pin of beer, they would have been excellent neighbours to it and drunk it dry.) To which the castellan replied: "Gnädiger Herr, die Gesellen, die die große Kanne Bier wohl aussaufen können, die lassen sich auch wohl finden und halten, was sie zusagen." (My gracious Lord, our friends who can drain the pin of beer will let themselves be traced, and we will hold them to their promise).

As the Bishop would not budge, the following morning Bernd von Plessen got his brothers and relatives together and took matters into his own hands. With the exception of the von Bernstorfs, the von Plessens gathered together the entire nobility of the Klützer Ort. On Boxing Day 1529, the armed cavalcade – 100 knights and many men-at-arms, marched up to the castle gates where the bishop was lodged, with his prisoner in the dungeon below. They demanded entry with a fanfare of trumpeters and were answered with three gunshots. Bernd von Plessen's men rampaged through Bünstorf, Blüssen, Rodenberg, Rüschenbek, and Papenhusen. All were looted, women in childbed were hauled out of bed and robbed of their bedlinen. In Blüssen, they broke into the chapel, got out the church vestments and mocked them, and wounded the Bishop's Vicar. Between them they stole 251 horses, 279 head of cattle, 465 sheep and 32 swine. Within ten days the Bishop was putting his case before the high court at Mecklenburg.

The records of the case show who took part in this rampage. There were thirteen von Plessens, Eggert von Quitzow and his three sons from Vogtshagen; five von Bülows; and nobles from the von Negendank, von der Brook, von Booth, von Schosse, von Passewitz, von Scharfenbereg, von Warnstedt, von Dambek, von Lützow, von Strahlendorf and von Bibow families. Most of these were locals, but some came from farther afield and one or two, notably Melchior von Warnstedt, even from the Bishop's native Prignitz.

The Duke of Mecklenburg ordered the von Plessens to keep the peace, but as this did not satisfy the Bishop he kept Aderpul locked up for a further year in Schönberg, when he was released with the remark that he had forever made himself an enemy in his domains. He ended his days as a Lutheran parish priest in Bützow.
