= Diocese of Lebus =

Former Latin Catholic jurisdiction in Poland/Germany

Diocese of Lebus Dioecesis Lubucensis
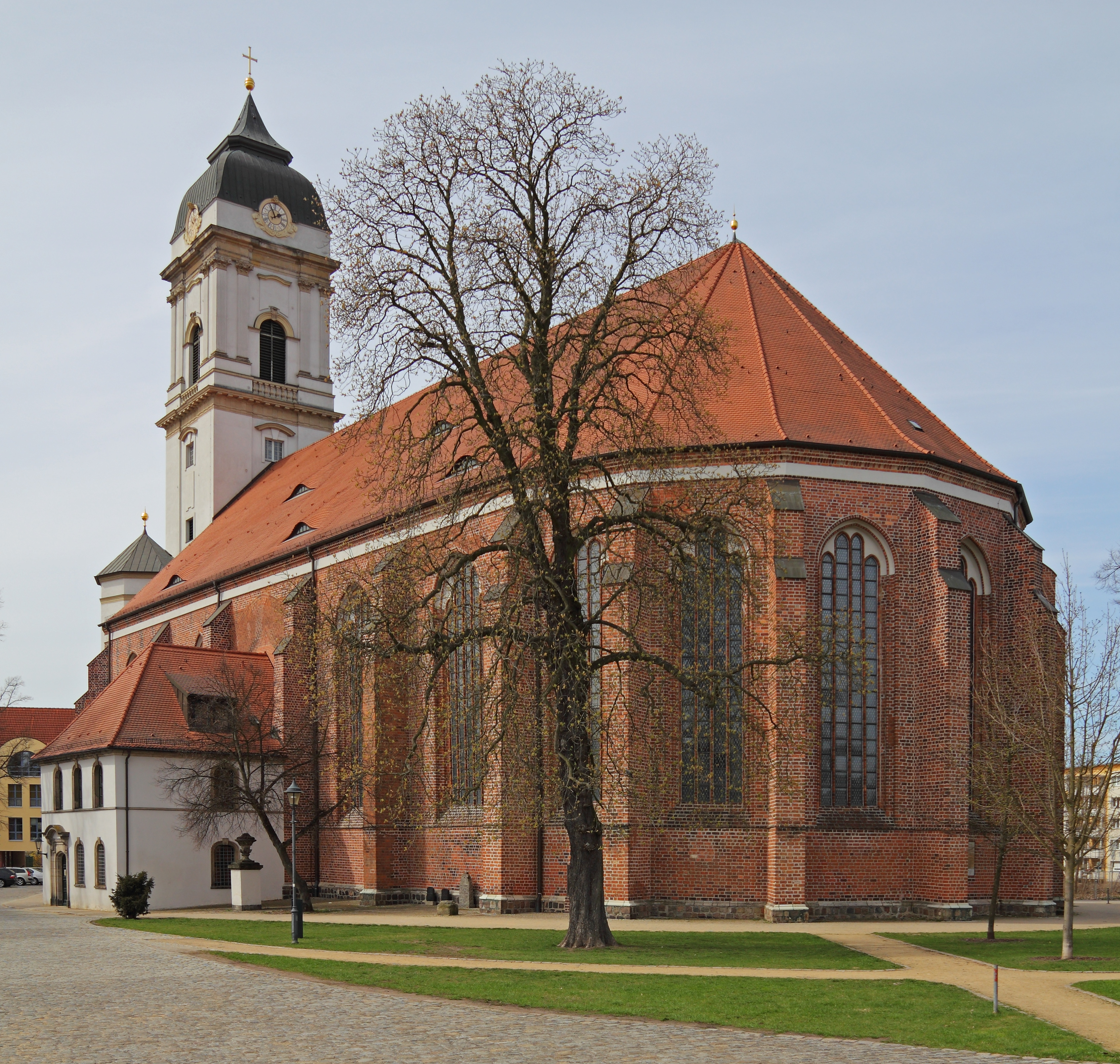
- St. Mary's Cathedral, Fürstenwalde, the last cathedral of the diocese

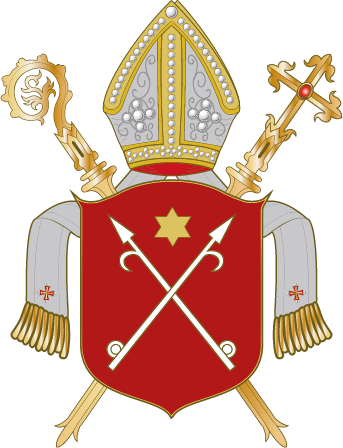
- Coat of arms

Location
- Territory: Lubusz Land
- Ecclesiastical province: Gniezno (1125–1424); Magdeburg (1424–1598)

Information
- Denomination: Catholic Church
- Sui iuris church: Latin Church
- Rite: Roman Rite
- Established: 1125
- Dissolved: 1598

Map
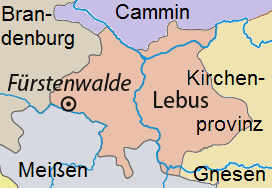
- Diocese of Lebus before the Reformation

The Diocese of Lebus (Latin: Dioecesis Lubucensis; German: Bistum Lebus; Polish: Diecezja Lubuska) is a former diocese of the Catholic Church. It was erected in 1125 and suppressed in 1598. The Bishop of Lebus was also, ex officio, the ruler of a lordship that was coextensive with the territory of the diocese. The geographic remit included areas that are today part of the land of Brandenburg in Germany and the Province of Lubusz in Poland. It included areas on both sides of the Oder River around the town of Lebus (Polish: Lubusz). The cathedral was built on the castle hill in Lubusz and was dedicated to St Adalbert of Prague. Later, the seat moved to Górzyca (German: Göritz), back to Lebus and finally to Fürstenwalde (Polish: Przybór) on the River Spree.

It bordered the Diocese of Poznań to the east, the Diocese of Brandenburg to the west, the Diocese of Cammin (Kamień) to the north and the Diocese of Meissen to the south.

== Establishment ==
The Lubusz Land formed part of Poland since the reign of its first historic ruler Mieszko I in the 10th century. In 968, the Diocese of Poznań was founded as Poland's first Catholic diocese, covering the territory of Poland. In 1000, the Archdiocese of Gniezno was founded, directly subordinate to the Holy See rather than to a German archdiocese; this kept Poland independent from the Holy Roman Empire throughout the Middle Ages.

The Diocese of Lubusz was established about 1125 at the behest of Bolesław III Wrymouth, Polish monarch from the Piast dynasty. The diocese covered the Lubusz Land, located in the westernmost part of Poland. The diocese was established to counter attempts at eastward expansion of the Holy Roman Empire by Emperor Henry V and by the Archbishop of Magdeburg. The Diocese of Lubusz was erected as a suffragan of the Archdiocese of Gniezno. Its seat was located in Lubusz, an important Polish stronghold against incursions by the Kingdom of Germany, described in 13th-century chronicles as "the key to the Kingdom of Poland". Duke Bolesław prompted the construction of the Cathedral of St. Adalbert on the castle hill in Lubusz. The cathedral was later destroyed.

== List of Bishops ==
The diocese was headed by the Bishop of Lebus who was elected by the cathedral chapter.

This is a list of the ordinaries of the diocese:

- Bernhard I (1133 Appointed – 1147 Died)
- Stefan I (1149 Appointed – 1156 Died)
- Bernhard II (1156 Appointed – 1180 Died)
- Gaudenty (1180 Appointed – )
- Arnold (1191 Appointed – )
- Cyprian, Ordo Praemonstratensis (1198 Appointed – 1 Mar 1201 Appointed, Bishop of Wrocław)
- Wawrzyniec (1209 Appointed – 9 Mar 1233 Died)
- Henry I (1233 Appointed – 1244 Died)
- Nanker (15 Oct 1248 Appointed – 1250 Died)
- Wilhelm I of Nysa (7 Mar 1252 Appointed – 1273 Died)
- Wilhelm II (1274 Appointed – 1282 Died)
- Wolmir (1282 Appointed – 6 Jan 1284 Died)
- Konrad (12 Nov 1284 Appointed – 22 Jul 1299 Died)
- Jan (1300 Appointed – 1302 Died)
- Fryderyk I (10 Jan 1305 Appointed – 1313 Died)
- Stefan II (17 Oct 1326 Confirmed – 24 Feb 1345 Died)
- Apeczko of Ząbkowice (19 Oct 1345 Appointed – 13 Apr 1352 Died)
- Henry of Bancz (Bantsch) (7 Jan 1353 Appointed – 30 Aug 1365 Died)
- Peter of Opole (8 Jun 1366 Appointed – 26 Mar 1375 Died)
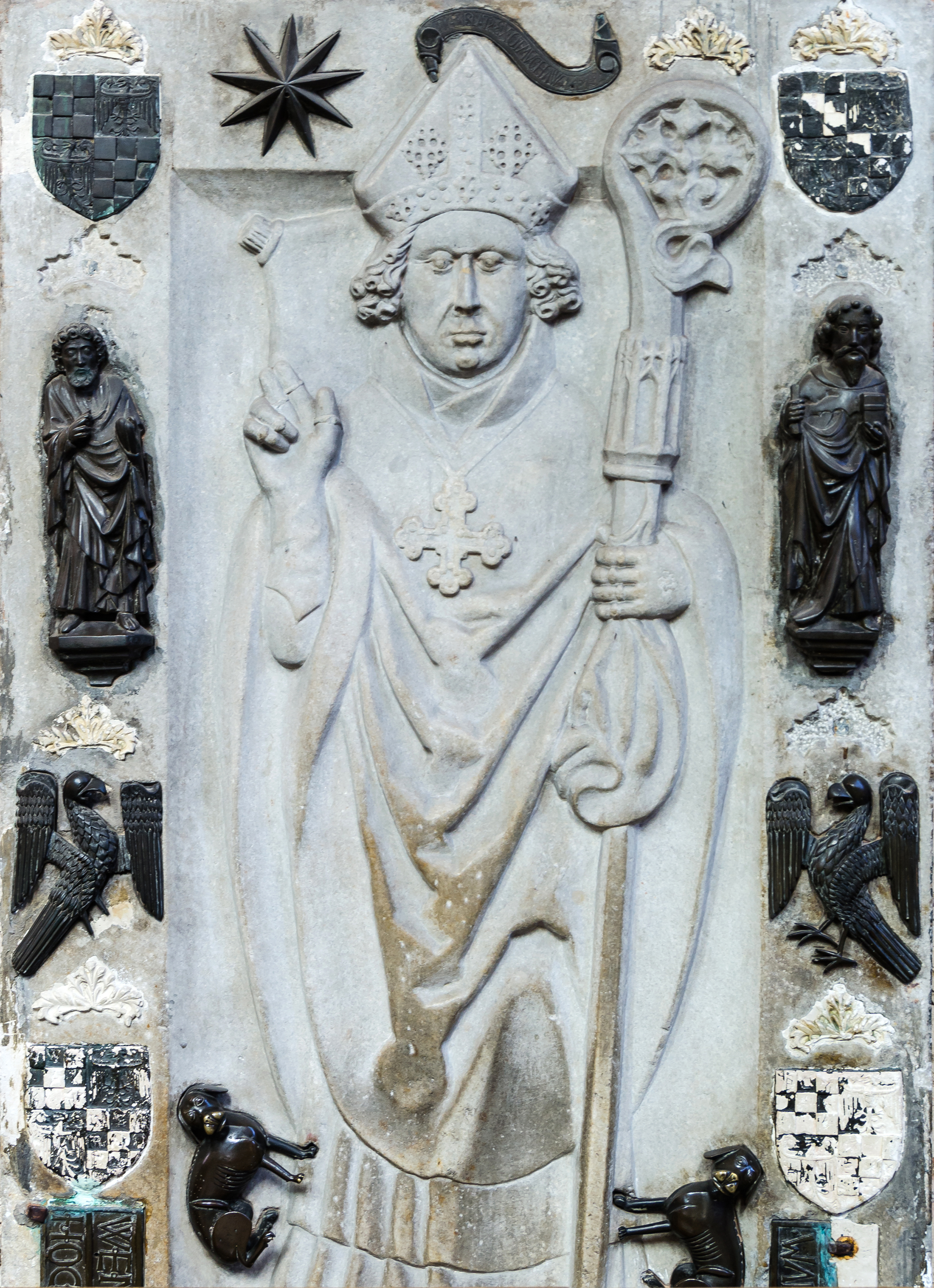
  Tombstone of Bishop Wenceslaus II of Legnica in Nysa
- Wenceslaus II of Legnica (3 Dec 1375 Appointed – 28 Jul 1382 Confirmed, Bishop of Wrocław)
- Jan Kietlicz (3 Dec 1382 Confirmed – 2 Sep 1392 Appointed, Bishop of Meissen)
- Jan Mráz (15 Nov 1392 Appointed – 20 Jul 1397 Appointed, Bishop of Olomouc)
- Jan z Borsznic (24 Sep 1397 Appointed – 27 Mar 1420 Appointed, Archbishop of Esztergom)
- Jan z Wałdowa (29 Mar 1420 Appointed – 1423 Died)
- Jan z Wałdowa (11 Sep 1423 Appointed – 5 Mar 1424 Died)
- Krzysztof von Rotenhan (11 Oct 1424 Appointed – 22 Sep 1436 Died)
- Piotr von Burgsdorff (9 Jan 1437 Appointed – 29 Jun 1439 Died)
- Konrad Kron (1440 Appointed – 2 Jan 1443 Died)
- Jan von Deher (16 Oct 1443 Appointed – 28 Jul 1455 Died)
- Friedrich Sesselmann (1 Dec 1455 Confirmed – 21 Sep 1483 Died)
- Liborius von Schlieben (26 Jan 1484 Appointed – 27 Apr 1486 Died)
- Ludwig Burgsdorf (3 Aug 1487 Appointed – Jun 1490 Died)
- Dietrich von Bülow (5 Nov 1490 Confirmed - 1 Oct 1523 Died)
- Georg von Blumenthal (6 Apr 1524 Confirmed - 25 Oct 1550 Died). He was the last Catholic bishop in north Germany.
- Johann Horneburg (5 Oct 1551 Appointed - 16 Jun 1555 Died). He converted to Lutheranism.

== Governance ==
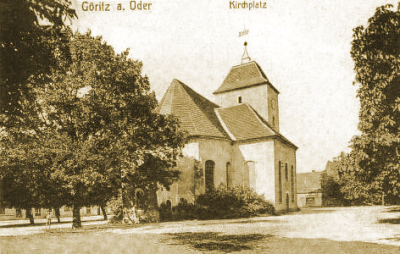
The former cathedral in Göritz/Górzyca in the early 20th century

The cathedra of the see was moved three times.

- Göritz/Górzyca (1276–1325);
- Lebus/Lubusz (1354–1373/85);
- Fürstenwalde/Przybór (1385–1558).

With the fragmentation of Poland among the sons of Boleslaus, the Lubusz Land at various times belonged to the provincial duchies of Silesia, Głogów, Greater Poland and Legnica. The area became a destination for the Germans Ostsiedlung. Polish monarch Henry II the Pious died in 1241 at the Battle of Legnica fighting the Mongol invasion of Poland. Seven years later in 1248, his son Bolesław II the Horned permanently lost the Lubusz Land to the archbishopric of Magdeburg and the Ascanian margraviate of Brandenburg. Bolesław sold half of the land to Archbishopic of Magdeburg; the other half was captured by Ascanian nobles.

== Lordship of Lebus ==
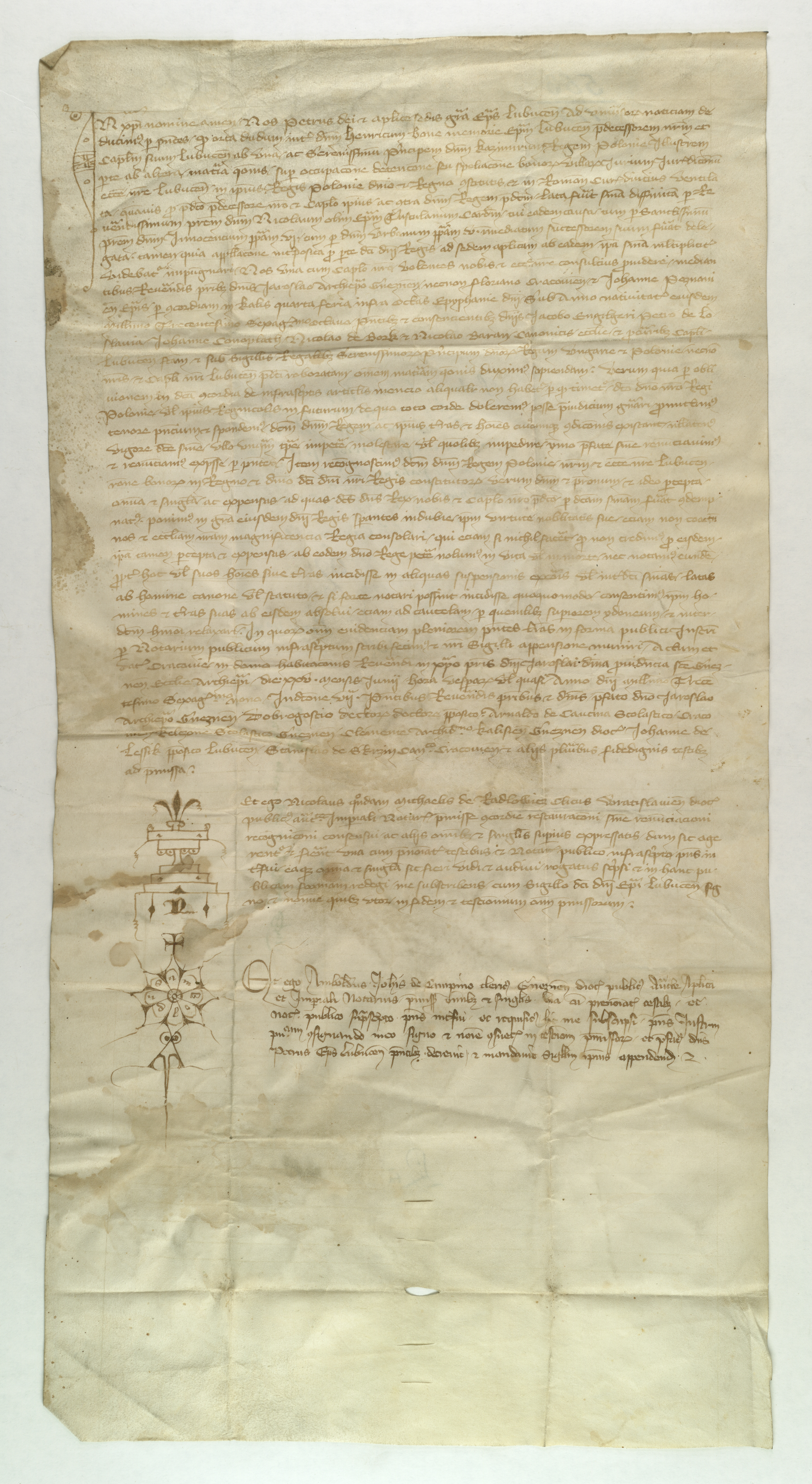
Supplementary agreement on the emolument of the diocese between Bishop Piotr of Opole and King Casimir III of Poland

When Bolesław III Wrymouth erected the diocese, at the same time he created a lordship that was co-extensive with the territory of the diocese. This lordship or bishopric was not a prince-bishopric or state of the Holy Roman Empire since it was in the Polish realm at the time of its creation.

While the Ascani and the Wettin archbishops competed for influence, the diocese itself remained subordinate to Gniezno. In 1245, the brothers John and Otto — joint Margraves of Brandenburg — annexed lands in the region of Teltow, Barnim, the Uckermark, and the Lordship of Stargard to Brandenburg. In the same year, the brothers captured the castle of Köpenick and a fortress at Mittenwalde. From these bases, they expanded further to the east. By 1249, they had acquired the Lubusz Land and reached the river Oder. In this way the lordship became part of a state that was itself a state of the Empire; it was a condominium of Brandenburg and Magdeburg. After this, tensions arose between the claims of Polish and Magdeburg representatives for influence in the diocese. Since the bishops of Lebus generally supported Polish interests, some time after 1276 they moved the seat of the see east of the Oder to Göritz (Górzyca) due to the pressure exerted by Brandenburg. The margraves of Brandenburg began to annex further Polish territories to the east of the Oder to their newly formed region of Neumark ("New March"). Despite the Polish loss of the region, the Diocese remained a suffragan of the Polish Archdiocese of Gniezno, and several Polish bishops were still appointed, and under Bohemian (Czech) rule (1373–1415) also several Czechs served as Bishops.

With the extinction of the Brandenburg branch of the House of Ascania in 1320, disputes arose in the March. Bishop Stephan II openly supported King Władysław the Elbow-high, who went to the Neumark region with Polish and Lithuanian troops. In 1325, in retaliation, Margrave Louis the Brandenburger ordered the governor of the Prince-bishopric — Erich von Wulkow — to capture the episcopal possessions and to destroy the cathedral in Göritz. Bishop Stephen fled to Poland.

In 1354, Louis's successor in Brandenburg — Louis II — was reconciled with Bishop Henry Bentsch: the episcopal possessions were returned and the seat also returned to Lebus, where a new cathedral was built. The castle and lordship of Lebus were also left to the bishop.

By the terms of the Treaty of Fürstenwalde, Emperor Charles IV purchased the Margraviate of Brandenburg from the childless Margrave Otto VII of Brandenburg. In 1373 the lordship was attacked by the emperor's troops. Charles incorporated the lands into the lands of the Bohemian Crown thereby ending the connection of the House of Wittelsbach to the Brandenburg margraviate. The episcopal seat moved, for the final time, to Fürstenwalde. Since the collegiate church in Lebus had been destroyed, Bishop Wenceslaus II of Legnica from the Piast dynasty raised St. Mary's Church to the status of a cathedral.

Polish monarchs still made peaceful attempts to regain the region but in 1424, the diocese became subordinate to the Prince-Archbishopric of Magdeburg.

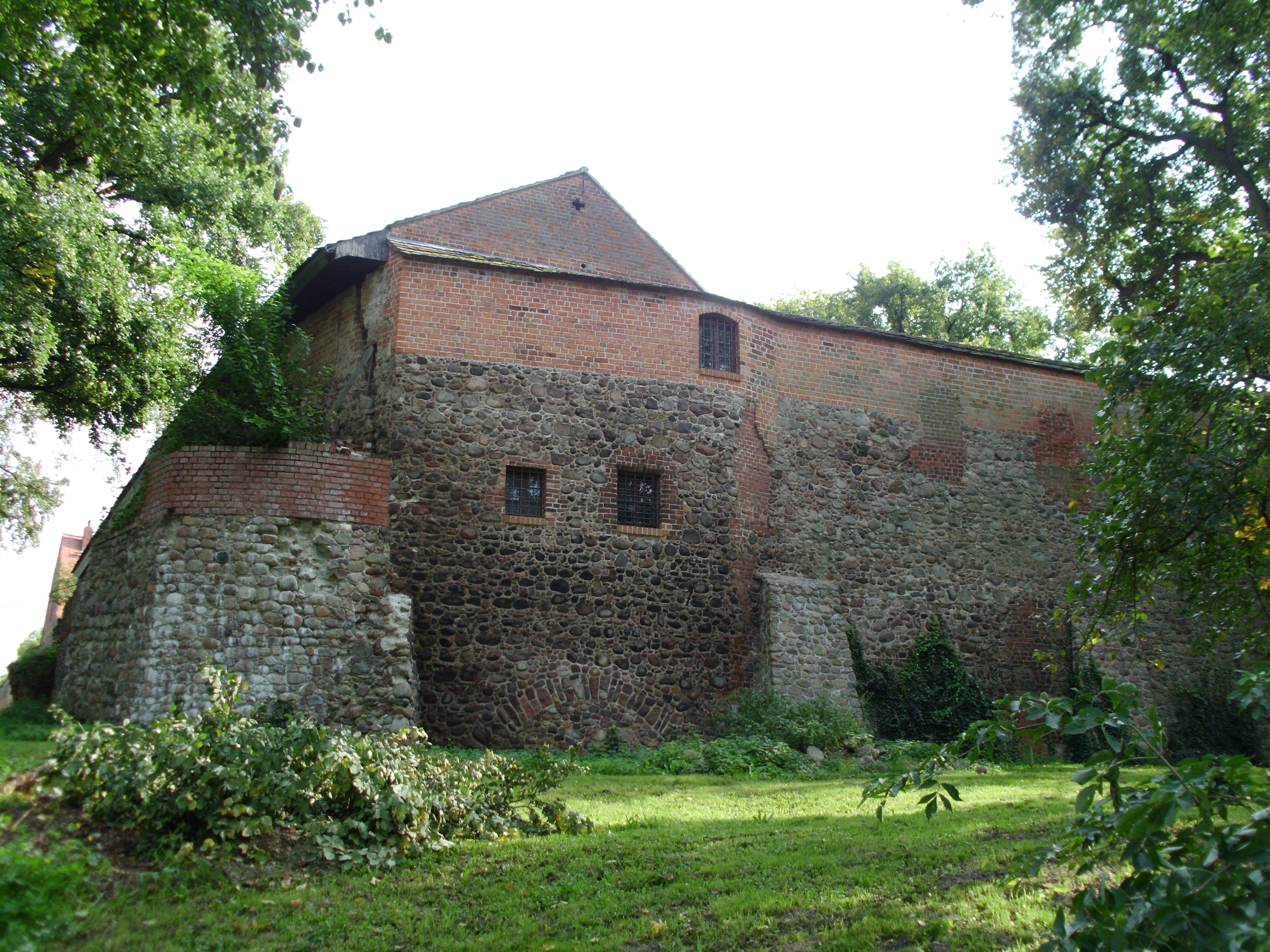
Castle in Beeskow, place of death of the last Catholic bishop in 1555

The status of the bishop during this period is summarised by Albrecht III Achilles, the Elector of Brandenburg since 1471, who remarked, "What does it matter to us that there is a Bishop of Lebus or who he is, so long as he is a good honest man who is useful to the lordship and its territories? For in any case, whether he likes it or not, he must do whatever a Margrave of Brandenburg pleases in reasonable concerns affecting the Margrave and his territory. This meant that the incumbent's loyalties to the Margravate must precede loyalty to the Emperor.

In 1518, Ulrich of Bieberstein enfeoffed Storkow Castle to Bishop Dietrich von Bülow. The castle was then expanded into an episcopal residenz. In 1518, the lordship also acquired the town of Beeskow. Upon the death of the last bishop in 1555, it was presented as a gift to the Hohenzollern margrave John of Brandenburg-Küstrin by King Ferdinand I of Bohemia. Together with neighbouring Beeskow, they merged into the Brandenburg electorate upon John's death in 1571.

== Disestablishment ==
The Protestant Reformation, with the support of the Electors of Brandenburg, resulted in most of northern Germany being lost to the Holy See. When Bishop Georg von Blumenthal died, he was the last Catholic bishop in northern Germany. When the Lutheran administrator Johann Horneburg died, the lordship was formally incorporated into Brandenburg. In 1598, the Church formally suppressed the diocese.

== Legacy ==
The name of the historical bishopric was invoked again in 1945 when the newly acquired Polish Recovered Territories were put under the Apostolic Administration of Kamień, Lubusz and the Prelature of Piła whose name openly implied that it was the successor of the Diocese of Lebus, a claim subsequently upheld by the succeeding Diocese of Gorzów later renamed Diocese of Zielona Góra-Gorzów, though less outright.

== Sources ==
- From Lebus to Fürstenwalde. Brief History of the Medieval Diocese of Lebus (1124 - 1555/98). Heinz Teichmann, Leipzig 1991, ISBN 3-7462-0532-8
- Heinrich Grimm: Bülow, Dietrich von. In: New German Biography (NDB). Volume 2, Duncker & Humblot, Berlin 1955, ISBN 3-428-00183-4, p. 733 (digitized).
- Theodor Hirsch: Bülow, Dietrich von. In: General German Biography (ADB). Volume 5, Duncker & Humblot, Leipzig 1877, p. 182 f.
- Hartmut Krohm, Alexander Bindr: The Sacrament House in St. Mary's Cathedral in Fürstenwalde. Findling, Neuenhagen 2003. ISBN 3-933603-13-7
