= Lebus =

- Town
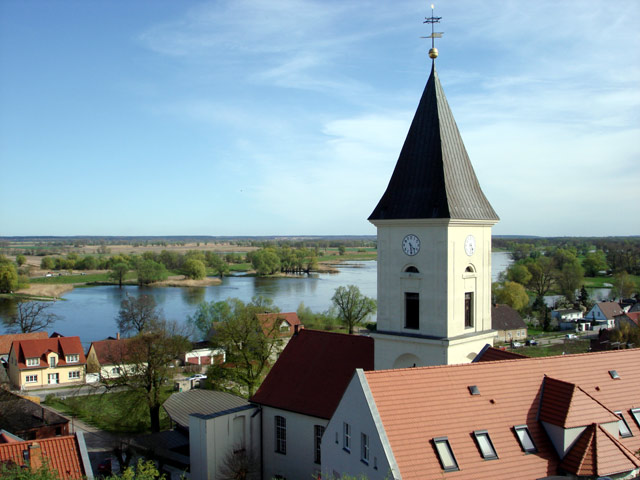

- Coat of arms

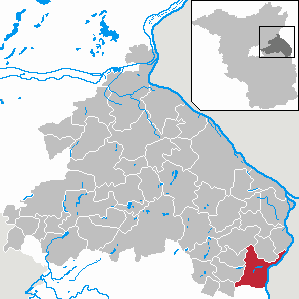
- Location of Lebus within Märkisch-Oderland district
- Interactive map of Lebus
- Location within Germany Location within Brandenburg
- Coordinates: 52°25′00″N 14°31′59″E
- Country: Germany
- State: Brandenburg
- District: Märkisch-Oderland
- Municipal assoc.: Lebus
- Subdivisions: 3 Ortsteile

Government
  - Mayor (2024–29): Ralf-Tore Fabig

Area
  - Total: 54.29 km^{2} (20.96 sq mi)
- Elevation: 20 m (66 ft)

Population (2025-12-31)
  - Total: 3,015
  - Density: 55.54/km^{2} (143.8/sq mi)
- Time zone: UTC+01:00 (CET)
  - Summer (DST): UTC+02:00 (CEST)
- Postal codes: 15326
- Dialling codes: 033604
- Vehicle registration: MOL
- Website: www.amt-lebus.de

Lebus (pronounced [leˈbuːs]; Polish: Lubusz, pronounced [ˈlubuʂ]) is a historic town in the Märkisch-Oderland District of Brandenburg, Germany. It is the administrative seat of Amt ("collective municipality") Lebus. The town, located on the west bank of the Oder river at the border with Poland, was the centre of the historical region known as Lubusz Land, which provides the name for the present-day Polish Lubusz Voivodeship.

== Geography ==
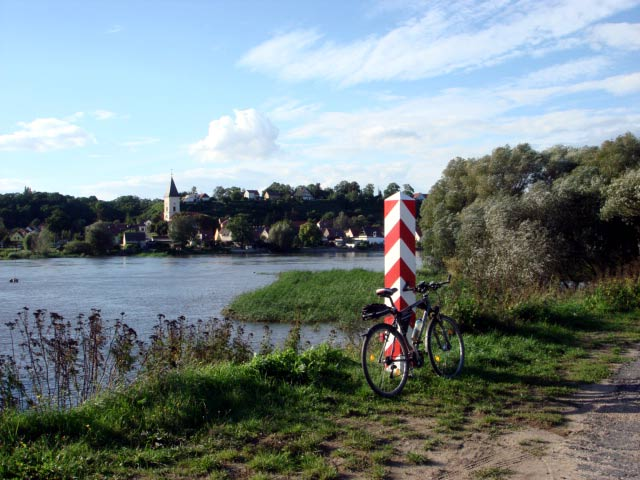
View across the Oder river

Lebus is situated in the southeast of Märkisch-Oderland District, on a ridge at the left bank of the middle Oder river, which since the implementation of the Oder–Neisse line in 1945 marks the eastern German border with Poland. The town centre is located about 10 km (6.2 mi) north of Frankfurt (Oder).

The municipal area comprises the localities of Lebus proper, Mallnow, Schönfließ, and Wulkow. Schönfließ Dorf station is a stop on the Eberswalde–Frankfurt (Oder) railway line served by the Niederbarnimer Eisenbahn carrier.

== History ==
Settlement in the Lebus region has been traced as far back as 3,000 years. The ridges provided natural defense and led to fortifications being constructed upon them. The Germanic Lombards and Semnoni are believed to have lived in the area before the Common Era. After the Migration Period, since approximately 7th century AD, the area was inhabited by the Slavic Leubuzzi tribes, part of the West Slavic Veleti federation which later were called Lutici in Saxon sources. They were considered to be transitional between the Polabian Slavs and Polans settling in the east. Their lands on both sides of the Oder river became known as Terra Lebusana ("Land of the Leubuzzi" in Latin, Polish: Ziemia Lubuska).

Historical affiliations

- Poland
  - duchy 960s–1025
  - kingdom 1025–1249
- Brandenburg 1249–1618
- Brandenburg-Prussia 1618–1701
- Prussia (Kingdom of Prussia) 1701–1871
- Germany
  - empire 1871–1918
  - republic 1918–1933
  - National Socialist dictatorship 1933–1945
  - Allied-occupied 1945–1949
  - East Germany 1949–1990
  - federal republic since 1990

The region was under Polish control by 966 under the rule of the Piast duke Mieszko I and his son Bolesław I the Brave. The settlement itself was mentioned as a town Liubusua and Libusua urbs in the annals of Thietmari merseburgiensis episcopi chronicon written in the years 1012 - 1018 (under the rule of Bolesław) by the Saxon bishop and chronicler Thietmar of Merseburg. The Polish rulers had a castellany built at the river to control it. Duke Bolesław allied with Emperor Otto III to fight against the Polabian Lutici tribes, sealed in the 1000 Congress of Gniezno. On the other hand, in 13th-century chronicles, Lebus was named "the key to the Kingdom of Poland" and as a Polish stronghold against German invasion.

The Diocese of Lebus was founded in 1124-25 AD, during the reign of the Polish duke Bolesław III Wrymouth to counter and convert the resistant tribes of the Liutizi federation. Dedicated to Saint Adalbert of Prague, it served as an important centre for Christian missionaries preaching in and developing the Oder region. Over the centuries, Lubusz Land turned out to be a battleground for neighbouring rulers. It was especially influenced by the Silesian Piasts, dukes in the Polish Silesia province stretching up the Oder in the southeast. Lubusz Land became part of the Duchy of Silesia in 1138, after the death of duke Bolesław and the fragmentation of Poland. When in 1163 the Hohenstaufen emperor Frederick Barbarossa campaigned Silesia to support the sons of Władysław II the Exile against their Piast cousins, he also granted Lubusz Land on both sides of the Oder as a fief to the Silesian Piasts. German colonization of the region proceeded throughout the 13th century and the settlement became predominantly known as Lebus. The Silesian duke Henry the Bearded granted its citizens town privileges in 1226.

After the death of Henry's son Duke Henry II the Pious in the 1241 Battle of Legnica, the Silesian Piasts were no longer able to maintain their dominant position. For a short time, Lubusz Land was under the rule of Duke Mieszko, a younger son of Henry II, who died about one year later and was buried in the St. Peter's Church in Lubusz. In 1248/49 the Silesian duke Bolesław II Rogatka finally gave town and land in pledge to the Ascanian margraves of Brandenburg and Archbishop Wilbrand of Magdeburg, whose forces had attacked Lubusz Land since the 1230s.

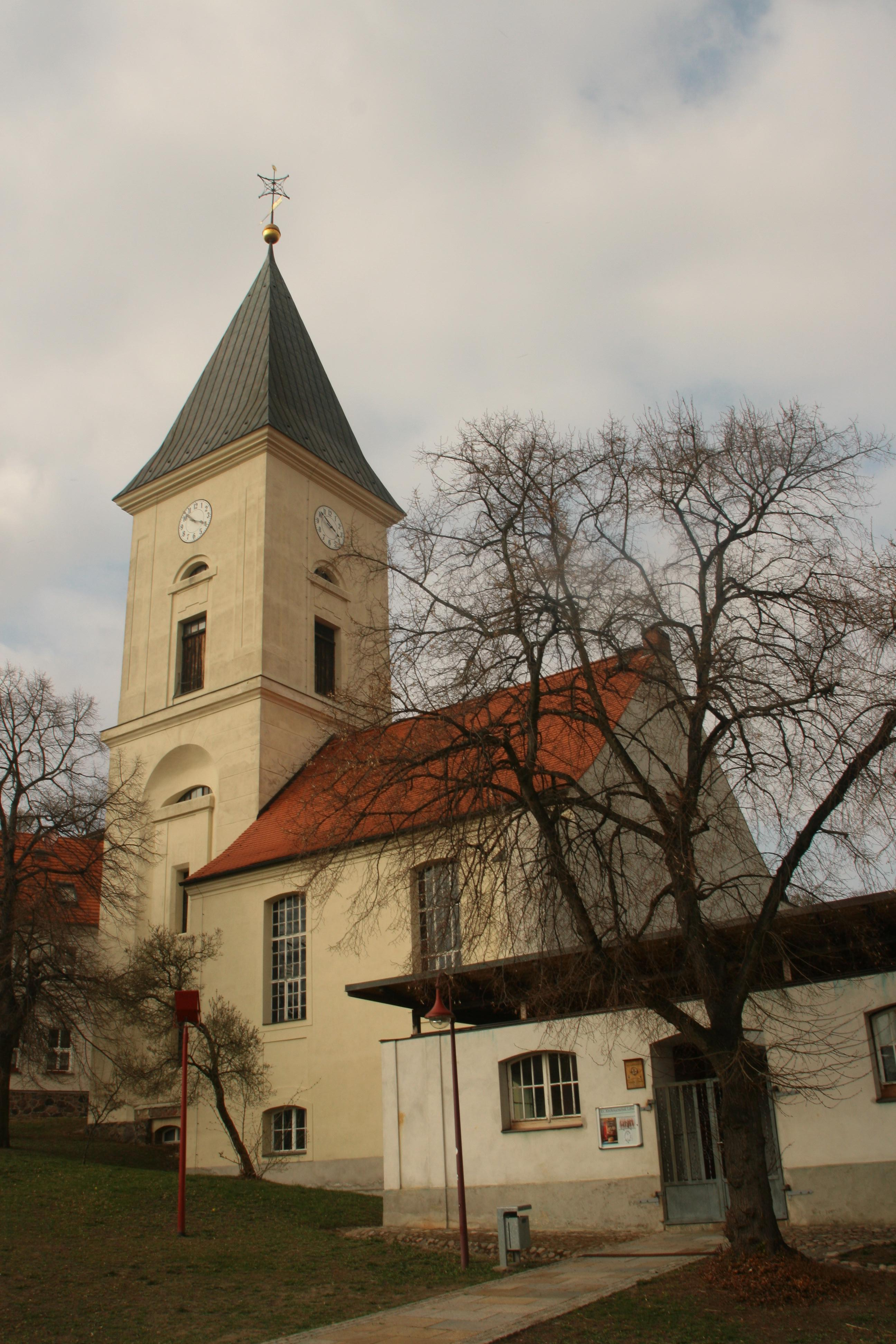
St. Mary's Church

The Brandenburg margraves eventually took over control and during the Late Middle Ages, Lebus served as an important stop on trade routes from the Baltic coast to Italy and from the Greater Polish residence in Poznań to Flanders. However, after the destruction of the town's cathedral by troops of Emperor Charles IV in 1373, during the struggle between the Imperial Houses of Wittelsbach and Luxemburg over the Brandenburg heritage, the seat of the bishopric was moved from Lebus to Fürstenwalde. The populace became Lutheran during the Protestant Reformation, and the bishopric was finally secularized in 1555 following the death of the last Catholic bishop, Georg von Blumenthal.

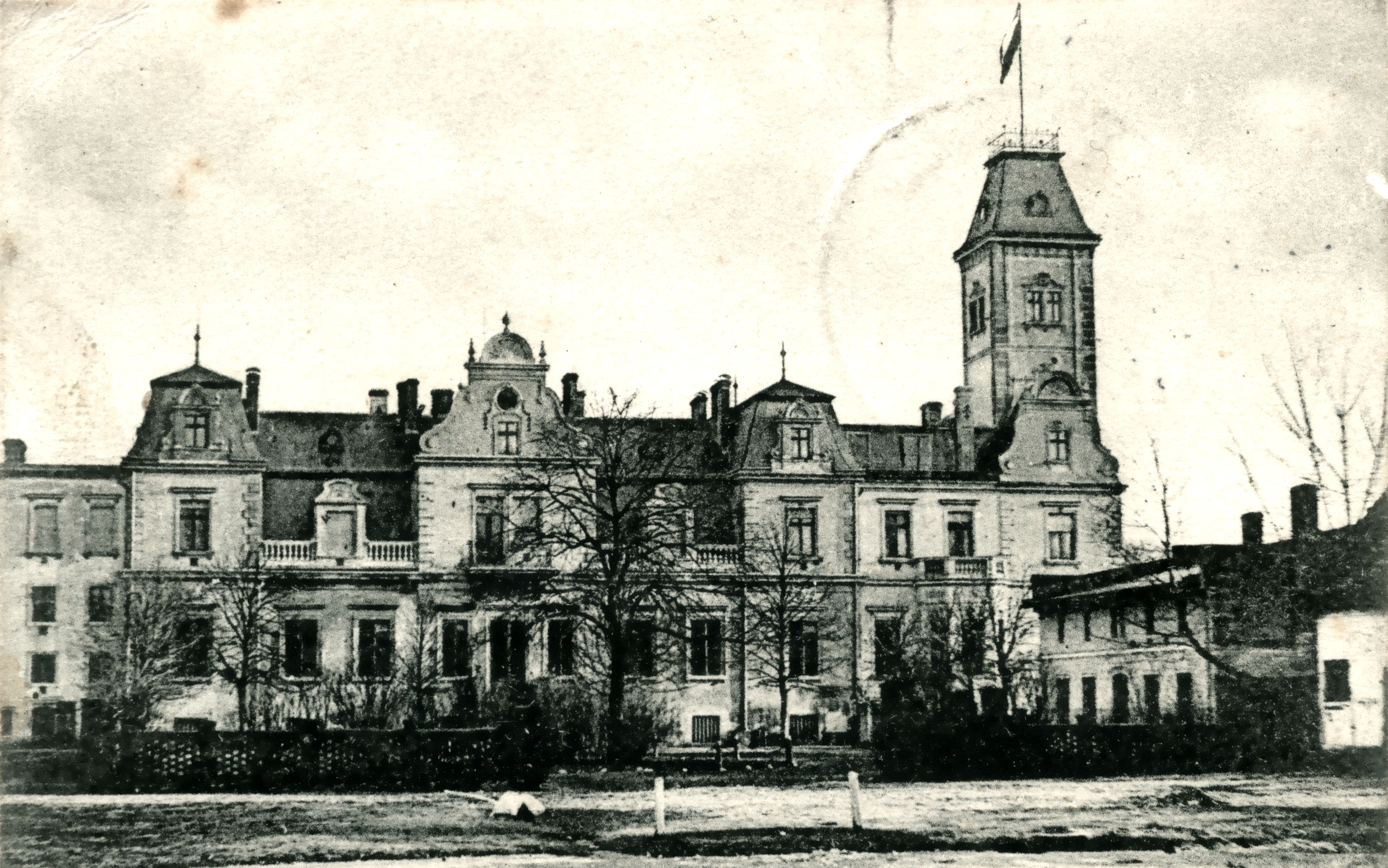
Palace in Wulkow in 1904

After the 16th century fires and political changes weakened the fortifications; the castle was decisively damaged by a lightning strike in 1713. Lebus gradually became a backwater locality. From 1701 onwards, Lebus was part of the Kingdom of Prussia. In 1815 after the Napoleonic Wars, it was administered within the newly established Prussian Province of Brandenburg.

During the last stage of World War II, Lebus, including its medieval center, was almost completely destroyed in the Battle of the Seelow Heights. While the town itself remained part of East Germany, the area east of the Oder passed to the Republic of Poland in 1945 according to the Potsdam Agreement. The parish church of Lebus was restored in 1954.

On 27 June 1977, a misdirected express train of the Reichsbahn and a freight train collided in the Lebus train collision. The accident left 29 dead and many wounded.

Since the last administrative reform of Poland, one of the 16 Polish provinces has been named Lubusz Voivodeship or Province of Lebus.

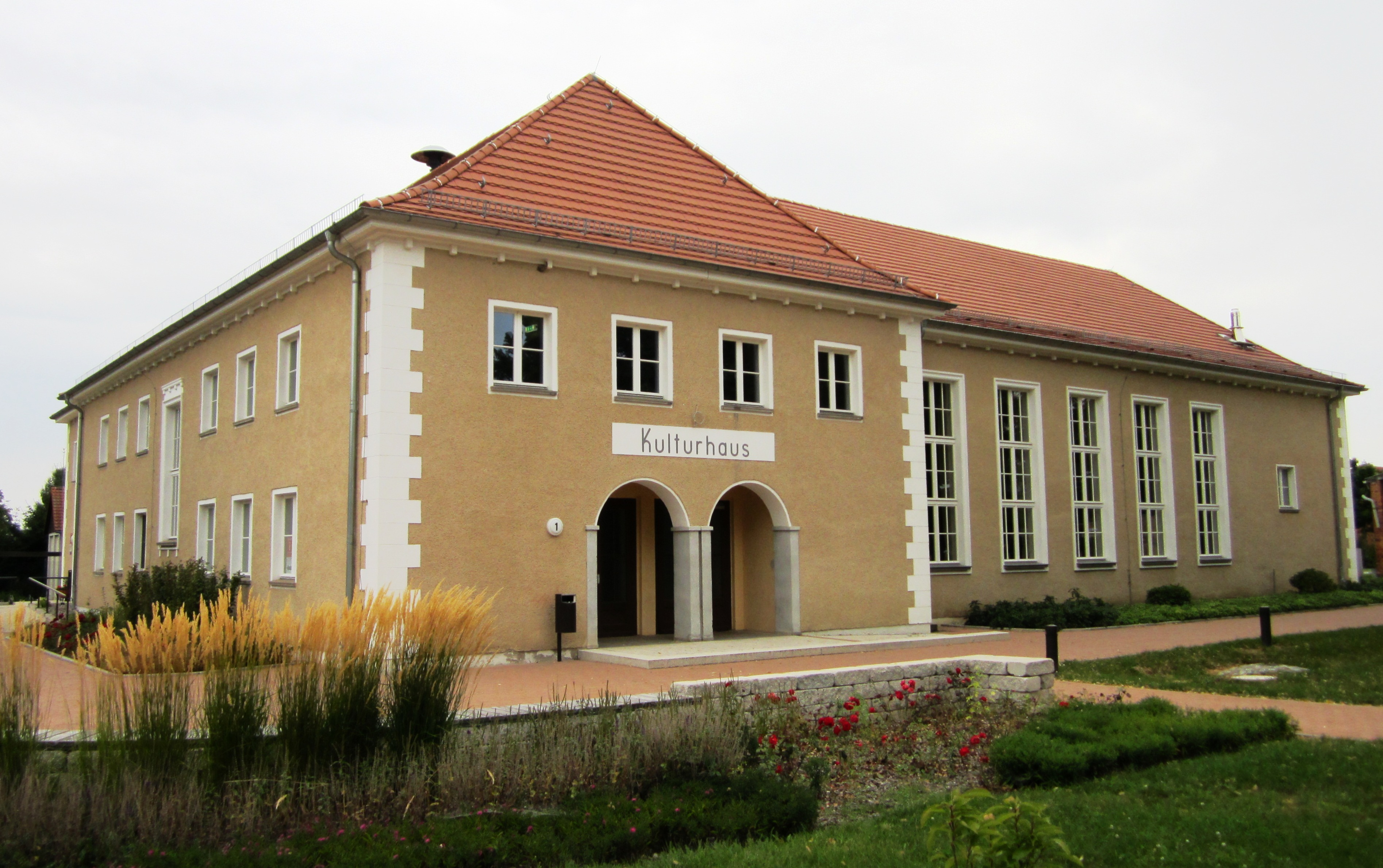
House of Culture

== Politics ==
=== Town council ===
The town council of Lebus has 16 representatives. The voter turnout for the 2019 local elections was 68.8%. Seats upon 2019 local elections:

- Bürger für Lebus (BfL, Citizens' List): 1
- Bürgerallianz für gerechte Kommunalabgaben: 7
- Wählervereinigung unabhängiger Bürger für Lebus (Free Voters): 4
- Christian Democratic Union of Germany (CDU): 2
- Alternative for Germany (AfD): 2

=== Heraldry ===
The coat of arms of Lebus depicts a wolf carrying a sheep in its mouth.

== Demography ==
Development of population since 1875 within the current boundaries (Blue line: Population; Dotted line: Comparison to population development of Brandenburg state; Grey background: Time of Nazi rule; Red background: Time of communist rule)

Lebus: Population development
within the current boundaries (2013)

Year	Pop.	±% p.a.
1875	3,384	—
1890	3,407	+0.05%
1910	2,601	−1.34%
1925	3,510	+2.02%
1933	3,398	−0.40%
1939	3,249	−0.74%
1946	2,452	−3.94%
1950	2,862	+3.94%
1964	2,751	−0.28%
1971	2,740	−0.06%
1981	2,425	−1.21%
1985	2,390	−0.36%
1989	2,426	+0.37%
1990	2,425	−0.04%
1991	2,373	−2.14%
1992	2,359	−0.59%
1993	2,361	+0.08%
1994	2,525	+6.95%
1995	2,702	+7.01%
1996	2,824	+4.52%

Year	Pop.	±% p.a.
1997	3,001	+6.27%
1998	3,133	+4.40%
1999	3,208	+2.39%
2000	3,301	+2.90%
2001	3,362	+1.85%
2002	3,400	+1.13%
2003	3,424	+0.71%
2004	3,395	−0.85%
2005	3,370	−0.74%
2006	3,346	−0.71%
2007	3,306	−1.20%
2008	3,270	−1.09%
2009	3,243	−0.83%
2010	3,192	−1.57%
2011	3,205	+0.41%
2012	3,197	−0.25%
2013	3,144	−1.66%
2014	3,148	+0.13%
2015	3,146	−0.06%
2016	3,145	−0.03%

== Sights ==
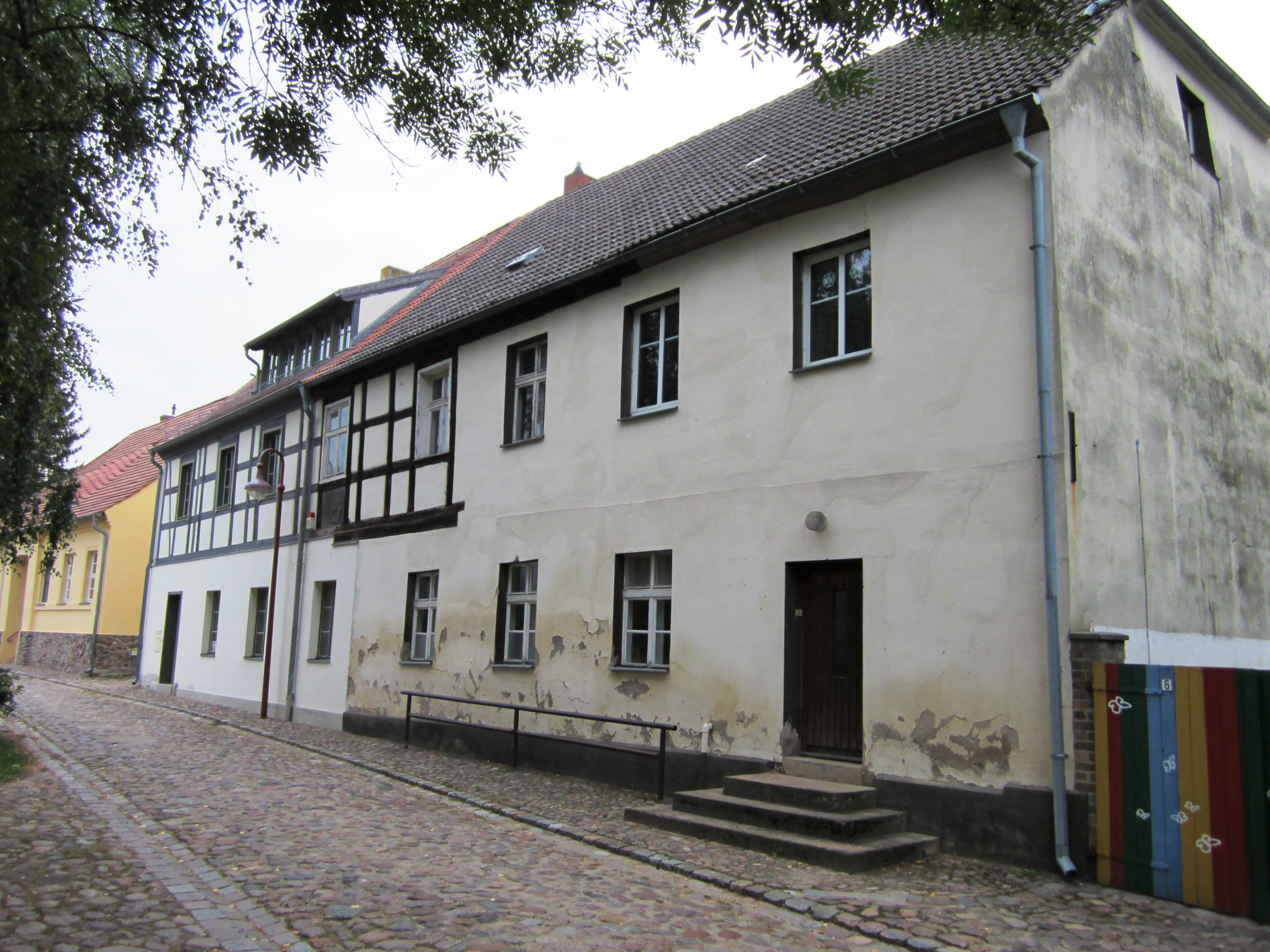
Haus Lebuser Land is a museum dedicated to the history of Lubusz Land

=== Constructed ===
The Heimatstube Lebus has information about the history and tourism sights of the town.

=== Natural ===
Nearby hills and ridges have provided natural defenses to the town for over a thousand years. The Turmberg offers a view of the Oder river valley.

== Notable people ==
- Günter Eich (1907–1972), author
