= Heinrich Grimm =

Heinrich Grimm (1592/1593-1637) was a late-Renaissance/early-Baroque German composer, cantor, music theorist, and organist.

== Career ==
Grimm was born in Holzminden in the Duchy of Braunschweig-Lüneburg. Little is known of his life before 1607, when he went to Wolfenbüttel to study with Michael Praetorius, who was the Hofkapellmeister to Duke Heinrich Julius. While some scholars have suggested that Grimm was a choirboy at the ducal court, this cannot be verified with extant sources.

Grimm studied under Praetorius until 1609, when he matriculated at the University of Helmstedt, where he studied philosophy and theology. In approximately 1617, Grimm became a cantor in Magdeburg, where his title was Musicus Magdeburgiensis Ordinarius. In this position, he taught at the Gymnasium, was music director at the churches of St. Johannes and St. Jacobi, and led a choir of his students once per month at the Magdeburg Cathedral. Grimm is credited with being one of the first to bring the new Italian style of music to northern Germany, and he was the first to introduce figured bass practice to Magdeburg.

In May 1631, Grimm and his family were forced to flee Magdeburg, which was attacked by Count Tilly in the Magdeburger Hochzeit. He escaped the Catholic forces only with the help of a Jesuit priest. From Magdeburg, he fled to Hamburg, where he briefly found employment at the St. Catharinen church. However, he was unable to find satisfactory long-term employment, and left Hamburg in search of better work.

Late in 1631, Grimm arrived in Braunschweig, where he was cordially greeted as an accomplished musician by Duke Friedrich Ulrich. From November 1631 to November 1632, he worked as a freelance composer and musician at the churches of St. Michaelis, St. Martini, and St. Katharinen. Grimm finally found permanent employment as organist at St. Andreas church in November 1632, where he was employed until shortly before his death. Grimm became ill in the spring of 1637, and resigned his post at St. Andreas. He died on 10 July that year, and was buried in the cemetery at St. Petri church in Braunschweig on 12 July.

== Works ==
Heinrich Grimm's works are cataloged using HGWV (Heinrich-Grimm-Werke-Verzeichnis) numbers assigned by Thomas Synofzik in his dissertation.
