= Brandenburgisches Staatsorchester Frankfurt (Oder) =

German symphony orchestra

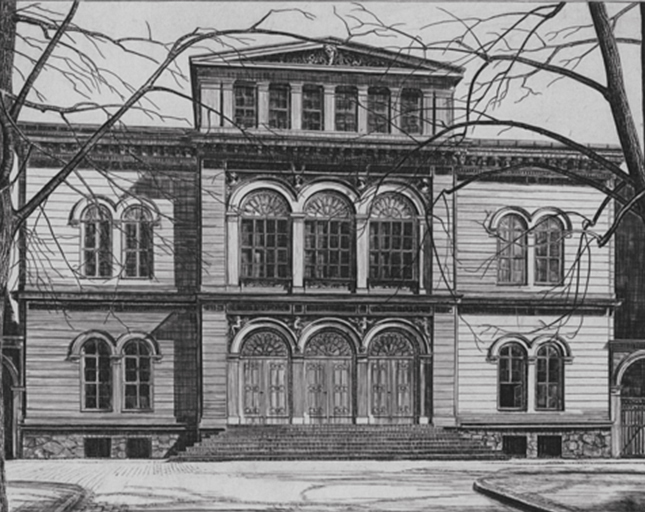
From 1840 to 1842 the orchestra was based in the Stadttheater in Frankfurt an der Oder.

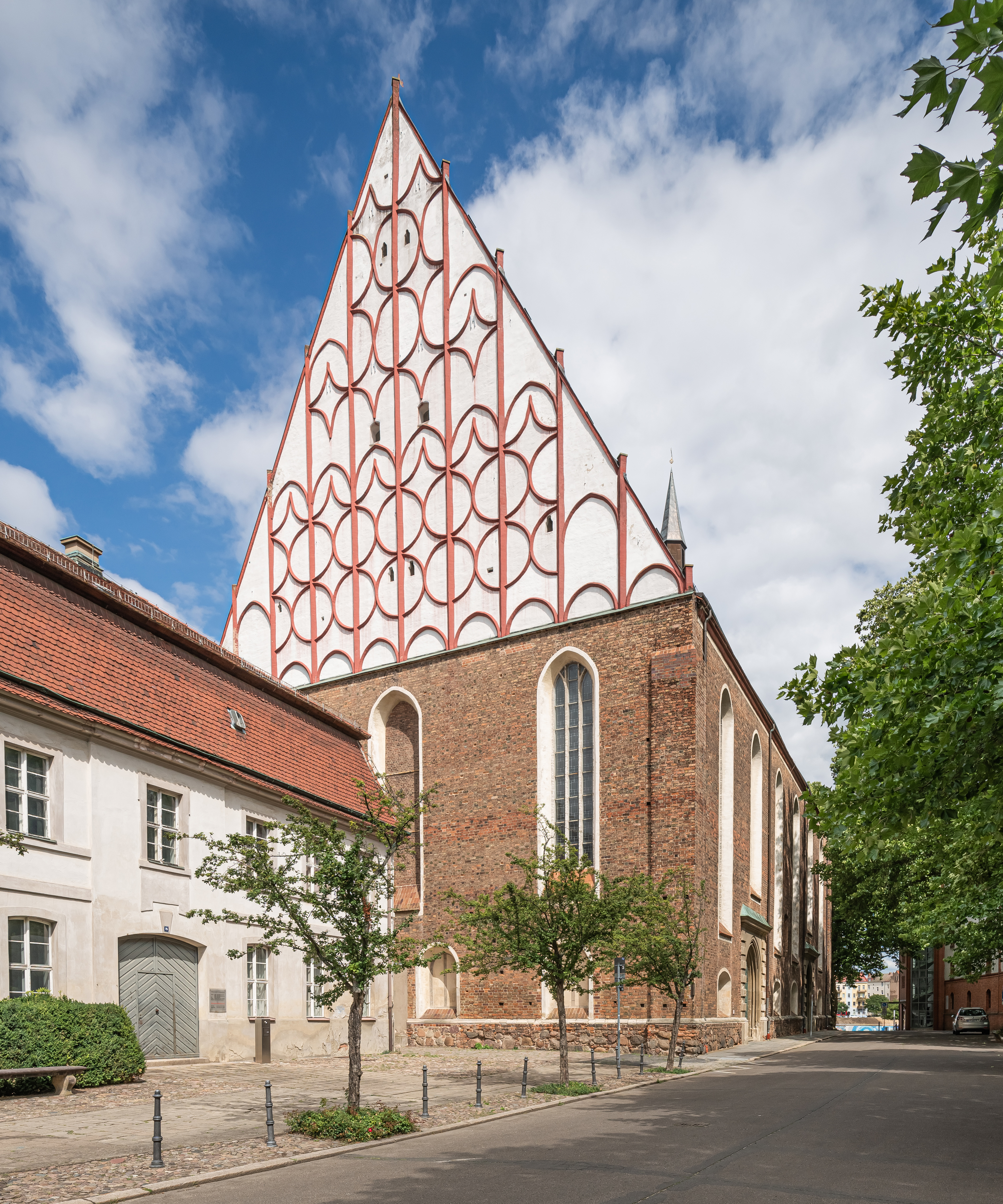
The Konzerthalle Carl Philipp Emanuel Bach Frankfurt (Oder)

The Brandenburgisches Staatsorchester Frankfurt or BSOF is a symphony orchestra based in Frankfurt (Oder) in Germany. It is the orchestra of the state of Brandenburg. From 2007 to 2019 its leader was Howard Griffiths. Since 2019 the orchestra has been under the leadership of Jörg-Peter Weigle.

== History ==
It was founded in 1842 and gave its first public appearance on 1 November that year at the opening of the Frankfurter Stadttheater (designed by Karl Friedrich Schinkel and built by Emil Flaminius at 22 Wilhelmsplatz), performing Albert Lortzing's Zar und Zimmermann. In 1871 the Philharmonischer Verein was founded, organizing three concerts a year as well as choral concerts at the Singakademie, before dissolving itself in 1895.

The theatre was destroyed during the Second World War and its ensemble and the orchestra both moved to the Musiklandheim, built in 1928-1929 by Otto Bartning - in 1952 it was renamed the Kleist-Theater. Some of the theatre's musicians founded the separate Frankfurter Kulturorchester in 1953, which was renamed the Philharmonische Orchester Frankfurt (Oder) in 1971. The orchestra made its first appearance at the Choriner Musiksommer in 1973.

== List of leaders ==
- 1971–1982 Wolfgang Bothe
- 1982–1986 Heinz Struve
- 1986–1989 Andreas Wilhelm
- 1990–2000 Nikos Athineos
- 2001–2007 Heribert Beissel
- 2007–present Howard Griffiths
