= Marienkirche, Frankfurt (Oder) =

Listed three-nave hall church in Frankfurt (Oder), Brandenburg state of Germany

Marienkirche
- St Mary's Church
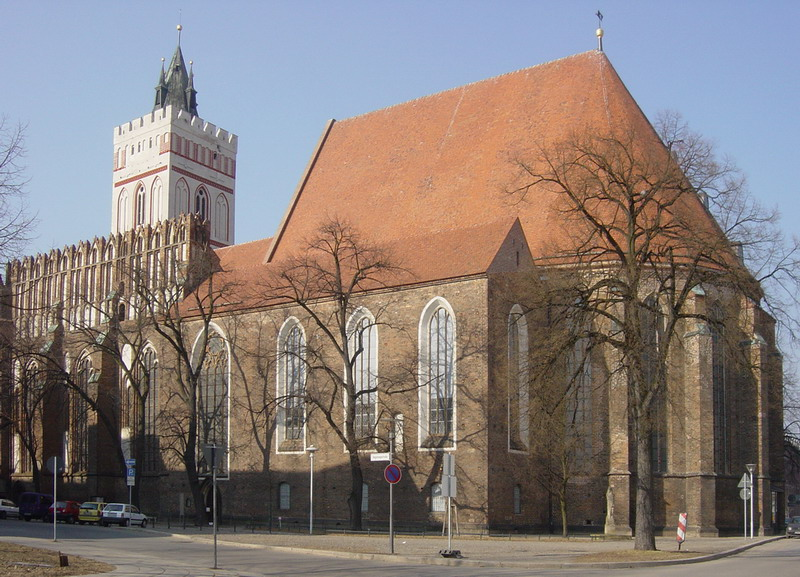
- Marienkirche
- 52.3431°N 14.5544°E
- Location: Marktplatz, Frankfurt (Oder)
- Country: Germany
- Denomination: Lutheran
- Previous denomination: Roman Catholic

Architecture
- Style: Gothic

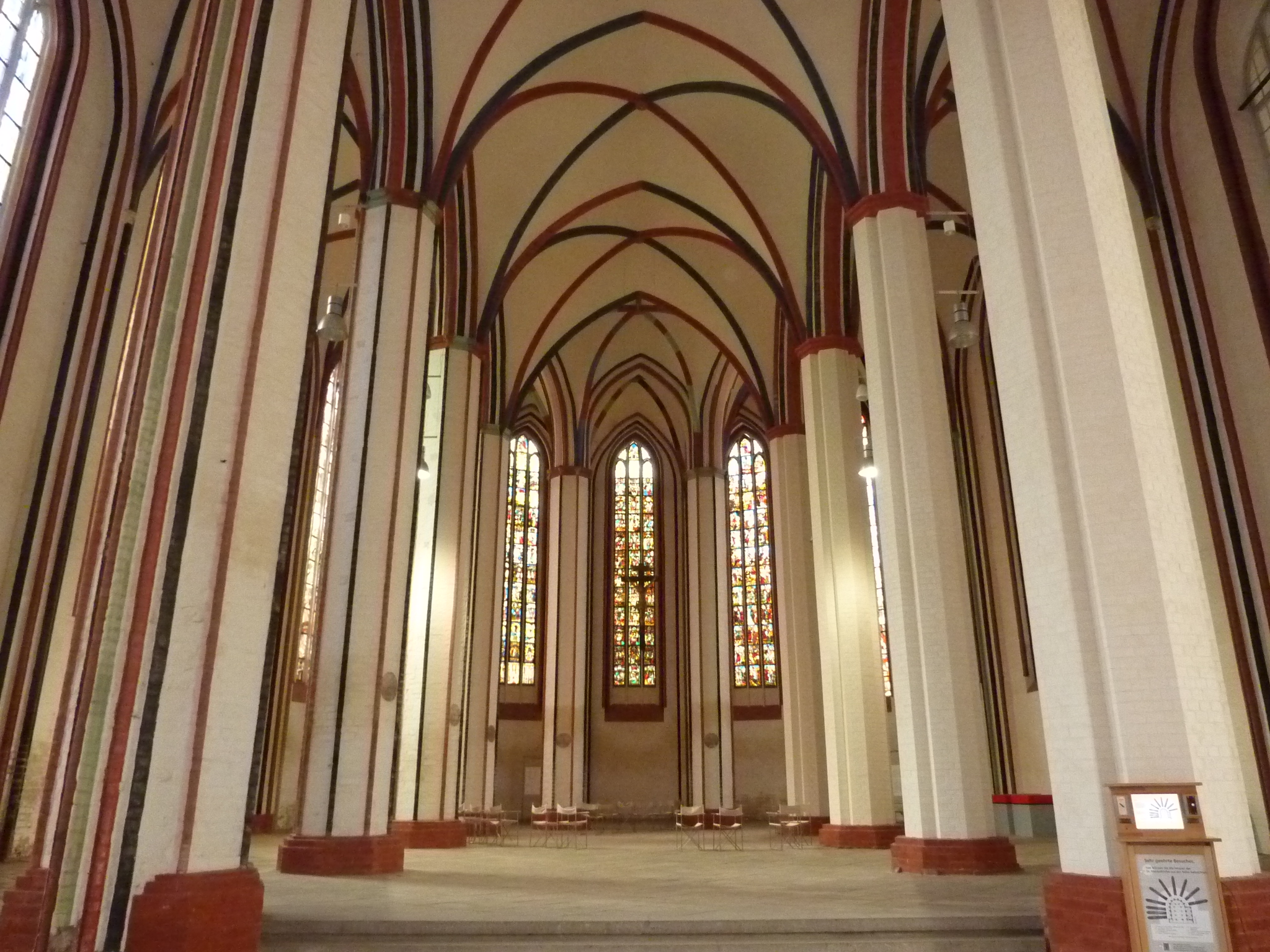
The choir of the Marienkirche

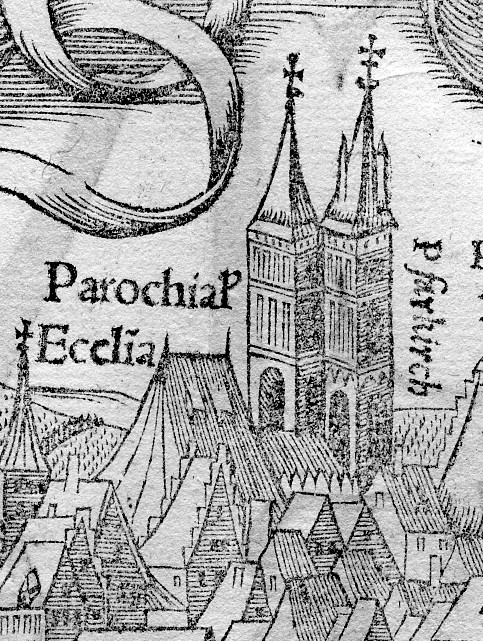
Marienkirche. Detail from a view of the city on pages 756 and 757 of the fifth edition of the Cosmographia by Sebastian Münster, 1550

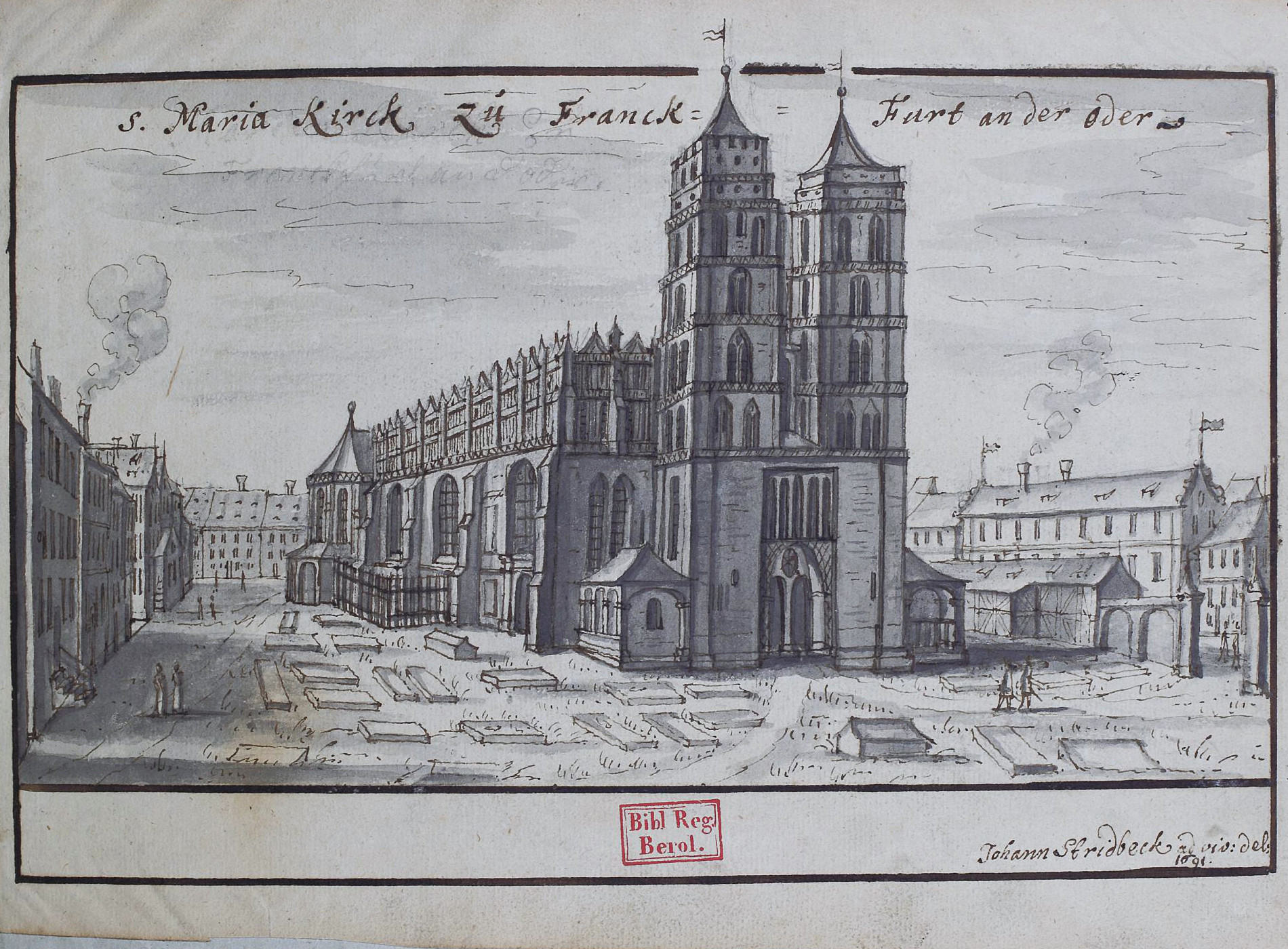
S. Maria Kirch zu Franck – Furt an der Oder. Pen and ink drawing by Johann Stridbeck the Younger, 1690

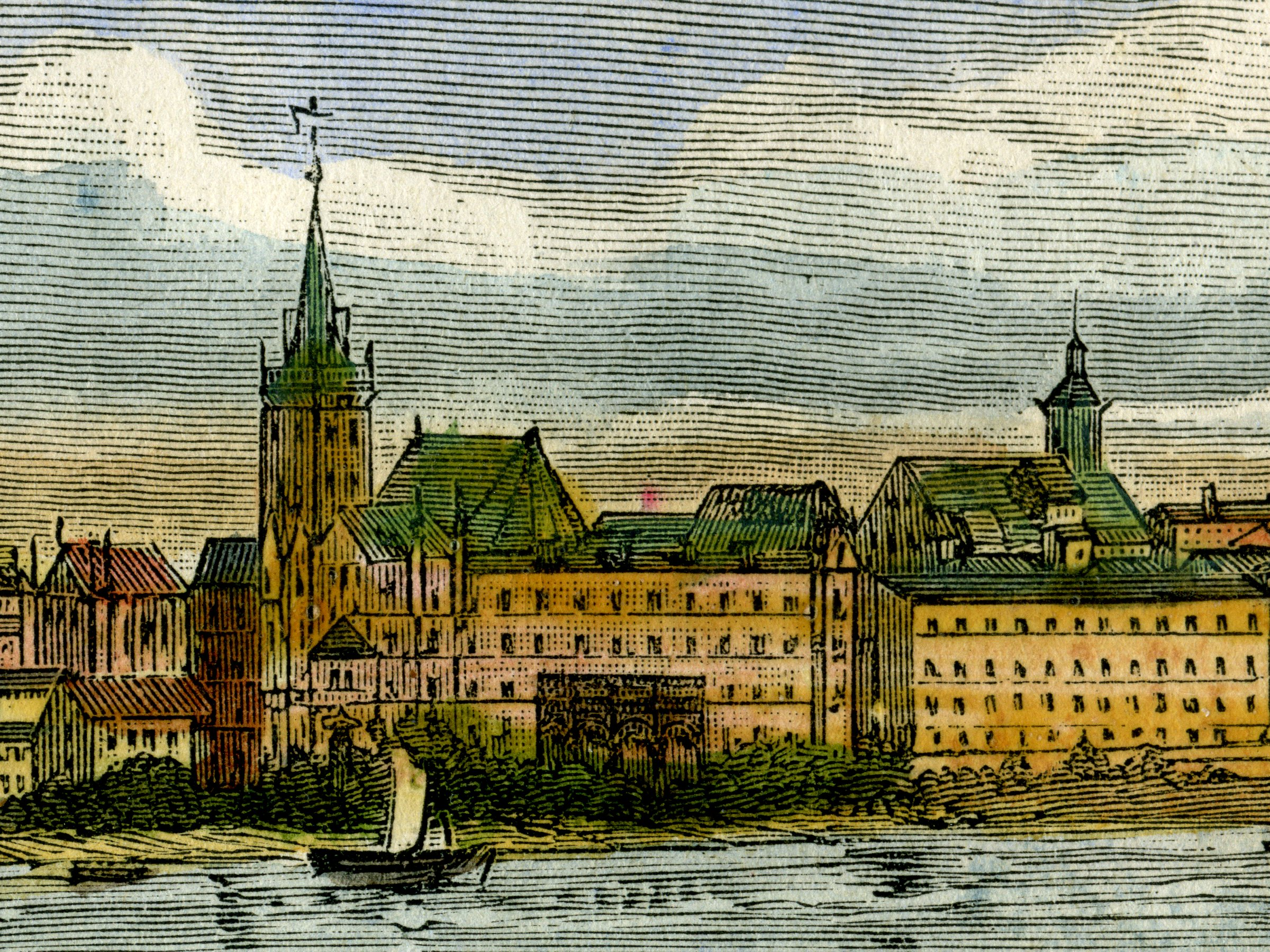
St.-Marien-Kirche in Frankfurt (Oder), c. 1860, from "L'Allemagne illustrée" by Victor Adolphe Malte-Brun

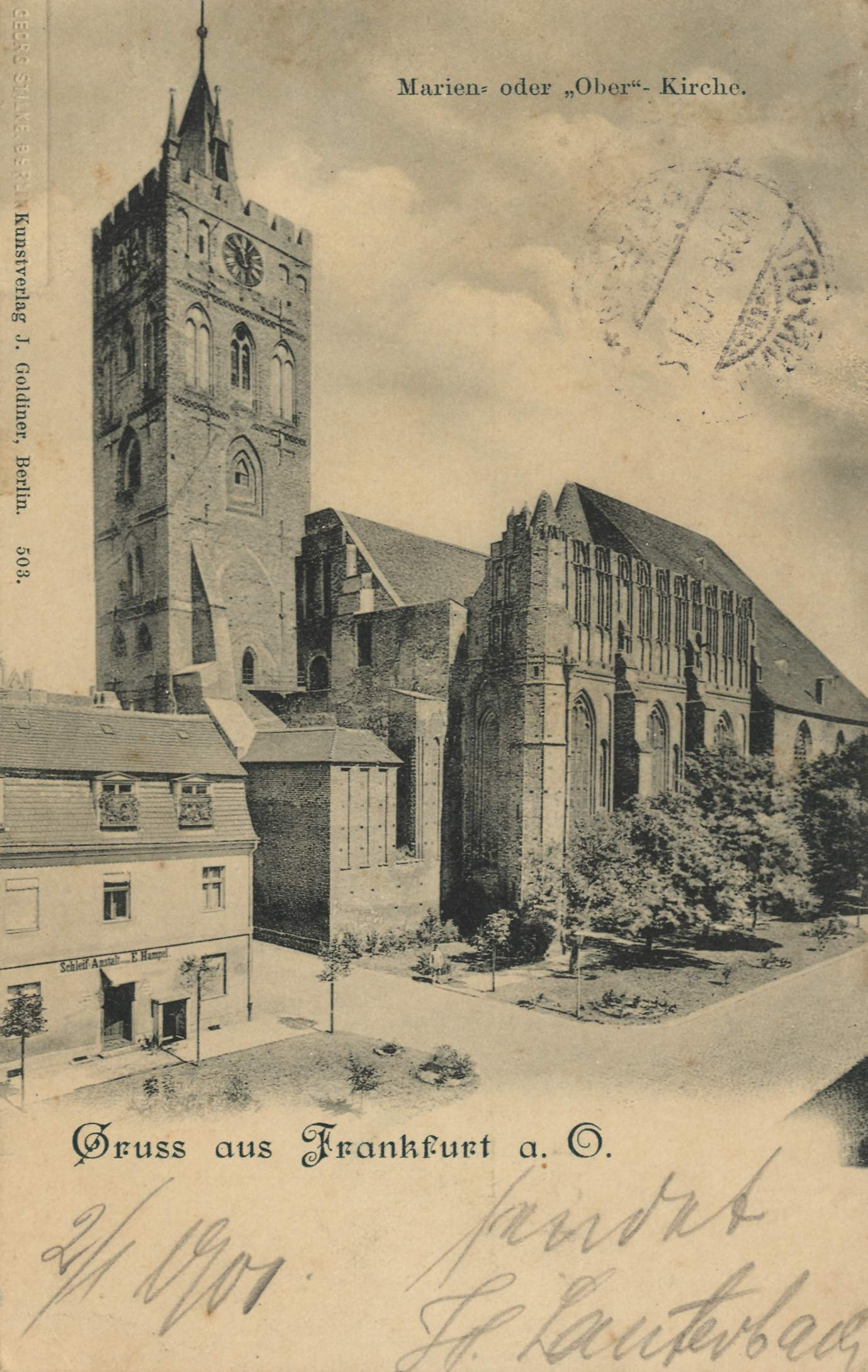
The Marienkirche in a 1900 postcard

The Marienkirche or St. Mary’s Church, Frankfurt (Oder) is a Protestant church in Frankfurt (Oder) in Germany in the Brick Gothic style. It was formerly the city's main parish church and was built over more than 250 years, during the Middle Ages.

== History ==
=== Early history ===
The church was first built in 1253, just after the foundation of the city, and was one of the earliest examples of a gallery in the architecture of the Margraviate of Brandenburg. An ambulatory hall was built to replace the original choir and a polygonal entrance hall with a sandstone entrance arch built onto the north transept, both between 1360 and 1370. The nave was expanded as a five-bayed construction in the 15th century with painted ceilings in the side bays and a 14-storey new tower façade built around 1450. An eight-pointed cupola was added to the north tower and a crenellated edge to the south tower. On the establishment of the Viadrina University a new galleried sacristy was built between 1521 and 1522 – this was the last major expansion of the building, which is now 77 metres long and 25 metres wide, making it one of the largest Brick Gothic buildings in Germany.

=== Stained glass ===
The three large surviving Gothic stained glass windows date to between 1360 and 1370 – they are made up of a total of 117 pictures, each 83 x 43 cm in size, financed by city's citizens of the city and showing the creation, the lives of Adam and Eve, Noah building his ark, Christ's life and the Book of Revelation. They were removed to another location in Frankfurt in September 1941 to protect them from bombing – there they were photographed in black and white before being moved to the New Palace in Potsdam in April 1945.

In June 1946 they were seized from Potsdam by the Soviet Military Administration in Germany and taken to the Red Army Spoils of War Camp 1 at Zentralvieh- und Schlachthof in Berlin. They were then moved to the Hermitage Museum's stores in Saint Petersburg in August 1946 and were thus considered as "lost since the end of the war". The windows' new location was first revealed in April 1991 by the Literaturnaya Gazeta. In 1994 Frankfurt's parish council petitioned the Russian prime minister Viktor Chernomyrdin for their return, leading to a law passed in the State Duma with the approval of the Federation Council in April 2002 to return the windows. They were gradually restored in a room above the church's sacristy from summer 2002 onwards, using the black and white wartime photographs.

The first of the three windows was ceremonially reinstalled on 28 May 2005. In June 2005 a message appeared in the Russian newspaper Kommersant that six missing panels from the windows were in the Pushkin Museum and after several further years of negotiations the Duma and Federation Council also decided to return these panels, handing them to the German embassy in Moscow. The German culture minister Bernd Neumann then handed them over to the parish and the city in November 2008 and the last pieces of the windows were reinstalled in the church in February 2009.

=== 1826–present ===
On 15 May 1826 the south tower of the church collapsed – Karl Friedrich Schinkel's rebuild completely walled off a Gothic display wall from the 13th century, which was only rediscovered during repairs in the 1990s. Schinkel entrusted his scheme to his pupil Emil Flaminius, although it did not include rebuilding the lost south tower. In 1945, during World War II, the church was burnt down entirely. Its sacristy and Martyrchor (Martyrs' choir) were rebuilt and the nave altar brought back into use by the parish using its own funds in 1958, but the limited heating meant services could only occur in the summer. The city council and the church signed a 99-year lease on 27 September 1974 so that it could continue using the church, with the city taking over restoration and rebuilding of the ruins for general civic purposes. This began in 1979, restoring the sacristy, and continued in 1990. The main roofs over the chancel and nave were rebuilt in 1998. Reconstruction concluded with the restoration of the original coloured façade of the north tower after colour pigments were discovered on it. Since 1980 its church furniture have been in the Sankt-Gertraud-Kirche – these include the 1489 Marienaltar, its late 14th century bronze font and bronze candlesticks and many tomb monuments and inscriptions.

The church was equipped with a 38,000 euro fire protection system in 2002. In May 2006, the road in front of the west door was repaved – historic granite stones from the civil engineering department's store and some donors' stones (each costing 75 Euros, of which 50 Euros went to the restoration fund and 25 Euros to producing the stone) were used for this purpose.
