= Emil Flaminius =

Prussian architect and master builder

Emil Karl Alexander Flaminius (1807, Küstrin - 7 October 1893, Berlin) was a Prussian architect and master builder.

== History ==
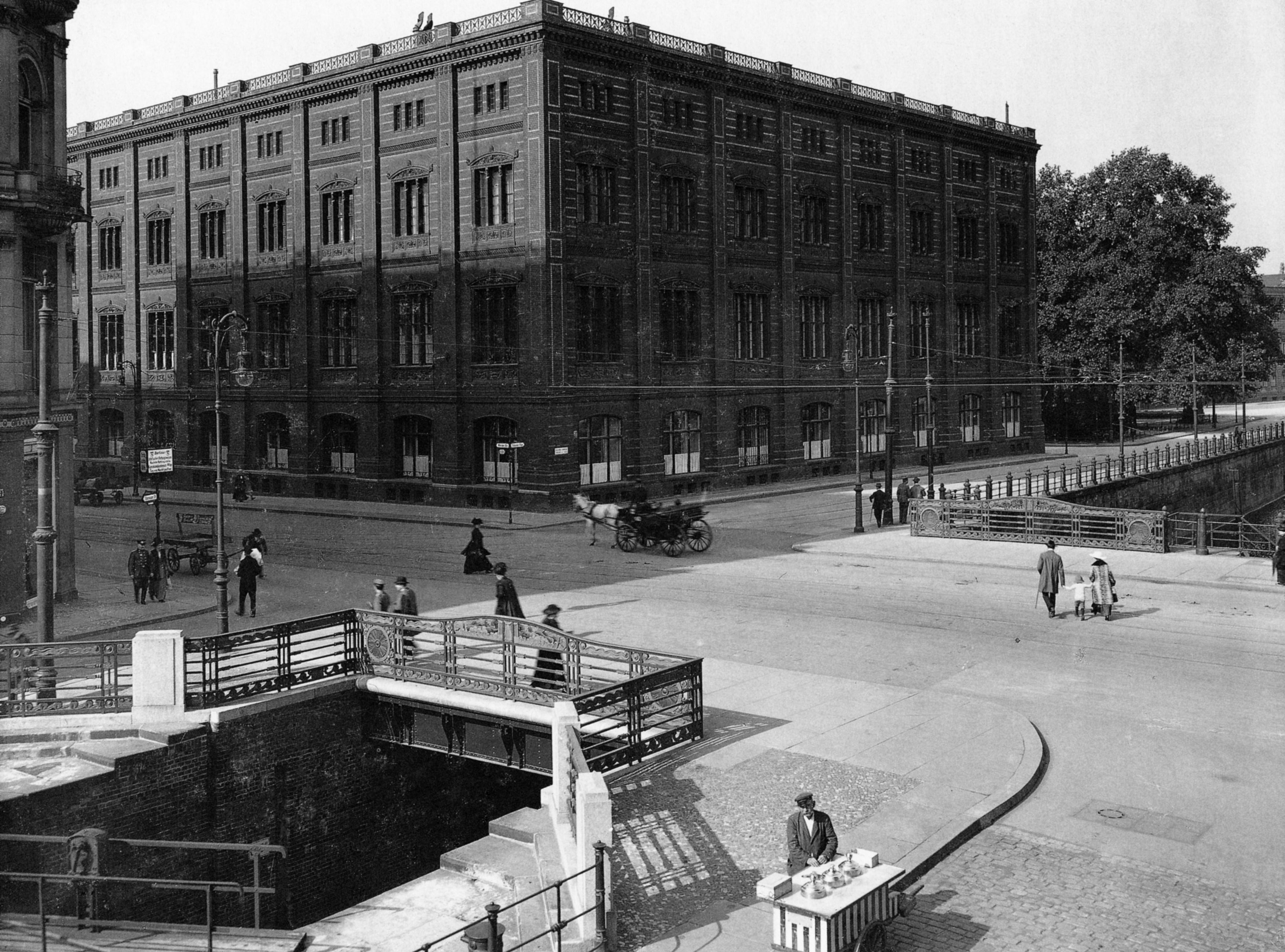
The Berliner Bauakademie on the Schleusenbrücke, 1915

Flaminius grew up in Küstrin during the Napoleonic Wars and the period of reconstruction after the departure of the Napoleonic occupying forces in 1814. For twenty years he worked on the Oder and Warthe dykes in his home town. In 1828 he moved to Berlin to study architecture at the Bauakademie, where he came into contact with Karl Friedrich Schinkel. He frequently collaborated with Schinkel in the following years and even began to implement some of Schinkel's projects whilst still studying. For example, aged only 21, he worked with Schinkel on repairing the Frankfurter Marienkirche after the collapse of its south tower - the project did not replace the south tower, but did produce one of the largest works of Brick Gothic.

Flaminius graduated from the Bauakademie in 1830, after only two years' study. Between 1832 and 1836 he worked to erect a new home for the Bauakademie, using designs by Schinkel.
