= Sankt-Gertraud-Kirche, Frankfurt (Oder) =

Coordinates: 52°20′19″N 14°33′11″E

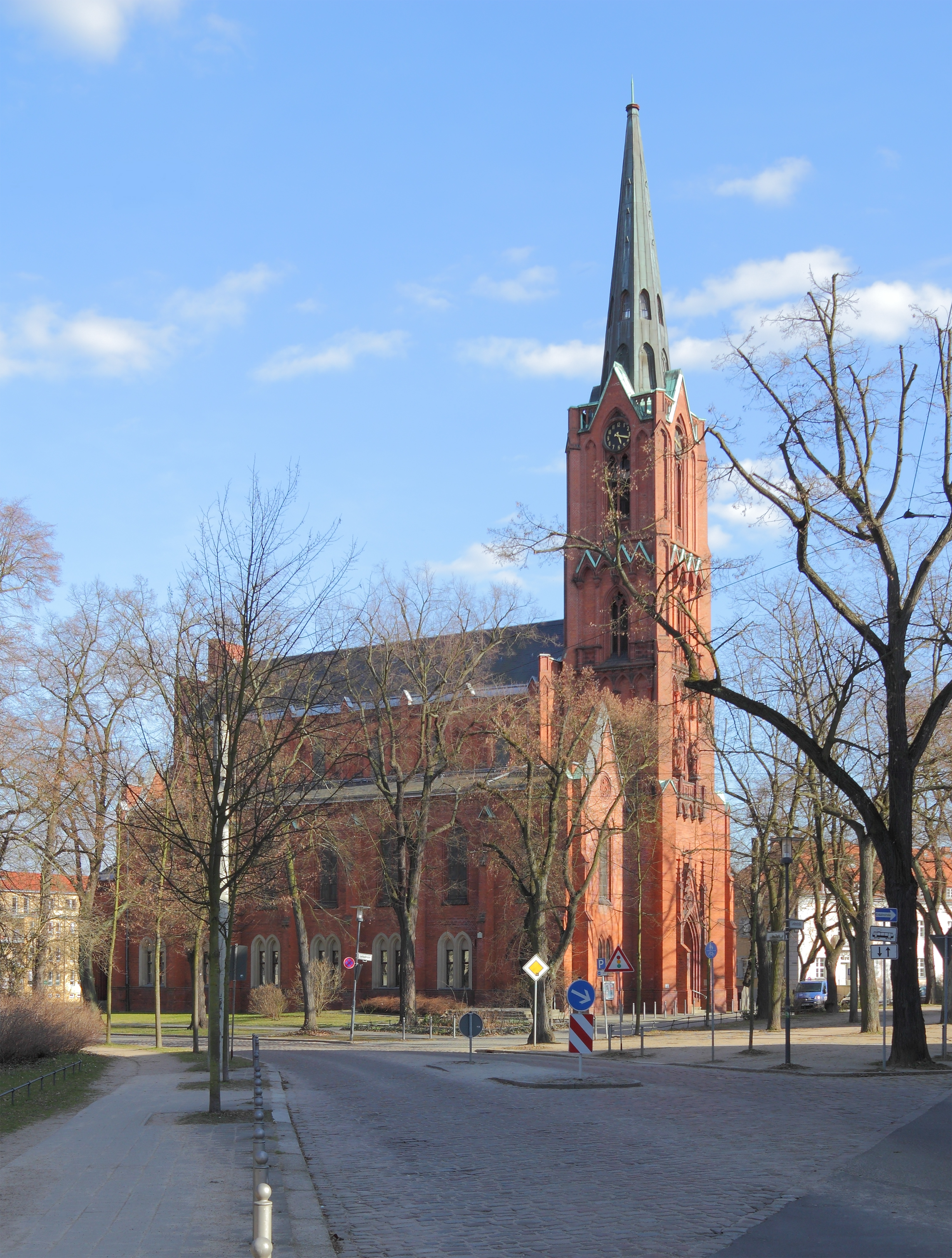
The 1878 church.

The Sankt-Gertraud-Kirche is a Protestant church in Frankfurt (Oder) in Germany. It is dedicated to Gertrude of Nivelles.

== History ==
It was first built in 1368 by the city's tailors' guild as the "St.-Gertraud-, Urban- und Theobald-Kapelle vor dem Gubener Tor" (Chapel of St Gertrude, Saint Urban and Saint Theobald before the Gubener Gate) to provide a place of worship for merchants heading south and stopping off in the city. That building and its successor stood on what is now the site of the monument to Heinrich von Kleist.

The Gubener Gate and the chapel were both destroyed by the Hussites in 1342, but the chapel was soon rebuilt and in 1539 was used as both a guild chapel and a parish church. Its parish register survives as far back as 1614, though imperial troops burned the church and its district to the ground in April 1631 just before Gustavus Adolphus's troops attacked the city during the Thirty Years War. In 1660 the church was rebuilt in the Baroque style and reconsecrated on 25 April 1662. A new altar was installed in 1670 in the late-Gothic style.

After the Napoleonic Wars the tailors' guild could no longer afford to maintain the building and responsibility for this passed to the city authorities. Before the guild's dissolution, it donated a ewer, bowl and table used for baptisms - the silver baptismal bowl is still in use. The church was dilapidated by 1822 and services moved to the Marienkirche instead during 1823 and 1856 whilst restorations were carried out. A commission was set up to build a new Sankt-Gertraud-Kirche in 1865 and construction began in 1873. The new three-aisled Neo Gothic basilica by Carl Christ and Wilhelm Kinzel was completed and consecrated on 20 December 1878, with the new organ installed the following year.

A new spire was added between 1882 and 1885, whilst general repairs removed much of the decoration and added the current peak to the spire around 1930. The church was badly damaged by artillery fire at the end of the Second World War but soon repaired and on 15 May 1949 the congregation left its temporary church and moved back into the permanent building. The parish merged with that of the Marienkirche in 1975 and a floor was put into the nave of the Sankt-Gertraud-Kirche between 1978 and 1980, creating a parish room and parish office on the lower floor and a worship space on the new upper floor. Since 1980 the worship space has also housed the medieval altar, bronze font, seven-branched candlestick and several inscriptions.

== Sources ==
- http://ns.gis-bldam-brandenburg.de/hida4web/view?docId=obj09110161.xml
