= Johann Stridbeck the Younger =

German draughtsman, engraver and publisher

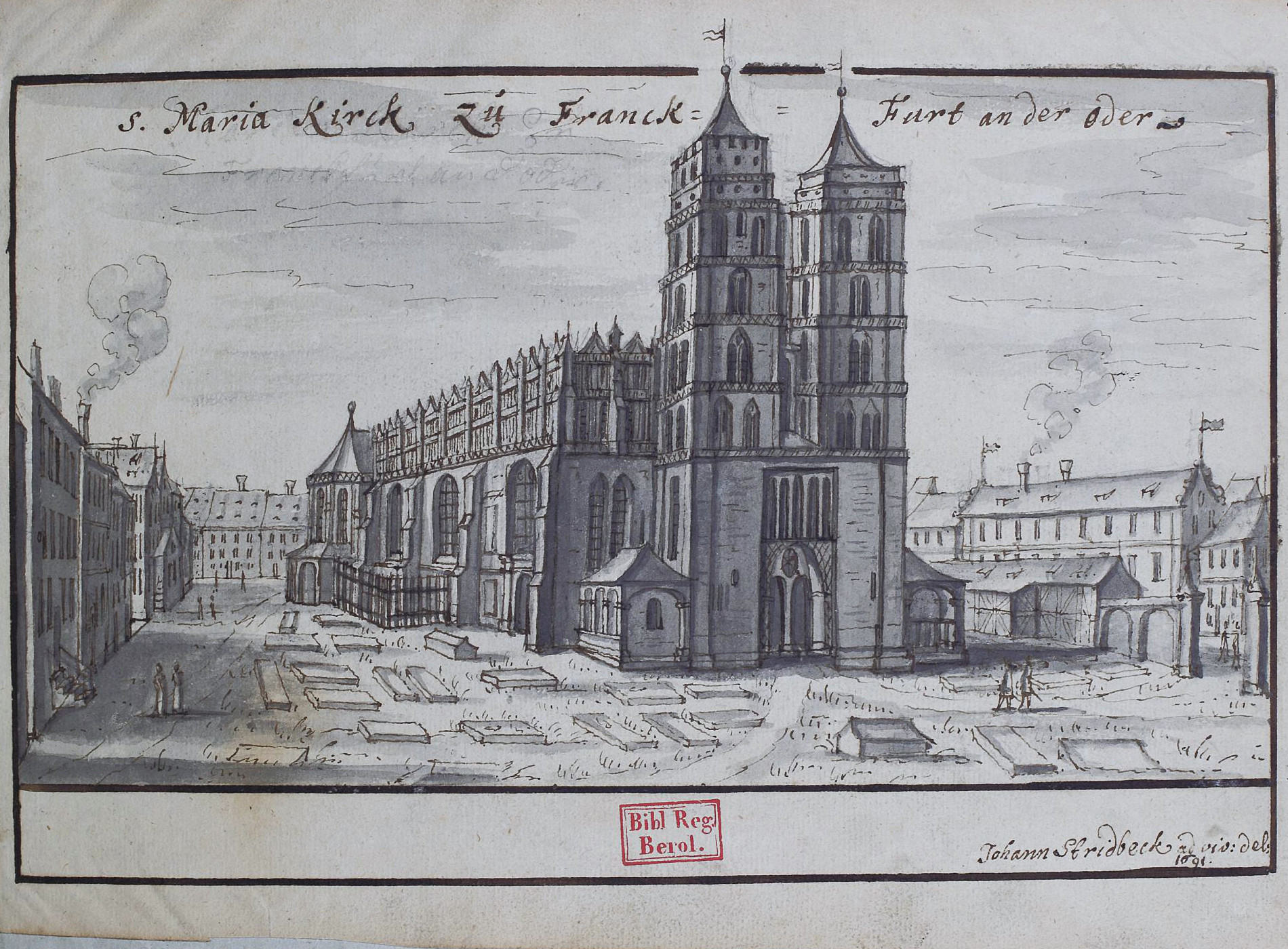
S. Maria Kirch zu Franck - Furt an der Oder - a pen and ink drawing by Johann Stridbeck the Younger, 1690

Johann Stridbeck the Younger (1665, in Augsburg – 19 December 1714, in Augsburg) was a German draughtsman, engraver and publisher. He trained under his father, the engraver and publisher Johann Stridbeck the Elder (died 1716).
