= Church of Our Lady, Sławno =

Church building in Sławno, Poland

Coordinates: 54.3625°N 16.679444°E

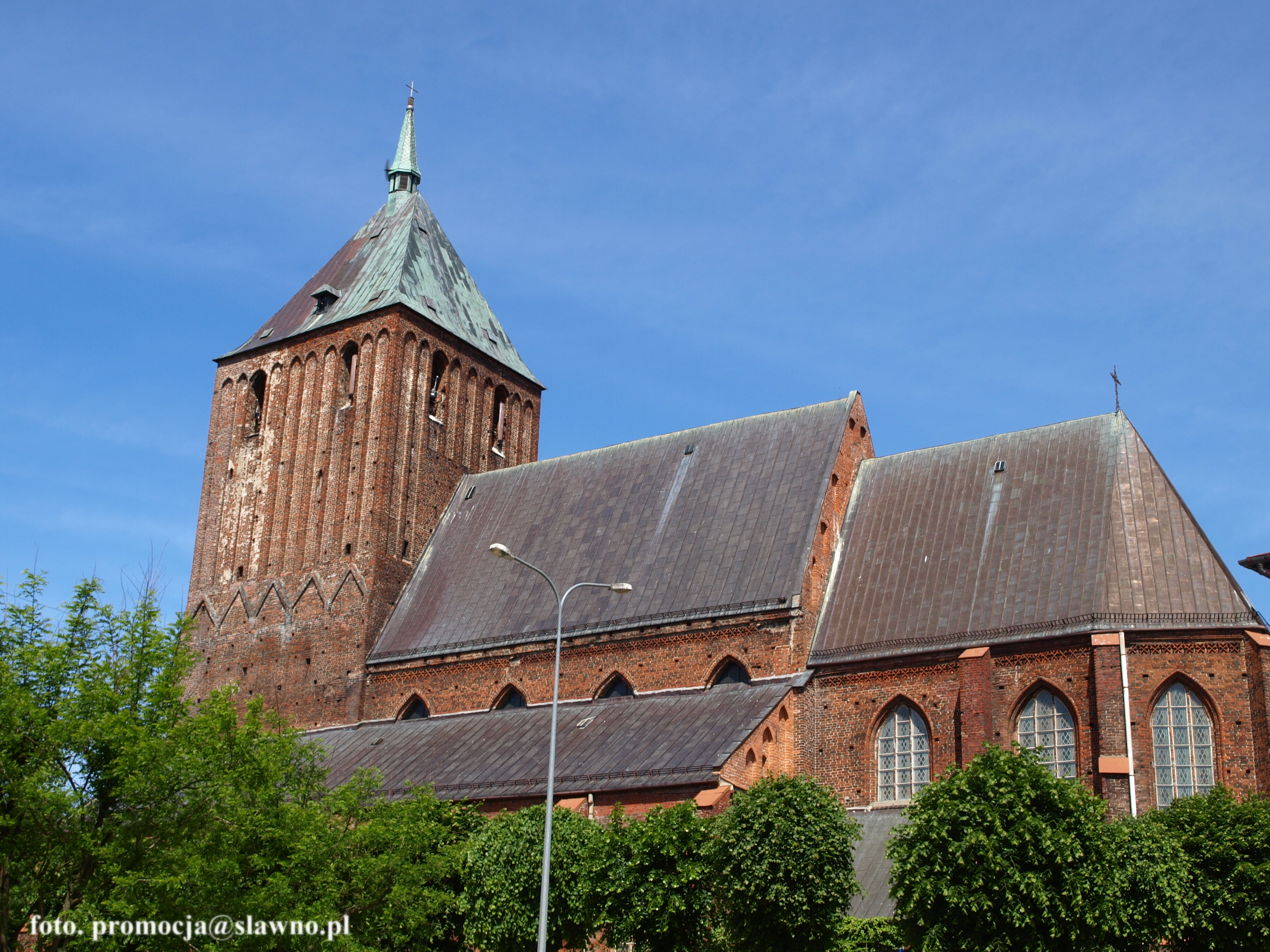
The Church of the Holy Virgin Mary in Sławno

The Church of Our Lady is the oldest church in the town of Sławno in Poland. Initially named simply the Church of Our Lady (Polish: kościół pw. Panny Marii, literally "Mary the Virgin's Church") it was later renamed after John the Baptist before being renamed to its current vocation of the Church of the Assumption of the Blessed Virgin Mary (Polish: Kościół pod wezwaniem Wniebowzięcia Najświętszej Maryi Panny).

The Brick Gothic church was constructed between 1326 and 1364 by Duchess Zofia, the consort of Barnim IV, Duke of Pomerania. Initially the church was owned by the Joannites. In the late 15th century the church was refurbished and soon afterwards received an early Renaissance altarpiece. Since the 16th century the church served a local Protestant community. The church was destroyed by the Red Army after the town of Sławno had been captured on 7 March 1945, during World War II. Among the pieces destroyed by Soviet soldiers was the altar and its altarpiece. Rebuilt between 1947 and 1967, the church was given back to the Catholic Franciscan Friars. Currently it is used by one of two Catholic parishes in Sławno.

== See also ==
- Brick Gothic
