= Schleusen Bridge =

Schleusen Bridge Schleusenbrücke
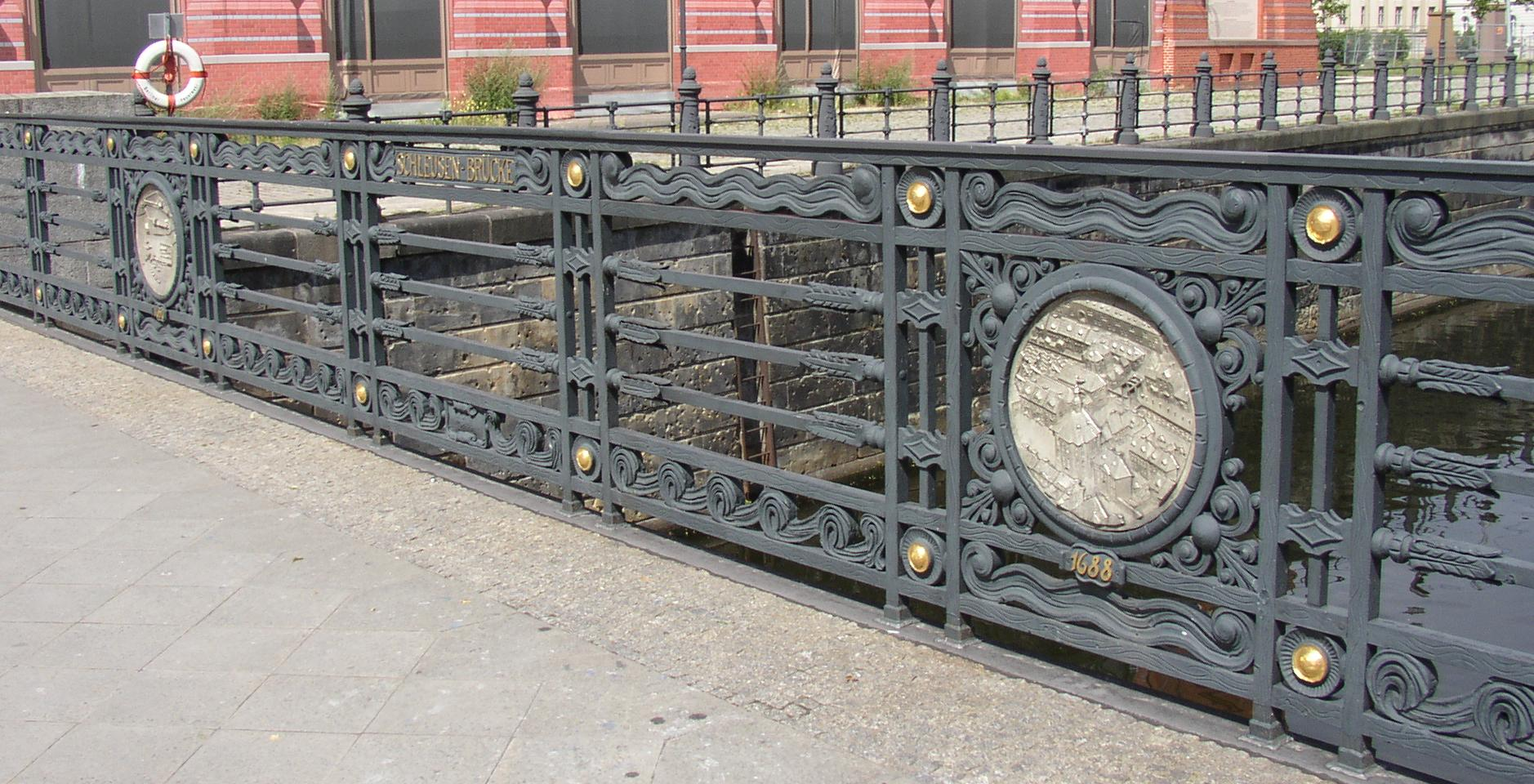
- The bridge in 2007
- Coordinates: 52°30′57″N 13°23′59″E
- Locale: Mitte, Berlin

Location
- Interactive map of Schleusen Bridge

Schleusen Bridge (German: Schleusenbrücke) is a bridge in Mitte, Berlin, Germany.
