= Singakademie Frankfurt (Oder) =

Choir from Frankfurt (Oder)

The Singakademie Frankfurt (Oder) is a choir in Frankfurt (Oder) in Germany. It was founded in 1975, though its origins lie in the "Singegesellschaft in Frankfurt a. d. Oder" choral association founded in 1815, which was renamed the "Singakademie" in 1870 and survived until May 1945.

== Sources ==
- http://www.singakademie-ffo.de/
