= Löcknitz Castle =

Medieval castle in Germany

Coordinates: 53°27′12″N 14°12′16″E

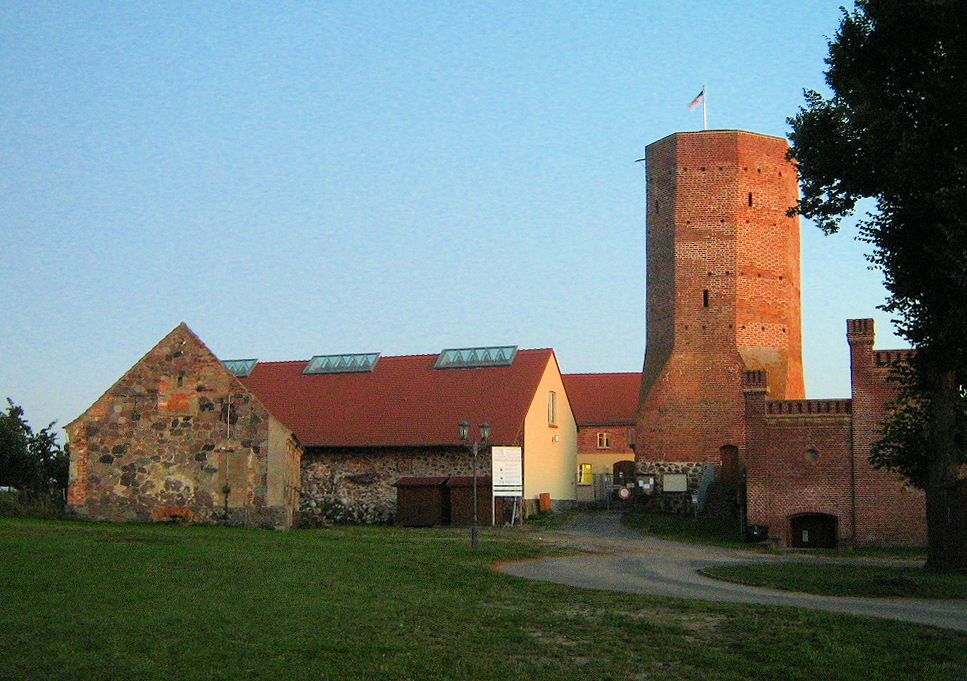

Löcknitz Castle is a castle in the municipality of Löcknitz in southeastern Mecklenburg-Western Pomerania, of which today only remnants, such as the octagonal keep are obtained. Loecknitz Castle dates back 1212.
