= Brick Gothic =

Architectural style of Northern Europe

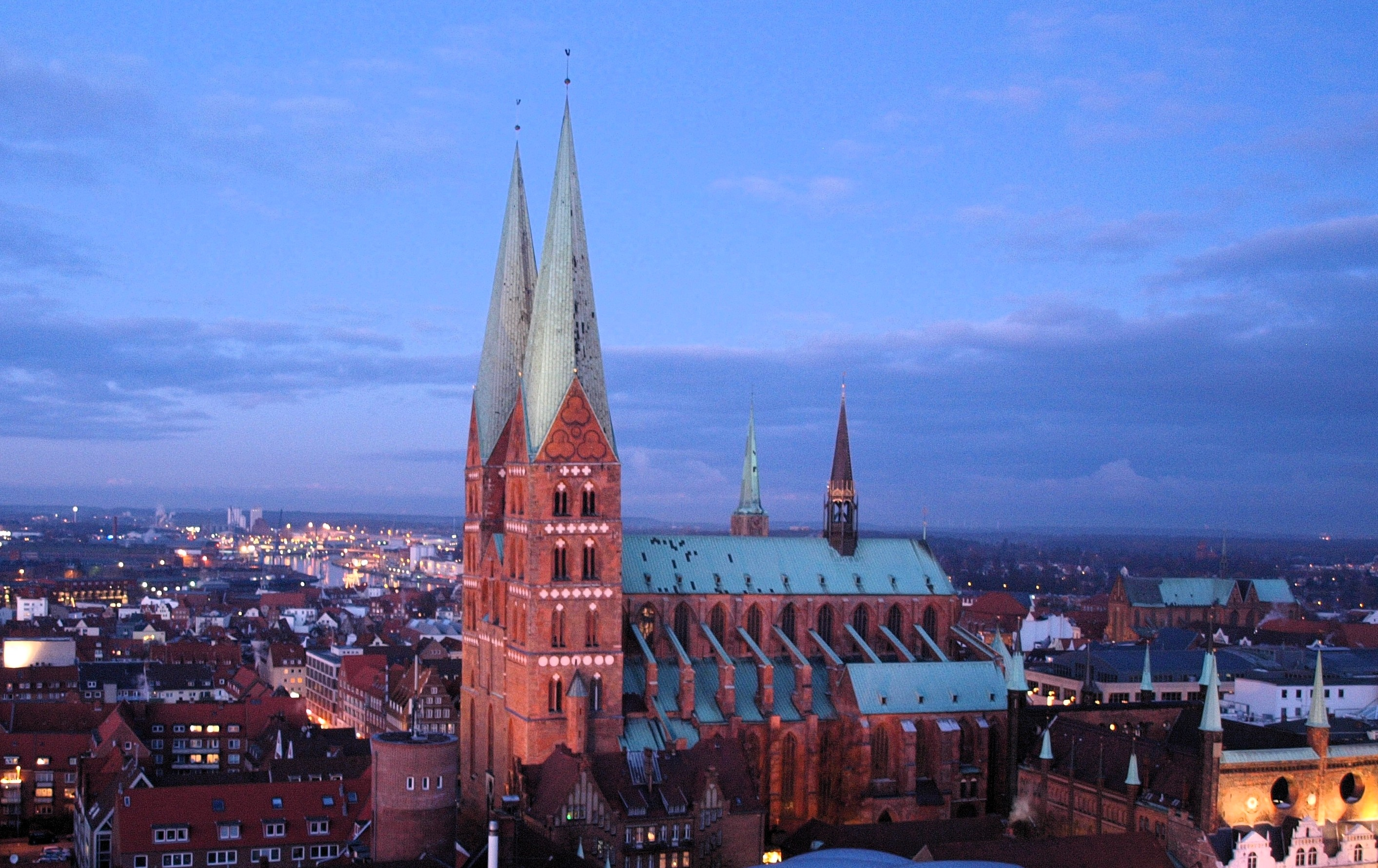
St. Mary's Church in Lübeck, Germany, with red and varnished brick, edges of granite and cornices of limestone

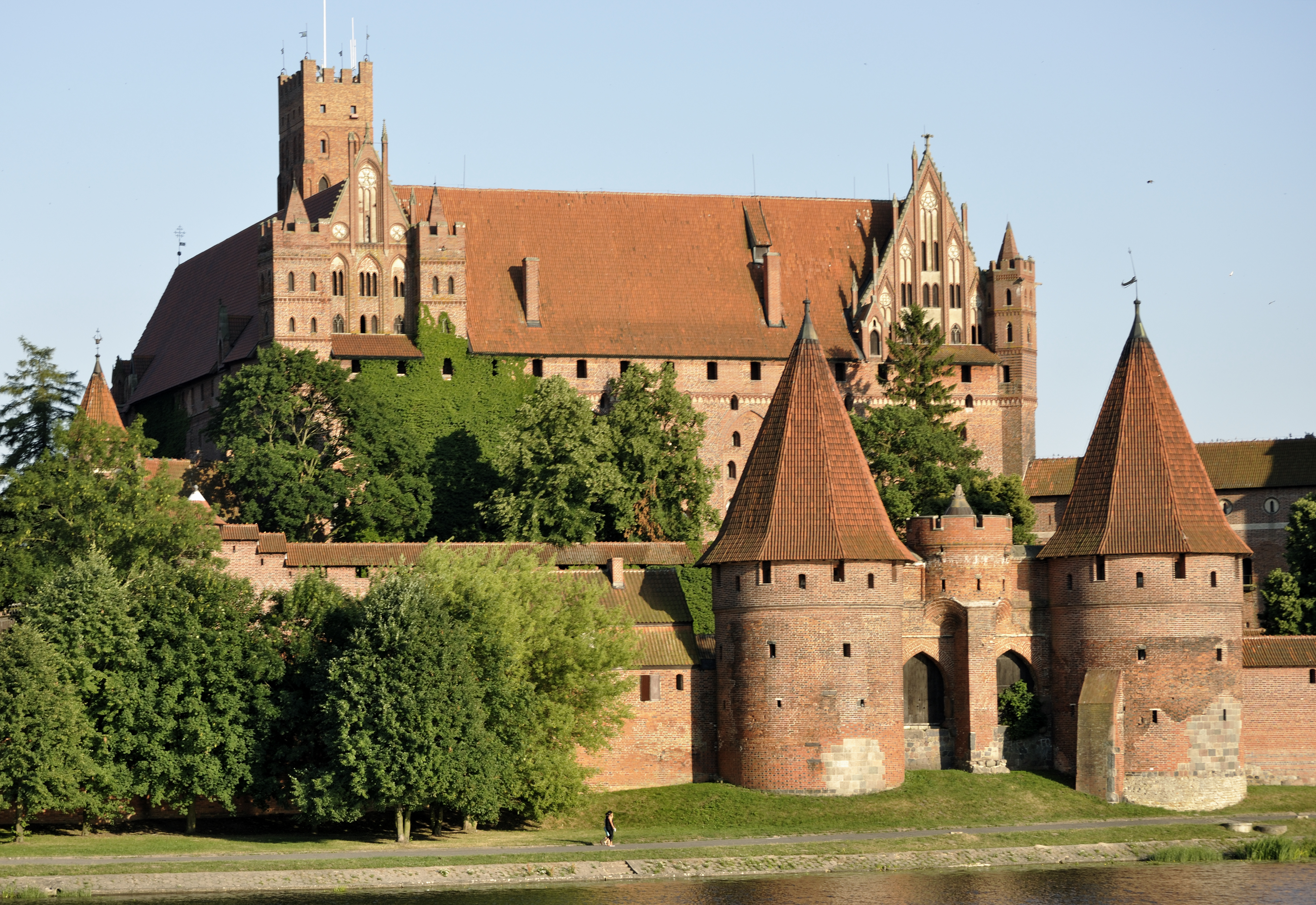
Malbork Castle in Poland is Europe's largest medieval Brick Gothic complex

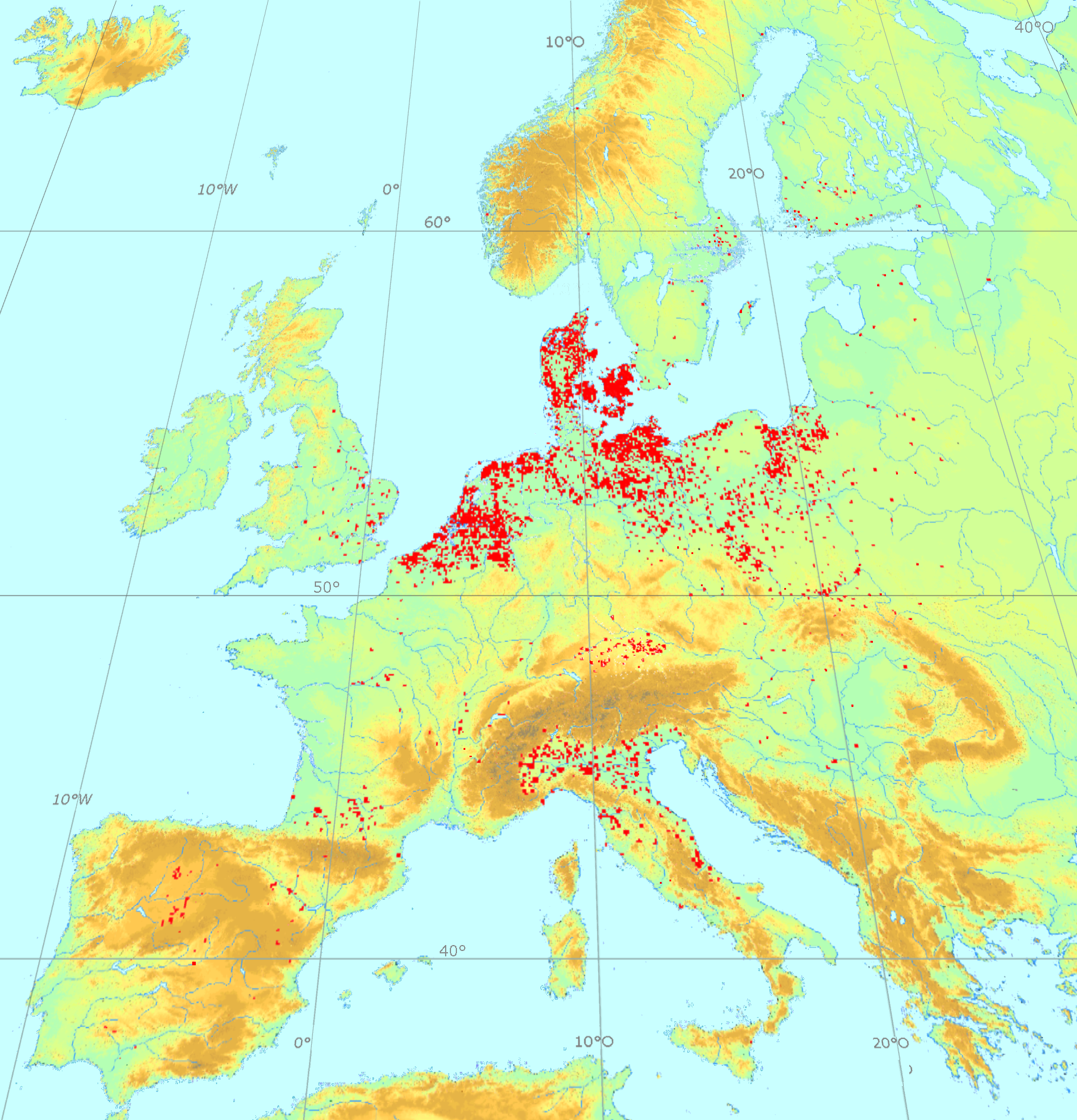
Geography of Brick Gothic architecture in Europe

Brick Gothic (German: Backsteingotik, Polish: Gotyk ceglany, Dutch: Baksteengotiek) is a specific style of Gothic architecture common in Northeast and Central Europe especially in the regions in and around the Baltic Sea, which do not have resources of standing rock (though glacial boulders are sometimes available). The buildings are essentially built using bricks. Buildings classified as Brick Gothic (using a strict definition of the architectural style based on the geographic location) are found in Belgium (and the very north of France), Netherlands, Germany, Poland, Lithuania, Latvia, Estonia, Kaliningrad (former East Prussia), Switzerland, Denmark, Sweden and Finland.

As the use of baked red brick arrived in Northwestern and Central Europe in the 12th century, the oldest such buildings are classified as the Brick Romanesque. In the 16th century, Brick Gothic was superseded by Brick Renaissance architecture.

Brick Gothic is marked by lack of figurative architectural sculpture, widespread in other styles of Gothic architecture. Typical for the Baltic Sea region is the creative subdivision and structuring of walls, using built ornaments to contrast between red bricks, glazed bricks and white lime plaster. Nevertheless, these characteristics are neither omnipresent nor exclusive. Many historic structures and districts dominated by Brick Gothic have been listed as UNESCO World Heritage sites.

About a quarter of medieval Gothic brick architecture is standing in the Netherlands, in Flanders and in French Flanders. Some of these buildings are in a combination of brick and stone. The towers of St Mary's church in Lübeck, the most significant Brick Gothic church of the Baltic Sea region, have corners of granite ashlar. Many village churches in northern Germany and Poland have a Brick Gothic design despite the main constituent of their walls being boulders.

== Brick Gothic architecture ==
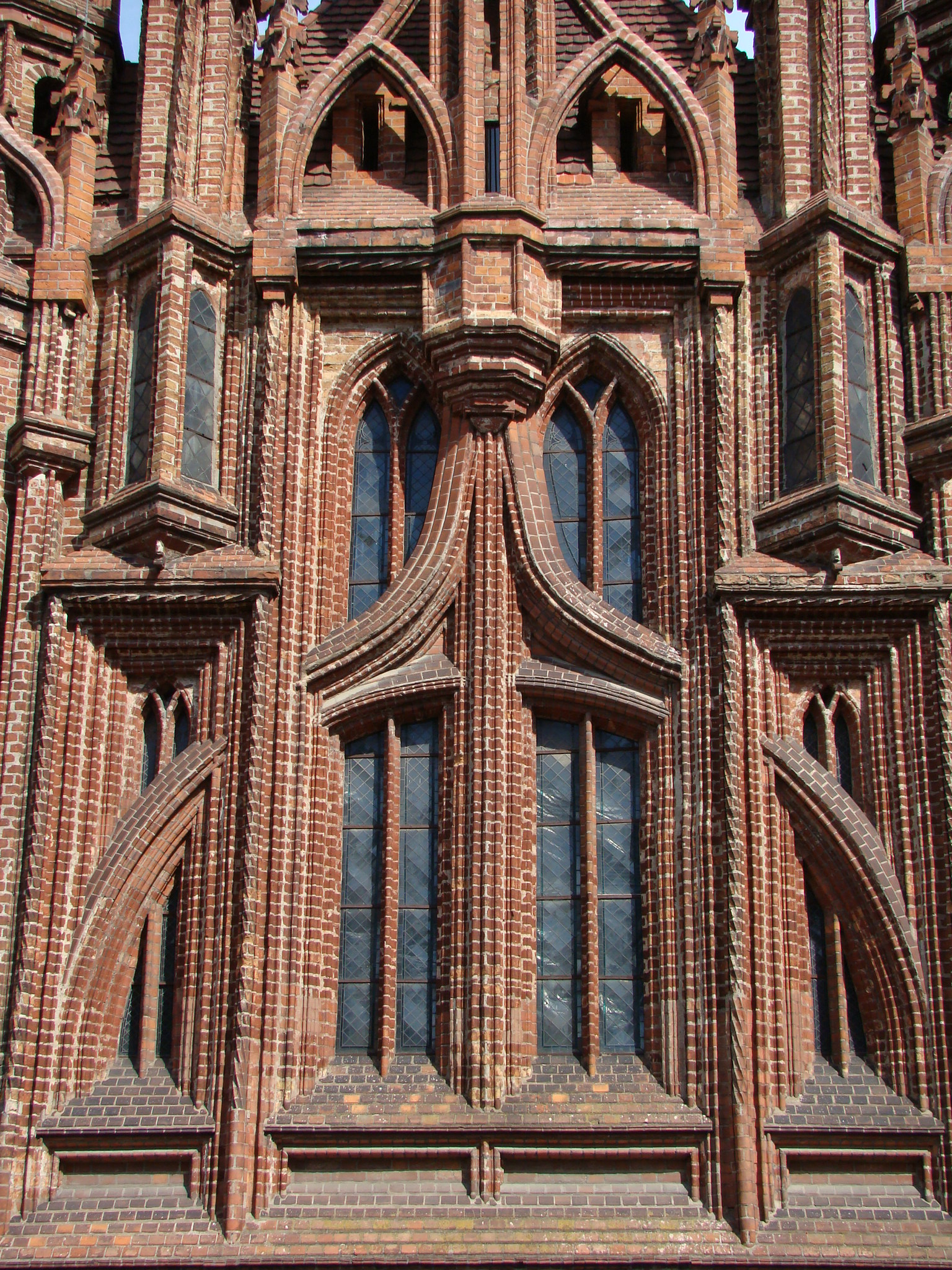
St. Anne Church detail, Vilnius, Lithuania

In contrast to other styles, the definition of Brick Gothic is based on the material (brick), and a geographical area (countries around the Baltic Sea). In addition, there are more remote regions with brick buildings bearing characteristics of this architectural style further south, east and west—these include Bavaria, and western Ukraine and Belarus, along with eastern England and the southern tip of Norway.

== Historical conditions ==
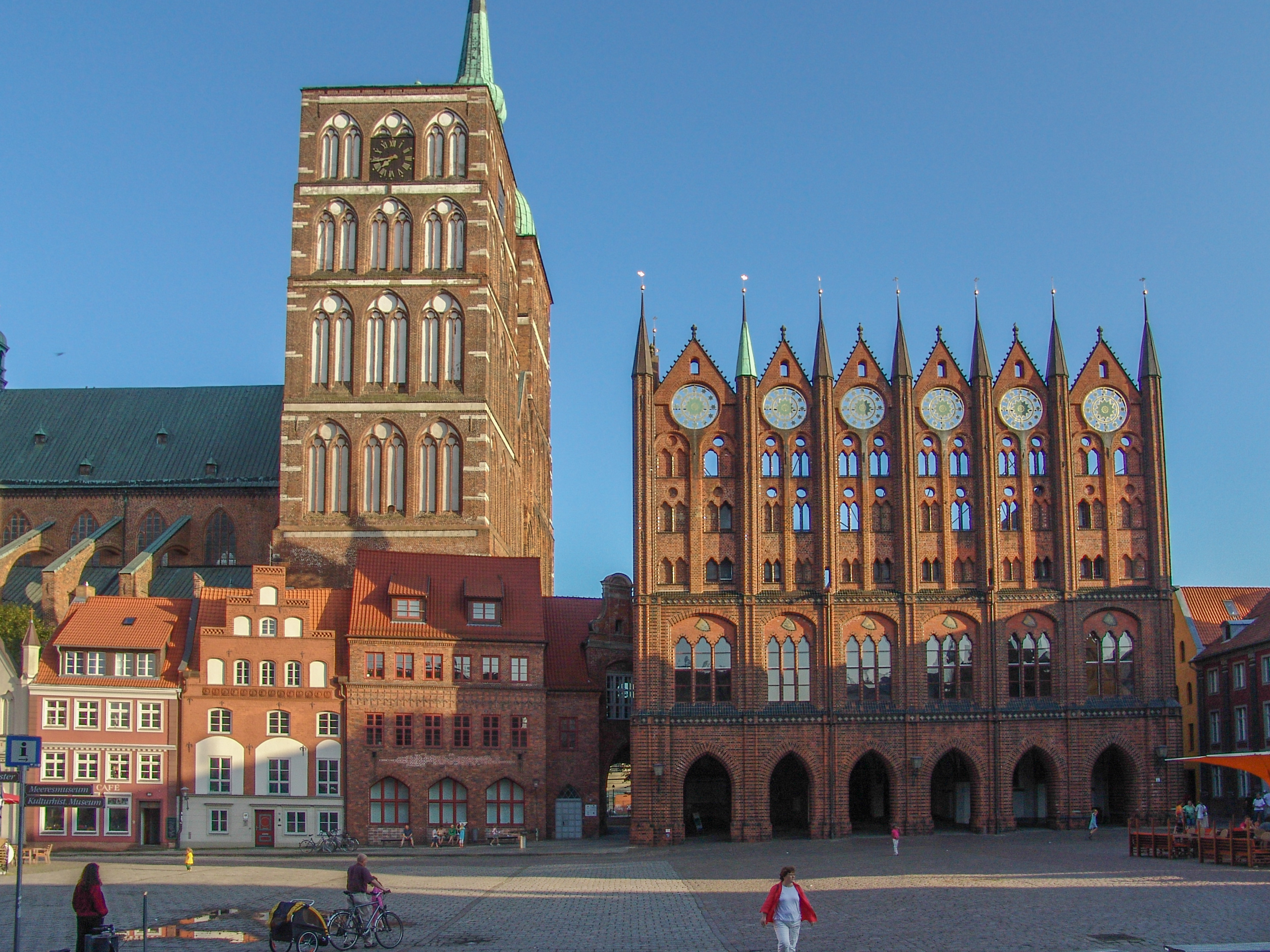
Town Hall and St. Nicholas' church in Stralsund, Germany

In the course of the medieval German eastward expansion, Slavic areas east of the Elbe were settled by traders and colonists from the overpopulated Northwest of Germany in the 12th and 13th centuries. In 1158, Henry the Lion founded Lübeck, in 1160 he conquered the Slavic principality of Schwerin. This partially violent colonisation was accompanied by the Christianisation of the Slavs and the foundation of dioceses at Ratzeburg, Schwerin, Cammin, Brandenburg and elsewhere.

The newly founded cities soon joined the Hanseatic League and formed the "Wendic Circle", with its centre at Lübeck, and the "Gotland-Livland Circle", with its main centre at Tallinn (Reval). The affluent trading cities of the Hansa were characterised especially by religious and secular representative architecture, such as council or parish churches, town halls, Bürgerhäuser, i.e. the private dwellings of rich traders, or city gates. In rural areas, the monastic architecture of monks' orders had a major influence on the development of brick architecture, especially through the Cistercians and Premonstratensians. Between Prussia and Estonia, the Teutonic Knights secured their rule by erecting numerous Ordensburgen (castles), most of which were also brick-built.

In the regions along the southern coast of the Baltic Sea, the use of brick arrived almost at the same time as the art of masonry. But in Denmark, especially Jutland, in the Frisian regions, in present-day Netherlands and in the Lower Rhine region, many high-quality medieval stone buildings were built before the first medieval brick was burnt there. Nevertheless, these regions eventually developed a density of Gothic brick architecture as high as in the regions near the southern coast of the Baltic Sea. The central and southern regions of Poland also had some important early stone buildings, especially the famous round churches. Many of these buildings were later enlarged or replaced using brick in a Gothic style. Especially in Flanders, the Netherlands, the lower Rhine region, Lesser Poland and Upper Silesia, Brick Gothic buildings often, but not always, have some elements of stone ashlar. In the Netherlands it was mostly tufa, in Denmark old squared granite and new limestone. On the other hand, in many regions regarded as typical for Brick Gothic, boulders were cheaper than brick, and therefore many buildings were erected using boulders, and only decorated by brick, all through the period of Gothic architecture.

=== Development ===
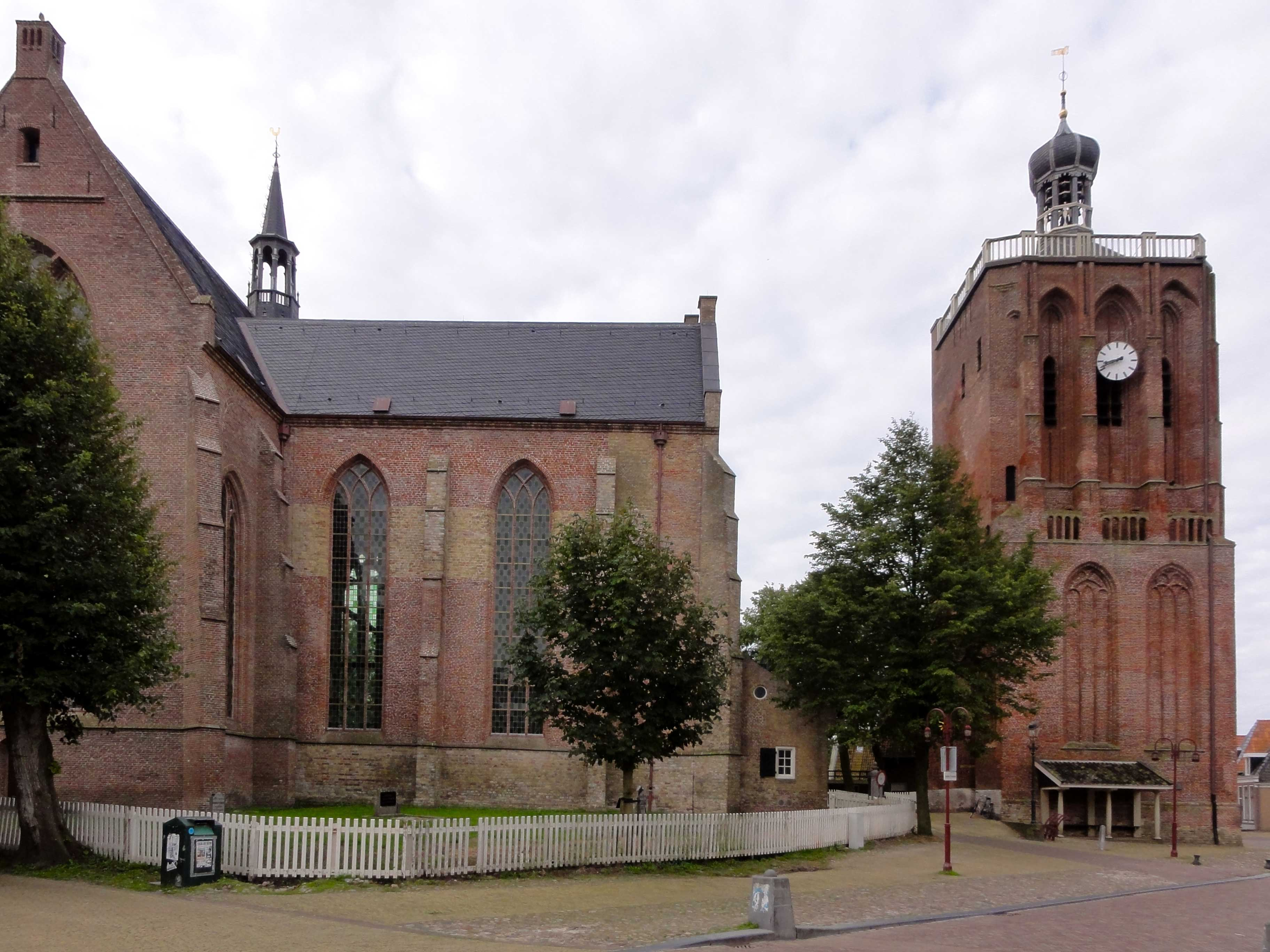
Church of Workum in the province of Friesland is an example of Brick Gothic in the Netherlands

Brick building became prevalent in the 12th century, still within the Romanesque architecture period. Wooden architecture had long dominated in northern Germany but was inadequate for the construction of monumental structures. Throughout the area of Brick Gothic, half-timbered architecture remained typical for smaller buildings, especially in rural areas, well into modern times.

The techniques of building and decorating in bricks were imported from Lombardy. Also some decorative forms of Lombard architecture were adopted.

In the areas dominated by the Welfs, the use of brick to replace natural stone began with cathedrals and parish churches at Oldenburg (Holstein), Segeberg, Ratzeburg, and Lübeck. Henry the Lion laid the foundation stone of the Cathedral in 1173.

In the Margraviate of Brandenburg, the lack of natural stone and the distance to the Baltic Sea (which, like the rivers, could be used for transporting heavy loads) made the need for alternative materials more pressing. Brick architecture here started with the Cathedral of Brandenburg, begun in 1165 under Albert the Bear. Jerichow Monastery (then a part of the Archbishopric of Magdeburg), where construction started as early as 1149, was a key influence on Brick Gothic in Brandenburg.

== Characteristics ==
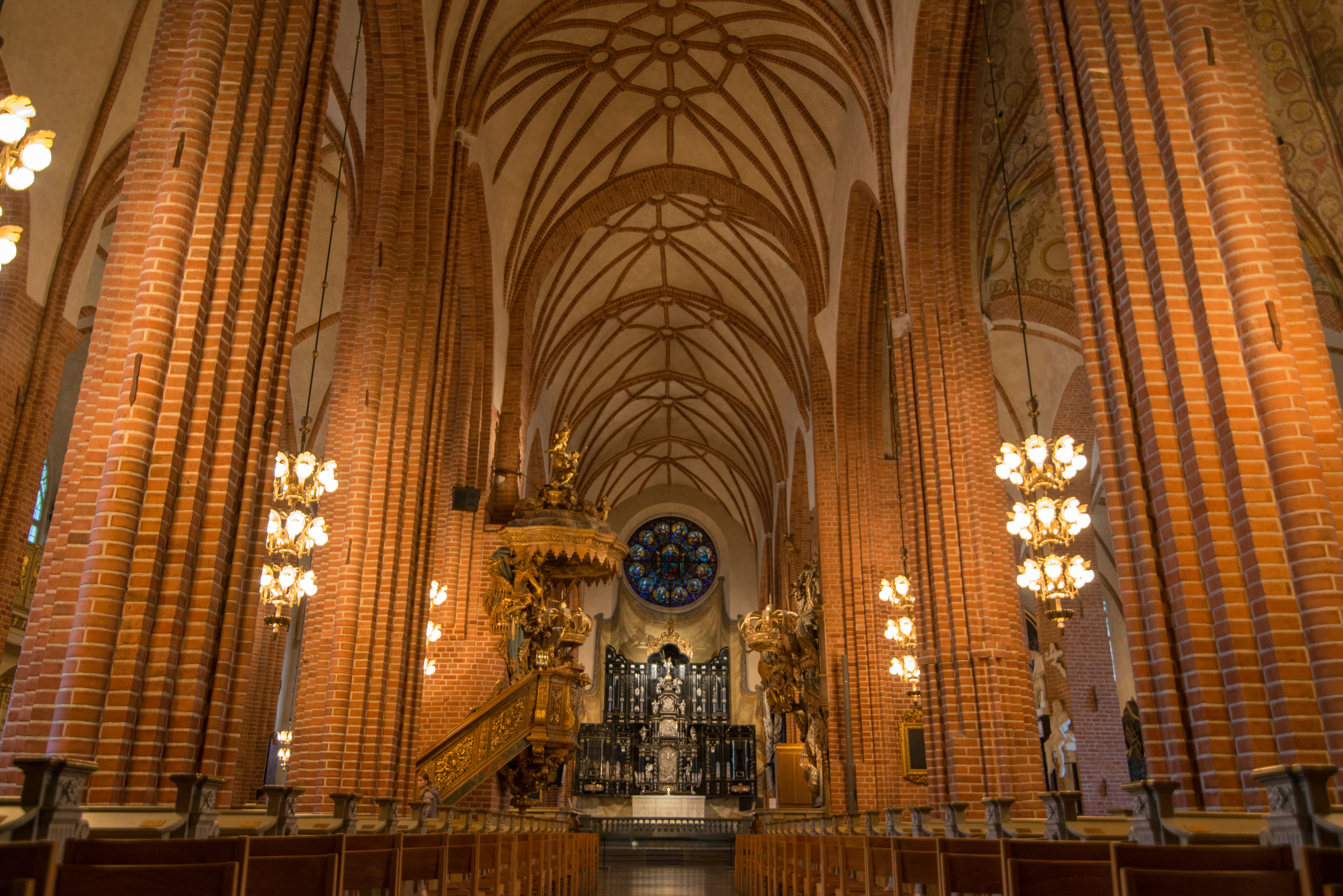
Brick Gothic interior of Storkyrkan in Stockholm, Sweden

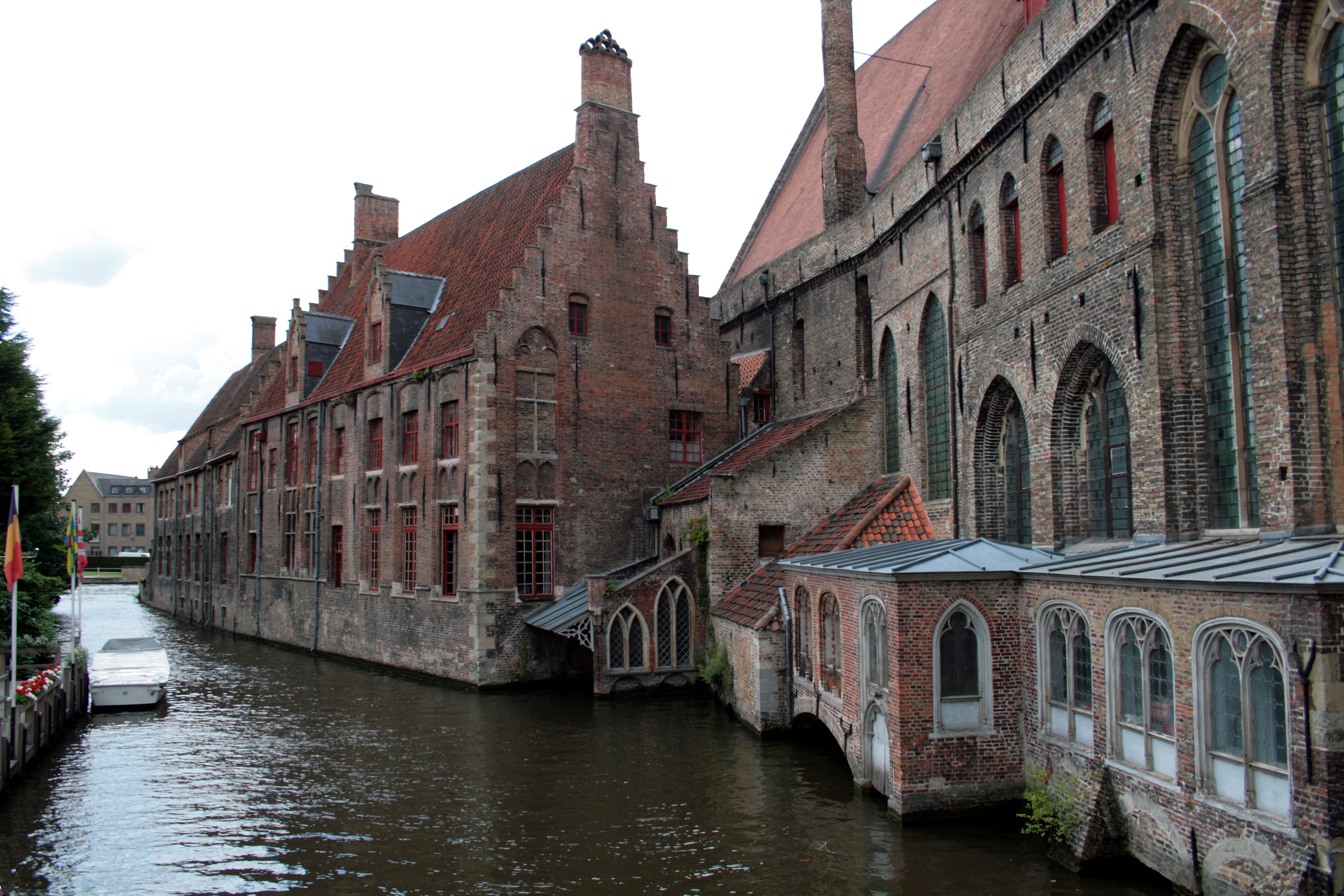
Brick Gothic with some decoration of stone, Old St. John's Hospital in Bruges, Belgium

Romanesque brick architecture remained closely connected with contemporary stone architecture and often simply translated the latter's style and repertoire into the new material. The decorative techniques to suit the new material were imported form northern Italy, where they had been developed as part of the Lombard Style. Among these techniques was the use of moulded brick to realize delicate ornament. Brick Gothic drew on Romanesque building (in stone and in brick) of its region, but in its core area Romanesque stone buildings were rare and often humble In character.

In most regions of Brick Gothic, boulders were available and cheaper than brick. In some regions, cut stone was available as well. Therefore, besides all-brick buildings, there are buildings begun in stone and completed using brick, or built of boulders and decorated with brick, or built of brick and decorated with cut stone, for instance in Lesser Poland and Silesia.

Brick Gothic buildings are often of monumental size, but simple as regards their external appearance, lacking the delicacy of areas further south, but this is not exclusively the case.

None of these buildings is exactly the same today as in the Middle Ages. For instance, many of them have had alterations in a Baroque style and have then been re-gothicized in the 19th century (or reconstructed after World War II). Especially in the 19th century, some buildings were purified during restoration. In the city halls of Lübeck and Stralsund, medieval window framings of stone were replaced by new ones of brick.

At a time when ordinary people lived very locally based lives, the groups responsible for these buildings were internationally mobile: the bishops, abbots, aristocrats, and long-distance merchants who commissioned the work, and the highly skilled specialist craftsmen who carried it out. For this reason the Brick Gothic of the countries around the Baltic Sea was strongly influenced by the cathedrals of France and by the gothique tournaisien or Scheldt Gothic of the County of Flanders (where also some important Brick Gothic was erected).

One typical expression of the structure of walls, the contrast of prominent visible brick with the plastering of recessed areas, had already been developed in Italy, but became prevalent in the Baltic region.

=== Brick as the basic material ===
Since the bricks used were made of clay, available in copious quantities in the Northern German Plain, they quickly became the normal replacement for building stone. The so-called monastic format became the standard for bricks used in representative buildings. Its bricks measure circa 28 x 15 x 9 cm to 30 x 14 x 10 cm, with mortar joints of about 1.5 cm. In contrast to hewn-stone Gothic, the bricks and shaped bricks were not produced locally by lodges (Bauhütten), but by specialised enterprises off-site.

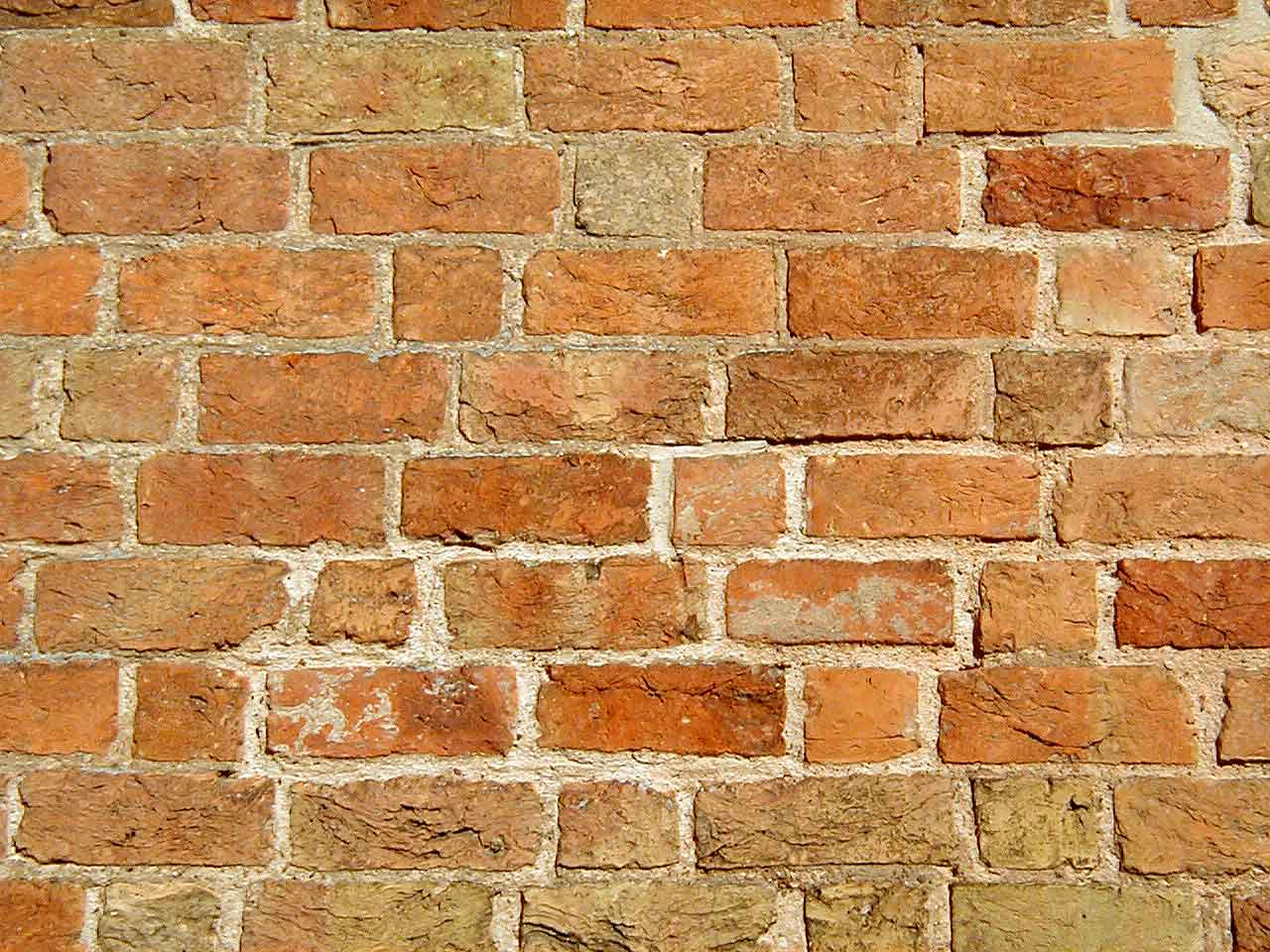
Brick wall in "Gothic bonding"

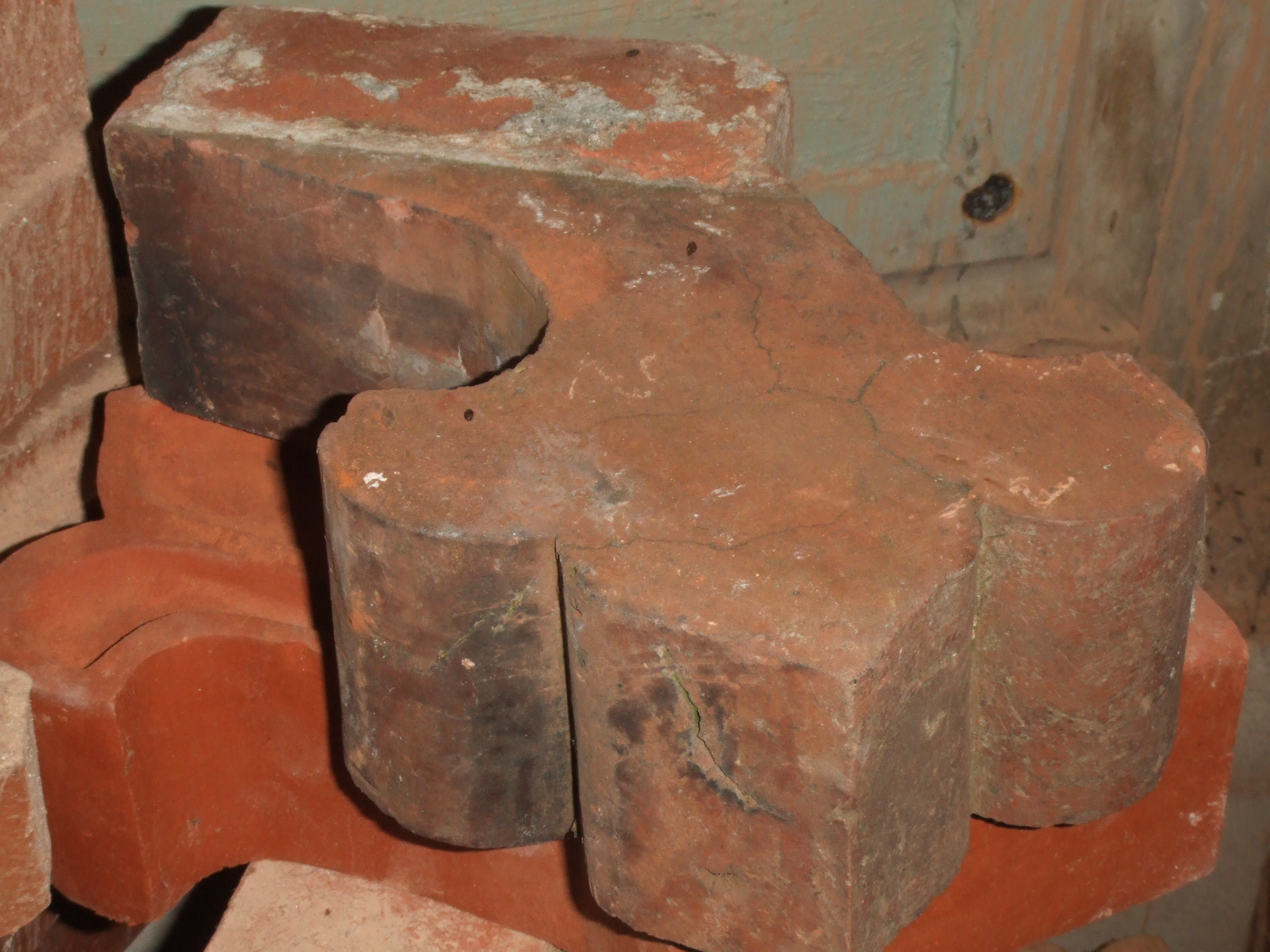
Shaped brick

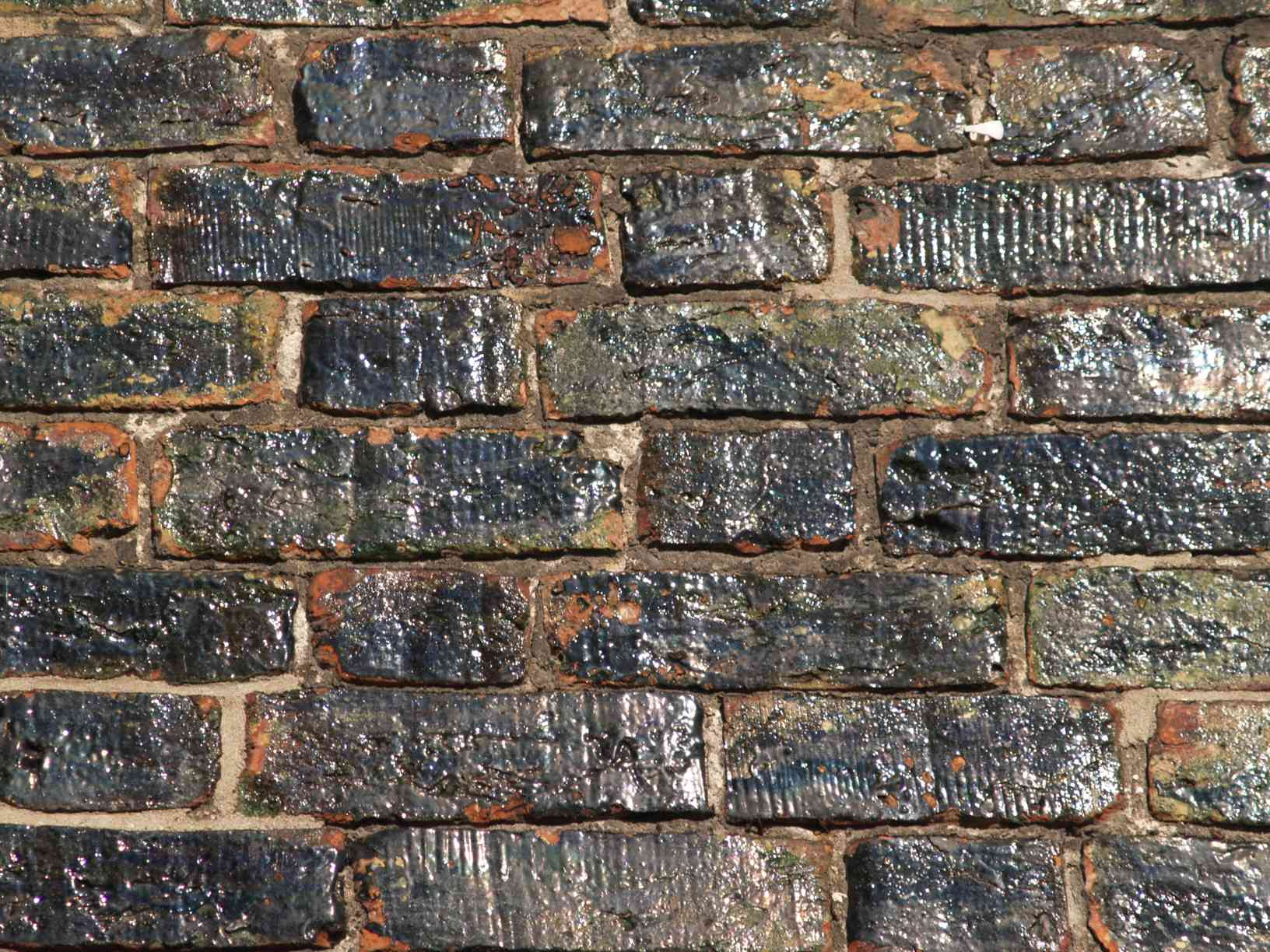
Glazed brick

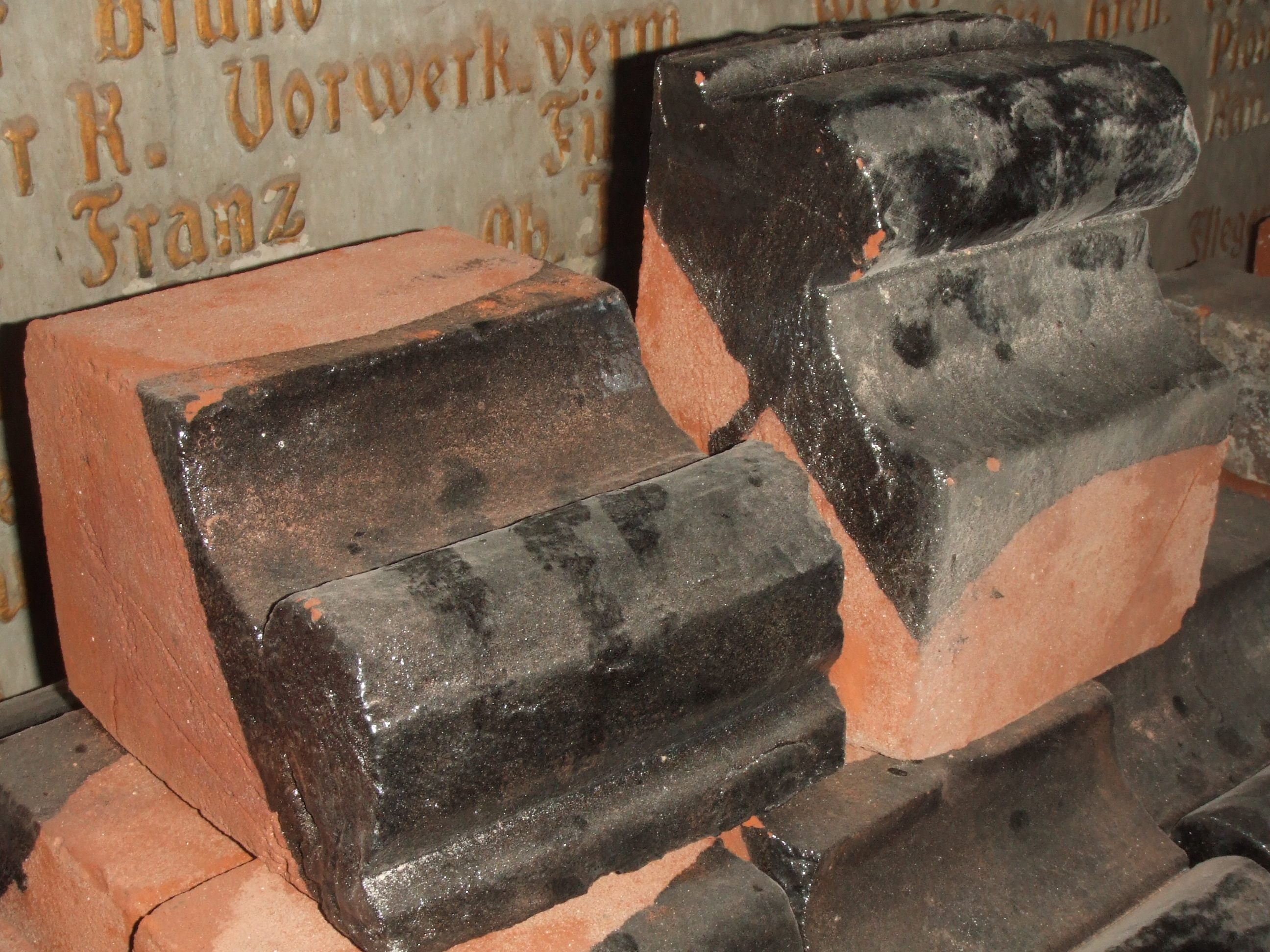
Black-glazed shaped brick

=== Elements ===
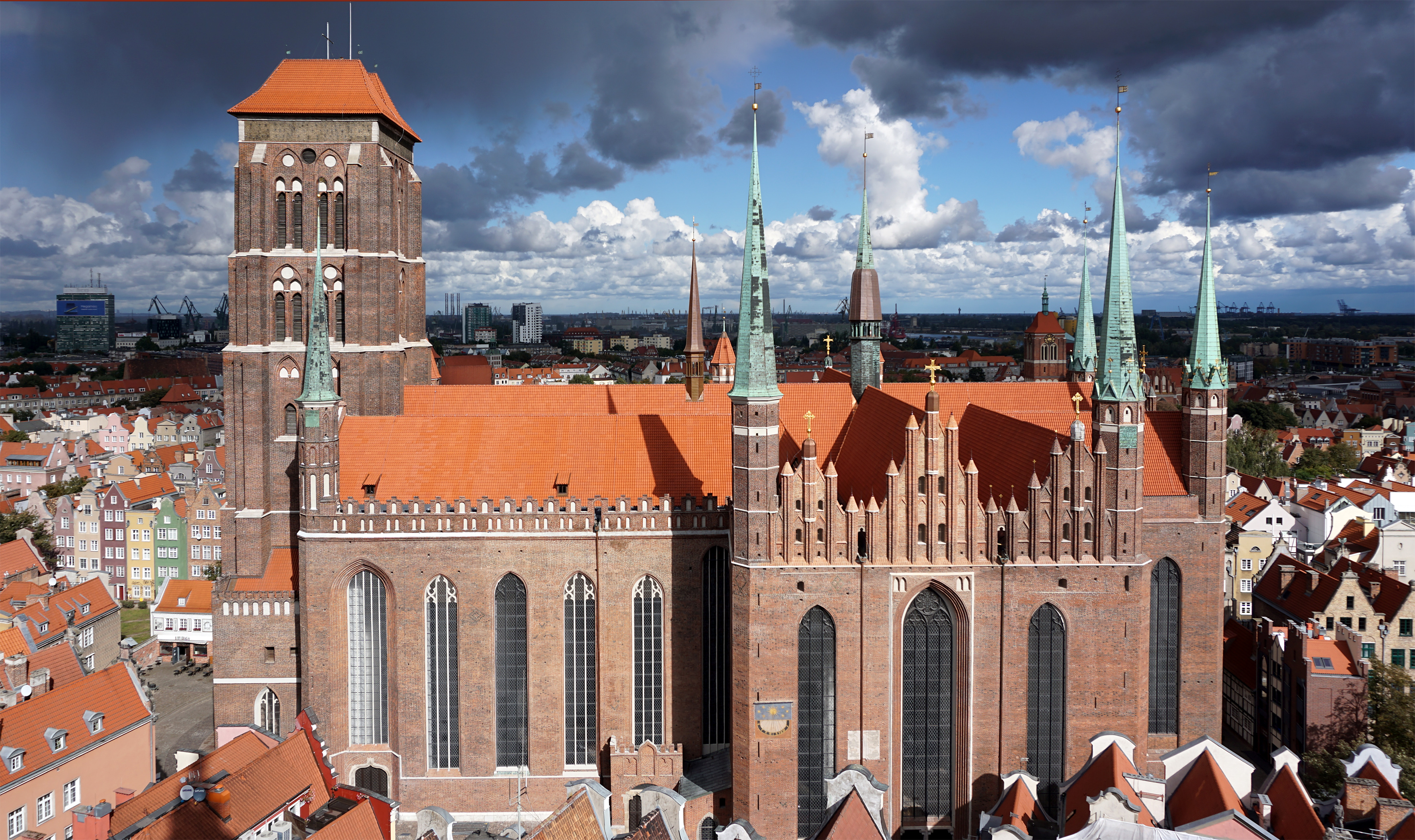
St. Mary's Church in Gdańsk, Poland

The use of shaped bricks for tracery and friezes also can be found in some buildings of northwestern Gothic brick architecture. Masterly use of these elements is found in some of the Gothic buildings of northern Italy, where these highly sophisticated techniques had originally come from, having been developed in the Lombard Romanesque period. There, such brick decorations can even be found on buildings which had been mainly erected in ashlar. Some Italian Gothic brick buildings also have friezes of terracotta.

While in central northern Germany and in Greater Poland suitable natural building stone was unavailable, trading cities could import it by sea. Therefore, St. Mary's Church in Lübeck, generally considered the principal example of Brick Gothic, has two portals made of sandstone, and the edges of its huge towers are built of ashlars, as normal for Gothic brick buildings in the Netherlands and the (German) Lower Rhine region. And the very slim pillars of its Briefkapelle (letters chapel) are of granite from Bornholm. In the Gothic brick towers of the churches of Wismar and of St. Nicholas' Church in Stralsund, stone is not used for structural reasons but aesthetically to provide a contrast of colours. At St. Mary's of Gdańsk, all five lateral portals and some simple but long cornices are of ashlar.

== Germany ==
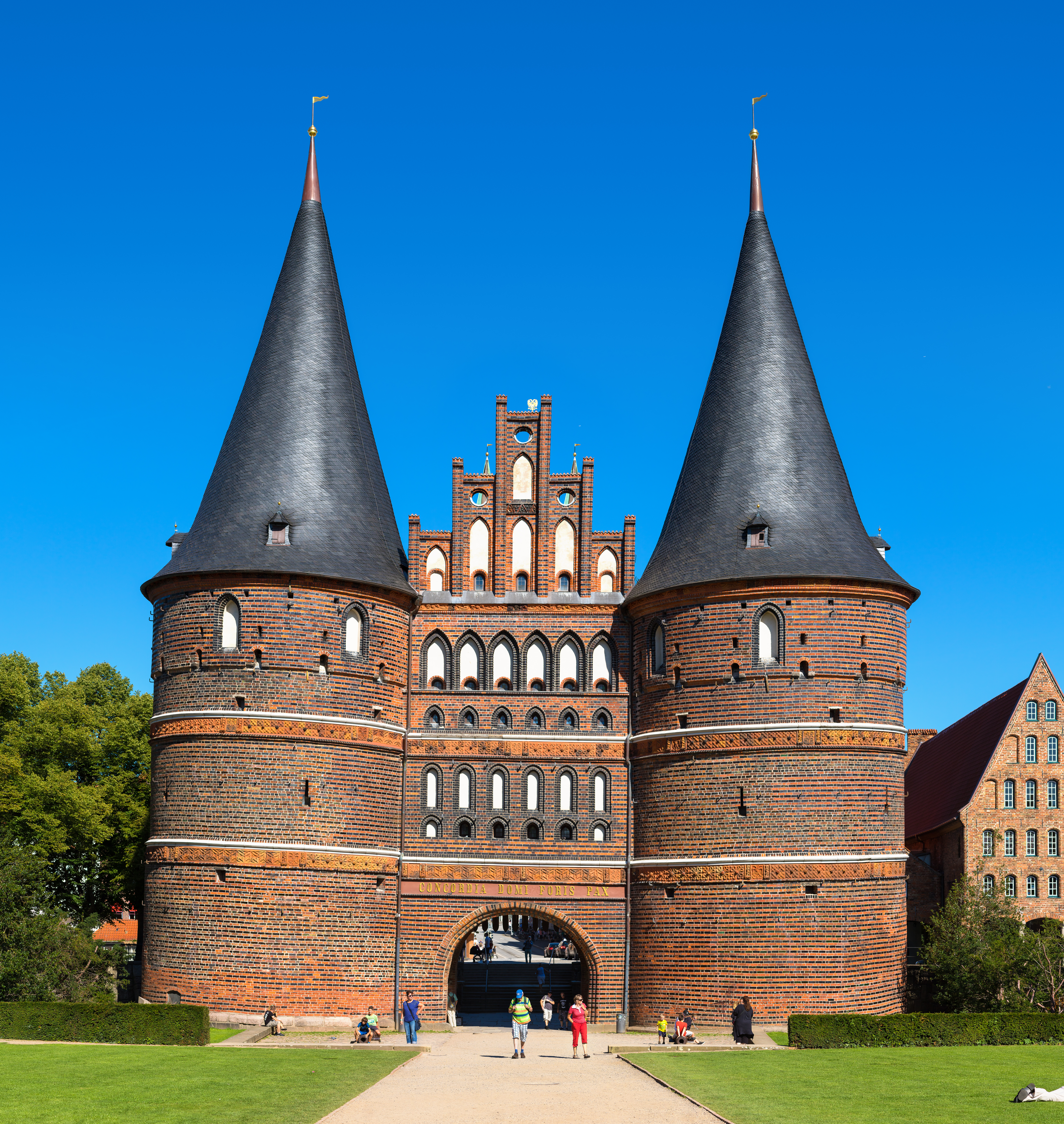
Holstentor in Lübeck

Brick architecture is found primarily in areas that lack sufficient natural supplies of building stone. This is the case across the Northern European Lowlands. Since the German part of that region (the Northern German Plain, except Westphalia and the Rhineland) is largely coextensive with the area influenced by the Hanseatic League, Brick Gothic has become a symbol of that powerful alliance of cities. Along with the Low German Language, it forms a major defining element of the Northern German cultural area, especially in regard to late city foundations and the areas of colonisation north and east of the Elbe. In the Middle Ages and Early Modern Period, that cultural area extended throughout the southern part of the Baltic region and had a major influence on Scandinavia. The southernmost Brick Gothic structure in Germany is the Bergkirche (mountain church) of Altenburg in Thuringia.

In the northwest, especially along Weser and Elbe, sandstone from the mountains of Central Germany could be transported with relative ease. This resulted in a synthesis of the styles from east of the Elbe with the architectural traditions of the Rhineland. Here, bricks were mainly used for wall areas, while sandstone was employed for plastic detail. Since the brick has no aesthetic function per se in this style, most of the northwest German structures are not part of Brick Gothic proper. The Gothic brick buildings near the Lower Rhine have more in common with the Dutch Gothic than with the northern German one.

=== Bavarian Brick Gothic ===
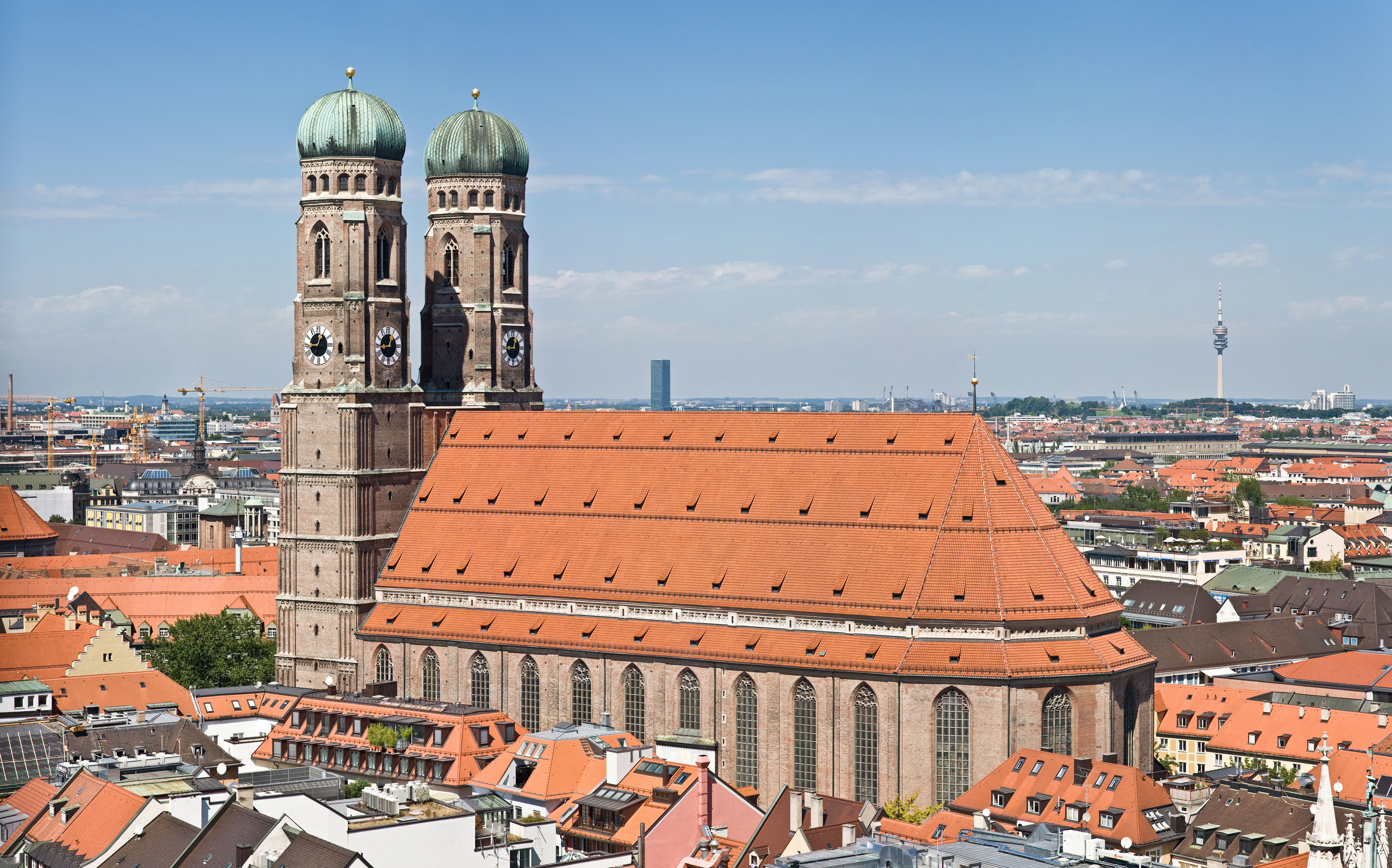
Frauenkirche in Munich, Bavaria, Germany

In Bavaria, there is a significant number of Gothic brick buildings, some in places without quarries, like Munich, and some in places, where natural stone was available as well, such as Donauwörth. Several of these buildings have both decorations of shaped bricks and of ashlar, often tuff. Also the walls of some buildings are all brick, but in some buildings the base of the wall is of stone. Most of the churches share a common distinctive Bavarian Brick Gothic style. The Frauenkirche of Munich is the largest (gothic and totally) brick church north of the Alps. Examples include St. Martin's and two other churches at Landshut and the Herzogsburg (Duke's Castle) in Dingolfing.

== Poland ==
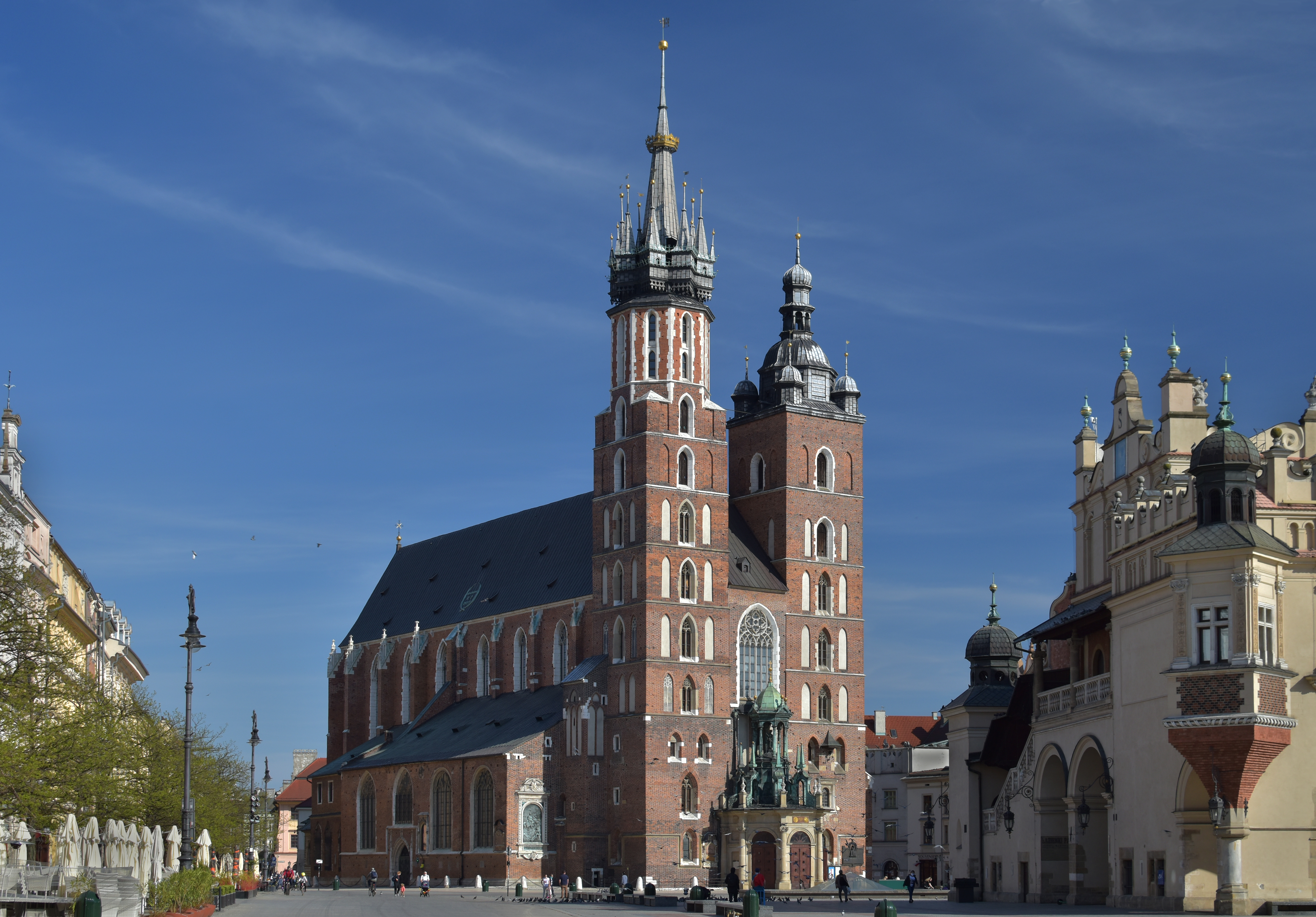
St. Mary's Basilica in Kraków, Poland

Brick Gothic in Poland is sometimes described as belonging to the Polish Gothic style. Though, the vast majority of Gothic buildings within the borders of modern Poland are brick-built, the term also encompasses non-brick Gothic structures, such as the Wawel Cathedral in Kraków, which is mostly stone-built. The principal characteristic of the Polish Gothic style is its limited use of stonework to complement the main brick construction. Stone was primarily utilized for window and door frames, arched columns, ribbed vaults, foundations and ornamentation, while brick remained the core building material used to erect walls and cap ceilings. This limited use of stone, as a supplementary building material, was most prevalent in Lesser Poland and was made possible by an abundance of limestone in the region—further north in the regions of Greater Poland, Silesia, Mazovia, and Pomerania the use of stone was virtually nonexistent.

=== Brick Gothic in Pomerania ===
Much of the coast of the Baltic Sea in the period from the 12th century to 1637 belonged to the Griffins' Duchy of Pomerania. Nowadays its territory is divided into two parts—middle and eastern in Poland and westernmost in Germany. The most outstanding Gothic monuments in this area are Romanesque-Gothic Cathedral of St. John the Baptist in Kamień Pomorski, Cistercian abbey in Kołbacz, ruins of Jasienica Abbey in Police, ruins of Eldena Abbey (a Danish foundation) in Greifswald, St. Mary's Church in Usedom, Castle of the Pomeranian Dukes in Darłowo, remnants of Löcknitz Castle, St. Nicholas collegial church in Greifswald, St. Nicholas' Church in Stralsund, St. Mary's Church in Stralsund, St. Mary and St. Nicholas churches in Anklam, St. Mary's Church in Stargard, St. Nicholas Church in Wolin, St. Peter's Church in Wolgast, Cathedral Basilica of St. James the Apostle in Szczecin, Cathedral of the Immaculate Conception of the Blessed Virgin Mary in Koszalin, Basilica of the Assumption of the Blessed Virgin Mary in Kołobrzeg and Church of Our Lady in Sławno and city halls in Stralsund, Szczecin (Old Town Hall) and Kamień Pomorski. The most important defensive systems were located in Szczecin and Dąbie (present district of the city of Szczecin), Pyrzyce, Usedom, Greifswald, Anklam and Stargard with the water gate on Ina river called Stargard Mill Gate.

== France ==
=== Northern France ===
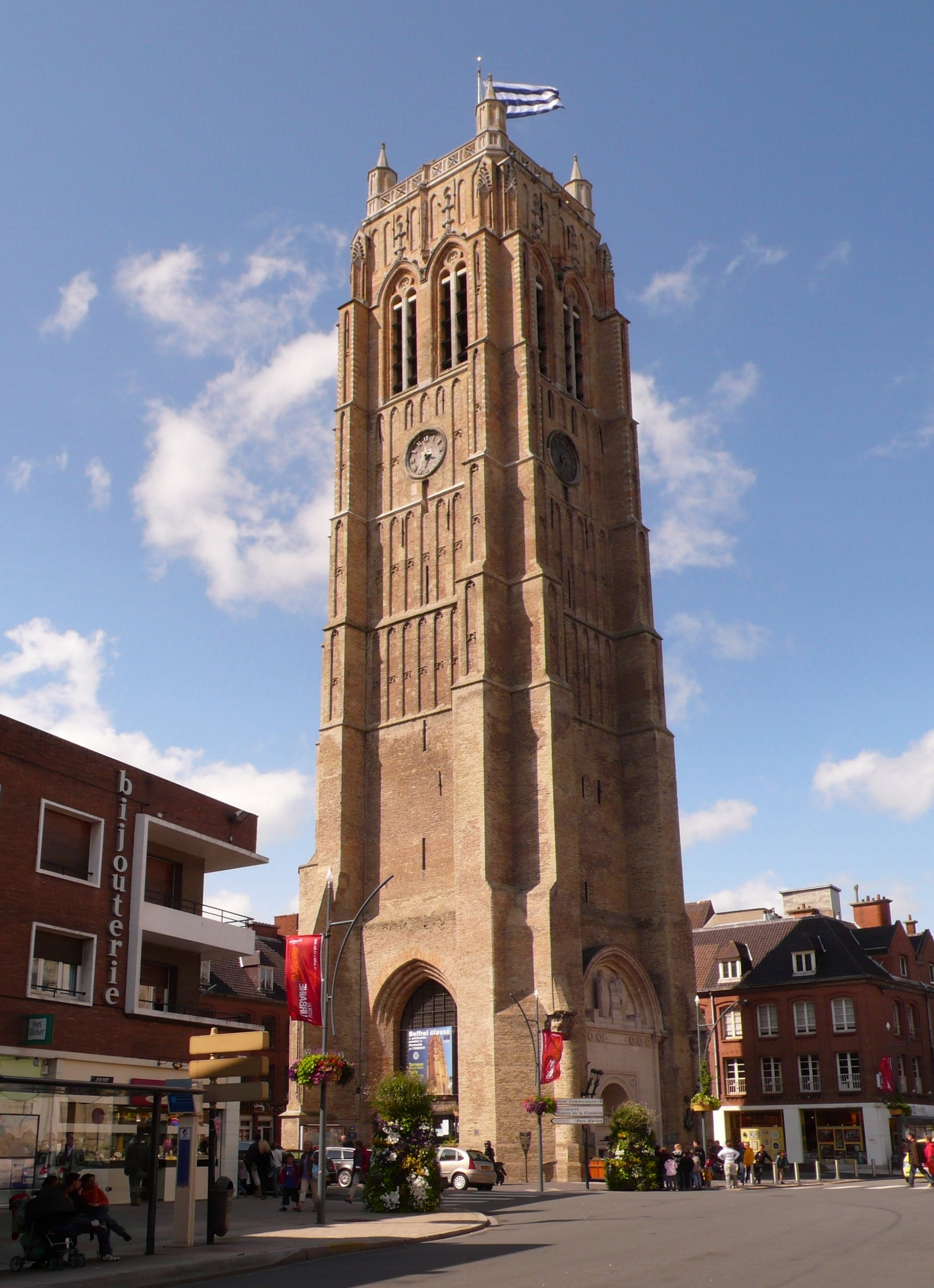
Belfry of Dunkirk

The Westhoek region in the very north of France, situated between Belgium and the Strait of Dover has instances of northern Brick Gothic. For example, there is a strong similarity between the Belfry of Dunkirk and the tower of St Mary's Church in Gdańsk.

=== Southern French Gothic ===
Southern French Gothic is a specific style of Gothic architecture developed in the south of France. It arose in the early 13th century following the victory of the Catholic church over the Cathars, as the church sought to re-establish its authority in the region. As a result, church buildings typically present features drawn from military architecture. The construction material of Southern French Gothic is typically brick rather than stone. Over time, the style came to influence secular buildings as well as churches and spread beyond the area where Catharism had flourished.

== Gothic Revival – 19th-century Neo-gothic ==
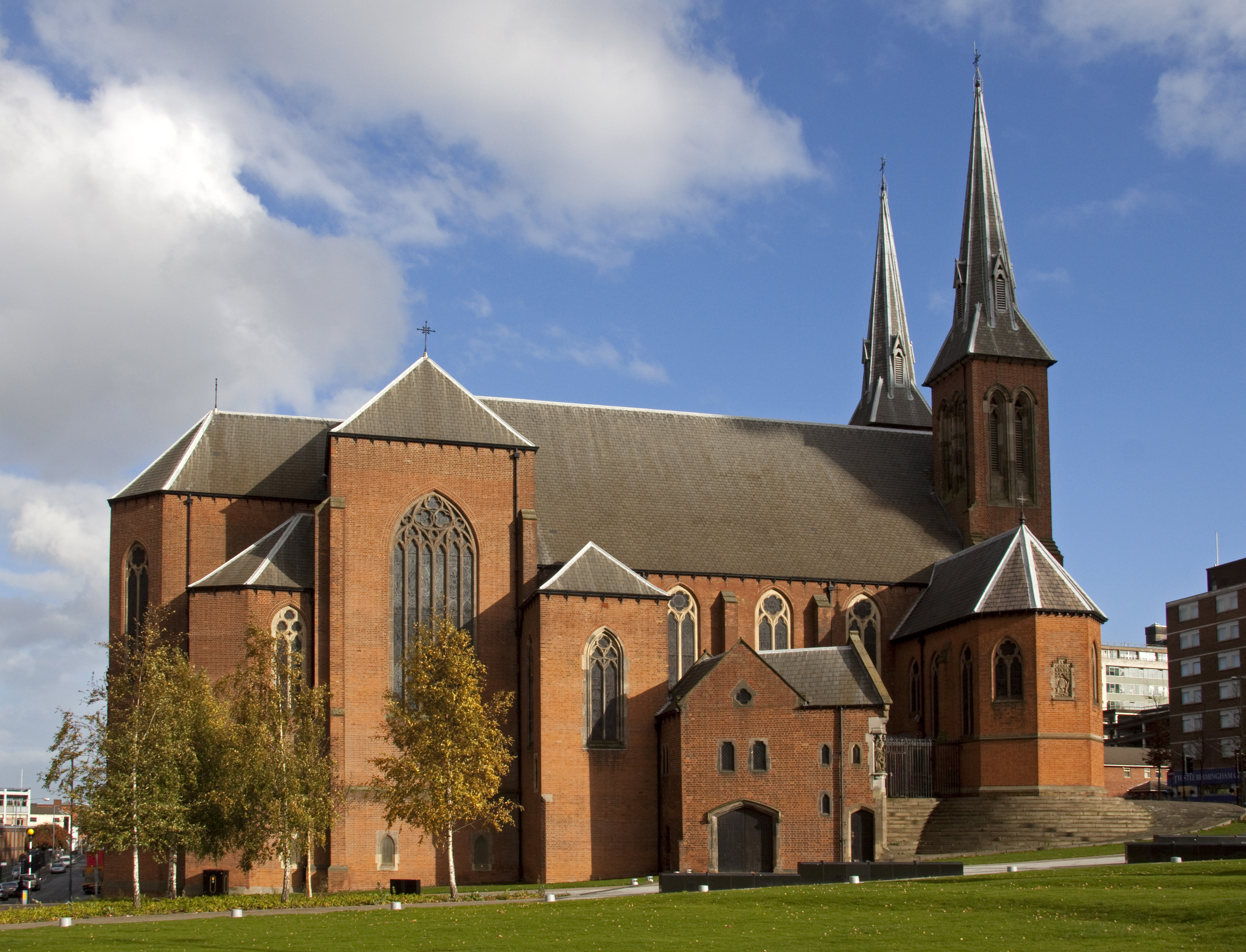
St. Chad's in Birmingham, England (1841)

In the 19th century, the Gothic Revival—Neogothic style led to a revival of Brick Gothic designs. 19th-century Brick Gothic "Revival" churches can be found throughout Northern Germany, Scandinavia, Poland, Lithuania, Finland, the Netherlands, Russia, Britain and the United States.

Important churches in this style included St Chad's Cathedral, Birmingham (1841), by Augustus Pugin, the 1897 Mikkeli Cathedral in Mikkeli in Finland, and St. Joseph's Church in Kraków, Poland, is a late example of the revival style.

== See also ==
- List of Brick Gothic buildings
- European Route of Brick Gothic
- Gothic architecture in modern Poland
- Gothic architecture in Lithuania
- Belarusian Gothic
- List of Brick Romanesque buildings
- List of Brick Renaissance buildings

== Notes and references ==
- Hans Josef Böker: Die mittelalterliche Backsteinarchitektur Norddeutschlands. Darmstadt 1988. ISBN 3-534-02510-5
- Gottfried Kiesow: Wege zur Backsteingotik. Eine Einführung. Monumente-Publikationen der Deutschen Stiftung Denkmalschutz, Bonn 2003, ISBN 3-936942-34-X
- Angela Pfotenhauer, Florian Monheim, Carola Nathan: Backsteingotik. Monumente-Edition. Monumente-Publikation der Deutschen Stiftung Denkmalschutz, Bonn 2000, ISBN 3-935208-00-6
- Fritz Gottlob: Formenlehre der Norddeutschen Backsteingotik: Ein Beitrag zur Neogotik um 1900. 1907. Reprint of 2nd ed., Verlag Ludwig, 1999, ISBN 3-9805480-8-2
- Gerlinde Thalheim (ed.) et al.: Gebrannte Größe – Wege zur Backsteingotik. 5 Vols. Monumente-Publikation der Deutschen Stiftung Denkmalschutz, Bonn, Gesamtausgabe aller 5 Bände unter ISBN 3-936942-22-6
- B. Busjan, G. Kiesow: Wismar: Bauten der Macht – Eine Kirchenbaustelle im Mittelalter. Monumente Publikationen der Deutschen Stiftung Denkmalschutz, 2002, ISBN 3-935208-14-6 (Vol. 2 of series of exhibition catalogues Wege zur Backsteingotik, ISBN 3-935208-12-X)
