= List of bishops and archbishops of Prague =

The following is a list of bishops and archbishops of Prague. The bishopric of Prague was established in 973, and elevated to an archbishopric on 30 April 1344. The current Roman Catholic Archdiocese of Prague is the continual successor of the bishopric established in 973 (with a 140-year sede vacante in the Hussite era). In addition, the city also has an Eastern Orthodox archeparchy (archbishopric), Greek Catholic exarchate and the Prague diocese and patriarchate of the Czechoslovak Hussite Church seat in Prague.

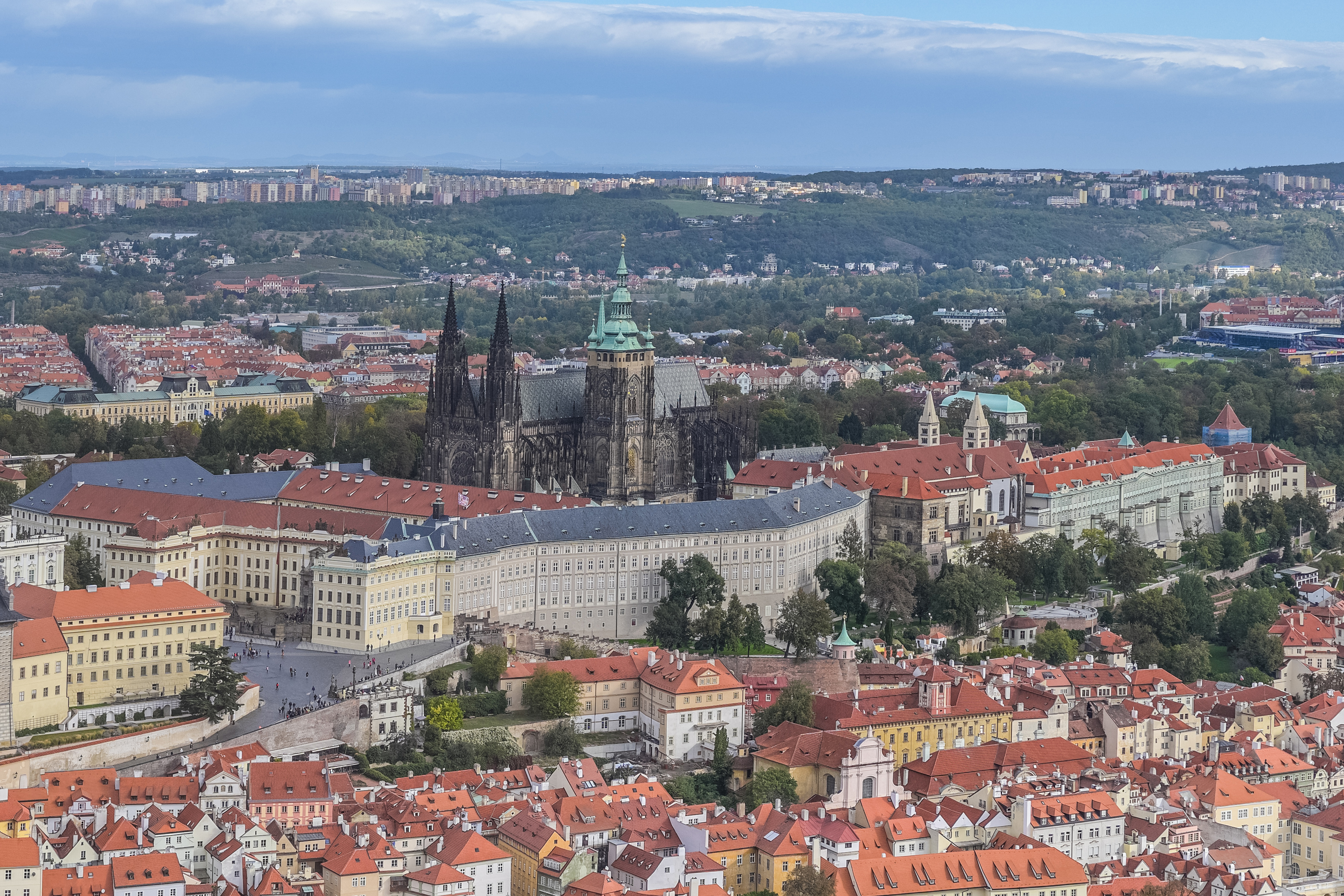
An aerial view of St. Vitus Cathedral. The entire cathedral is situated inside the Prague Castle complex, and is the cathedral of the Archbishops of Prague.

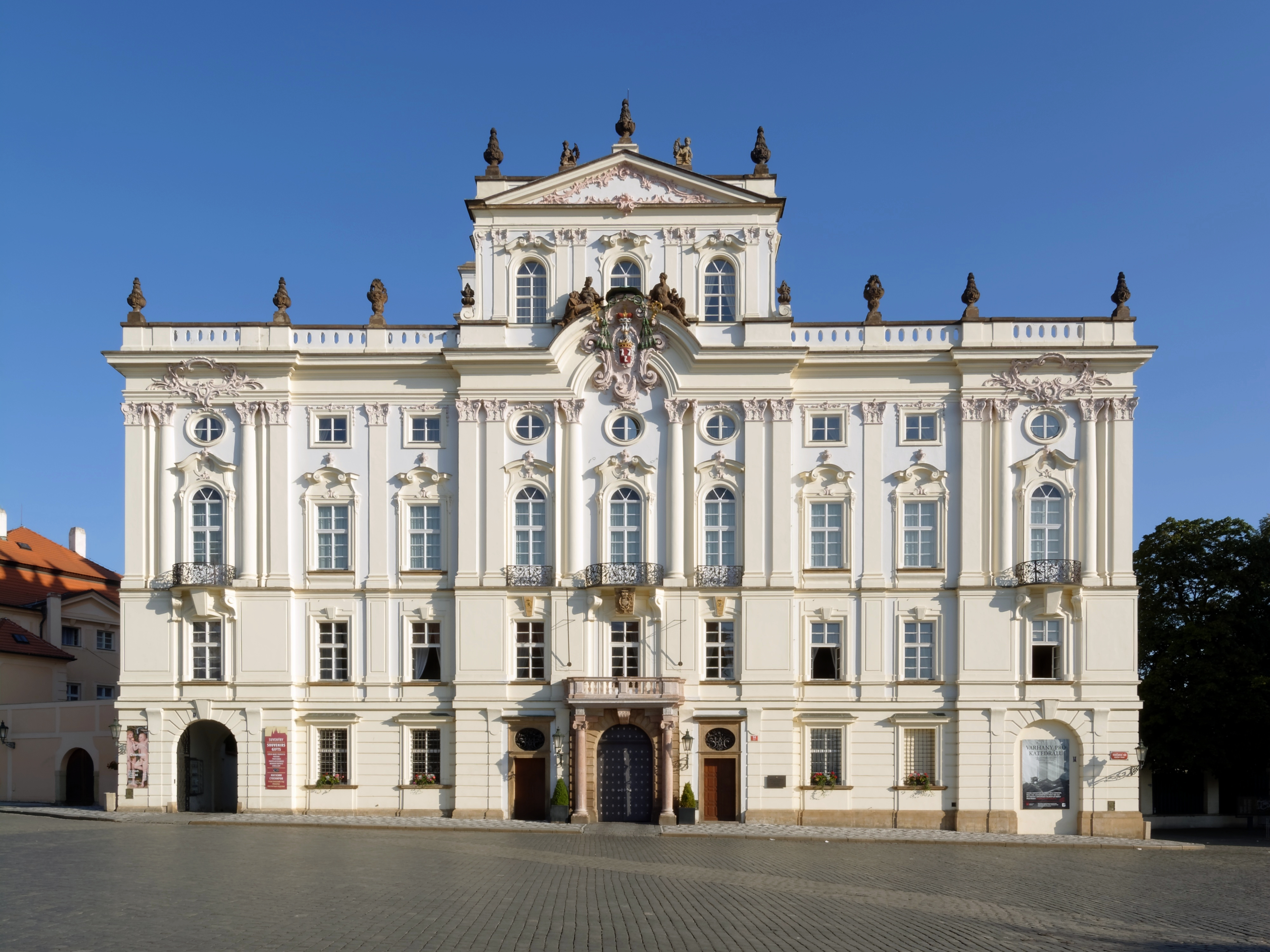
The palace of the Archbishops of Prague, located on the Hradčany Square near the castle.

== Catholic Bishops of Prague ==
The names are given in Czech, with English or otherwise as suitable.

Succession	Name	Dates of bishopric
1.	Dětmar (Thietmar, Dietmar)	973–982
2.	St. Adalbert of Prague	982–996
	Kristian (Strachkvas)	996 (died during consecration)
3.	Thiddag (Deodadus)	998–1017
4.	Ekkhard (Ekkehard, Ekhard, Helicardus)	1017–1023
5.	Hyza (Hyzo, Hizzo, Izzo)	1023–1030
6.	Šebíř (Severus)	1030–1067
7.	Jaromír (Gebhart, Gebehard)	1068–1089
8.	Kosmas	1090–1098
9.	Heřman	1099–1122
10.	Menhart (Meinhard)	1122–1134
11.	Jan I	1134–1139
	Silvestr	1139–1140 (abdicated)
12.	Ota (Otto)	1140–1148
13.	Daniel I	1148–1167
	Gotpold (Goltpold, Gothard, Hotart)	1168 (died before installation)
14.	Bedřich of Puttendorf	1168–1179
15.	Valentin (Veliš)	1179–1182
16.	Henry Bretislaus	1182–1197
17.	Daniel II (Milík of Talmberk)	1197–1214
18.	Ondřej	1214–1224
19.	Pelhřim (Peregrin) of Vartenberk	1224–1225
20.	Budilov (Budivoj, Budislav)	1225–1226
21.	Jan II	1226–1236
22.	Bernhard (Buchard) Kaplíř of Sulevice	1236–1240
23.	Mikuláš of Reisenburk	1240–1258
24.	Jan III of Dražice	1258–1278
25.	Tobiáš of Bechyně	1278–1296
26.	Řehoř Zajíc of Valdek	1296–1301
27.	John IV of Dražice	1301–1343
28.	Arnošt of Pardubice	1343–1344

== Catholic Archbishops of Prague ==
Succession	Name	Dates of archbishopric
1.	Arnošt of Pardubice	1344–1364
2.	Jan Očko of Vlašim	1364–1379
3.	Jan of Jenštejn	1379–1396
4.	Olbram (Volfram) of Škvorec	1396–1402
	Mikuláš Puchník of Černice	1402 (died before consecration)
5.	Zbyněk Zajíc of Hazmburk	1403–1411
6.	Sigismund Albicus	1411–1412
7.	Conrad of Vechta	1413–1421
	sede vacante	1421–1561
8.	Antonín Brus of Mohelnice	1561–1580
9.	Martin Medek of Mohelnice	1581–1590
10.	Zbyněk Berka of Dubá	1592–1606
11.	Karel Graf von Lamberk	1607–1612
12.	Johann Lohel	1612–1622
13.	Ernst Adalbert von Harrach	1623–1667
	Johann Wilhelm Graf von Liebstein von Kolovrat	1667–1668 (died before consecration)
14.	Matouš Ferdinand Sobek (Zoubek) of Bílenberk	1669–1675
15.	Jan Bedřich Graf von Waldstein	1675–1694
16.	Jan Josef Graf von Breuner	1695–1710
17.	Ferdinand Graf von Khünburg	1713–1731
18.	Daniel Josef Mayer of Mayer	1732–1733
	Jan Adam Vratislav of Mitrovice	1733 (died before confirmation)
19.	Johann Moriz Gustav Graf von Manderscheid–Blankenheim	1733–1763
20.	Antonín Petr hrabě Příchovský of Příchovice	1764–1793
21.	Wilhelm Florentin Fürst von Salm	1793–1810
22.	Václav Leopold Chlumčanský of Přestavlky and Chlumčany	1815–1830
23.	Alois Josef Krakovský z Kolovrat	1831–1833
24.	Andrzej Alojzy Ankwicz	1834–1838
25.	Alois Josef, Freiherr von Schrenk	1838–1849
26.	Friedrich Johannes Jacob Celestin von Schwarzenberg	1849–1885
27.	Franziskus von Paula Graf von Schönborn	1885–1899
28.	Lev Skrbenský z Hříště	1899–1916
29.	Pavel Huyn	1916–1919
30.	František Kordač	1919–1931
31.	Karel Kašpar	1931–1941
32.	Josef Beran	1946–1969
33.	František Tomášek	1977–1991
34.	Miloslav Vlk	1991–2010
35.	Dominik Duka	2010–2022
36.	Jan Graubner	2022–2025
38.	Stanislav Přibyl, C.Ss.R	Present

== Orthodox bishops of Prague ==
The first Orthodox mission in Czech lands was led by Saints Cyril and Methodius, some time before the East–West Schism, with its centre in Moravia. The current Czech and Slovak Orthodox Church comes from the Czech Orthodox clubs and partly arose from the early Czechoslovak Church which separated from the Roman Catholic Church in the 1920s. Consequently, the Czechoslovak Church tended towards Protestantism and an Orthodox branch split off. The Prague Archeparchy encompasses the whole of Bohemia.

- Gorazd (Pavlík) 1921–1942
- Savvatij (Vrabec) 1926–?
- Sergij (Koroljov) 1945–1946
- Eleuterius (Voroncov) 1946–1955
- Jan (Kuchtin) 1956–1964
- Dorotheus (Filip) 1963–1999
- Christopher (Pulec) 2000–2013
- Jáchym (Hrdý) 2014–2015
- Michal (Dandár) since 2014

== Greek Catholic bishops of Prague ==
The Apostolic Exarchate of the Greek Catholic Church in the Czech Republic was established in 1996. Exarchs to date have been:

- Ivan Ljavinec, 1996–2003
- Ladislav Hučko, 2003–2025

== Prague bishops of the Czechoslovak Church and Czechoslovak Hussite Church ==
The Czechoslovak Hussite Church (until 1971 Czechoslovak Church) split off from the Roman Catholics in 1920s. Initially the church varied between Catholic modernism, Orthodoxy and Protestantism; today it is a Protestant church in principle.

Bishops of Prague Diocese:

1. Karel Farský, 1925–1927
2. Gustav Adolf Procházka, 1928–1942
3. Miroslav Novák, 1946–1962
4. Josef Kupka, 1962–1982 (in 1971, the church was renamed to "Hussite")
5. Miroslav Durchánek, 1982–1988
6. René Hradský, 1989–1999
7. Karel Bican 1999–2007
8. David Tonzar, since 2008

Prague is also the seat of patriarchs. The two first Bishops of Prague were also patriarchs. Since 1946, the patriarch is a different bishop.

1. Karel Farský, 1924–1927
2. Gustav Adolf Procházka, 1928–1942
3. František Kovář, 1946–1961
4. Miroslav Novák, 1961–1990
5. Vratislav Štěpánek, 1991–1994
6. Josef Špak, 1994–2001
7. Jan Schwarz, 2001–2005
8. Tomáš Butta, since 2006
