= John IV of Dražice =

John IV. of Dražice
- Bishop of Prague
- Church: Latin
- See: Prague
- Predecessor: Gregory of Valdek
- Successor: Arnošt of Pardubice

Orders
- Consecration: 10 December 1301

Personal details
- Born: c. 1260 Kingdom of Bohemia
- Died: 5 January 1343 (aged 82–83) probably Prague, Kingdom of Bohemia
- Buried: St. Vitus Cathedral, Prague
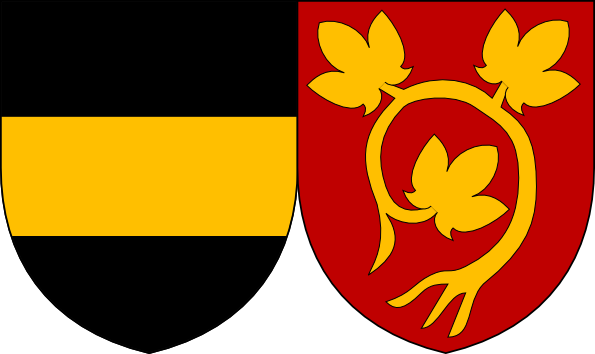
- Coat of arms

John IV of Dražice (Czech: Jan IV. z Dražic; c. 1260 – 5 January 1343) was the penultimate Bishop of Prague, serving from 1301 to 1343. His successor, Arnošt of Pardubice, became the first Archbishop of Prague in 1343. John IV played a significant role in bringing the Luxembourg dynasty to the Bohemian throne and was a notable patron of architecture and the arts.

== Origin and career ==
John came from an old Czech noble family, the Lords of Dražice, which derived its name from the village and fortress of Dražice (today part of Benátky nad Jizerou) in Bohemia. His parents were Řehník of Dražice, who was a court official and nobleman of Ottokar II of Bohemia, and Anna of Skyřice. Two Prague bishops also used the same predicate – John II of Dražice (died around 1236) and his nephew John III of Dražice (died 1278) – although sources do not confirm their kinship with Jan IV of Dražice. Johann is first mentioned in sources in 1274 as a canon of Prague, a canon of the Vyšehrad Chapter, and a holder of a benefice in Prague. In 1287, he was consecrated as a subdeacon.

== Bishop of Prague ==
After the death of Prague Bishop Gregory of Valdek in 1301, John was elected the 27th Bishop of Prague. In 1310, he supported the election of John of Luxembourg as King of Bohemia and provided military assistance to help him secure the throne. At the age of fifty, he was consecrated at St. Vitus Cathedral by Peter of Aspelt, who was the Bishop of Basel and the King's chancellor. This event was recorded in his chronicle by František of Prague, who emphasized the presence of King Wenceslaus II and the gifts John received from the king.

John diligently fulfilled his episcopal duties even amid political disputes. He zealously defended and promoted both the material and spiritual independence of the Church. He organized the extensive estates of the Prague bishops and reformed the legal status of the bishopric's subjects, while also ensuring support for the lower clergy. In 1308, he succeeded in establishing full episcopal authority over the parishes, overcoming resistance from the nobility. In the same year, statutes were issued that set out the fundamental rules for canonical life.

== Suspended bishop ==
John came into conflict not only with the nobility and towns but also with the Dominicans, due to the emerging Inquisition, and he opposed the intrusion of mendicant orders into cities. Their spokesperson was then the provost of Litoměřice and Dominican, Jindřich of Šumburk, who also had long-standing personal disputes with John. Henry accused John of disobedience to the pope, engaging in simony, failing to observe papal excommunications, showing favoritism toward heretics in Prague, and even interfering with inquisitors in the prosecution of heretics.

Pope John XXII ordered an investigation and, as a preventive measure, removed John from the administration of the Prague diocese by a papal bull in 1318. John decided to travel to Avignon (the papal residence at the time) to defend himself personally against the false accusations. At the time of his departure, he was nearly seventy years old and did not realize that he would spend the next eleven years there under forced residence. The slow pace of the proceedings was motivated by financial gain; the longer the process lasted, the more money the papal court received from John of Dražice. Eventually, he was fully pardoned by the pope and, during the last two years of his stay, also provided for financially. He returned to Bohemia in 1329.

== Donor and building activities ==
The long period John spent in Avignon proved highly inspiring for him. At that time, the papal city was undergoing extensive architectural changes – including the construction of the papal palace, palaces of cardinals and renovations of churches. This influence was strongly reflected in the art he later commissioned.

He regained the plundered episcopal estates, restored many buildings and agricultural structures, and commissioned the construction of numerous new churches and various works of art. Some historians even compare him to Emperor Charles IV.

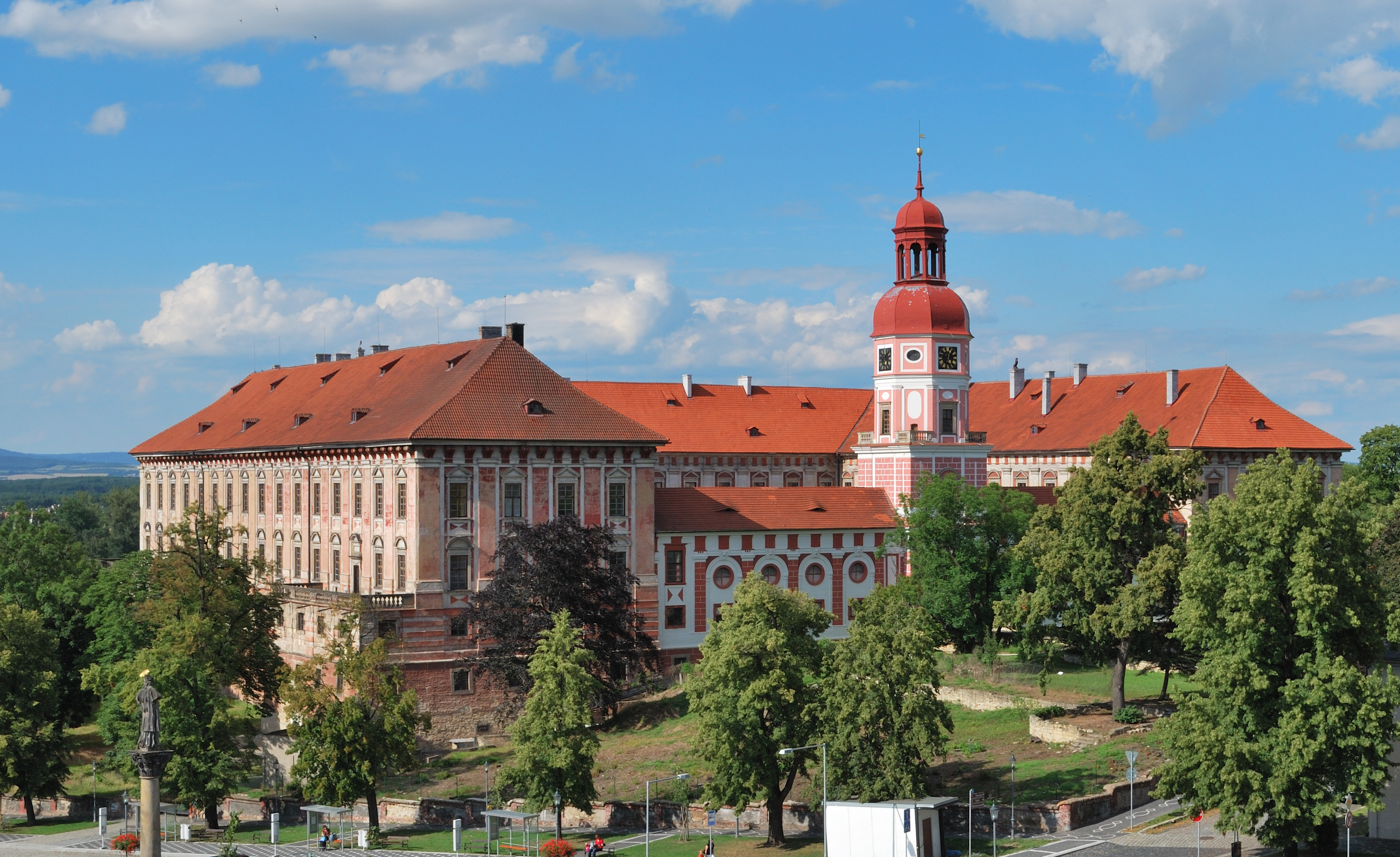
oudnice nad Labem Castle

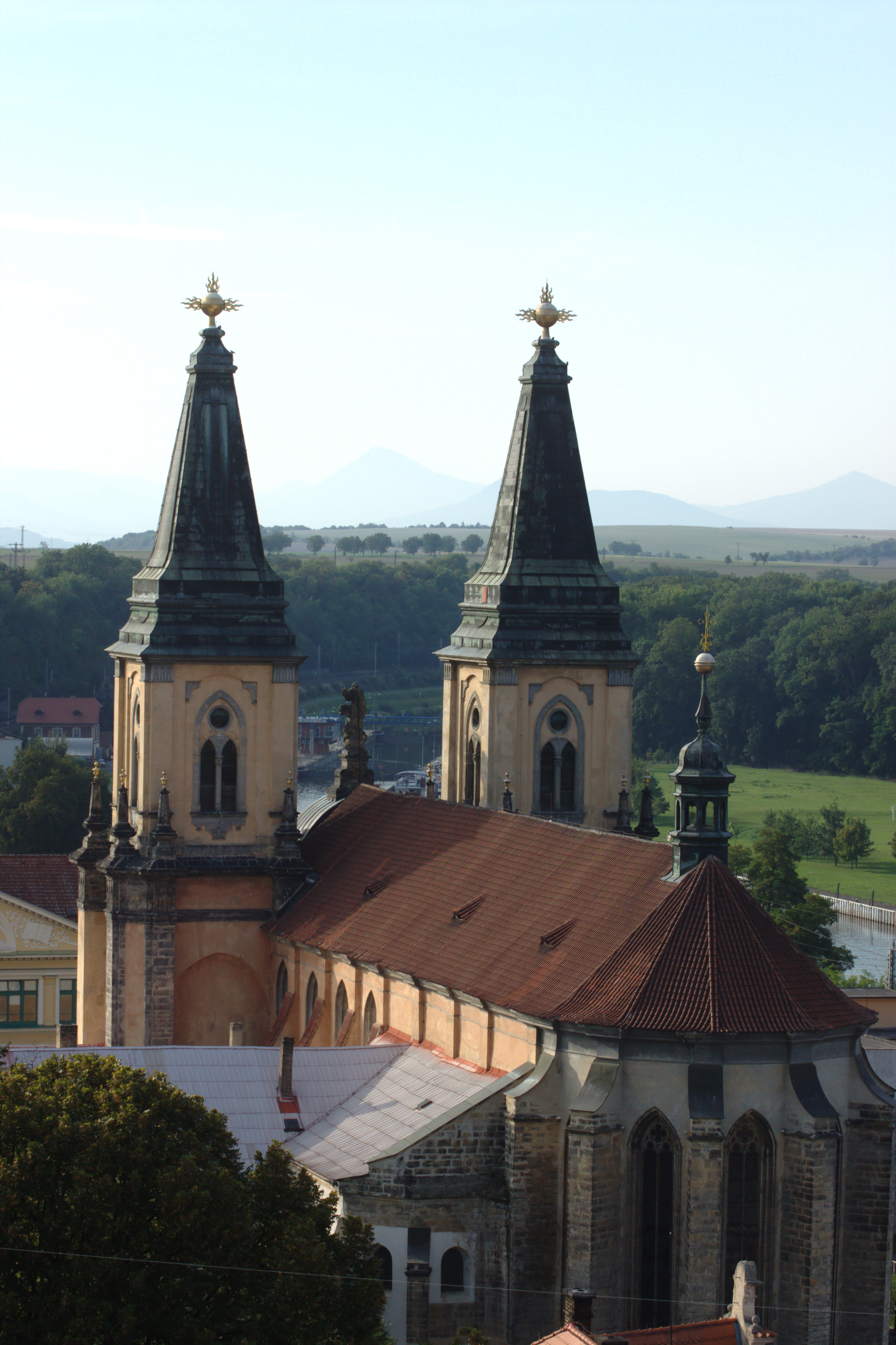
Augustinan canonry of Roudnice

Before his departure to Avignon, he contributed to the continuation of the construction of the Chapter Church of St. Giles in Prague's Old Town. He also had the episcopal residence near the Judith Bridge in Malá Strana renovated, fortifying it and decorating it with paintings featuring portraits of his predecessors, coats of arms of the Bohemian nobility, and morally instructive texts inspired by Avignonese culture.

John devoted most of his energy to rebuilding and constructing the episcopal residence in Roudnice nad Labem, designed to emulate the papal seat. He was influenced by the Devotio Moderna movement and the Order of Augustinian Canons, for whom he founded a religious house in Roudnice. French architects oversaw the construction. The monastic Church of the Virgin Mary was built from dressed stone blocks, with elaborate tracery and glass paintings, and its choir was consecrated in 1340. The founding charter stipulated that only native Czechs "from both father and mother of the Czech language" could join the community, demonstrating the bishop's interest in promoting the Czech national element within the Church. John also established a hospital for the poor, entrusted to the care of the Roudnice canons. In Roudnice, he further commissioned a stone bridge across the Elbe – one of the oldest in Bohemia.

In addition to his building projects, John devoted energy to creating an extensive library, which he donated to the Augustinians. His patronage included commissioning significant works of visual art. Among the most notable are the so-called Roudnice Fragment (Predela Roudnická), depicting St. Andrew, St. John the Evangelist, and St. Peter (now in the National Gallery Prague), the Antependium from Pirna, and paintings with the Tree of Life in the Roudnice Monastery's cloister. The Prague Kaufmann Crucifixion, from a workshop around the mid-14th century, is also associated with him.

In St. Vitus Basilica in Prague Castle, John IV commissioned the Chapel of St. Martha in 1336 as his burial place and established altars dedicated to St. Lawrence, St. Anne, and St. Sylvester. Among his grandest works was the tomb of St. Adalbert, adorned with gold, silver, and sculptures.

He died in 1343 and was buried in St. Vitus Cathedral in Prague.
