= Antwerp Bible =

Early 15th-century illuminated manuscript Bible

Detail of decoration from the Antwerp Bible

The Antwerp Bible or Bible of Konrad of Vechta is an early 15th-century illuminated manuscript Bible, preserved in the Plantin-Moretus Museum, Antwerp, Belgium. Its illuminations are modeled on those in the Wenceslas Bible. The manuscript was probably produced for Conrad of Vechta, controller of the Royal Mint (1401-3) and later the Chancellor to Wenceslas IV of Bohemia. It was acquired by the Moretus family in 1805.
