= Příkrý =

- Municipality
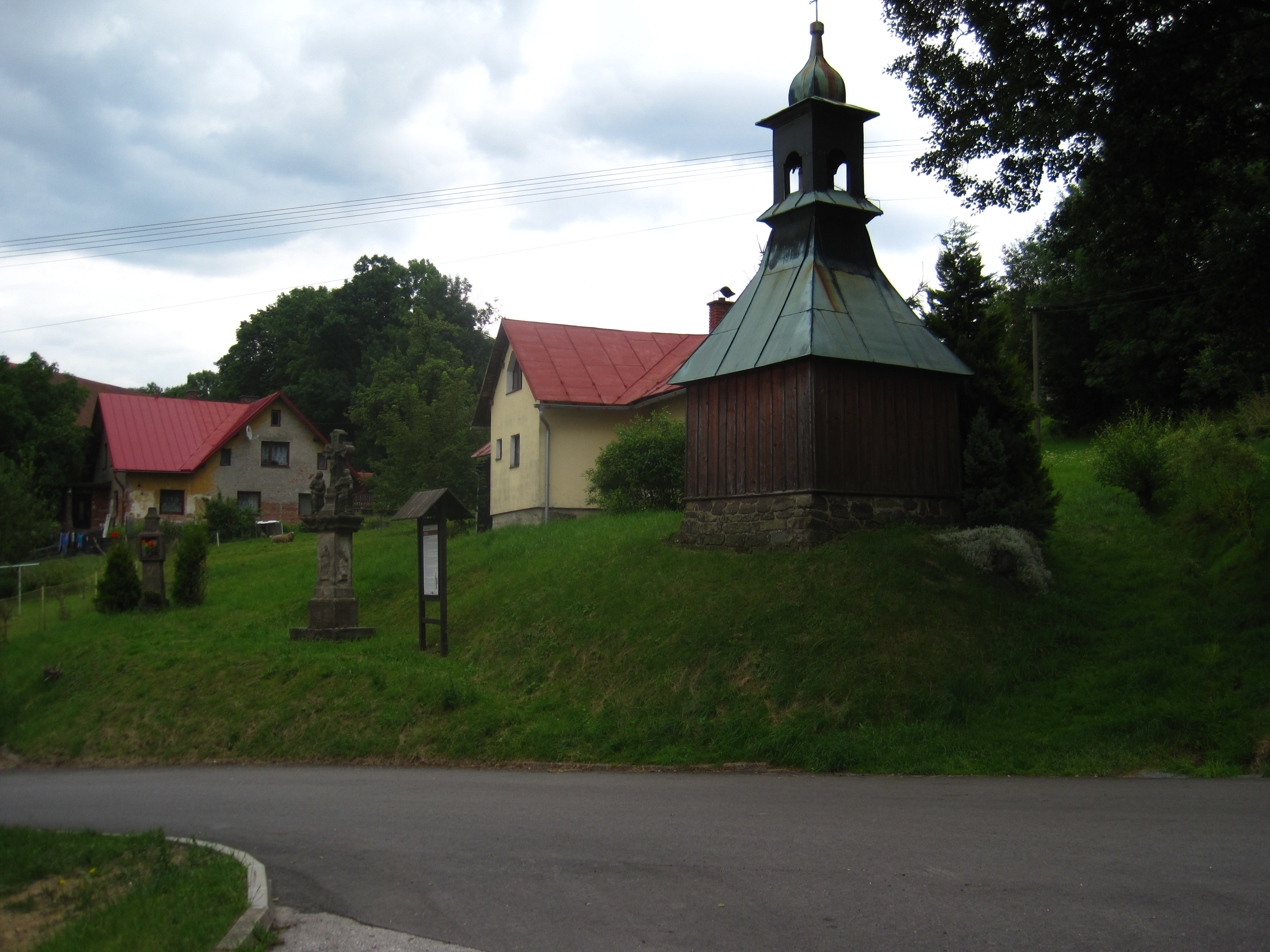
- Centre of Příkrý

- Location in the Czech Republic
- Coordinates: 50°37′30″N 15°21′53″E
- Country: Czech Republic
- Region: Liberec
- District: Semily
- First mentioned: 1634

Area
  - Total: 7.33 km^{2} (2.83 sq mi)
- Elevation: 518 m (1,699 ft)

Population (2026-01-01)
  - Total: 248
  - Density: 33.8/km^{2} (87.6/sq mi)
- Time zone: UTC+1 (CET)
  - Summer (DST): UTC+2 (CEST)
- Postal code: 513 01
- Website: www.obecprikry.cz

Příkrý is a municipality and village in Semily District in the Liberec Region of the Czech Republic. It has about 200 inhabitants.

== Administrative division ==
Příkrý consists of two municipal parts (in brackets population according to the 2021 census):

- Příkrý (181)
- Škodějov (60)

== Etymology ==
In Czech, the name literally means 'steep'. The adjective originally referred to a nearby steep hill.

== Geography ==
Příkrý is located about 3 kilometres (2 mi) northeast of Semily and 25 km (16 mi) southeast of Liberec. It lies in a hilly landscape in the Giant Mountains Foothills. The highest point is the hill Skalka at 611 m (2,005 ft) above sea level.

== History ==
The first written mention of Příkrý is from 1623. Škodějov was first mentioned in 1388. From 1644 to 1754, both villages belonged to the Jesenný estate. In 1754, the Jesenný estate was annexed to the Semily estate.

== Demographics ==
Historical population

Year	Pop.	±%
1869	928	—
1880	931	+0.3%
1890	907	−2.6%
1900	806	−11.1%
1910	809	+0.4%

Year	Pop.	±%
1921	788	−2.6%
1930	730	−7.4%
1950	497	−31.9%
1961	433	−12.9%
1970	392	−9.5%

Year	Pop.	±%
1980	333	−15.1%
1991	244	−26.7%
2001	240	−1.6%
2011	258	+7.5%
2021	241	−6.6%

Source: Censuses

== Transport ==
There are no railways or major roads passing through the municipality.

== Sights ==
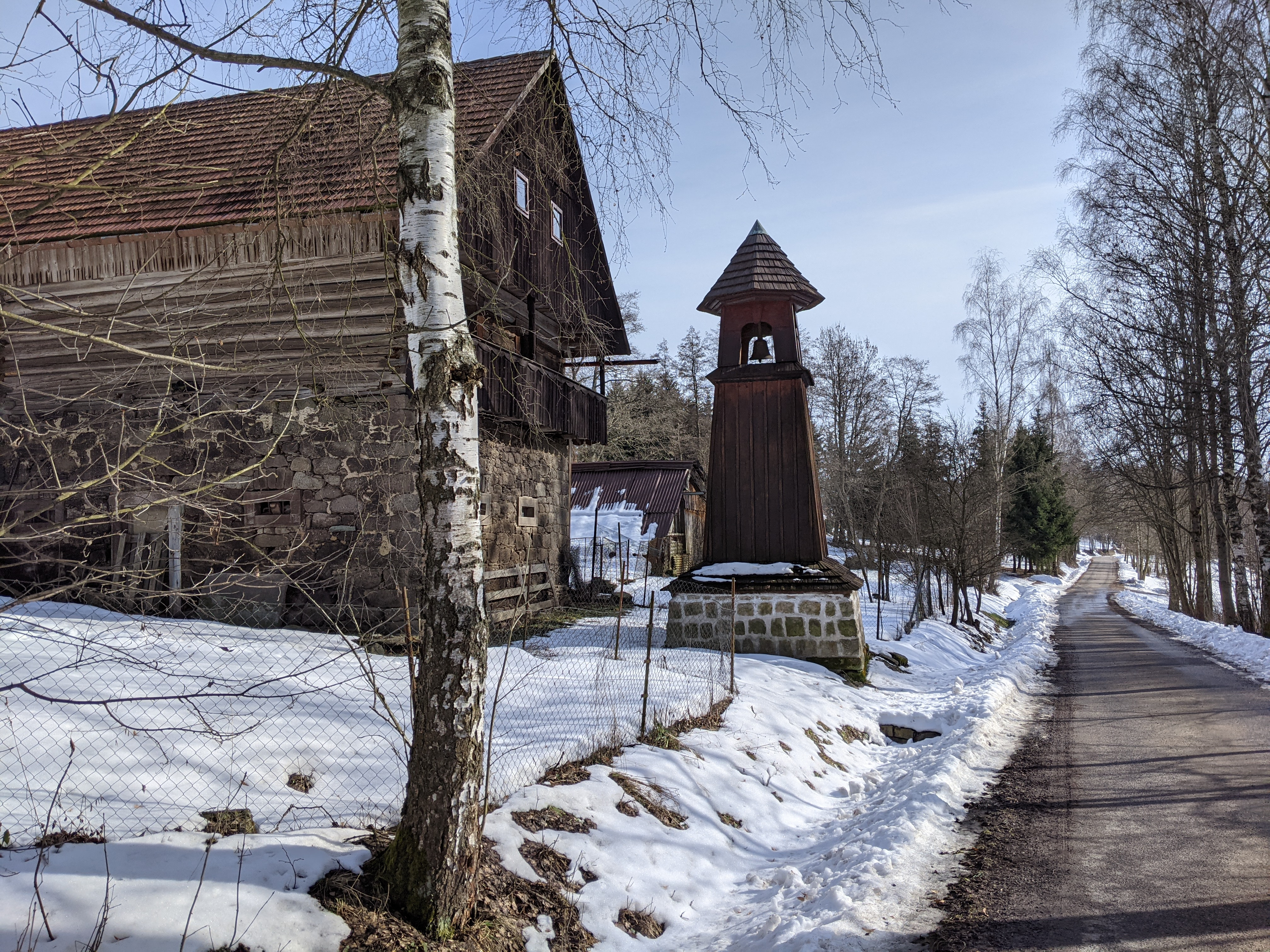
Wooden belfry in Škodějov

The main landmark of Příkrý is a wooden belfry. It was built in 1715, but it is not protected as a cultural monument. Next to the belfry is the Calvary sculpture group from the second half of the 18th century.

The main landmark of Škodějov is a wooden belfry from 1849.

== Notable people ==
- Karel Farský (1880–1927), Czech Roman Catholic priest and patriarch of the Czechoslovak Hussite Church
