= Sebranice (Blansko District) =

- Municipality
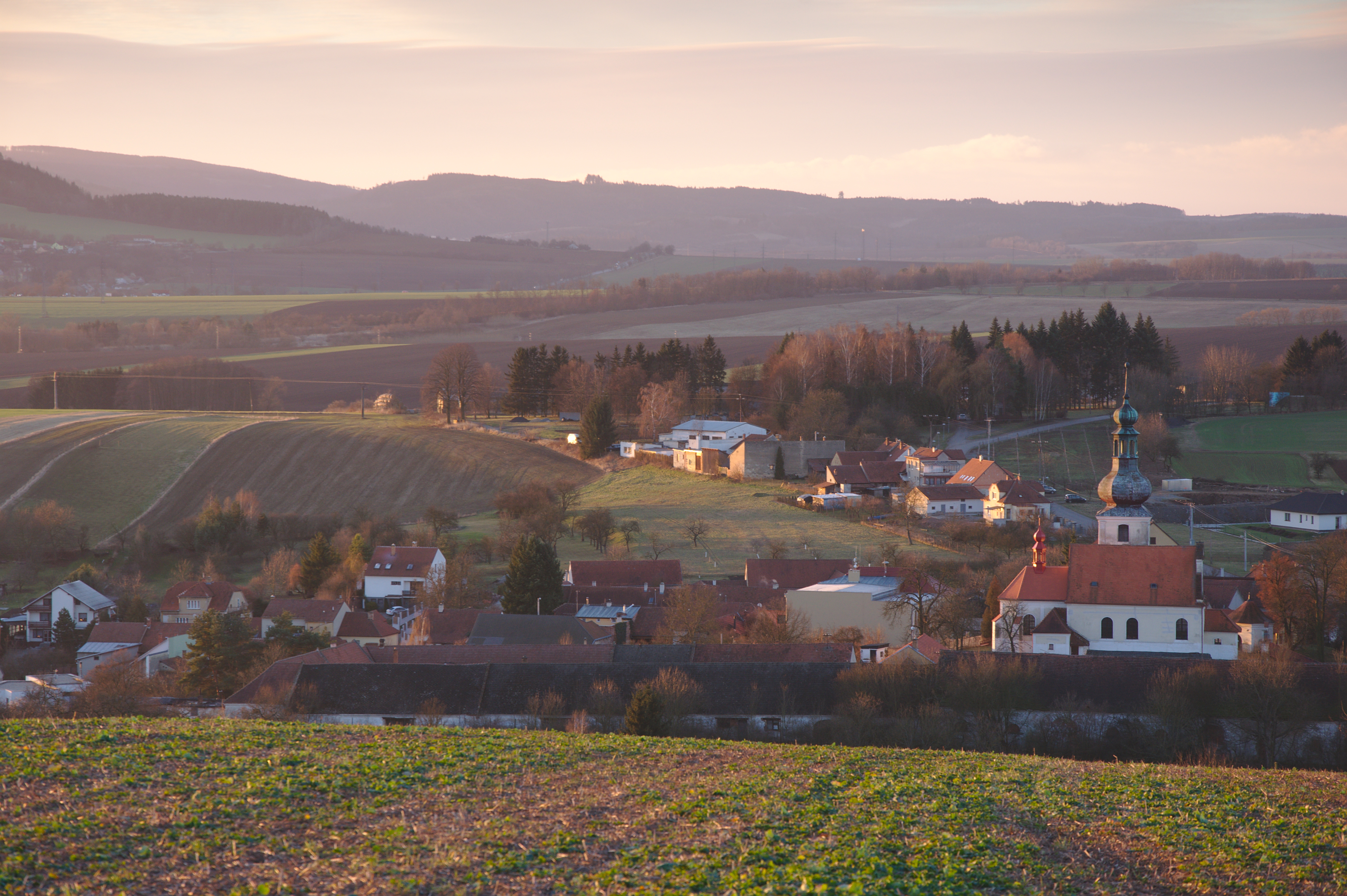
- View from the north

- Flag Coat of arms

- Location in the Czech Republic
- Coordinates: 49°29′49″N 16°34′28″E
- Country: Czech Republic
- Region: South Moravian
- District: Blansko
- First mentioned: 1043

Area
  - Total: 8.04 km^{2} (3.10 sq mi)
- Elevation: 344 m (1,129 ft)

Population (2026-01-01)
  - Total: 705
  - Density: 87.7/km^{2} (227/sq mi)
- Time zone: UTC+1 (CET)
  - Summer (DST): UTC+2 (CEST)
- Postal code: 679 31
- Website: www.sebranice.eu

Sebranice is a municipality and village in Blansko District in the South Moravian Region of the Czech Republic. It has about 700 inhabitants.

Sebranice lies approximately 16 kilometres (10 mi) north of Blansko, 34 km (21 mi) north of Brno, and 168 km (104 mi) south-east of Prague.

== Demographics ==
Historical population
Year	Pop.	±%
1869	888	—
1880	962	+8.3%
1890	983	+2.2%
1900	1,016	+3.4%
1910	922	−9.3%
1921	945	+2.5%
1930	866	−8.4%
1950	779	−10.0%
1961	775	−0.5%
1970	701	−9.5%
1980	693	−1.1%
1991	577	−16.7%
2001	573	−0.7%
2011	618	+7.9%
2021	627	+1.5%
Source: Censuses

== Notable people ==
- František Kovář (1888–1969), patriarch of the Czechoslovak Hussite Church
