= Bedřichovice =

- Village
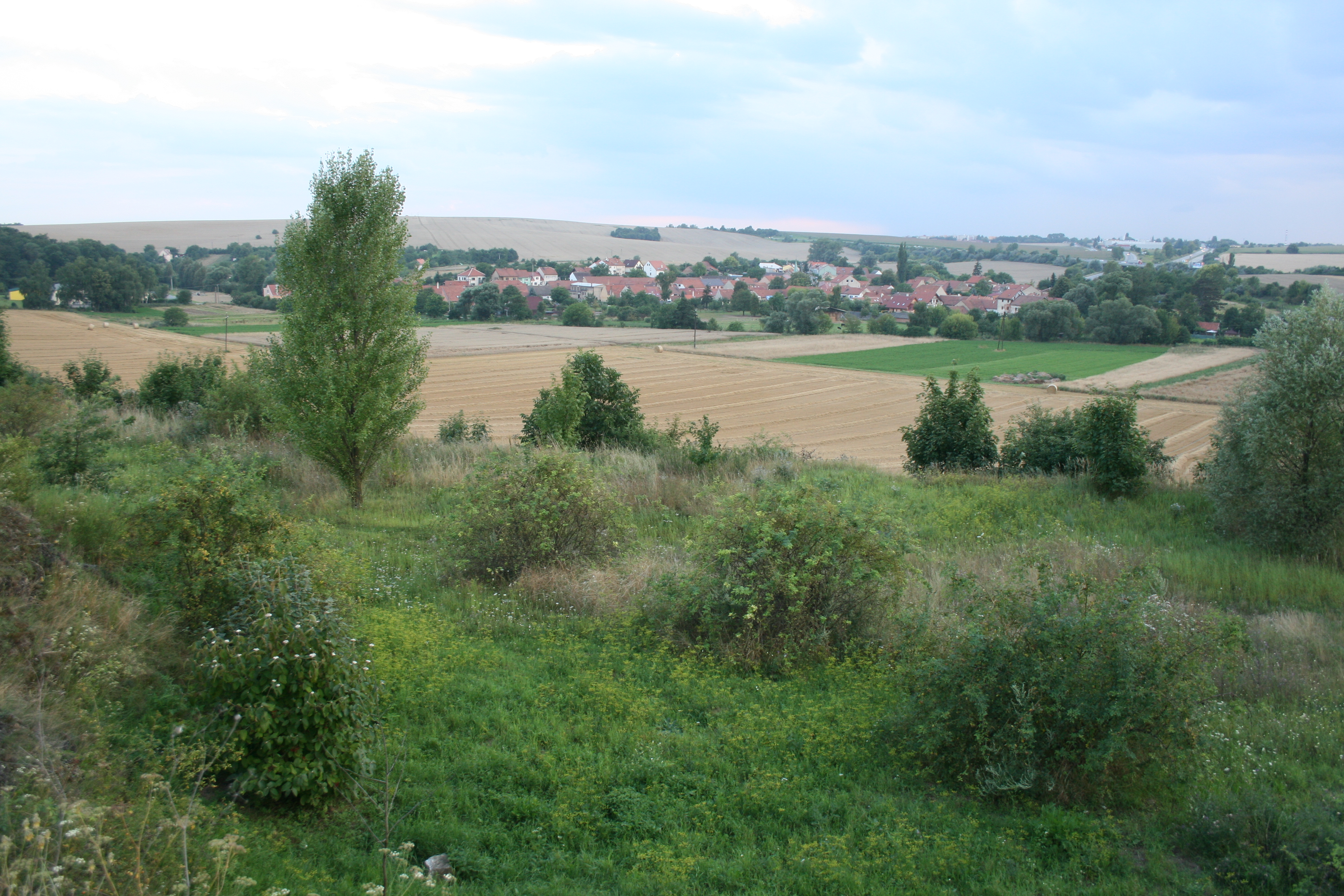
- General view of the village

- Location in the Czech Republic
- Coordinates: 49°10′49″N 16°43′14″E
- Country: Czech Republic
- Region: South Moravian
- District: Brno-Country
- Municipality: Šlapanice
- First mentioned: 1306

Area
  - Total: 1.75 km^{2} (0.68 sq mi)
- Elevation: 229 m (751 ft)

Population (2021)
  - Total: 339
  - Density: 194/km^{2} (502/sq mi)
- Time zone: UTC+1 (CET)
  - Summer (DST): UTC+2 (CEST)
- Postal code: 664 51

Bedřichovice is a village and municipal part of Šlapanice in Brno-Country District in the South Moravian Region of the Czech Republic. It has about 300 inhabitants.

== Geography ==
Bedřichovice is located in the northern part of the Šlapanice territory, about 3 kilometres (2 mi) east of Brno. It lies in the Dyje–Svratka Valley. It lies on the right bank of the Říčka Stream.

== Demographics ==
Historical population
Year	Pop.	±%
1869	277	—
1880	235	−15.2%
1890	324	+37.9%
1900	308	−4.9%
1910	326	+5.8%
1921	321	−1.5%
1930	345	+7.5%
1950	374	+8.4%
1961	374	+0.0%
1970	373	−0.3%
1980	327	−12.3%
1991	278	−15.0%
2001	308	+10.8%
2011	338	+9.7%
2021	339	+0.3%
Source: Censuses
