= Vestec (Náchod District) =

- Municipality
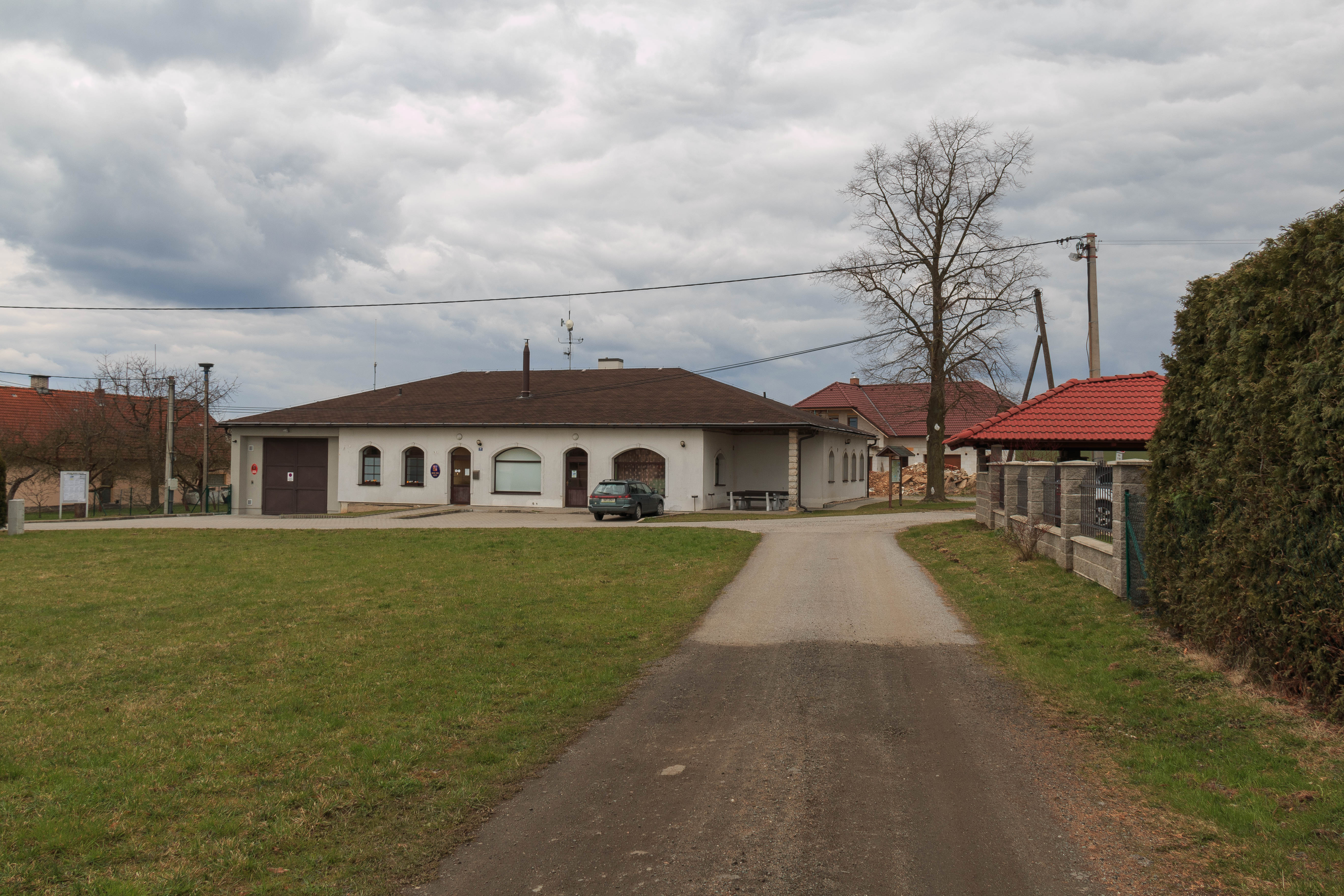
- Municipal office

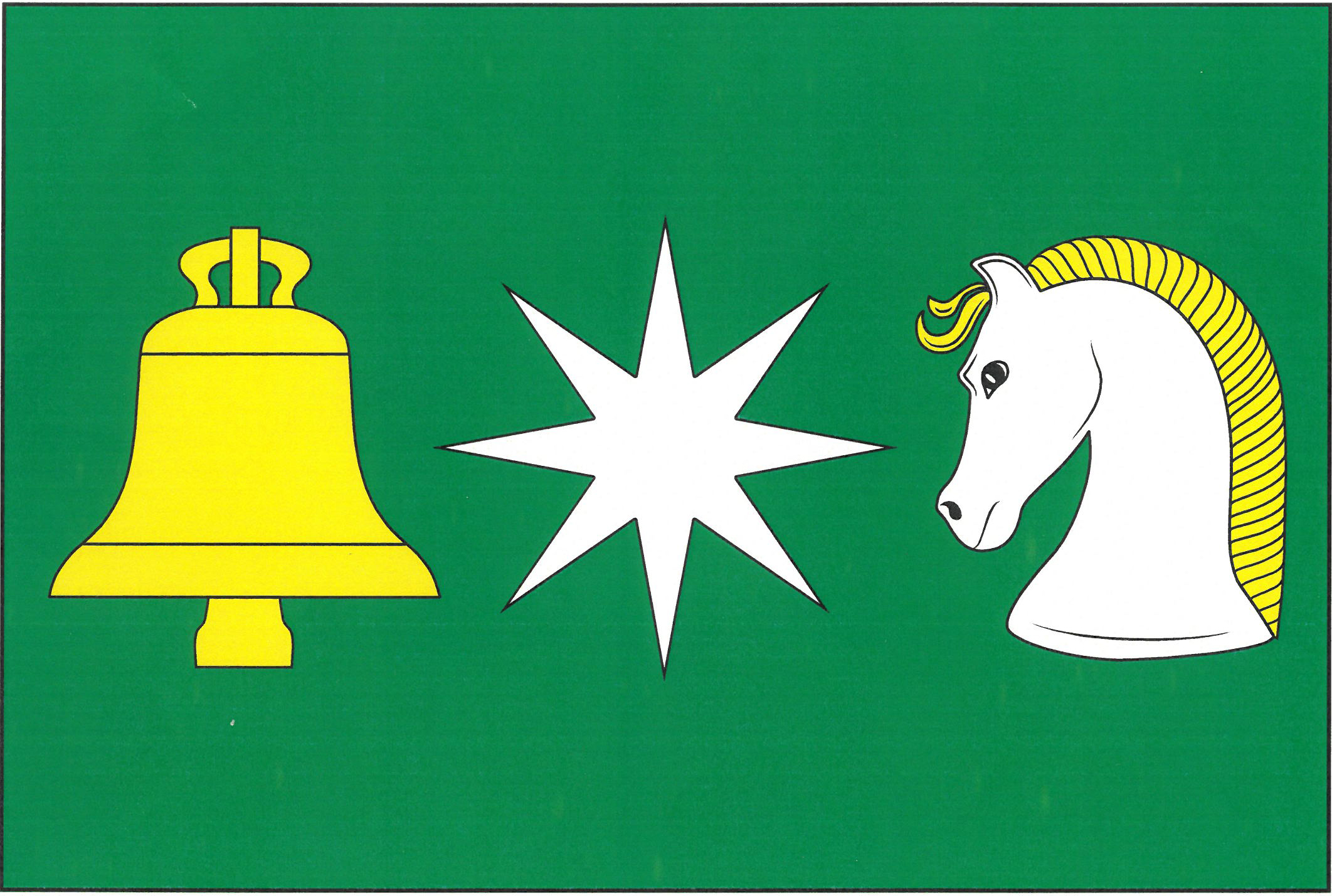
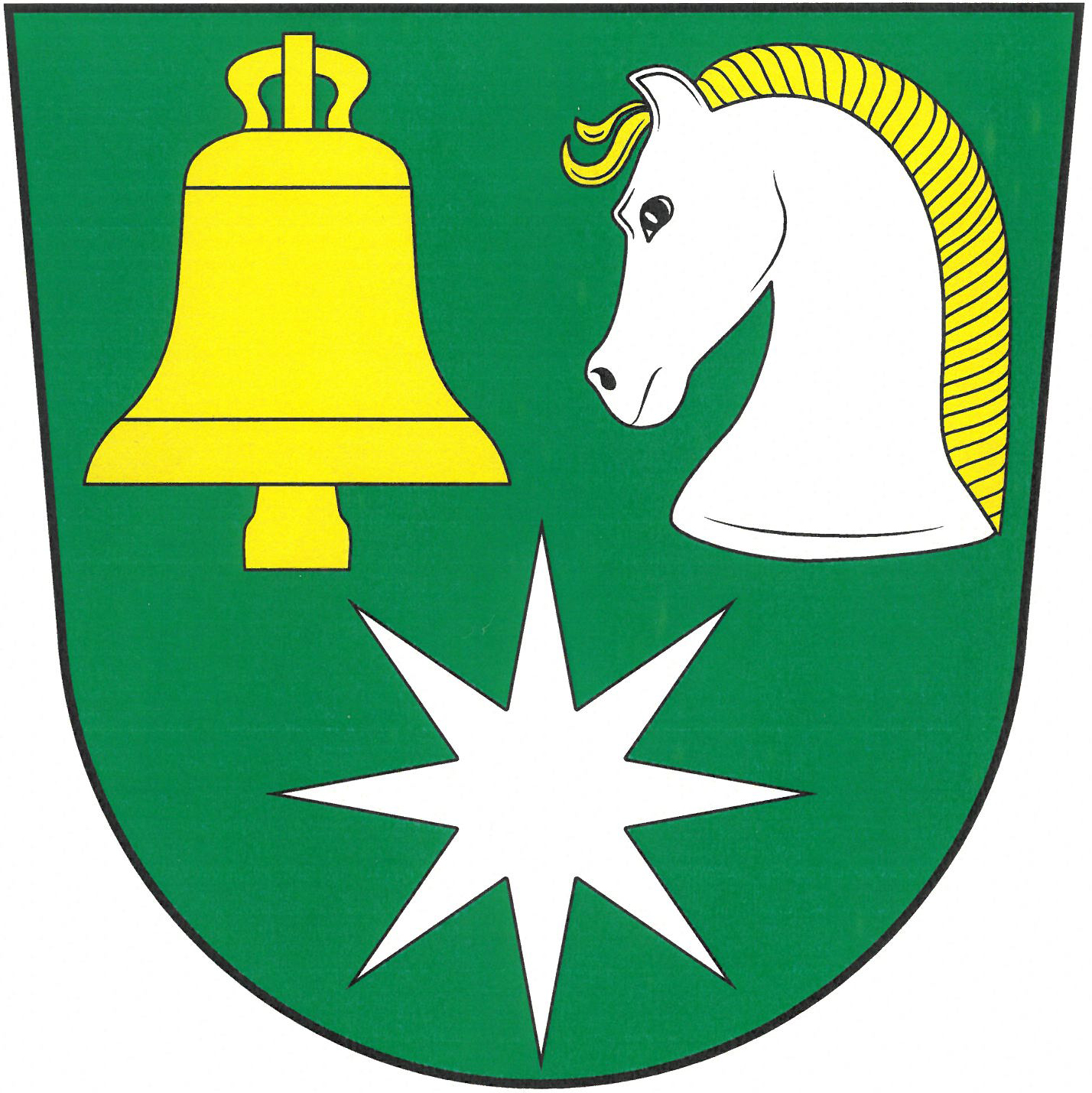
- Flag Coat of arms

- Location in the Czech Republic
- Coordinates: 50°25′19″N 16°1′17″E
- Country: Czech Republic
- Region: Hradec Králové
- District: Náchod
- First mentioned: 1452

Area
  - Total: 3.93 km^{2} (1.52 sq mi)
- Elevation: 280 m (920 ft)

Population (2026-01-01)
  - Total: 191
  - Density: 48.6/km^{2} (126/sq mi)
- Time zone: UTC+1 (CET)
  - Summer (DST): UTC+2 (CEST)
- Postal code: 552 05
- Website: www.obecvestec.eu

Vestec is a municipality and village in Náchod District in the Hradec Králové Region of the Czech Republic. It has about 200 inhabitants.

== Administrative division ==
Vestec consists of three municipal parts (in brackets population according to the 2021 census):

- Vestec (125)
- Hostinka (14)
- Větrník (43)

== Demographics ==
Historical population
| Year | Pop. | ±% |
|---|---|---|
| 1869 | 470 | — |
| 1880 | 475 | +1.1% |
| 1890 | 440 | −7.4% |
| 1900 | 415 | −5.7% |
| 1910 | 402 | −3.1% |
| 1921 | 360 | −10.4% |
| 1930 | 307 | −14.7% |
| 1950 | 252 | −17.9% |
| 1961 | 178 | −29.4% |
| 1970 | 159 | −10.7% |
| 1980 | 133 | −16.4% |
| 1991 | 125 | −6.0% |
| 2001 | 115 | −8.0% |
| 2011 | 145 | +26.1% |
| 2021 | 182 | +25.5% |
Source: Censuses

== Notable people ==
- Arnošt of Pardubice (1297–1364), Archbishop of Prague
