= Sigismund Albicus =

Czech medical doctor, lawyer and archbishop (c. 1360–1427)

- Titular Archbishop of Caesarea in Palaestina
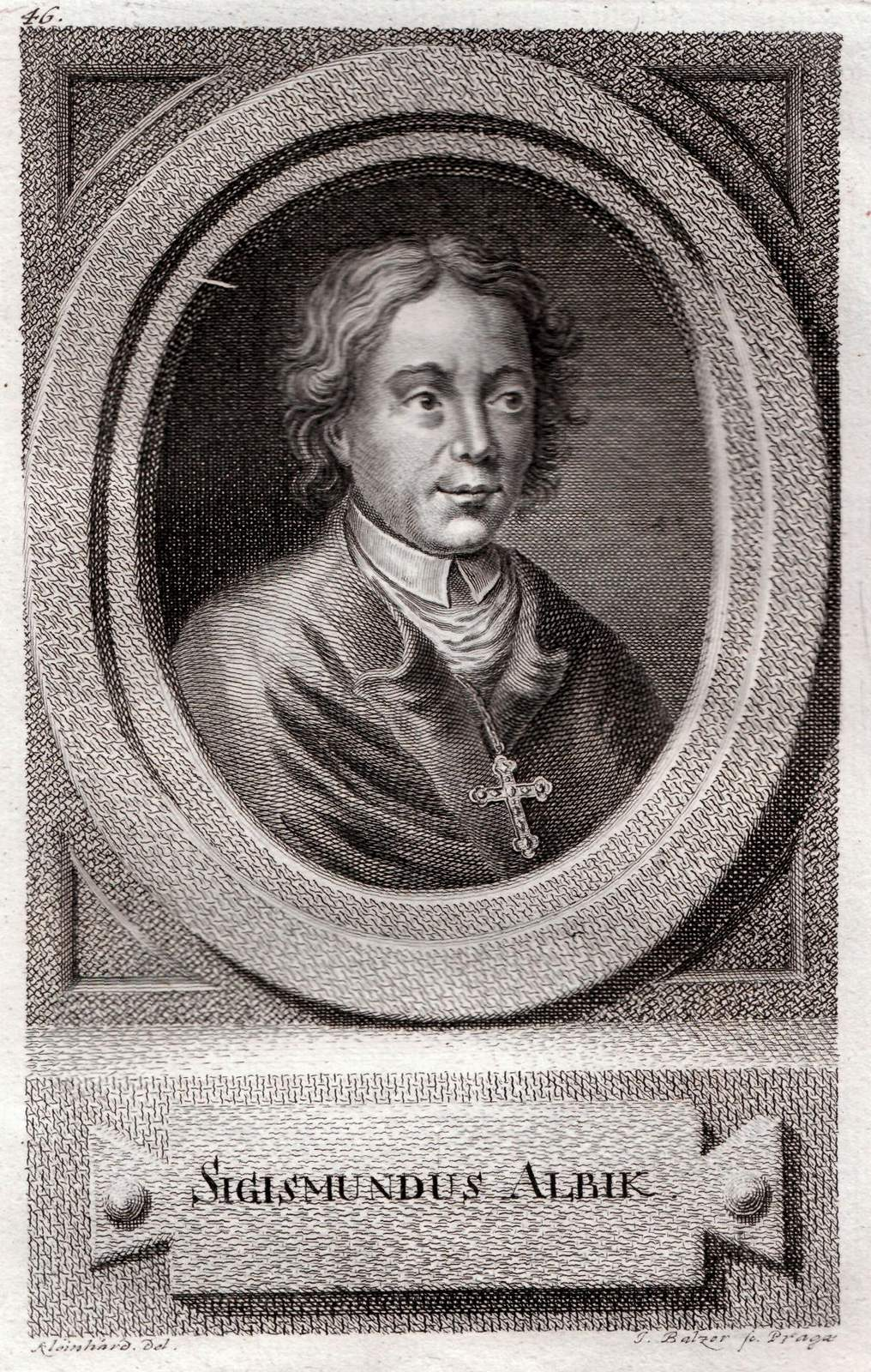
- Native name: Zikmund Albík
- Church: Catholic Church
- See: Caesarea in Palaestina
- In office: 12 February 1413 – 23 August 1437
- Successor: Zweder van Culemborg
- Previous post: Archbishop of Prague (1412)

Personal details
- Born: Zikmund Albík z Uničova; 1360 Uničov, Moravia, Bohemia, Holy Roman Empire
- Died: 23 August 1427 (aged 66–67) Pozsony, Kingdom of Hungary

Sigismund Albicus (Czech: Zikmund Albík z Uničova) (c. 1360 – 23 July 1427) was a Czech medical doctor, lawyer and Roman Catholic Archbishop of Prague.

== Life ==
Albicus was born at Uničov, Moravia, and entered the University of Prague when quite young, taking his degree in medicine in 1387.

Desiring to pursue the study of civil and canon law with more profit, he went to Italy and received the Doctor's degree in 1404, at Padua.

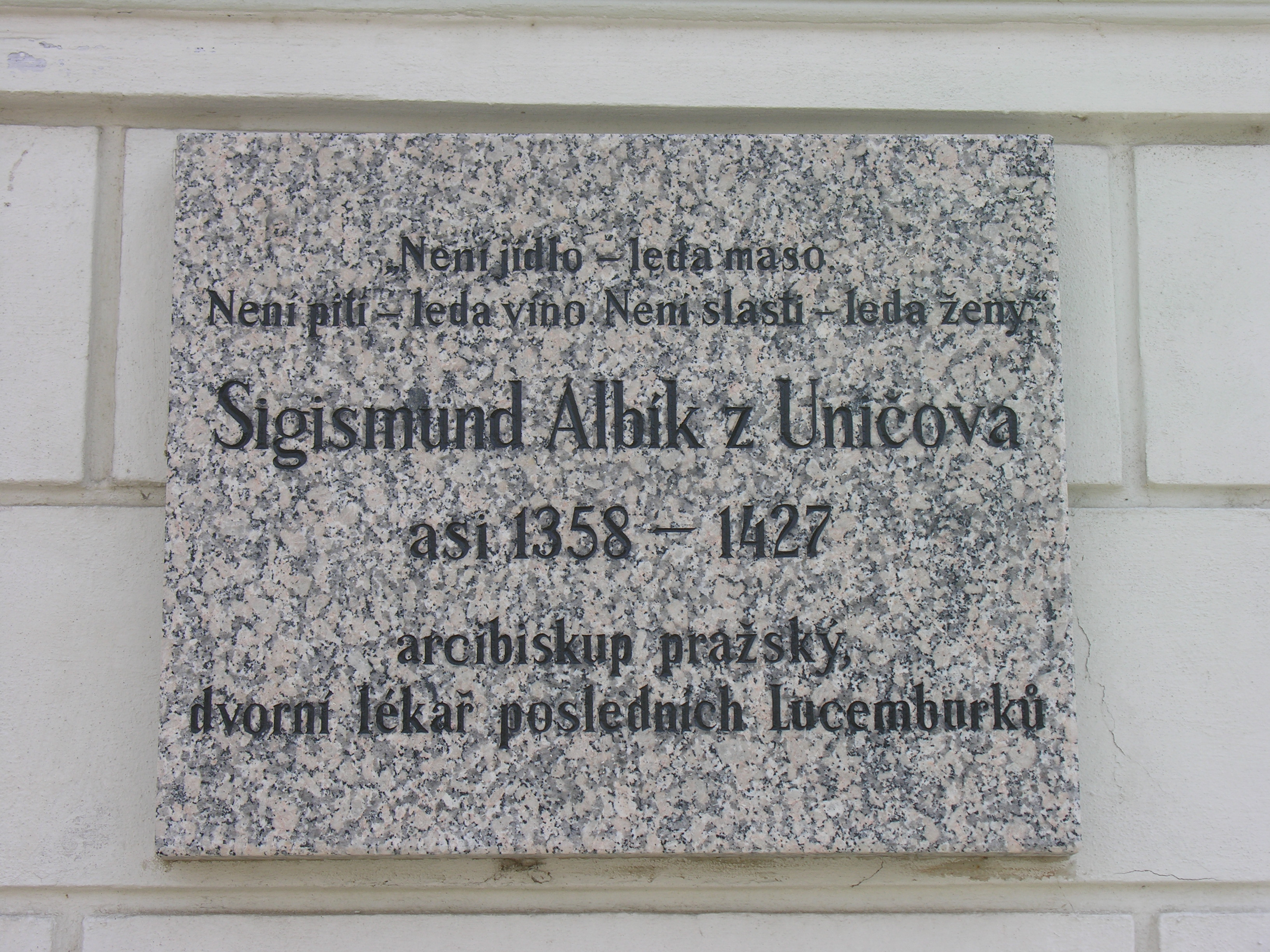
Plaque of Sigismund Albicus in Uničov. There is written in Czech: "There is no other meal than meat. There is no other drink than wine. There is no other pleasure than woman." Sigismund Albík from Uničov about 1358–1457 archbishop of Prague, court physician of last ones of Luxemburg dynasty.

On his return to Prague, he taught medicine for twenty years in the university. He was appointed physician-in-chief to Wenceslaus IV, who recommended him as successor to the archdiocese of Prague, on the death of its incumbent in 1409.

The canons appointed him to the position, although reluctantly. Albicus held it only four years, and when he resigned, in 1413, Conrad of Vechta was elected in his place.

Albicus later received the Priory of Vyšehrad and the title of Archbishop of Caesarea. He was accused of favouring the new doctrines of Jan Hus and John Wycliffe. He retired to Hungary during the Hussite war, and died there, in 1427. He left three works on medical subjects, which were published after his death: Praxis medendi; Regimen Sanitatis; Regimen pestilentiæ (Leipzig, 1484–1487).

| Preceded by Zbyněk Zajíc of Hazmburk | Archbishop of Prague; 1411–1412 | Succeeded by Conrad of Vechta |
