= Tomáš Butta =

Czech patriarch (born 1958)

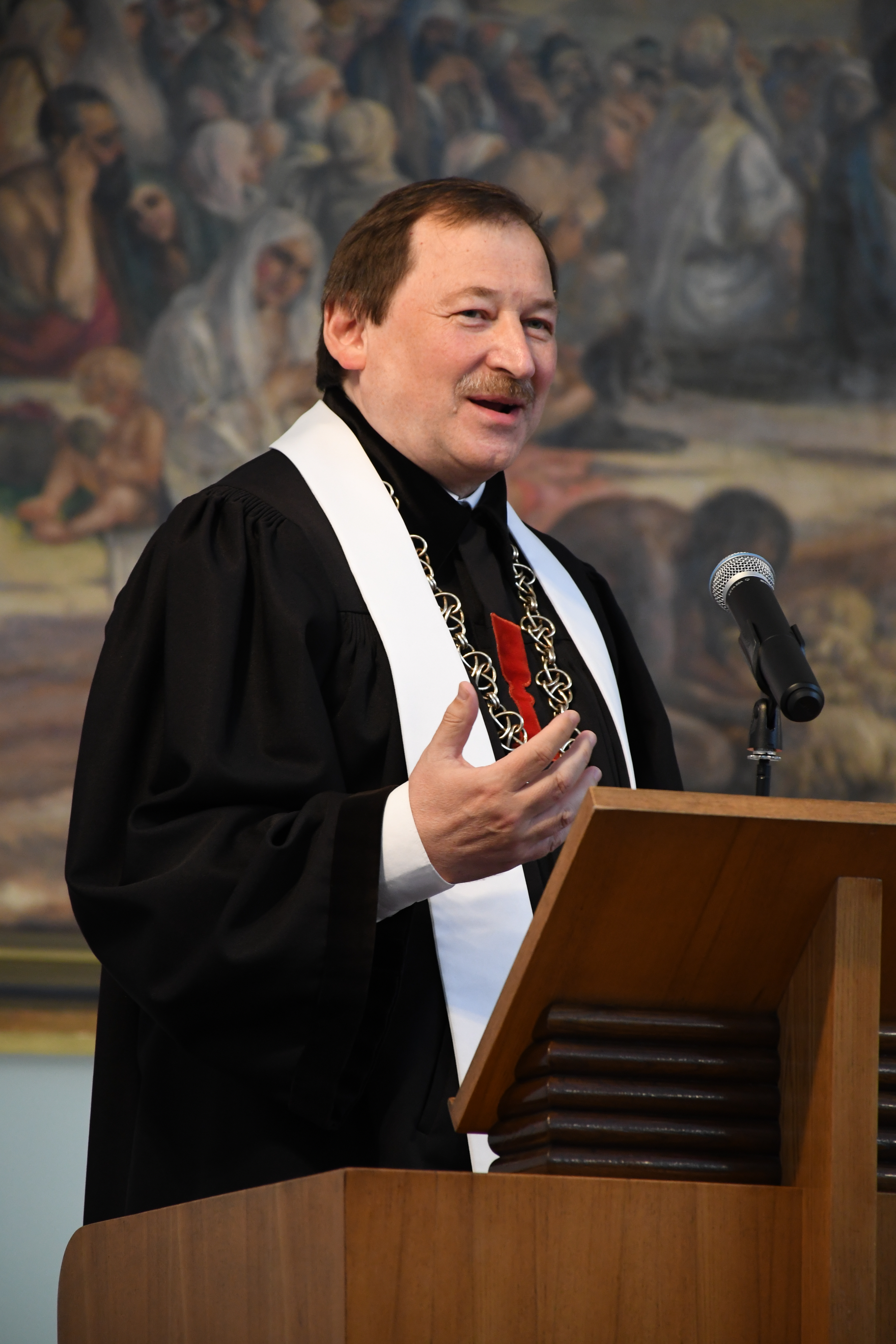
- Born: 12 June 1958; Prague, Czechoslovakia
- Education: Hussite Theological Faculty, Charles University

Tomáš Butta (born 12 June 1958) is a theologian and clergyman who is currently serving as the eighth patriarch of the Czechoslovak Hussite Church.

== Life ==
Tomáš Butta was born in Prague, Czechoslovakia, on June 12, 1958.

After graduating from the Hus Czechoslovak Faculty of Theology in Prague, Butta received the sacrament of priesthood in 1984, and was appointed pastor of both the Czechoslovak Hussite Church and the Hradec Králové diocese. He worked in the religious communities of Semily and Turnov.

In 1997 he acquired his doctorate in theology from Charles University in Prague. In 1999, he was elected Secretary General of the Eighth Council of the Czechoslovak Hussite Church.

On September 23, 2006, he was elected to the position of patriarch of the Czechoslovak Hussite Church, after receiving the required number of votes in the first round. He replaced Jan Schwarz, who had resigned in 2005. On September 28, in the St. Nicholas Church, he was ordained a bishop and subsequently initiated into the office of Patriarch. On September 21, 2013, the Church Electoral Assembly re-elected him for another seven-year term.

On September 28, 2020, Butta completed his second term as Patriarch. Since the Election Assembly could not be held on the planned date due to the COVID-19 pandemic, he was appointed as administrator of the Church from September 29, 2020, still performing all of the tasks of the Patriarch. He would function as administrator of the Church until July 6, 2021.

On June 19, 2021, Butta was elected Patriarch of the Czechoslovak Hussite Church for the third time at the election assembly in the Hus congregation in Prague. On July 6, on the feast of Master Jan Hus, he was officially inaugurated as Patriarch during a service in the Church of St. Nicholas.

== Personal life ==
Butta is married and has three sons.

He is the author of a number of songs, biblical dramatizations, articles, and professional works.

== Notes ==
Preceded by Jan Schwarz	Patriarch of the Czechoslovak Hussite Church; 2006–present	Succeeded by N/A
