= František Šterc =

Czech footballer

Personal information
- Date of birth: 27 January 1912
- Place of birth: Šlapanice, Austria-Hungary
- Date of death: 31 October 1978 (aged 66)
- Place of death: Brno, Czechoslovakia
- Position: Striker

Youth career
- SK Šlapanice

Senior career*
Years	Team	Apps	(Gls)
–1932	SK Šlapanice		
1932–1938	SK Židenice	62	(32)
1938–	SK Šlapanice		

International career
1934–1935	Czechoslovakia	2	(0)
Medal record
Representing Czechoslovakia
Men's Football
FIFA World Cup
Runner-up	1934 Italy
- * Club domestic league appearances and goals

František Šterc (27 January 1912 – 31 October 1978) was a Czech football player.

He played club football for SK Židenice.

He played two matches for the Czechoslovakia national team and was a participant at the 1934 FIFA World Cup.
