= Zbyněk Zajíc of Hazmburk =

Archbishop of Prague

His Excellency Zbyněk Zajíc of Hazmburk
- Archbishop of Prague
- Church: Roman Catholic Church
- Appointed: November 1402
- Predecessor: Olbram (Volfram) of Škvorec
- Successor: Sigismund Albicus

Personal details
- Born: c. 1376 Kingdom of Bohemia (now Czech Republic)
- Died: 28 September 1411 (aged 34–35) Pressburg, Kingdom of Hungary (now Bratislava, Slovakia)
- Buried: St. Vitus Cathedral, Prague
- Denomination: Roman Catholic
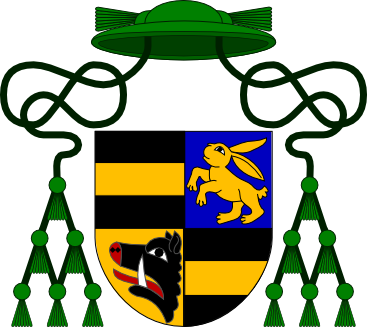
- Coat of arms

Zbyněk Zajíc of Hazmburk or of Hasenburg (Czech: Zbyněk Zajíc z Hazmburka; c. 1376 – 28 September 1411) was a Czech nobleman, and an important representative of the Roman Catholic Church in the Crown of Bohemia. He was the 5th Archbishop of Prague 1403–1411, succeeding Olbram of Škvorec.

While he was initially a supporter of Czech religious reformer Jan Hus, he later strongly opposed his views and reformatory effort.

== Life and career ==
Zbyněk Zajíc came from the influential Czech noble house of Zajíc of Hazmburk. He was born in 1376 (some say 1375) as the oldest son of Vilém Zajíc of Hazmburk and Anna of Slavětín and Libochovice. He had five brothers and four sisters. Between 1395 and 1400 he possessed a sixth of the Hazmburk Castle.

Zbyněk was a knight, capable leader, and military adviser to the Bohemian King Wenceslaus IV. Originally at the court of Wenceslaus, he then moved to position as provost at Mělník, in 1390 (at the age of 15). He was a military leader, as he led, on the King's orders, the expansion into Bavaria.

He was also a typical representative of the corrupt establishment in the Catholic Church. Although he wasn't a priest and was without serious education, thanks to his noble origin he became the provost in Mělník in 1390 (at the age of 15). He later became the canon (priest) of Vyšehrad in 1400, and finally the Archbishop of Prague in November 1402 (at age twenty-six).

Originally Zbyněk respected well educated Jan Hus, tolerating and protecting him in his reforming endeavour despite the complaining clergy. In 1403 he became the Archbishop. At that time he required Hus to report to him "absences or deviations of law". This allowed Hus and others among Wycliffe's sympathizers to spread reformed ideas. At the beginning of 1409 Archbishop Zbyněk entered into conflict with King Wenceslaus concerning the council in Pisa. While the king approved of the council and the newly elected Antipope Alexander V, Archbishop Zbyněk remained loyal to Pope Gregory XII. When Wenceslaus had refused to recognise any of the three existing popes (at the time) and wished to await the outcome of the council at Pisa, Zbyněk had put an interdict (Czech: klatba) on "all who obeyed the king", meaning Bohemia in general.

Under pressure from the pope and the clergy, Zbyněk required the books of Wycliffe and others to be condemned. In September 1409 he acknowledged antipope Alexander V and, with papal blessing, he ordered the heretical works burned, and proclaimed an interdict against Hus. King then condemned Wycliffe as well and forbade preaching outside of churches, including those held by Hus at Betlémská kaple. On 16 July 1410 Zbyněk ordered that the confiscated works of Wycliffe be burned, at his court in Prague. Thereafter he had to flee to save his life from an angry mob. University students were singing satirical songs such as: "Zbyněk Bishop "Alphabet" burnt the books, without knowing what they are about" (Zbyněk biskup abeceda spálil knihy, a nevěda, co je v nich napsáno), ridiculing the archbishop's illiteracy.

King Wenceslaus required him to end the interdict and replace the destroyed books; Zbyněk refused and so the king stopped his income. Zbyněk Zajíc refused to give in and repeated the interdict, which led Wenceslaus to confiscate all the church treasures. After the intervention of Emperor Sigismund, the younger brother of Wenceslaus, the archbishop restored his former relationship to the King. Still, Zbyněk Zajíc did not feel safe in Prague and so he planned to travel to the Kingdom of Hungary. On the way he fell ill and died in Prešpurk, today's Bratislava.

Only after ending of the Hussite Wars his remains could be translated and buried (1436) at the St. Vitus Cathedral in Prague.

Catholic Church titles
Preceded by Olbram of Škvorec (Mikuláš Puchník z Černic died before consecration)	Archbishop of Prague; 1403–1411	Succeeded by Sigismund Albicus
