= Antonín Brus of Mohelnice =

Moravian Archbishop

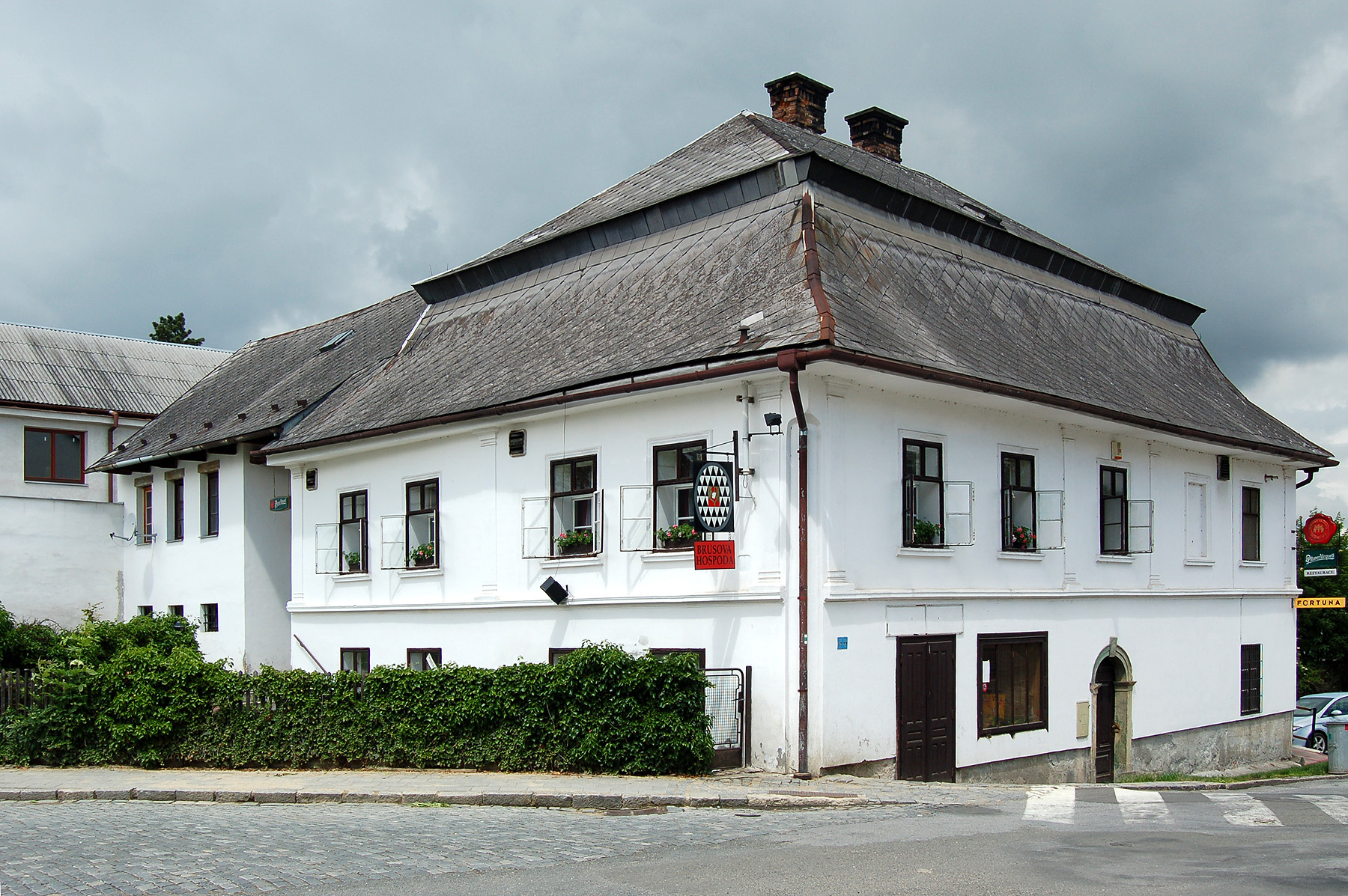
Brus' Pub commemorates personality of Antonín Brus in his birthplace.

Antonín Brus of Mohelnice (Czech: Antonín Brus z Mohelnice, German: Anton Brus von Müglitz; 13 February 1518 – 28 August 1580) was a Moravian Archbishop of Prague.

== Life ==
Brus was born on 13 February 1518 in Mohelnice in Moravia.

After receiving his education at Prague he joined the Knights of the Cross with the Red Star, an ecclesiastical order established in Bohemia in the thirteenth century. After his ordination to the priesthood Emperor Ferdinand I appointed him chaplain of the Austrian army, in which capacity he served during the Turkish war (1542–45).

He was elected Grand Master General of his order in 1552, when he was only 34 years of age. In 1558 he became Bishop of Vienna; in 1561 the emperor made him Archbishop of Prague, a see which had remained vacant since 1421 when Archbishop Conrad abandoned his flock and entered the Hussite camp. During the intervening years the archdiocese was governed by administrators elected by the cathedral chapter.

Before Archbishop Brus took possession of his see, Emperor Ferdinand I, who was also King of Bohemia, sent him as Bohemian legate to the Council of Trent (1562). Besides other ecclesiastical reforms, he urged the archbishop to advocate the expediency of permitting the Utraquists, or Calixtines, of Bohemia and adjoining countries to receive the Eucharist under both species; he hoped that after this concession many of the Utraquists would return to the Catholic Church. The archbishop was assisted in his endeavours by the imperial delegate from Hungary, George Draskovich, Bishop of Funfkirchen (Pécs), and by Baumgärtner, the delegate of Duke Albrecht V of Bavaria. Brus could not be present at the twenty-first and the twenty-second sessions of the Council, during which this petition of the emperor was discussed. The majority of the fathers of Trent considered it beyond their power to grant the privilege of lay communion under both kinds and referred the matter to Pope Pius IV, who, in a Brief dated 16 April 1564, granted the petition, with certain restrictions, to the subjects of the emperor and of Duke Albrecht of Bavaria. The Archbishop of Prague was to empower certain priests to administer the Eucharist in both kinds to such of the laity as desired it. The faithful who wished to take advantage of this privilege were obliged to profess their belief in the Real Presence of the whole Christ in each species, while the priest at the administration of each species pronounced the formula: "Corpus et sanguis Domini nostri Jesu Christi custodiant animam tuam in vitam aeternam. Amen." instead of the customary formula: "Corpus Domini nostri," etc.

The emperor and the archbishop expected results from this papal concession. Thinking that the Utraquist consistory at Prague would at once accept all Catholic doctrine, the emperor put it under the jurisdiction of the archbishop. Both, however, were soon undeceived. The Utraquist consistory was ready to present its sacerdotal candidates to the archbishop for ordination, but there his authority was to end. They refused to permit their candidates for the priesthood to undergo examination on Catholic theology or to give proof of their orthodoxy, and complained to the emperor that the archbishop was infringing upon their rights.

Under the rule of Ferdinand's son Maximilian II, who became emperor in 1564, the gulf that separated the Catholics from the Utraquists was continually widening. In order to publish and put into execution the decrees of the Council of Trent, the archbishop intended to convene a provincial synod at Prague; but Maximilian, fearing to offend the Bohemian nobility of whom the majority were Protestants, withheld his consent. Hampered on all sides, the archbishop and the small body of Catholic nobles, despite their efforts, could only postpone the impending crisis. The Utraquists no longer heeded the archbishop's commands, continued to administer the Holy Eucharist to infants, disregarded many decrees of the Council of Trent, neglected sacramental confession—in a word, were steering straight towards Protestantism. After 1572, the archbishop refused to ordain Utraquist candidates, despite the expostulations of Emperor Maximilian. The death of Maximilian (12 October 1576) brought no relief to the archbishop and his ever-decreasing flock of Catholics.

Brus died on 28 August 1580 in Prague. After the death of Brus, the Catholics of Bohemia continued on their downward course until the victory of Ferdinand II over the Winter King Frederick V at the Battle of the White Mountain near Prague (8 November 1620).
