= Conrad of Vechta =

Chancellor of Kingdom of Bohemia and Archbishop of Prague

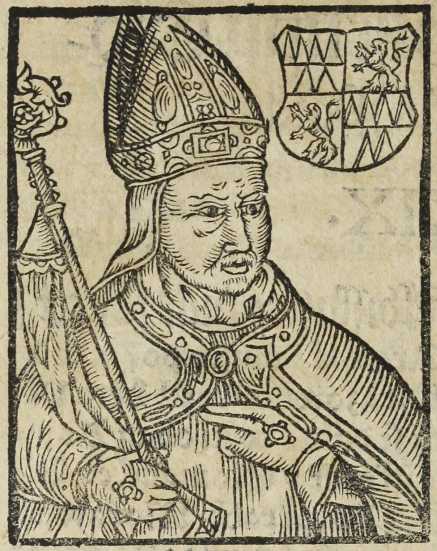
1593 etching of Conrad

Conrad of Vechta (Czech Konrád z Vechty; German Konrad von Vechta) (born c. 1370, possibly in Bremen; died 24 December 1431 in Roudnice nad Labem) was Bishop of Verden (1400–1402/1407), Bishop of Olomouc (1408–1413), Archbishop of Prague (1413–1421), and Master of the Mint (1401–1403) and Chancellor (1405–1412) of the Kingdom of Bohemia.

== Before episcopate ==
It is not certain whether Conrad was a member of the patrician family named von Vechta, living as successful merchants in Bremen, where family members also held positions in the city government, or if Conrad was born in Vechta and therefore epithetised von Vechta in German. However, his brother Konstantin von Vechta held a canonicate at Bremen Cathedral as cathedral provost (Dompropst), presiding the cathedral chapter. This rather substantiates a patrician background, because Bremian canonicates were usually provided for members of patrician families of Bremen or of noble families of the Bremian knightage. Conrad was definitely no member of the comital family of Vechta, which used to be called after its castle Counts of Ravensberg.

Conrad strove for a clerical career. He sided already early with Wenceslaus, King of the Romans, ruling the Holy Roman Empire since 1376, on whose instigation Conrad was provided with a number of prebends. As many North Germans used to study in Prague, Conrad's siding with Wenceslaus, who was simultaneously ruling as King of Bohemia since 1378, may indicate that Conrad had done so too. In 1395 Wenceslaus failed to get Conrad invested as bishop of Verden, whereas Dietrich of Nieheim prevailed. Conrad had earlier been provost of Lüne Nunnery and was then promoted to canon of the Collegiate Church of St. Blaise in Brunswick.

== Provided bishop of Verden ==
In 1400 Pope Boniface IX, on Wenceslaus' instigation, deposed Conrad's provided predecessor Conrad of Soltau, who had so far only been provided bishop of Verden in 1399, but not invested, and provided instead Conrad of Vechta not before 1 May, however, also lacking investiture. Conrad titled himself bishop elect of Verden until 1407. Lacking the elective mandate of the cathedral chapter in Verden upon Aller, it did not recognise his episcopate. However, the pope soon changed his mind again, when the other prince-electors had deposed Wenceslaus as ruler of the Empire in 1400 and replaced him by King Rupert, who in May 1401 had accepted the deposed Conrad of Soltau, a native of the Prince-Bishopric of Verden, as legitimate and invested him with the princely regalia as prince-bishop. Boniface IX thus also confirmed Conrad of Soltau as canonical bishop of Verden in autumn 1402.

== Later offices ==
In 1410 Konstantin von Vechta followed Conrad to Prague, succeeding him as provost of Mělník's Ss. Peter and Paul Church, which was combined with a canonicate at St. Vitus Cathedral, Prague.

On 28 July 1419 Conrad crowned Sigismund of Luxembourg as King of Bohemia. Conrad took the side of the Hussites during the Hussite Wars, despite remaining a Catholic prelate, and was deposed as archbishop by the Roman Curia.

== Art patronage ==
Conrad was the probable original owner of a richly illuminated manuscript Bible, now known as the Antwerp Bible from its survival in the Museum Plantin-Moretus, Antwerp.

== Notes ==
Conrad of Vechta Born: ca. 1370 possibly in Bremen Died: 24 December 1431 in Roudnice nad Labem
Catholic Church titles
Regnal titles
Preceded by Dietrich of Nieheim	provided bishop of Verden as Conrad II never formally invested prince-bishop, rivalled as such by Conrad III since May 1401; 1400–1402	Succeeded by Conrad of Soltau as Conrad III
Catholic Church titles
Preceded by Vladislav Lacek z Kravař	Bishop of Olomouc/Olmütz as Conrad II; 1408–1413	Vacant Title next held by John of Bucca, the Iron with Václav Králík (Wenceslaus Gerard) z Buřenic as intermittent administrator
Vacant Title last held by Sigismund Albicus	Archbishop of Prague as Conrad I joined Hussite movement in 1421, papally deposed in 1424; 1413–1424	Vacant Title next held by Antonín Brus of Mohelnice with John of Bucca, the Iron as intermittent administrator
hu
took de facto function in Hussite church	Hussite archbishop of Prague; 1421–1431	Vacant Title next held by John of Rokycan already as vicar general since 1431
