= Šlapanice =

- Town
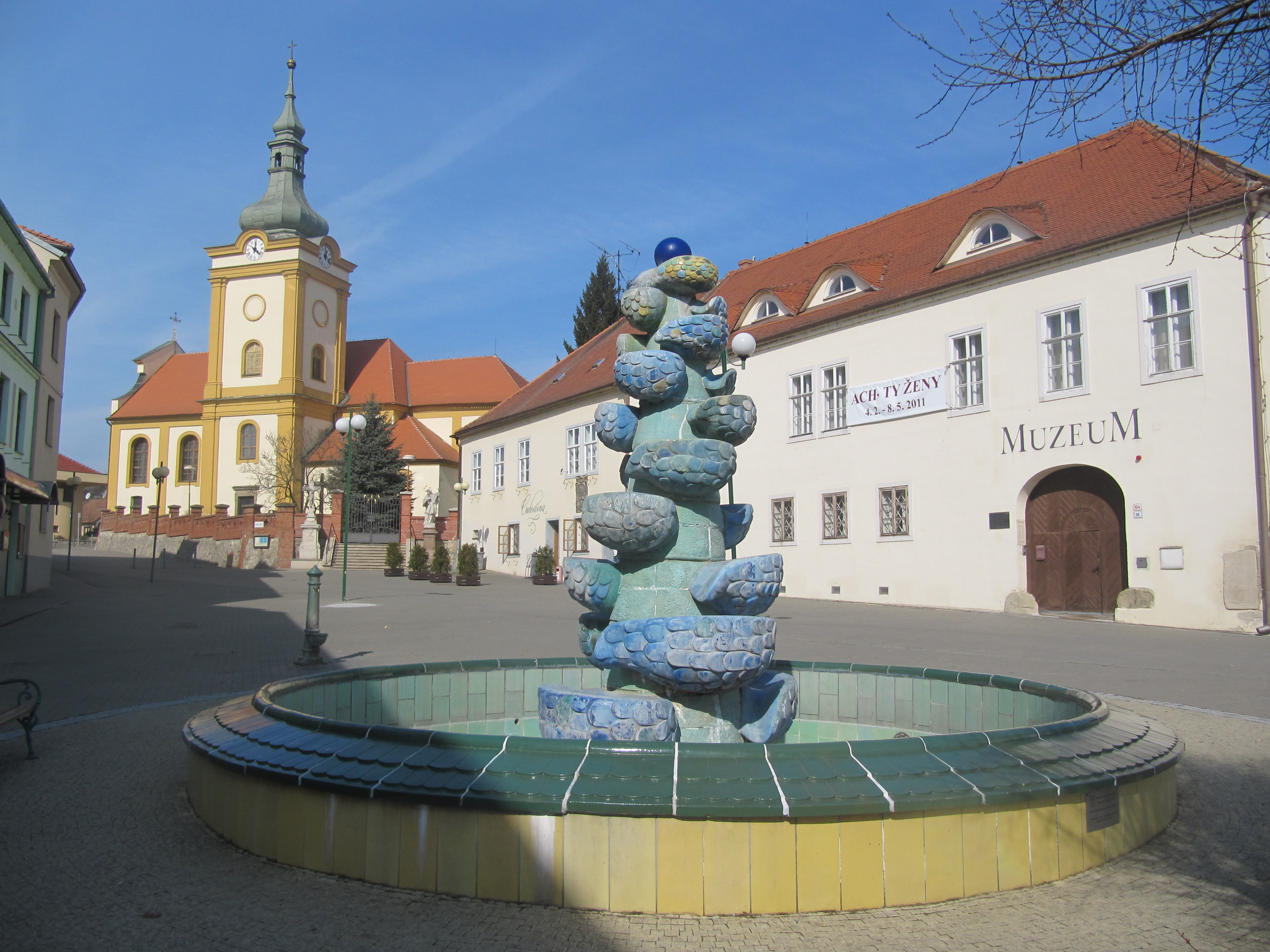
- Main square with a museum and the Church of the Assumption of the Virgin Mary

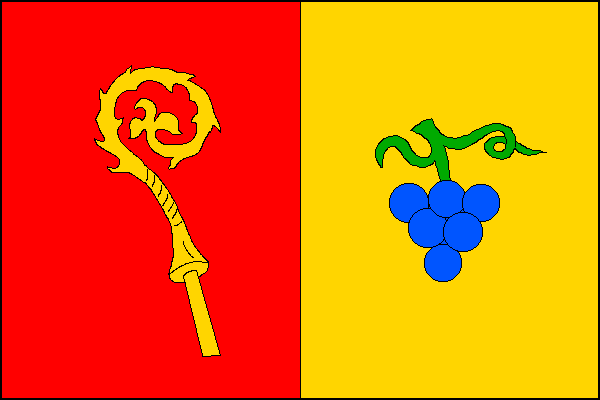
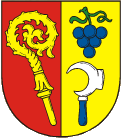
- Flag Coat of arms

- Location in the Czech Republic
- Coordinates: 49°10′7″N 16°43′38″E
- Country: Czech Republic
- Region: South Moravian
- District: Brno-Country
- First mentioned: 1235

Government
  - Mayor: Michaela Trněná (STAN)

Area
  - Total: 14.65 km^{2} (5.66 sq mi)
- Elevation: 230 m (750 ft)

Population (2026-01-01)
  - Total: 7,940
  - Density: 542/km^{2} (1,400/sq mi)
- Time zone: UTC+1 (CET)
  - Summer (DST): UTC+2 (CEST)
- Postal code: 664 51
- Website: www.slapanice.cz

Šlapanice (Czech pronunciation: [ˈʃlapaɲɪtsɛ]) is a town in Brno-Country District in the South Moravian Region of the Czech Republic. It has about 7,900 inhabitants. The town is located on the Říčka Stream in the Dyje–Svratka Valley. The main landmark is the Church of the Assumption of the Virgin Mary.

== Administrative division ==
Šlapanice consists of five municipal parts (in brackets population according to the 2021 census):

- Šlapanice (7,460)
- Bedřichovice (339)

== Etymology ==
The name Šlapanice is derived from the personal name Šlapán, meaning "the village of Šlapán's people".

== Geography ==
Šlapanice is located about 4 kilometres (2 mi) east of Brno. It lies in a predominantly agricultural landscape in the Dyje–Svratka Valley. The highest point is at 292 m (958 ft) above sea level. The Říčka Stream flows through the town.

== History ==
The first written mention of Šlapanice is in a deed of the Olomouc Chapter from 1235. The village was founded on an old trade route, from which its wealth flowed, but development was hampered by frequent damage during wars. It was allegedly plundered by the Tatars in 1241. The village was then sacked in 1449 during a campaign against the monastery in Rajhrad. It suffered further significant damage during the siege of Brno by the army of Matthias Corvinus in 1468–1469 and again in 1470. In 1643–1645, during the siege of Brno during the Thirty Years' War, Šlapanice was repeatedly looted. The village was further devastated in 1742 by the army of Frederick the Great during the War of the Austrian Succession.

At the beginning of the 17th century, Šlapanice lost its importance and began to stagnate economically, as trade routes diverted towards Brno. In 1677, 1733 and especially in 1757, the settlement was badly damaged by fires. From the 17th century until the establishment of an independent municipality in 1848, Šlapanice was divided into three parts with different owners. The municipality was promoted to a town in 1965.

== Demographics ==
Historical population

Year	Pop.	±%
1869	2,096	—
1880	2,150	+2.6%
1890	2,895	+34.7%
1900	3,226	+11.4%
1910	4,019	+24.6%

Year	Pop.	±%
1921	4,191	+4.3%
1930	4,769	+13.8%
1950	5,075	+6.4%
1961	5,387	+6.1%
1970	5,410	+0.4%

Year	Pop.	±%
1980	6,841	+26.5%
1991	6,172	−9.8%
2001	6,214	+0.7%
2011	7,109	+14.4%
2021	7,799	+9.7%

Source: Censuses

== Economy ==
The largest employer based in the town's territory is CCI Czech Republic, a branch of IMI plc. It produces valves for the oil, petrochemical and energy industries.

== Transport ==
The D1 motorway from Brno to Ostrava runs around the town.

Šlapanice is located on the railway line Brno–Uherské Hradiště.

== Sights ==
The main landmark of Šlapanice is the Church of the Assumption of the Virgin Mary. It was originally a medieval Romanesque church from the turn of the 12th and 13th centuries, rebuilt in the early Gothic style at the turn of the 13th and 14th centuries and then in the Baroque style in 1753–1755.

A notable building is the former scholaster's house. It is a late Renaissance house with origins in the 13th century, modified in the Baroque style. Before the Battle of Austerlitz, the building served as the headquarters of the Austro-Russian army. Today it houses the Brno Region Museum.

== Notable people ==
- Alois Kalvoda (1875–1934), painter
- František Šterc (1912–1978), footballer
- Vratislav Štěpánek (1930–2013), clergyman and bishop; died here
- Libuše Šafránková (1953–2021), actress
- Lukáš Dostál (born 2000), ice hockey player

== Twin towns – sister cities ==
Šlapanice is twinned with:

- Braine-l'Alleud, Belgium
