= František Kovář =

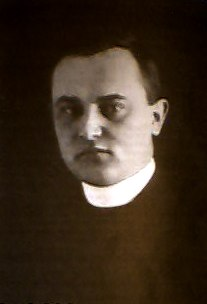
- Born: 2 September 1888; Sebranice, Austria-Hungary
- Died: 12 June 1969; Prague, Czechoslovakia

František Kovář (2 September 1888, in Sebranice – 12 June 1969, in Prague) was the third patriarch of the Czechoslovak Hussite Church.

Hr was formerly a Czech Roman Catholic reformist priest, later a theologian, journalist, translator, editor, spiritual leader of the Czechoslovak Hussite Church.

František Kovář (Doctor of Theology, PhD) was Dean of Hus's Czechoslovak Evangelical Faculty of Theology at Charles University in Prague.

After death of Patriarch Gustav Adolf Procházka in 1942, the position remained vacant until 1946 when František Kovář was elected third bishop-patriarch of the Czechoslovak (Hussite) Church ruling from 1946 to 1961 setting down when he was 73 and Miroslav Novák succeeded him as patriarch. Kovář died in 1969.

Preceded by Gustav Adolf Procházka	Patriarch of the Czechoslovak Hussite Church; 1946–1961	Succeeded by Miroslav Novák
