= Moretus =

Moretus (Moerentorf) is a Flemish family name and may refer to:

== Name ==
- Jan Moretus
- Theodorus Moretus
- Balthasar I Moretus

== Others ==
- Moretus (crater) - a crater in the southern hemisphere of the Moon
- Plantin-Moretus Museum
