= Josef Špak =

Czech clergyman

- Born: 10 July 1929; Litomyšl, Czechoslovakia
- Died: 12 September 2016; Prague, Czech Republic

Josef Špak (10 July 1929 – 12 September 2016) was a Czech clergyman, and from 1994 to 2001, the sixth bishop-patriarch of the Czechoslovak Hussite Church.

He was born in Litomyšl and baptised into the Catholic Church; he later studied theology at the Hus Czechoslovak Evangelical Theological Faculty. While studying there, he met his future wife Tonička, and they married in 1953.

The StB kept a file on him from 1974 to 1989 and for a time he was unable to carry out his pastoral work. He served in the parish of České Budějovice while also working in a foundry.

After Tonička’s death in 1989, he married Hussite pastor Jana Švábenská.

He was elected on 27 August 1994 as patriarch, a position he kept until 2001 to be succeeded by Jan Schwarz.

He is buried at the Church of St. Vitus. Nicholas on the Old Town Square in Prague.

Preceded by Vratislav Štěpánek	Patriarch of the Czechoslovak Hussite Church; 1994–2001	Succeeded by Jan Schwarz
