= Hussite Theological Faculty, Charles University =

Theological faculty in Prague, Czech Republic

Coordinates: 50°2′42″N 14°26′30″E

Hussite Theological Faculty
- Husitská teologická fakulta
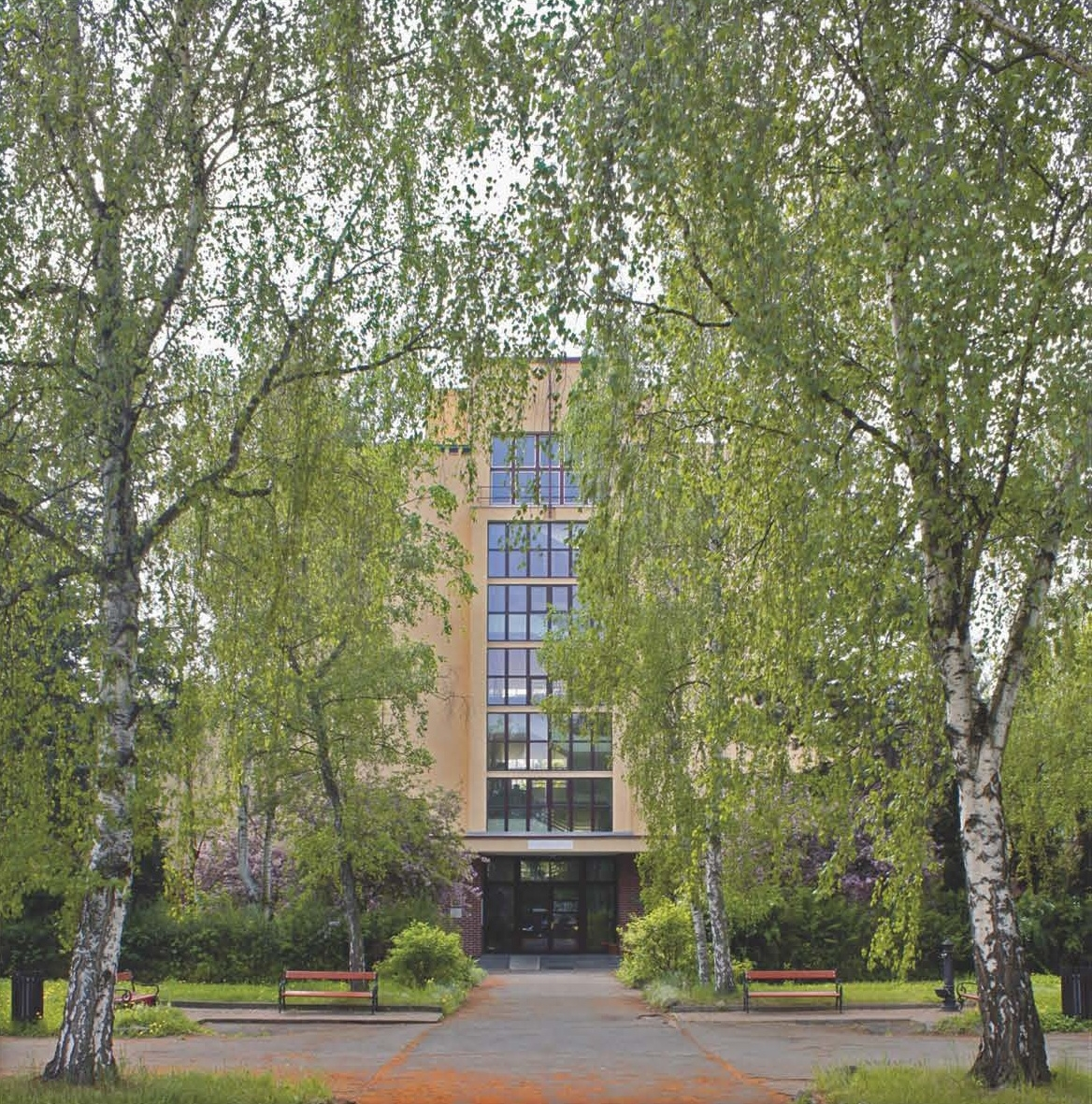
- The main building in Prague-Krč
- Former names: Husova československá evangelická fakulta bohoslovecká
- Motto: Dokončit českou reformaci
- Motto in English: Complete the Czech Reformation
- Type: Faculty
- Established: 1921
- Affiliations: Charles University
- Dean: Kamila Veverková
- Location: Prague, Czech Republic
- Website: www.htf.cuni.cz

The Hussite Theological Faculty (Czech: Husitská teologická fakulta) is one of three theological faculties of Charles University in Prague, Czech Republic. The Faculty was founded with the Czechoslovak Hussite Church which was established at the beginning of 1920 from the Catholic Modernist movement. The Hussite Theological Faculty currently offers theological studies of three Christian convictions – Hussite Theology, Old Catholic Theology and Orthodox Theology.

== History ==
Hus's Faculty was first situated in the sacristy of the Evangelical Church of the Savior in the Old Town of Prague, since 1920 in the former Archbishop's seminary in Clementinum and later at the seat of the Evangelical Church of Czech Brethren in Jungmannova Street. The first dean of the Faculty was Gustav Adolf Skalský (1857–1926).

== Departments ==
- Department of Systematical Theology, Theological Ethics and Theological Philosophy
- Department of Biblical and Jewish Studies
- Department of Practical Theology, Ecumenical Studies and Interpersonal Communication
- Department of Historical Theology and Church History
- Department of Philosophy
- Department of Religious Studies
- Department of Pedagogy
- Department of Psychosocial Sciences and Ethics
- Institute of Eastern Christianity
