= Vratislav Štěpánek =

Czech member of Czech National Council and priest

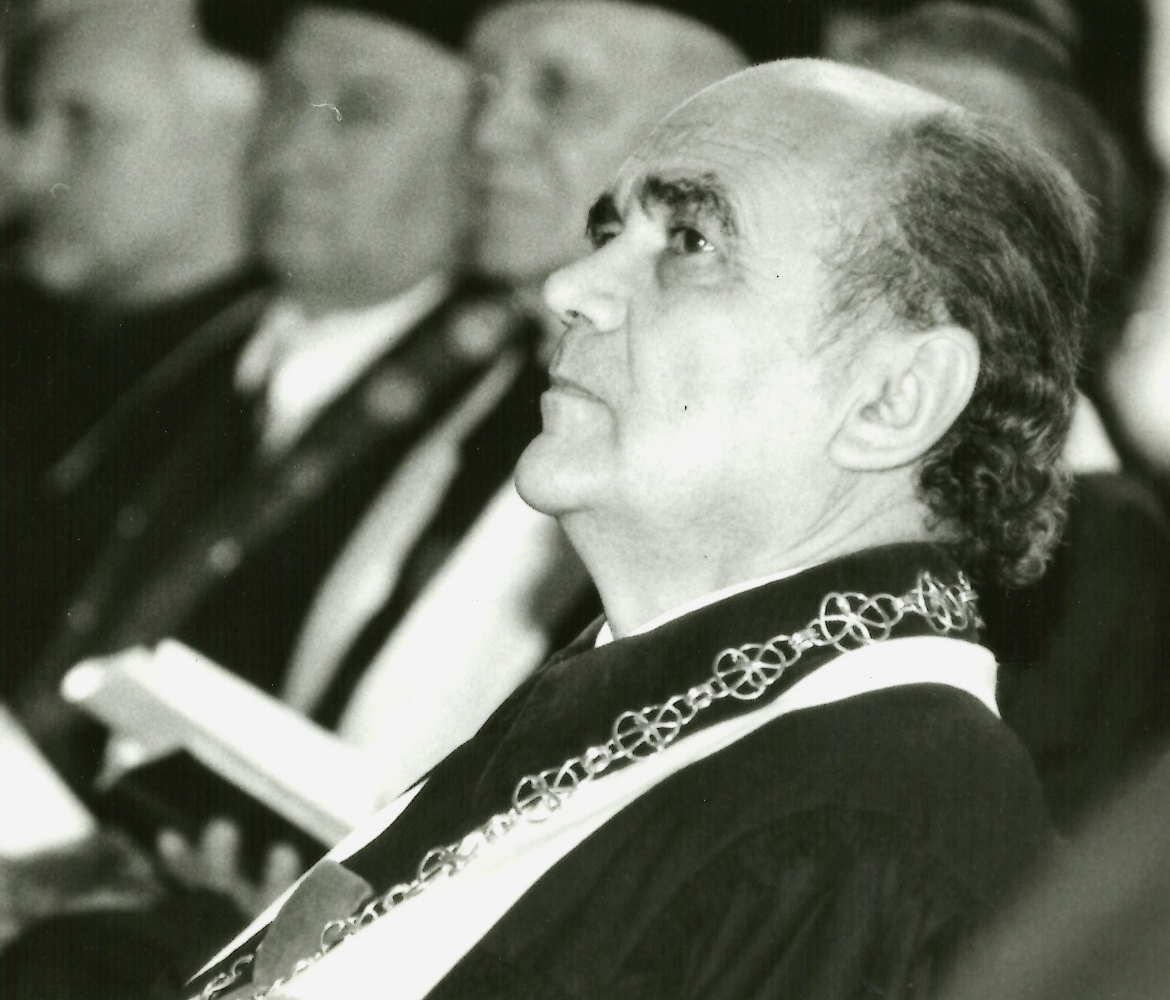
- Born: 18 June 1930; Vrútky, Czechoslovakia
- Died: 21 July 2013; Šlapanice, Czech Republic

Vratislav Štěpánek (18 June 1930, Vrútky – 21 July 2013, Šlapanice) was a clergyman, a bishop, and for a period from 1991 to 1994 the fifth patriarch of the Czechoslovak Hussite Church.

In 1989, he had been assigned as Bishop of the Brno diocese of the church. He kept this position until 1999. On 16 March 1991, he was also elected to the office of patriarch for three years until 1994. He therefore held both offices in parallel during that period. His patriarchy was during the politically and socially aggravated period of the first phase of the post-communist changes in Czechoslovakia.

He was also a Member of the Czech National Council from 1986 to 1990.

Preceded by Miroslav Novák	Patriarch of the Czechoslovak Hussite Church; 1991–1994	Succeeded by Josef Špak
