= Miroslav Novák =

Czech theologian and bishop

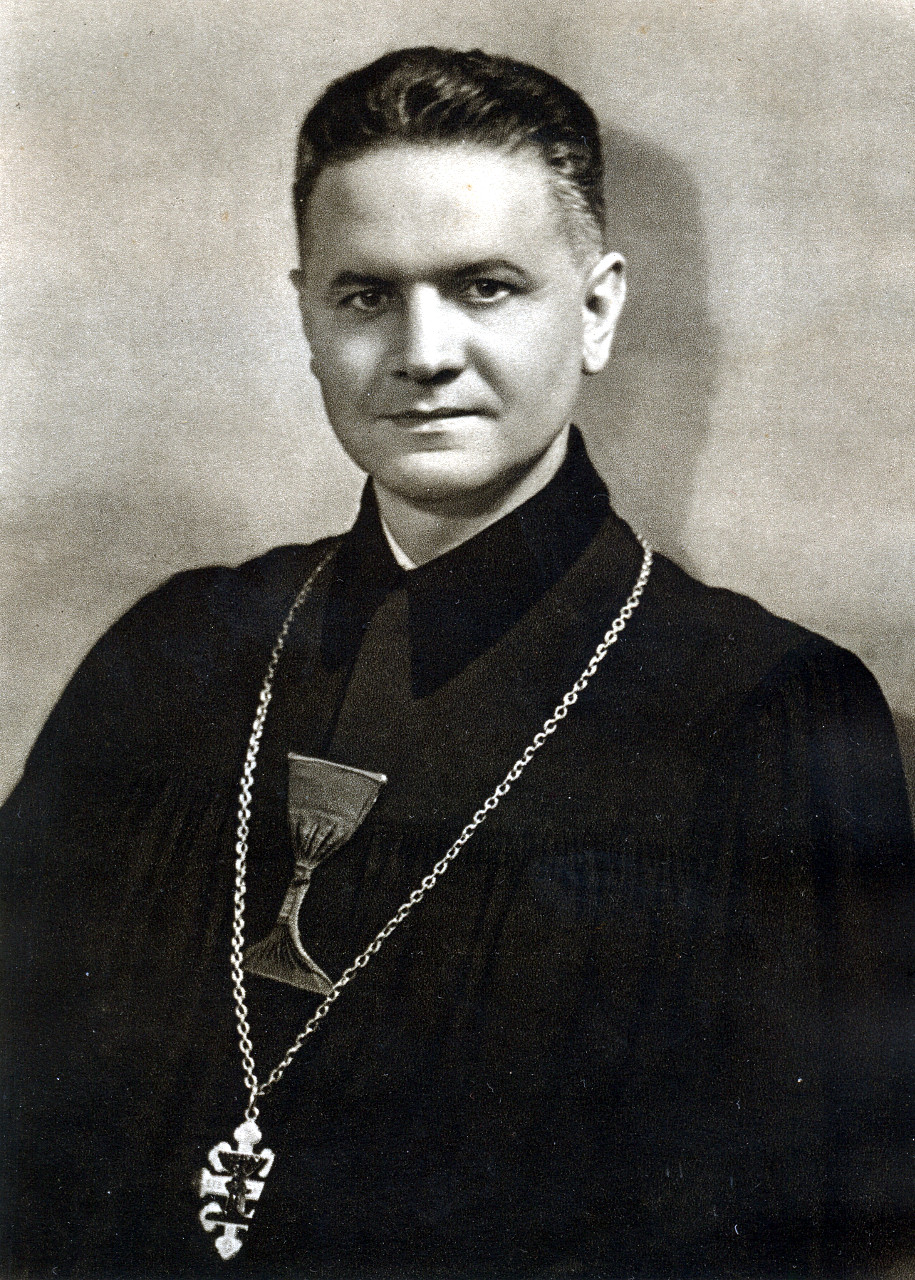
- Born: 26 October 1907; Kyjov, Austria-Hungary
- Died: 5 May 2000; Rouen, France

Miroslav Novák (26 October 1907 – 5 May 2000) was a Czech theologian of the Old Testament, a spiritual bishop and between 1961 and 1990, the patriarch of the Czechoslovak Hussite Church.

Novák, who had both a Doctor of Theology and Doctor of Philosophy, was the Bishop of the Prague Diocese of the church from 1946 to 1961 when he was elected patriarch becoming the fourth patriarch of the church since its establishment in 1920.

In 1990 he set down when he was 83 years old and Vratislav Štěpánek was elected as patriarch.

Patriarch Miroslav Novák spent his last years in Prague and in Rouen, France, where he died on 5 May 2000 at the age of 93.

Preceded by František Kovář	Patriarch of the Czechoslovak Hussite Church; 1961–1990	Succeeded by Vratislav Štěpánek
