= Karel Farský =

Czech Christian priest and religious leader

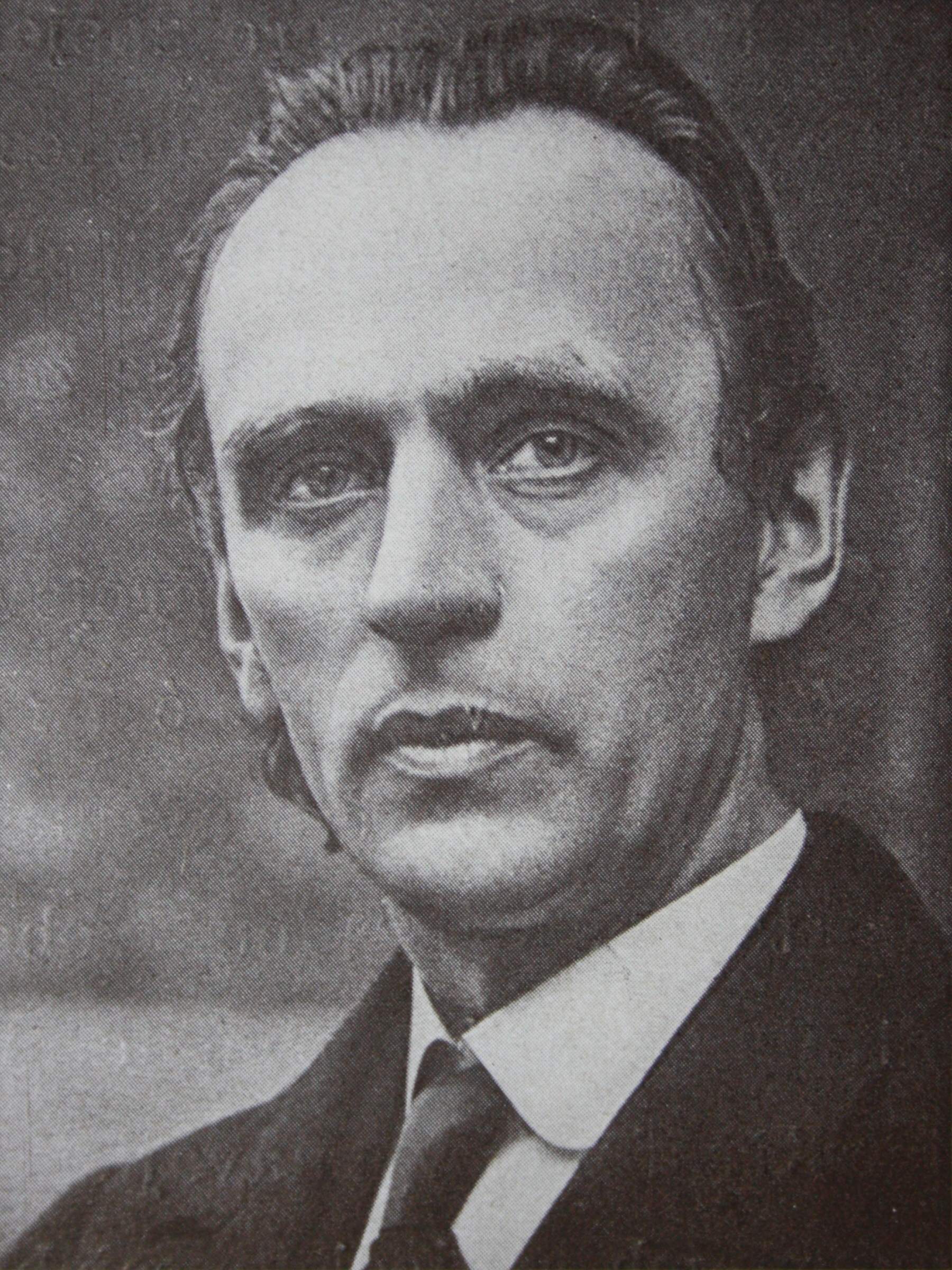
- Born: 26 July 1880; Škodějov, Bohemia, Austria-Hungary
- Died: 12 June 1927 (aged 46); Prague, Czechoslovakia

Karel Farský (26 July 1880 – 12 June 1927) was a Czech Roman Catholic priest, and later founder and first patriarch (1920) of the Czechoslovak Hussite Church. He was Bishop of the West Bohemia (Prague) Diocese of the Czechoslovak Church from 1923 when he became the first patriarch of the church keeping both titles of patriarch and bishop until his death in 1927. He was succeeded by Gustav Adolf Procházka who took office in 1928.

Preceded by N/A	Patriarch of the Czechoslovak Hussite Church; 1924–1927	Succeeded by Gustav Adolf Procházka
