= Jan Schwarz =

Czech theologian (1958–2023)

- Born: 27 September 1958; Třebíč, Czechoslovakia
- Died: 10 November 2023 (aged 65); Třebíč, Czech Republic

Jan Schwarz (27 September 1958 – 10 November 2023) was a Czech theologian, a spiritual leader, journalist and writer. He was the seventh Patriarch of the Czechoslovak Hussite Church from 2001 to 2005.

In 2000, he had been assigned as the press spokesman and in 2001 as the head of the Church of the church. His rule was marked by serious rambling between rival factions some refusing his patriarchy and threatening the division of the church. In 2005, he appeared in front of the church's Episcopal Central Council where he tended his resignation from the patriarchate. He also announced his decision to join the Religious Society of Czech Unitarians. He was also engaged in journalistic and writer activities.

The ecclesiastical council appointed Bishop Mgr. Štěpán Klásek as an interim administrator to prepare for the election of a new patriarch of the church. On 23 September 2006, Tomáš Butta was elected, in the first round of voting with absolute majority as eighth Patriarch of the Church.

== Notes ==
Preceded by Josef Špak	Patriarch of the Czechoslovak Hussite Church; 2001–2006	Succeeded by Tomáš Butta
