= Arnošt of Pardubice =

Archbishop of Prague

- Archbishop of Prague
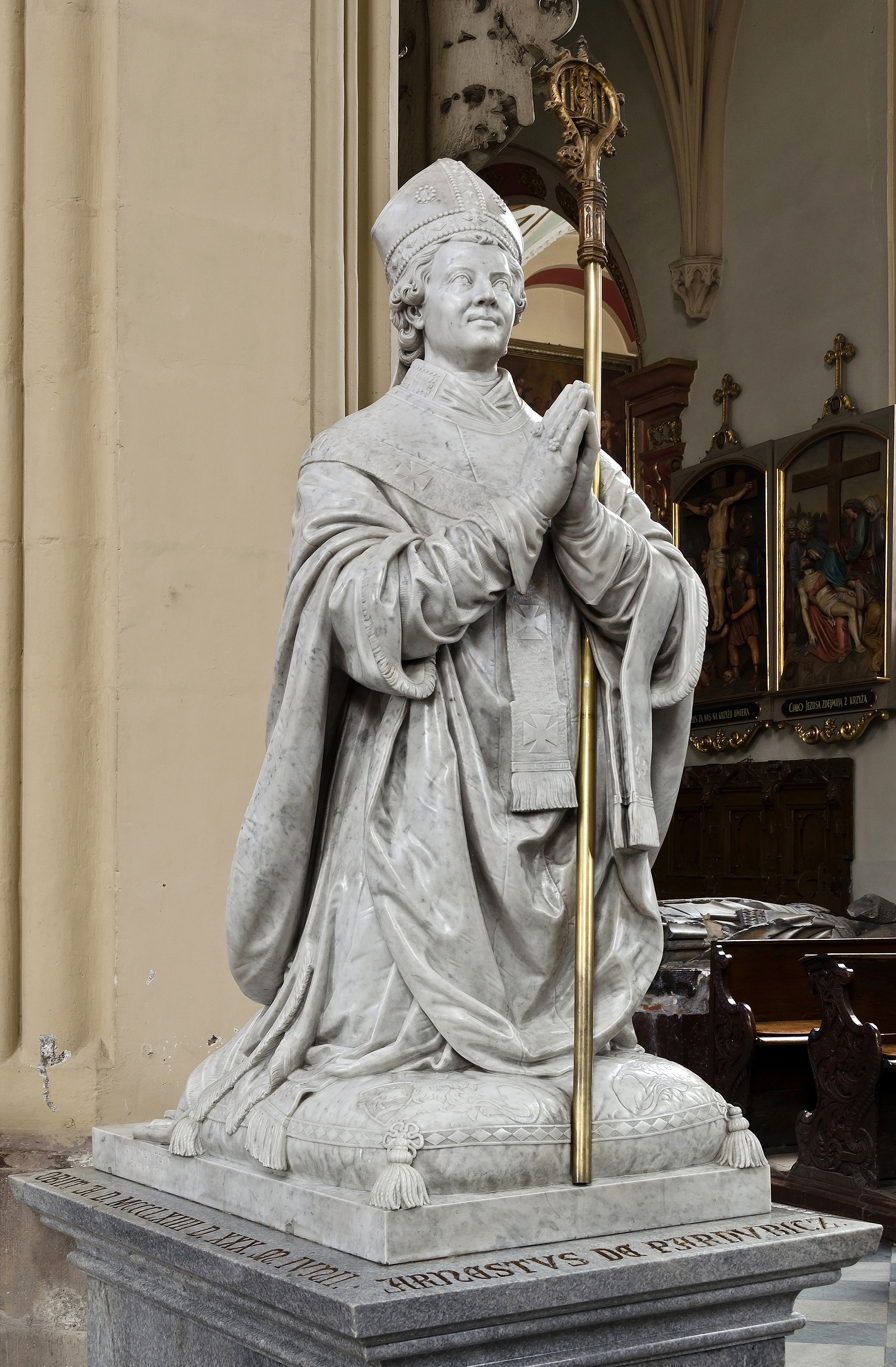
- Cenotaph of Arnošt of Pardubice in Assumption Church in Kłodzko
- Native name: Arnošt z Pardubic
- Church: Catholic Church
- Archdiocese: Archdiocese of Prague
- In office: 30 April 1344 – 30 June 1364
- Predecessor: himself (as Bishop of Prague)
- Successor: Jan Očko of Vlašim
- Previous post: Bishop of Prague (1343-1344)

Orders
- Consecration: 3 March 1343 by Jean-Raymond de Comminges

Personal details
- Born: 25 March 1297 Hostinka, Kingdom of Bohemia, Holy Roman Empire
- Died: 30 June 1364 (aged 67)

Arnošt of Pardubice (Czech: Arnošt z Pardubic, German: Ernst von Pardubitz; 25 March 1297 – 30 June 1364) was the first Archbishop of Prague (and the last bishop). He was also an advisor and diplomat to Emperor Charles IV.

== Life ==
Arnošt of Pardubice was probably born in Hostinka (today part of Vestec), but possibly also in Kłodzko. He was the eldest son of Knight Arnošt of Hostinka, and spent his childhood in Kłodzko.

Arnošt inherited the town of Pardubice in 1340. He was confirmed bishop of Prague on 11 March 1343 (3 March 1343 O.S.), and was commissioned the first Archbishop of Prague on 8 May 1344 (30 April 1344 O.S.). He ordered the monks to contribute to the newly founded Charles University (14th century), hence enhancing the quality of the education in the institution.
