= Gustav Adolf Procházka =

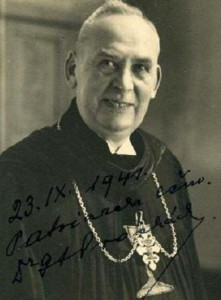
- Born: 11 March 1872; Kosmonosy, Bohemia, Austria-Hungary
- Died: 9 February 1942; Prague, Protectorate of Bohemia and Moravia

Gustav Adolf Procházka (11 March 1872 – 9 February 1942) was the second patriarch of the Czechoslovak Hussite Church.

Originally a Roman Catholic priest, he became a reformist oriented clergyman, and later co-founder with Karel Farský of the Czechoslovak Hussite Church, a spiritual leader of the church, bishop, and eventually patriarch.

Procházka (Doctor of Theology, doctor honoris) was also a theologian and professor at the Czechoslovak University Academy of Sciences. Starting 1935 until 1939 he was a professor on the Jan Hus line of theology at Charles University's Hus's Czechoslovak Evangelical Faculty of Theology (Czech: Husova československá evangelická fakulta bohoslovecká) in Prague.

He served as Bishop of the diocese of the Czechoslovak (Hussite) Church in East Bohemia (1923–1928). The church was founded in 1920 separated from the Roman Catholic Church. Karel Farský became the first patriarch of the church ruling from 1923 until his death in 1927.

In 1928, Gustav Adolf Procházka succeeded Patriarch Karel Farský as patriarch of the Czechoslovak Hussite Church staying in the position until his death in 1942. He concurrently held the position of Bishop of Prague and West Bohemia Diocese of the Church also from 1928 to 1942.

Preceded by Karel Farský	Patriarch of the Czechoslovak Hussite Church; 1928–1942	Succeeded by František Kovář
