= Czechoslovak Hussite Church =

Christian church

- Církev československá husitská
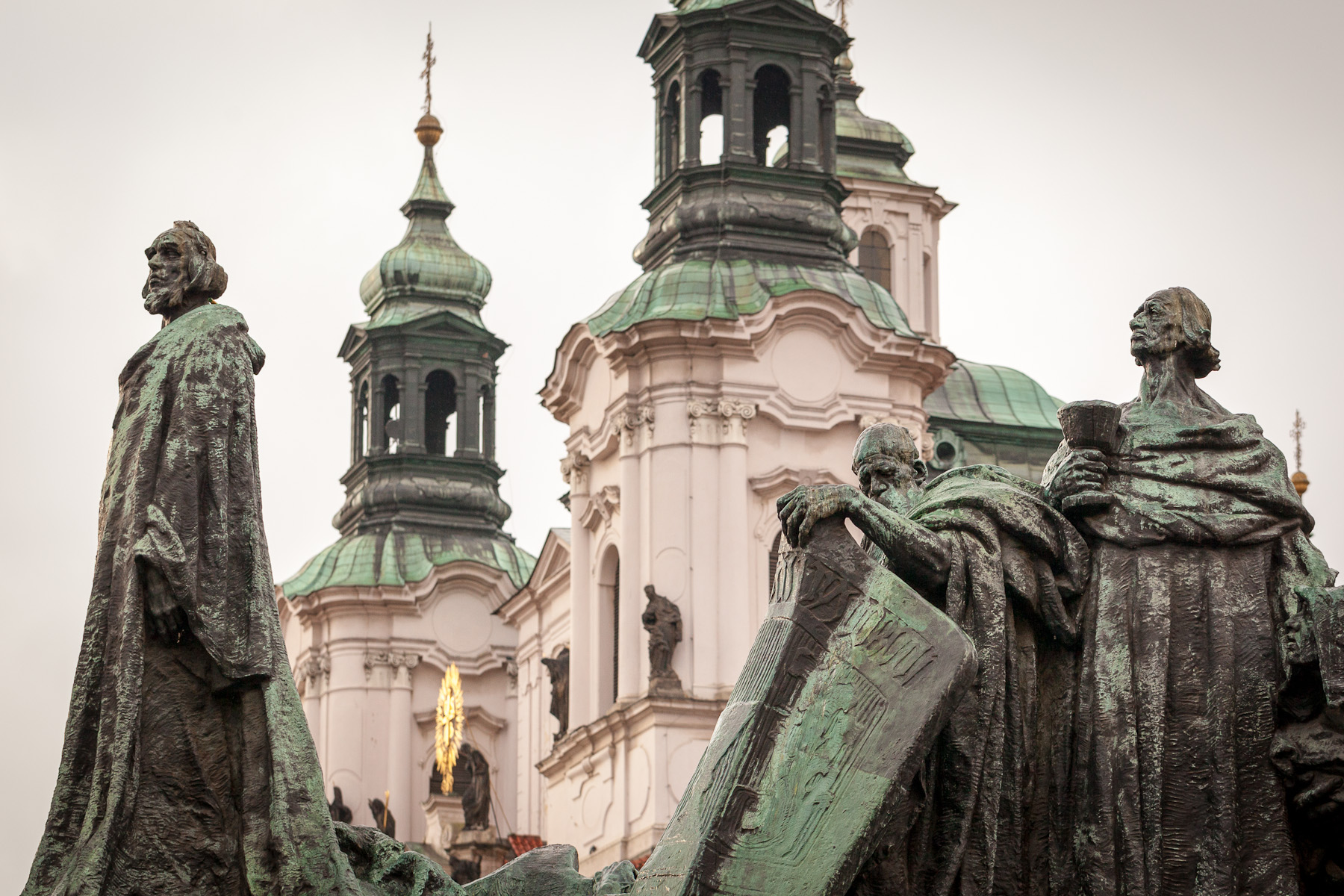
- Jan Hus Memorial and St. Nicholas Church, Prague
- Abbreviation: CČSH
- Classification: Christian
- Orientation: Hussite
- Theology: Neo-orthodox
- Polity: Mixture of Presbyterian and Episcopal
- Patriarch: Tomáš Butta
- Dioceses: 6
- Vicarages: 22
- Associations: Conference of European Churches, Communion of Protestant Churches in Europe
- Region: Czech Republic; Slovakia
- Language: Czech, Slovak
- Founder: Karel Farský
- Origin: January 8, 1920; 106 years ago Czechoslovakia
- Separated from: Roman Catholic Church
- Separations: Orthodox Church of the Czech lands and Slovakia (1924)
- Aid organization: Hussite Diaconia
- Publications: Český zápas
- Official website: www.ccsh.cz

The Czechoslovak Hussite Church (Czech: Církev československá husitská, CČSH or CČH; Slovak: Cirkev československá husitská) is a Christian church that separated from the Roman Catholic Church after World War I in Czechoslovakia.

Both the Czechoslovak Hussite Church and Moravian Church trace their tradition back to the Hussite reformers and acknowledge Jan Hus (John Huss) as their predecessor. It was well-supported by Czechoslovakia's first president, Tomáš Garrigue Masaryk, who himself belonged to the Evangelical Church of Czech Brethren.

The Czechoslovak Hussite Church describes itself as neo-Hussite. It is the third largest church in the Czech Republic, after the Catholic Church and the Evangelical Church of Czech Brethren.

== History ==
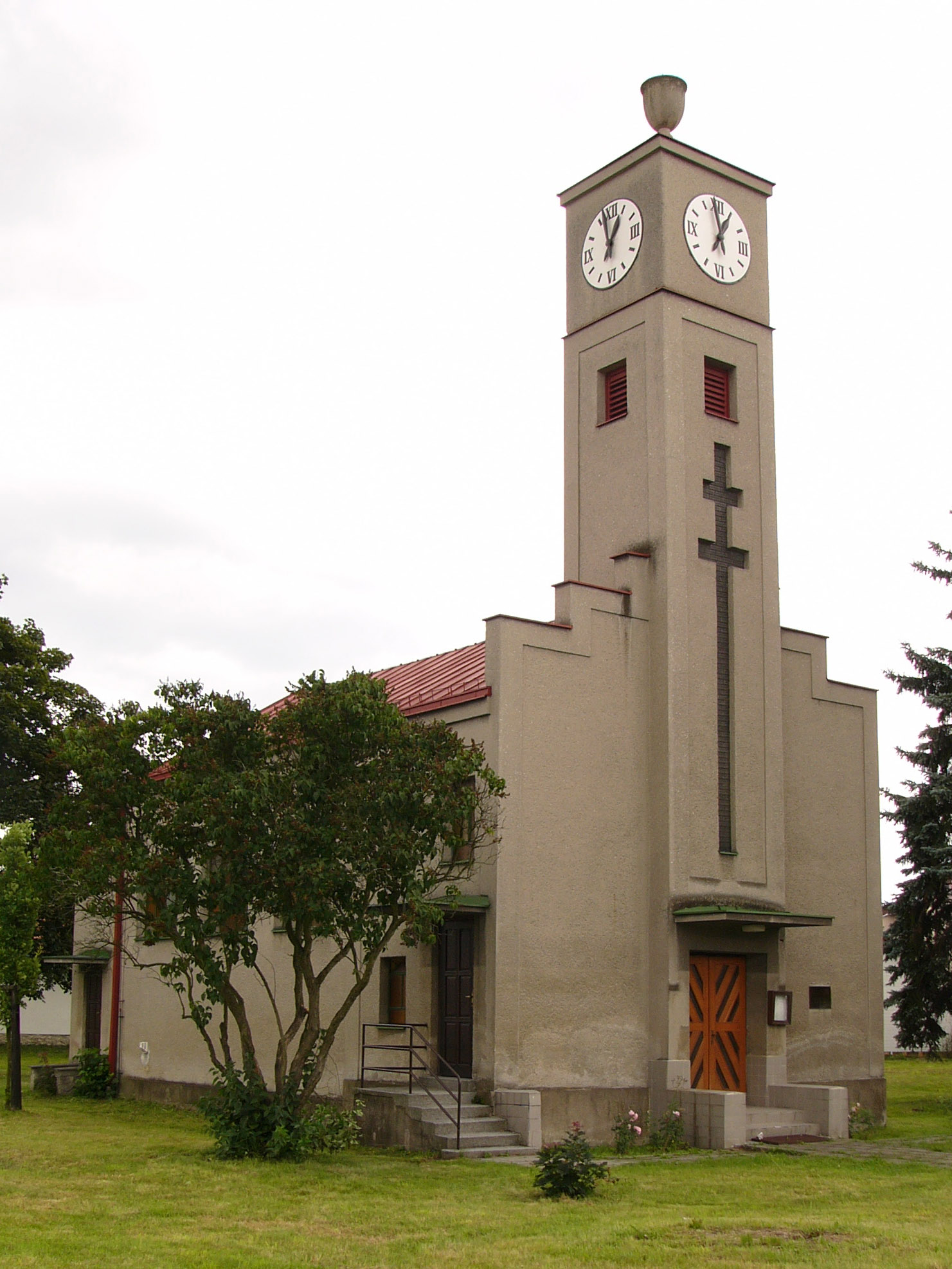
Church in Olomouc-Černovír (Czech Republic).

Both the Czechoslovak Hussite Church and Moravian Church trace their tradition back to the Hussite reformers and acknowledge Jan Hus (John Huss) as their predecessor.

The forerunner of the CČSH was the Jednota (Union of the Catholic Clergy), which was founded in 1890 to promote modernist reforms in the Roman Catholic Church, such as use of the vernacular in the liturgy and the adoption of voluntary rather than compulsory clerical celibacy. The radical movement that resulted in the foundation of a new Church began in the Christmas season of 1919, when Christmas masses were celebrated in Czech in many Czechoslovak churches. The CCH was established on January 8, 1920, by Dr. Karel Farský, who became its first Patriarch and author of its liturgy. It was known until 1971 as the Czechoslovak Church. The head of the church continues to bear the title of Patriarch.

In the 1930s, the church had a working-class membership and supported a socialist economic system in the years leading up to the 1948 Czechoslovak coup.

Membership figures of the church are not public. In a 2020 interview, Patriarch Tomáš Butta said the church had around 60,000 registered members. In 2021 censuses conducted in the Czech Republic and Slovakia 24,191 people self-identified as adherents of the church, 23,610 in the Czech Republic and 581 in Slovakia. There are 304 congregations divided into five dioceses situated in Prague, Plzeň, Hradec Králové, Brno, and Olomouc in the Czech Republic and three congregations in the Bratislava Diocese in Slovakia. There are approximately 266 priests in active ministry, of whom 130 are women. Candidates of ministry are prepared at the Hussite Faculty of Theology at Charles University in Prague.

== Doctrine and liturgy ==
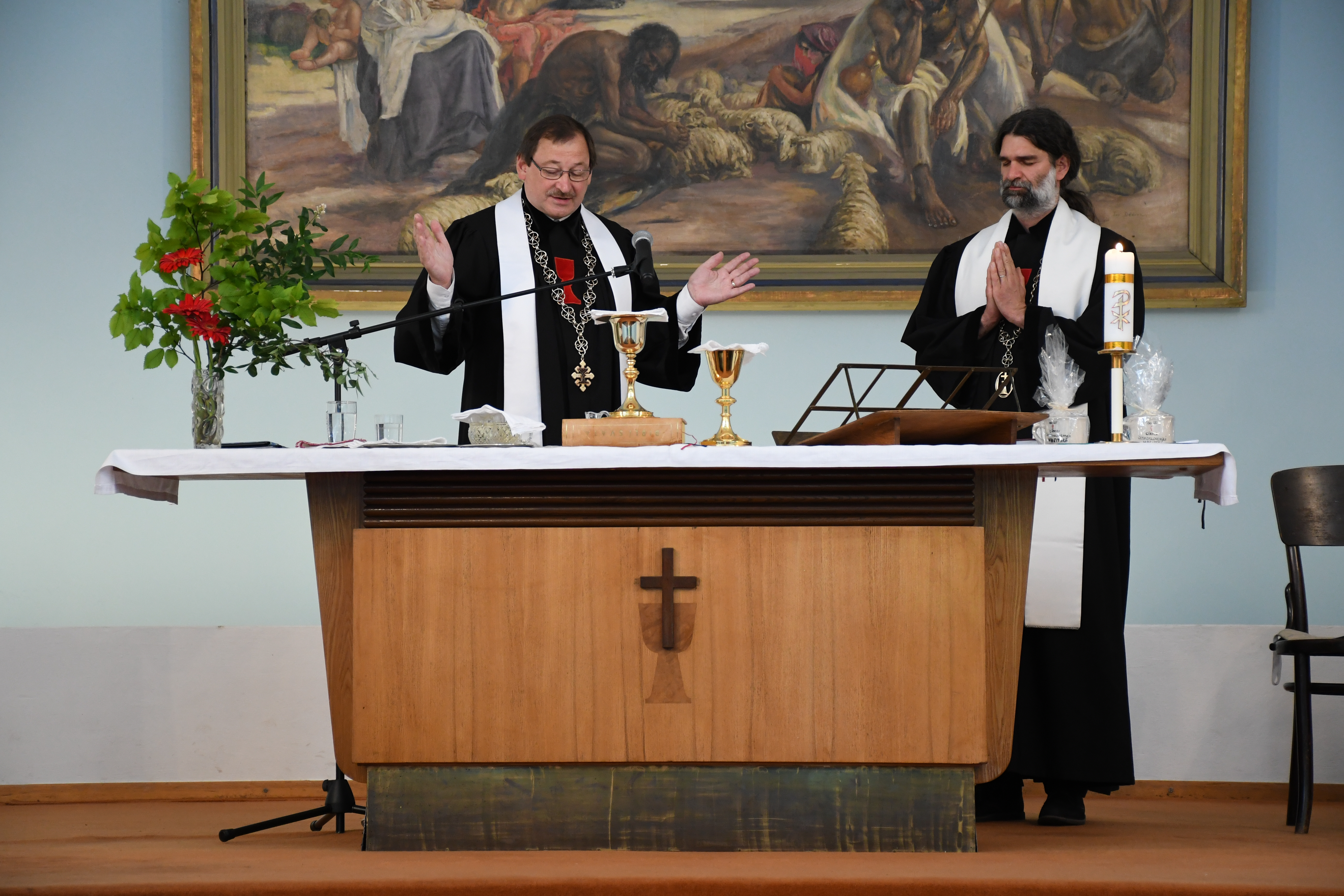
Patriarch Tomáš Butta and bishop of Brno Juraj Jordán Dovala in service.

It draws its teachings from the traditional Christianity presented by the Church Fathers (Patristics), with the first Seven Ecumenical Councils, the work of Saints Cyril and Methodius, and the Protestant Reformation tradition, especially Utraquist and Hussite thought.

Like Orthodox Christians, Roman Catholics, and Anglo-Catholics, the Czechoslovak Hussite Church recognizes seven sacraments. Like some of the Lutheran and Presbyterian churches, it emphasizes the freedom of conscience of individual believers, practices the ordination of women, and emphasizes the equal participation of the laity in church leadership. The Hussite Church, as with its sister church, the Moravian Church, teaches the doctrine of apostolic succession.

The celebration of the liturgy is the center of worship practice. It used to be two forms, which have much in common with the texts of the Catholic Mass, but there are also elements of Luther's German Mass and the tradition of the Utraquist mass. Clergy wear a black robe with an embroidered red chalice and a white stole during the service.

There is no veneration of saints as practiced in the Apostolic Churches, but images of saints are employed in the church decoration. In the post-1920 period new churches were built, but only a few portraits were considered appropriate to place in them, particularly representations of Christ, and occasionally pictures of Jan Hus.

In the iconography of the church the chalice plays a major role, usually depicted in red, as it was used in the 15th century as a battle standard on the flags of the Hussites. It is found in the church, to the sacerdotal, the bindings of liturgical books, church steeples and church banners.

== Demography ==
After a split from the Roman Catholic Church, amidst the post-war atmosphere of anti-Catholic agitation and euphoria about the Czech independence, the Czechoslovak Church's membership increased rapidly. In the 1921 Czechoslovak census, the first post-war census, 523,232 people claimed to be adherents of this church in what is today the Czech Republic. In 1930, the membership further grew to 779,672. With 7.3% of total population, it became the prevailing religion in several regions of Bohemia and to a lesser degree in Moravia. At the beginning of Communist rule, the 1950 census recorded 946,497 adherents of the Czechoslovak Hussite Church. In the following decades there was no official census of religious affiliation in what is today the Czech Republic, although it is apparent that under Communist rule, membership started to collapse.

== Relations with other churches ==
At its beginning, the Hussite Church sought relations with the Serbian Orthodox Church and the Old Catholic Church, and also espoused a tendency to a rationalist and Unitarian Christian theology, but when adopted its creed in 1958 it was founded on the Nicene-Constantinopolitan Creed.

The church is a member of the Ecumenical Council of Churches in the Czech Republic, the Conference of European Churches, and the Leuenberg Community of Churches.

Relations between the church and other members of the ecumenical movement are cordial, but remained strained with the country's Roman Catholic leadership. The first woman to become a bishop of the Czechoslovak Hussite church, Jana Šilerová, was elected to a seven-year term of office in April 1999. In January 1999, Roman Catholic Archbishop Miloslav Vlk made a public statement of disapproval, warning against election of a woman to this position and saying that it would cause deterioration of ecumenical relations. Following criticism by the Czechoslovak Hussite Church for interfering in its affairs, the Roman Catholic Church distanced itself from the archbishop's remarks and stated that it would exert no pressure against her election. In 2000, Roman Catholic representatives attended the consecration of Jana Šilerová as the Hussite Church's first woman to become a bishop.

== Patriarchs ==
- Karel Farský (1924–1927)
- Gustav Adolf Procházka (1927–1942)
- František Kovář (1946–1961)
- Miroslav Novák (1961–1990)
- Vratislav Štěpánek (1991–1994)
- Josef Špak (1994–2001)
- Jan Schwarz (2001–2006)
- Tomáš Butta (2006–present)

== Dioceses ==
- Prague Diocese (bishop David Tonzar)
- Olomouc Diocese (bishop Tomáš Chytil)
- Plzeň Diocese (bishop Lukáš Bujna)
- Hradec Králové Diocese (bishop Pavel Pechanec)
- Brno Diocese (bishop Juraj Jordán Dovala)
- Bratislava Diocese (bishop Jan Hradil)

== See also ==
- Unity of the Brethren (Czech Republic)
- Hussite Theological Faculty, Charles University in Prague

== Bibliography ==
- Abrams, Bradley F. (2004). "Socialism and Protestant Intellectuals: The "Kingdom of God on Earth"?". The Struggle for the Soul of the Nation: Czech Culture and the Rise of Communism. Rowman & Littlefield. ISBN 978-0-7425-3023-2.
- Nĕmec, Ludvík (1975) The Czechoslovak Heresy and Schism: the emergence of a national Czechoslovak church American Philosophical Society, Philadelphia, ISBN 0-87169-651-7
- Tonzar, David (2002) Vznik a vývoj novodobé husitské teologie a Církev československá husitska Karolinum, Prague, ISBN 80-246-0499-X in Czech
- Urban, Rudolf (1973) Die tschechoslowakische hussitische Kirche J.G. Herder-Institut, Marburg/Lahn, ISBN 3-87969-103-7, in German
