= Agnes of Bohemia, Duchess of Jawor =

Polish princess

Agnes of Bohemia
- Duchess of Jawor
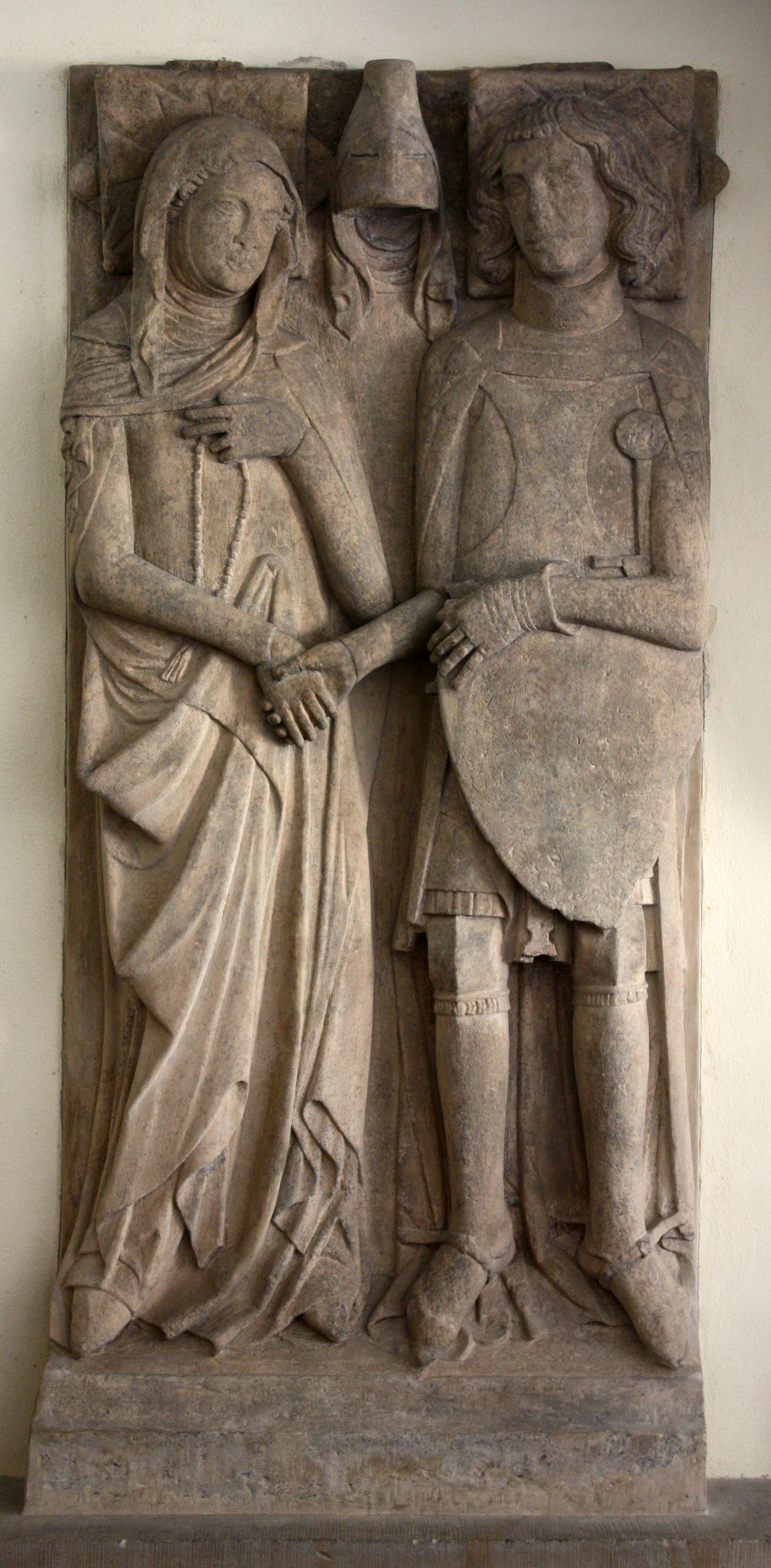
- Silver tombstone conserved in Lwówek Śląski, possibly representing Henry I of Jawor and Agnes of Bohemia
- Born: 15 June 1305
- Died: Before 4 January 1337 (aged c. 31)
- Spouse: Henry I of Jawor (m. 1316)
Names
- Czech: Anežka Přemyslovna; Polish: Agnieszka Przemyślidka
- Dynasty: Přemyslid
- Father: Wenceslaus II of Bohemia
- Mother: Elisabeth Richeza of Poland

Agnes of Bohemia (Czech: Anežka Přemyslovna, Polish: Agnieszka Przemyślidka; 15 June 1305 – before 4 January 1337) was the only child of King Wenceslaus II of Bohemia by his second wife, Elisabeth Richeza of Poland. She was a member of the Přemyslid dynasty.

== Family ==
Her father's previous marriage to Judith of Habsburg had produced four surviving children, Wenceslaus III of Bohemia, Anna of Bohemia, Elisabeth of Bohemia and Margaret of Bohemia. Her father, Wenceslaus II, died just six days after her birth, on 21 June 1305, in Prague. His heir Wenceslaus III was assassinated one year later, in Olomouc, and with him the Přemyslid dynasty became extinct.

Agnes' mother, Elisabeth Richeza, subsequently married Rudolf I of Bohemia, son of Albert I of Germany, on 16 October 1306. Rudolph was chosen to be King of Bohemia by part of Czech nobility and Elisabeth remained queen consort for a short time. Rudolph died of dysentery on 4 July 1307, after becoming ill during the siege of the fortress of one of the revolting noblemen, Bavor III of Strakonice. In his last will, Rudolph acknowledged Elizabeth Richeza's dowry towns and bequeathed her a huge amount of money in silver talents.

== Marriage ==
Elisabeth arranged for Agnes to marry Henry I of Jawor. The wedding took place in 1316; however, because the two were related in the fourth degree of kinship, a papal dispensation was required. It was granted in 1325. Agnes' brother-in-law, King John of Bohemia, opposed the marriage, which would make Henry a powerful rival, along with Bolesław III the Generous, the husband of Margaret of Bohemia, a half-sister of Agnes.

Shortly after the wedding and, with the consent of Elisabeth, Henry I went with his troops to her dowry town, Hradec Králové in North Bohemia, where he organised expeditions to support rebels against King John of Bohemia.

Agnes had only one pregnancy, which ended in a miscarriage, in the first trimester when she rode with her horse over a hill. This accident kept her in bed for many months.

Agnes outlived her mother, who died in October 1335, but died shortly after, before 4 January 1337.

== Ancestry ==
Ancestors of Agnes of Bohemia, Duchess of Jawor

16. Ottokar I of Bohemia
8. Wenceslaus I of Bohemia
17. Constance of Hungary
4. Ottokar II of Bohemia
18. Philip of Swabia
9. Kunigunde of Hohenstaufen
19. Irene Angelina
2. Wenceslaus II of Bohemia
20. Michael of Chernigov
10. Rostislav Mikhailovich
21. Maria Romanovna of Halych
5. Kunigunda of Slavonia
22. Béla IV of Hungary
11. Anna of Hungary, Duchess of Macsó
23. Maria Laskarina
1. Agnes of Bohemia
24. Władysław Odonic
12. Przemysł I of Greater Poland
25. Hedwig
6. Przemysł II
26. Henry II the Pious
13. Elisabeth of Wrocław
27. Anne of Bohemia
3. Elisabeth Richeza of Poland
28. Birger Jarl
14. Valdemar, King of Sweden
29. Ingeborg Eriksdotter of Sweden
7. Richeza of Sweden, Duchess of Poland
30. Eric IV of Denmark
15. Sofia of Denmark
31. Jutta of Saxony

== Bibliography ==
- Agnès Przemyslide
