= Richeza =

Richeza or Richenza is a woman's first name. It is a Polish name of Old Icelandic origin (Rikissa). In Old Icelandic Rixa means wealthy. It can be compared to other names ending in -ric.

- Rikissa of Denmark (died 1220)
- Richeza of Sweden, Duchess of Poland, mother of Elisabeth Richeza of Poland
- Richeza of Poland, Queen of Castile (1140-1185)
- Richeza of Poland, Queen of Hungary (1013-1075)
- Richeza of Poland, Queen of Sweden (1116–after 1156)
- Elizabeth Richeza of Poland, Polish princess and Czech queen.
- Richeza of Berg (1095-1125), wife of Vladislav I of Bohemia and the Duchess of Bohemia. She was the daughter of count Henry I of Berg and his wife Adelheid of Mochental.
- Richeza of Lotharingia (died 1063), daughter of Count Palatine Ezzo of Lotharingia and niece of Emperor Otto III. and wife of Polish King Mieszko II Lambert.
- Richenza of Northeim, a member of the dynasty of the Counts of Northeim, and a German Empress.
- Rikissa Magnusdotter (1285-1348)
- Richeza of Sweden, Duchess of Poland (1270-1292)
