= Coronation of the Bohemian monarch =

Legitimation ceremony in the Kingdom of Bohemia

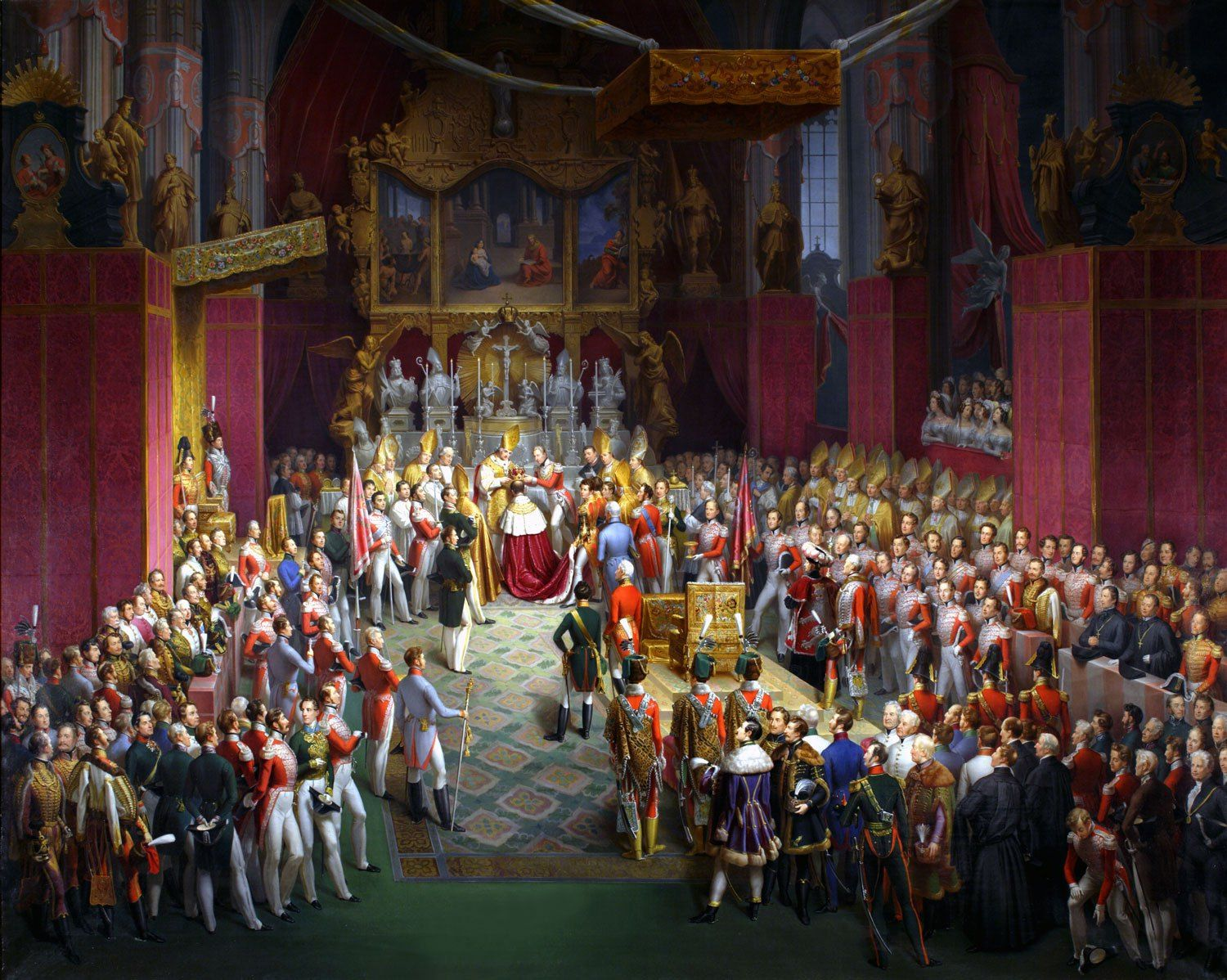
Coronation of King Ferdinand V of Bohemia in 1836, the last Bohemian coronation.

The Coronation of the Bohemian monarch was a ceremony in which the king (or queen-regnant) and queen-consort (if there was one) were formally crowned, anointed, and invested with regalia. It was similar in form to coronation ceremonies in other parts of the Holy Roman Empire, in France, and in Hungary. As in France and England, the king's reign began immediately upon the death of his predecessor, especially after 1627.

Location of all coronations was St. Vitus Cathedral in Prague, from the time it was founded (except for the secular coronations of the earliest kings). The representative of the Church performing the coronation (consecrator) was the Archbishop of Prague as Primas Bohemiae. Until the archbishopric of Prague was established in 1344, the archbishop of Mainz had the privilege of crowning the king and queen of Bohemia (from 1228 to 1344). This right was derived from his position as Primas Germaniae of the Holy Roman Empire and ecclesiastical overlord of the Bohemian dioceses of Prague and Olomouc. During the Sede vacante of the archdiocese of Prague from 1421 to 1561, the position of consecrator was mostly filled by bishop of Olomouc (highest local Roman Catholic bishop after archbishop of Prague) or by foreign bishops. During coronation, the archbishop was assisted by two bishops (mostly from the lands of the Bohemian Crown).

The form of the coronation ceremony was prescribed in an order of coronation (ordo in Latin, korunovační řád in Czech) ordained by King Charles I (Charles IV, Holy Roman Emperor). It was based on an earlier Bohemian order of coronation (itself based on German coronation custom), and on the French coronation ceremony.

The first ruler (king) of Bohemia to be crowned was Vratislaus II of Bohemia. During the Middle Ages, it was held that enthronement would make a person Duke of Bohemia and that only coronation would make a person King of Bohemia. So coronations were held shortly after the accession of a new king. In the modern era, the new king ascended to the throne immediately after the death of his predecessor, and the coronation ceremony was held some time after his accession. The coronation church was St. Vitus Cathedral. Beginning in 1347, the monarchs of Bohemia were crowned with the Crown of Saint Wenceslas and invested with royal insignia, including a cap or mitre and a lance symbolic of Saint Wenceslas. Earlier coronation crowns have not been preserved.

Maria Theresa, the only female monarch of Bohemia, was crowned literally as king in order to emphasize that she was the monarch and not a consort. The last King of Bohemia to undergo a coronation were Emperor Ferdinand I of Austria (Ferdinand V as king of Bohemia) and his wife queen Maria Anna.

Most queen-consorts were crowned together with their husband, during the same ceremony, or one or more days after the coronation of the King. The first queen crowned alone was Elizabeth Richeza of Poland, the wife of Wenceslaus II, who was crowned on 26 May 1303 by the bishop of Wrocław. The last queen crowned in a separate coronation was Anna of Tyrol, wife of Matthias, on 10 January 1616.

The Abbess of St. George's Abbey had traditionally the privilege to assist archbishop with crowning of the wife of the King of Bohemia. St. George's Convent was abolished in 1782 and in 1791, the right to assist with crowning of the Queen of Bohemia was transferred to the Abbess of the neighbouring Theresian Institution of Noble Ladies (a post always filled by an Archduchess of Austria).

Coronation was not a prerequisite for exercising sovereign power in Bohemia, but all kings except seven were crowned. These were:

- Wenceslaus III (ruled 1305–1306, short reign, murdered before coronation)
- Rudolf I of Bohemia (ruled 1306–1307, short reign, deposed)
- Henry of Bohemia (ruled 1307–1310, short reign, deposed)
- Joseph I (ruled 1705–1711, died before coronation)
- Joseph II (ruled 1780–1790, not crowned in Hungary either)
- Franz Joseph I (ruled 1848–1916, longest reigning king, coronation promised twice but never realized)
- Charles III (ruled 1916–1918, short reign; state at war, deposed).

Coronation of the heir during life of his father sometimes occurred in the medieval and baroque period. King Ferdinand IV was crowned during the lifetime of his father (Ferdinand III), but died before him, so he never actually reigned. Other kings crowned during the reign of their predecessor were: Wenceslaus I of Bohemia, Wenceslaus IV of Bohemia, Louis, Maximilian, Rudolf II, Matthias, Ferdinand II, Ferdinand III, and Leopold I. Anti-king Charles Albert was not crowned during his short reign because the crown jewels were held by Maria Theresa. Charles Albert was proclaimed king in December 1741 by the Bohemian nobility in the presence of the archbishop of Prague.

== List of royal coronations ==
Status	Name	Date	Place	Consecrator
King	Vratislaus II of Bohemia	20 April 1085; 15 June 1086	Mainz; Prague	Henry IV, Holy Roman Emperor; Egilbert von Ortenburg; Archbishop of Trier
Queen	Świętosława of Poland	15 June 1086	Prague	Egilbert von Ortenburg; Archbishop of Trier
King	Vladislaus I	11 January 1158; 8 September 1158	Regensburg; Milan	Frederick I, Holy Roman Emperor
King	Ottokar I of Bohemia	8 September 1198; 24 August 1203	Boppard; Merseburg	Guidem of Praeneste; Papal legate
King	Wenceslaus I of Bohemia	6 February 1228	St. Vitus basilica, Prague	Siegfried von Eppstein; Archbishop of Mainz
Queen	Kunigunde of Hohenstaufen wife of Wenceslaus I	6 February 1228	St. Vitus basilica, Prague	Siegfried von Eppstein; Archbishop of Mainz
King	Ottokar II of Bohemia	25 December 1261	St. Vitus basilica, Prague	Werner von Eppstein; Archbishop of Mainz
Queen	Kunigunda of Halych wife of Ottokar II of Bohemia	25 December 1261	St. Vitus basilica, Prague	Werner von Eppstein; Archbishop of Mainz
King	Wenceslaus II of Bohemia	2 June 1297	St. Vitus basilica, Prague	Gerhard von Eppstein; Archbishop of Mainz
Queen	Judith of Habsburg wife of Wenceslaus II	2 June 1297	St. Vitus basilica, Prague	Gerhard von Eppstein; Archbishop of Mainz
Queen	Elizabeth Richeza of Poland wife of Wenceslaus II	26 May 1303	St. Vitus basilica, Prague	Henry of Wierzbna bishop of Wrocław
King	John of Bohemia	7 February 1311	St. Vitus basilica, Prague	Peter of Aspelt; Archbishop of Mainz
Queen	Elizabeth of Bohemia wife of John of Bohemia, heiress of Kingdom	7 February 1311	St. Vitus basilica, Prague	Peter of Aspelt; Archbishop of Mainz
Queen	Beatrice of Bourbon wife of John of Bohemia	18 May 1337	St. Vitus Cathedral, Prague	John IV of Dražice bishop of Prague
King	Charles I (Charles IV, Holy Roman Emperor)	2 September 1347	St. Vitus Cathedral, Prague	Arnošt of Pardubice; Archbishop of Prague
Queen	Blanche of Valois wife of Charles	2 September 1347	St. Vitus Cathedral, Prague	Arnošt of Pardubice; Archbishop of Prague
Queen	Anne of Bavaria wife of Charles	1 September 1349	St. Vitus Cathedral, Prague	Arnošt of Pardubice; Archbishop of Prague
Queen	Anna von Schweidnitz wife of Charles	28 July 1353	St. Vitus Cathedral, Prague	Arnošt of Pardubice; Archbishop of Prague
Queen	Elizabeth of Pomerania wife of Charles	18 June 1363	St. Vitus Cathedral, Prague	Arnošt of Pardubice; Archbishop of Prague
King	Wenceslaus IV of Bohemia	15 June 1363	St. Vitus Cathedral, Prague	Arnošt of Pardubice; Archbishop of Prague
Queen	Joanna of Bavaria wife of Wenceslaus IV	17 November 1370	St. Vitus Cathedral, Prague	Jan Očko of Vlašim; Archbishop of Prague
Queen	Sophia of Bavaria wife of Wenceslaus IV	13 March 1400	St. Vitus Cathedral, Prague	Olbram III of Škvorec; Archbishop of Prague
King	Sigismund	28 July 1420	St. Vitus Cathedral, Prague	Conrad of Vechta; Archbishop of Prague
Queen	Barbara of Cilli wife of Sigismund	11 February 1437	St. Vitus Cathedral, Prague	Sede vacante Philibert de Montjeu, bishop of Coutances
King	Albert	29 June 1438	St. Vitus Cathedral, Prague	Sede vacante Paul von Miličin und Talmberg, bishop of Olomouc
King	Ladislaus the Posthumous	28 October 1453	St. Vitus Cathedral, Prague	Sede vacante Jan XIII, bishop of Olomouc
King	George of Poděbrady	7 May 1458	St. Vitus Cathedral, Prague	Sede vacante Ágoston Salánki, bishop of Győr; Vince Szilassi, bishop of Vác
Queen	Joanna of Rožmitál wife of George of Poděbrady	8 May 1458	St. Vitus Cathedral, Prague	Sede vacante Ágoston Salánki, bishop of Győr; Vince Szilassi, bishop of Vác
King	Vladislaus II	22 August 1471	St. Vitus Cathedral, Prague	Sede vacante Jan XIII, bishop of Kamianets-Podilskyi
King	Louis	11 March 1509	St. Vitus Cathedral, Prague	Sede vacante Stanislav I Thurzo, bishop of Olomouc
Queen	Mary of Hungary wife of Louis	1 January 1522	St. Vitus Cathedral, Prague	Sede vacante Stanislav I Thurzo, bishop of Olomouc
King	Ferdinand I	24 February 1527	St. Vitus Cathedral, Prague	Sede vacante Stanislav I Thurzo, bishop of Olomouc
Queen	Anne of Bohemia and Hungary wife of Ferdinand I	24 February 1527	St. Vitus Cathedral, Prague	Sede vacante Stanislav I Thurzo, bishop of Olomouc
King	Maximilian	20 November 1562	St. Vitus Cathedral, Prague	Antonín Brus of Mohelnice; Archbishop of Prague
Queen	Maria of Austria wife of Maximilian	20 November 1562	St. Vitus Cathedral, Prague	Antonín Brus of Mohelnice; Archbishop of Prague
King	Rudolf II	25 September 1575	St. Vitus Cathedral, Prague	Antonín Brus of Mohelnice; Archbishop of Prague
King	Matthias	11 May 1611	St. Vitus Cathedral, Prague	Franz von Dietrichstein; Bishop of Olomouc
Queen	Anna of Tyrol wife of Matthias	10 January 1616	St. Vitus Cathedral, Prague	Johann Lohel; Archbishop of Prague
Anti-King; Winter King	Frederick	4 November 1619	St. Vitus Cathedral, Prague	Jiří Dikast Mirkovský; Jan Cyril Třebíčský; Wilhelm Popel von Lobkowitz; Bohuchval Berka z Dubé
Queen	Elizabeth Stuart wife of Frederick	4 November 1619	St. Vitus Cathedral, Prague	Jiří Dikast Mirkovský
King	Ferdinand II	29 June 1617	St. Vitus Cathedral, Prague	Johann Lohel; Archbishop of Prague
Queen	Eleonora Gonzaga wife of Ferdinand II	21 November 1627	St. Vitus Cathedral, Prague	Ernst Adalbert von Harrach; Archbishop of Prague, primate of Bohemia
King	Ferdinand III	24 November 1627	St. Vitus Cathedral, Prague	Ernst Adalbert von Harrach; Archbishop of Prague, primate of Bohemia
King	Ferdinand IV crowned during lifetime of his father, never reign	5 August 1646	St. Vitus Cathedral, Prague	Ernst Adalbert von Harrach; Archbishop of Prague, primate of Bohemia
Queen	Eleonora Gonzaga wife of Ferdinand III	11 September 1656	St. Vitus Cathedral, Prague	Ernst Adalbert von Harrach; Archbishop of Prague, primate of Bohemia
King	Leopold I	14 November 1656	St. Vitus Cathedral, Prague	Ernst Adalbert von Harrach; Archbishop of Prague, primate of Bohemia
King	Charles II	5 September 1723	St. Vitus Cathedral, Prague	Ferdinand Graf von Khünburg; Archbishop of Prague, primate of Bohemia
Queen	Elisabeth Christine of Brunswick-Wolfenbüttel wife of Charles II	8 September 1723	St. Vitus Cathedral, Prague	Ferdinand Graf von Khünburg; Archbishop of Prague, primate of Bohemia
Queen-regnant	Maria Theresa	12 May 1743	St. Vitus Cathedral, Prague	Jakub Arnošt z Lichtenštejna-Kastelkornu; Bishop of Olomouc
King	Leopold II	6 September 1791	St. Vitus Cathedral, Prague	Antonín Petr hrabě Příchovský z Příchovic; Archbishop of Prague, primate of Bohemia
Queen	Maria Luisa of Spain wife of Leopold II	12 September 1791	St. Vitus Cathedral, Prague	Antonín Theodor Colloredo-Waldsee; Archbishop of Olomouc; Maria Anna of Austria, archduchess-abbes of Damenstift
King	Francis	9 August 1793	St. Vitus Cathedral, Prague	Antonín Petr hrabě Příchovský z Příchovic; Archbishop of Prague, primate of Bohemia
Queen	Maria Theresa of Naples and Sicily wife of Francis	11 August 1793	St. Vitus Cathedral, Prague	Antonín Petr hrabě Příchovský z Příchovic; Archbishop of Prague, primate of Bohemia; Maria Anna of Austria, archduchess-abbes of Damenstift
King	Ferdinand V	7 September 1836	St. Vitus Cathedral, Prague	Andrzej Alojzy Ankwicz; Archbishop of Prague, primate of Bohemia
Queen	Maria Anna of Savoy wife of Ferdinand V	12 September 1836	St. Vitus Cathedral, Prague	Andrzej Alojzy Ankwicz; Archbishop of Prague, primate of Bohemia; Maria Theresa of Austria, archduchess-abbes of Damenstift

== See also ==
- Bohemian crown jewels

== Bibliography ==
- Cibulka, Josef (1935). Korunovační řády středověké a Karla IV. korunovační řád králů českých. Prague: ČKD.
- Hrbek, Jiří (2010). České barokní korunovace (en: Bohemian baroque coronations). Prague: NLN - Nakladatelství Lidové noviny. ISBN 978-80-7422-011-1.
- Kuthan, Jiří; Šmied, Miroslav (2009). Korunovační řád českých králů (en: Coronation prescription of bohemian kings). Prague: Togga. ISBN 978-80-7308-266-6.
- Pacovský, Karel (2024). "The Involvement of the Abbesses of St. George's Convent in the Medieval Coronations of Queens of Bohemia". In Hamburger, Jeffrey F.; Schlotheuber, Eva (eds.). The Ladies on the Hill: The Female Monastic Communities at the Aristocratic Monasteries of Klosterneuburg and St. George's in Prague. Wien: Böhlau Verlag. pp. 91–100. doi:10.7767/9783205221760.91. ISBN 978-3-205-22176-0.
- Sekyrová, Milada (2004). 7.9.1836 Ferdinand V. - Poslední pražská korunovace (en: 7.9.1836 Ferdinand V. - Last coronation in Prague). Prague: Havran s.r.o. ISBN 80-86515-37-0.
- Žůrek, Václav (2022). "The Coronations of Bohemian Kings and Queens". In Šmahel, František; Nodl, Martin; Žůrek, Václav (eds.). Festivities, Ceremonies, and Rituals in the Lands of the Bohemian Crown in the Late Middle Ages (East Central and Eastern Europe in the Middle Ages, 450–1450, vol. 82 ed.). Leiden: Brill. pp. 9–52. doi:10.1163/9789004514010_003. ISBN 978-90-04-51401-0.
