= Cunigunde of Hungary =

Cunigunde of Hungary can refer to:

- Cunigunde of Luxembourg (975–1040), Empress of the Holy Roman Empire
- Kunigunda of Halych (1245–1285), Queen consort and Regent of Bohemia
