= Ryksa =

In early Polish history, the given name Ryksa may refer to:

- Ryksa (Hilderyka, Brunhilda), sometimes mistakenly named as the German wife of the legendary 9th-century Polish ruler Popiel; however, the actual real name of Popiel's wife has not been specified by early historians.
- Blessed Richeza of Lotharingia or Ryksa (around 1063), Queen of Poland, wife of King Mieszko II (1025–1031).
- Ryksa (1018 - after 1059), possible name of wife of Béla "filia Miskæ (Polonorum duce)" as recorded in "The Gesta Hungarorum, (Europäische Stammtafeln).
- Richeza of Sweden, Queen of Poland, known as Ryksa, spouse of King Przemysł II, born before 1273, deceased before 1293.
- Elizabeth Richeza of Poland (Czech: Eliška-Rejčka; Polish: Ryksa-Elżbieta; 1288–1335), queen consort of Bohemia and of Poland, and Duchess consort of Austria and Styria

== See also ==
- Rzepicha, wife of the semi-legendary Piast Kołodziej (the Wheelwright)
