= Richeza of Sweden =

Richeza of Sweden, also Rixa - Swedish: Rikissa - may refer to:

- Richeza of Poland, Queen consort of Sweden about 1127
- Rikissa of Denmark, Queen consort of Sweden 1210
- Rikissa Birgersdotter, Swedish princess de facto 1238
- Richeza of Sweden, Queen of Poland, Princess of Sweden about 1273
- Richeza, Princess of Sweden, died 1348, daughter of King Magnus III, abbess
- Richeza, Princess of Sweden about 1448, daughter of King Carl II, nun
