= Rikissa Valdemarsdotter =

Rikissa Valdemarsdotter or Richiza Valdemarsdottir may refer to:

- Richeza of Sweden, Duchess of Poland (between 1265 and 1270 – before 1292), wife of Duke Przemysł II of Greater Poland
- Rikissa of Denmark (died 1220), Queen of Sweden as the wife of Erik Knutsson
