= Beatrice of Bourbon, Queen of Bohemia =

Queen of Bohemia from 1334 to 1346

Beatrice of Bourbon
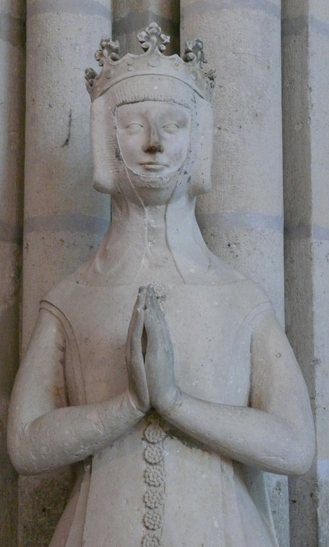

Queen consort of Bohemia
- Tenure: 1334–1346
- Coronation: 18 May 1337
- Born: 1320
- Died: 23 December 1383 (aged 62–63)
- Burial: Église des Jacobins, Paris
- Spouse: John of Bohemia; Eudes II, Lord of Grancey
- Issue: Wenceslaus I, Duke of Luxembourg
- House: Bourbon
- Father: Louis I, Duke of Bourbon
- Mother: Mary of Avesnes

Beatrice of Bourbon (1320 – 23 December 1383) was by marriage Queen of Bohemia and Countess of Luxembourg. Initially betrothed to Philip, Despot of Romania, she later married King John of Bohemia. By 1337 she had given birth to a son, Wenceslaus, and then promptly left Prague, residing in Luxembourg. After being widowed in 1346, Beatrice married Eudes II, Lord of Grancey in 1347. She died 27 December 1383 and was buried at the Couvent des Jacobins.

== Life ==
Born in 1320, Beatrice was the daughter of Louis I, Duke of Bourbon and Mary of Avesnes. Beatrice was betrothed to Philip, Despot of Romania, the second son of Philip I, Prince of Taranto, in May 1321. The engagement was broken in 1327 after Philip chose to marry Violante of Aragon, daughter of James II of Aragon. At the age of fourteen, she was married to John of Bohemia. The marriage was arranged by Philip VI of France, who wanted closer ties with Bohemia.

The marriage of Beatrice and John was celebrated in the Château de Vincennes in December 1334, at which time she was fourteen years old. But because the two were related in a prohibited degree, Pope Benedict XII had to give dispensation for the marriage, which was granted in Avignon on 9 January 1335.

The marriage contract stipulated that if a son was born from the marriage, the County of Luxembourg (John's paternal heritage), as well as lands belonging to it, would go to him.

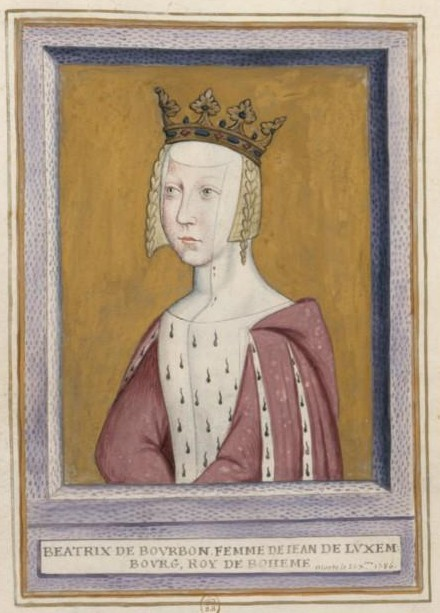

=== Queen of Bohemia ===
Beatrice arrived in Prague in July 1335. She brought with her an annual income of 4,000 livres from her father's County of Clermont. On 25 February 1337, Beatrice gave birth in Prague to her only child, (Note: There is some indirect evidence that this was the first caesarean section that was survived by both the mother and child.) a son named Wenceslaus after the holy patron of the Přemyslid dynasty; probably calling her son with this name either the queen or her husband tried to gain the favor of the Bohemians. The relationship between Beatrice and her new subjects remained estranged: On 18 May 1337, Beatrice was crowned at Prague Castle by John, the bishop of Prague, using the crown of the Czech lands, although the ceremony lacked the usual grand pomp. Shortly after her coronation, in June 1337, Beatrice left Bohemia leaving her son behind, and went to live in Luxembourg. After this, she rarely visited the Bohemian Kingdom.

=== Later years ===
Beatrice ceased to be queen consort following the death of her husband John at the Battle of Crécy on 26 August 1346. Her stepson, now King Charles of Bohemia, confirmed the provisions of her marriage contract. Beatrice, now Dowager Queen of Bohemia, received in perpetuity the lands in the County of Hainaut, the rent of 4,000 livres and the towns of Arlon, Marville and Damvillers as her widow's estate. These revenues were used not only for their own needs, but also for the education of her son. King Charles also left her all the movable property and income from the mines in Kutná Hora. In addition, when her father Duke Louis I of Bourbon died in 1342, she received the sum of 1,000 livres, which was secured from the town of Creil.

Around 1347, Beatrice married for a second time to Eudes II, Lord of Grancey, at her state of Damvillers. Despite her new marriage, she retained the title of Dowager Queen of Bohemia. The couple had no children. Soon after her second marriage, she arranged the betrothal of her son Wenceslaus with the widowed Joanna, Duchess of Brabant, daughter and heiress of John III, Duke of Brabant, who was fifteen years older than he was. The marriage took place in Damvillers four years later, on 17 May 1351.

Beatrice died on 27 December 1383, having outlived her son and all her stepchildren. She was buried in the now-demolished church of the Couvent des Jacobins in Paris - her effigy is now in the Basilica of St Denis.

== Sources ==
- Boehm, Barbara Drake; Fajt, Jiri, eds. (2005). Prague: The Crown of Bohemia, 1347-1437. Yale University Press.
- Goeij, Hana de (2016). "A Breakthrough in C-Section History: Beatrice of Bourbon's Survival in 1337". The New York Times. No. 23 November. ISSN 0362-4331.
- Nagy, Balázs (2001). Autobiography of Emperor Charles IV and his Legend of St Wenceslas. Central European University Press.
- Nicol, Donald M. (1984). The Despotate of Epiros 1267-1479. Cambridge University Press.
- Pařízek, A.; Drška, V.; Říhová, M. (2016). "Prague 1337, the first successful caesarean section in which both mother and child survived may have occurred in the court of John of Luxembourg, King of Bohemia". Ceska Gynekologie. 81 (4 Summer): 321–330. ISSN 1210-7832. PMID 27882755.
- Topping, Peter (1975). "The Morea, 1311–1364". In Hazard, Harry W. (ed.). A History of the Crusades, Vol. III: The Fourteenth and Fifteenth Centuries. University of Wisconsin Press. pp. 104–140. ISBN 0-299-06670-3.
- Tyerman, Christopher (2016). The Practices of Crusading: Image and Action from the Eleventh to the Sixteenth Centuries. Routledge.
- Žůrek, Václav (2022). "The Coronations of Bohemian Kings and Queens". In Šmahel, František; Nodl, Martin; Žůrek, Václav (eds.). Festivities, Ceremonies, and Rituals in the Lands of the Bohemian Crown in the Late Middle Ages. Brill. pp. 9–52.

Beatrice of Bourbon, Queen of Bohemia House of Bourbon Cadet branch of the Capetian dynasty Born: 1320 Died: 23 December 1383
Royal titles
Preceded by Elisabeth of Bohemia	Queen consort of Bohemia; 1334–1346	Succeeded by Blanche of Valois
