= Basilica of the Assumption of Our Lady, Brno =

Basilica of the Assumption of Our Lady in Brno
- Aulae Sanctae Mariae
- Bazilika Nanebevzetí Panny Marie
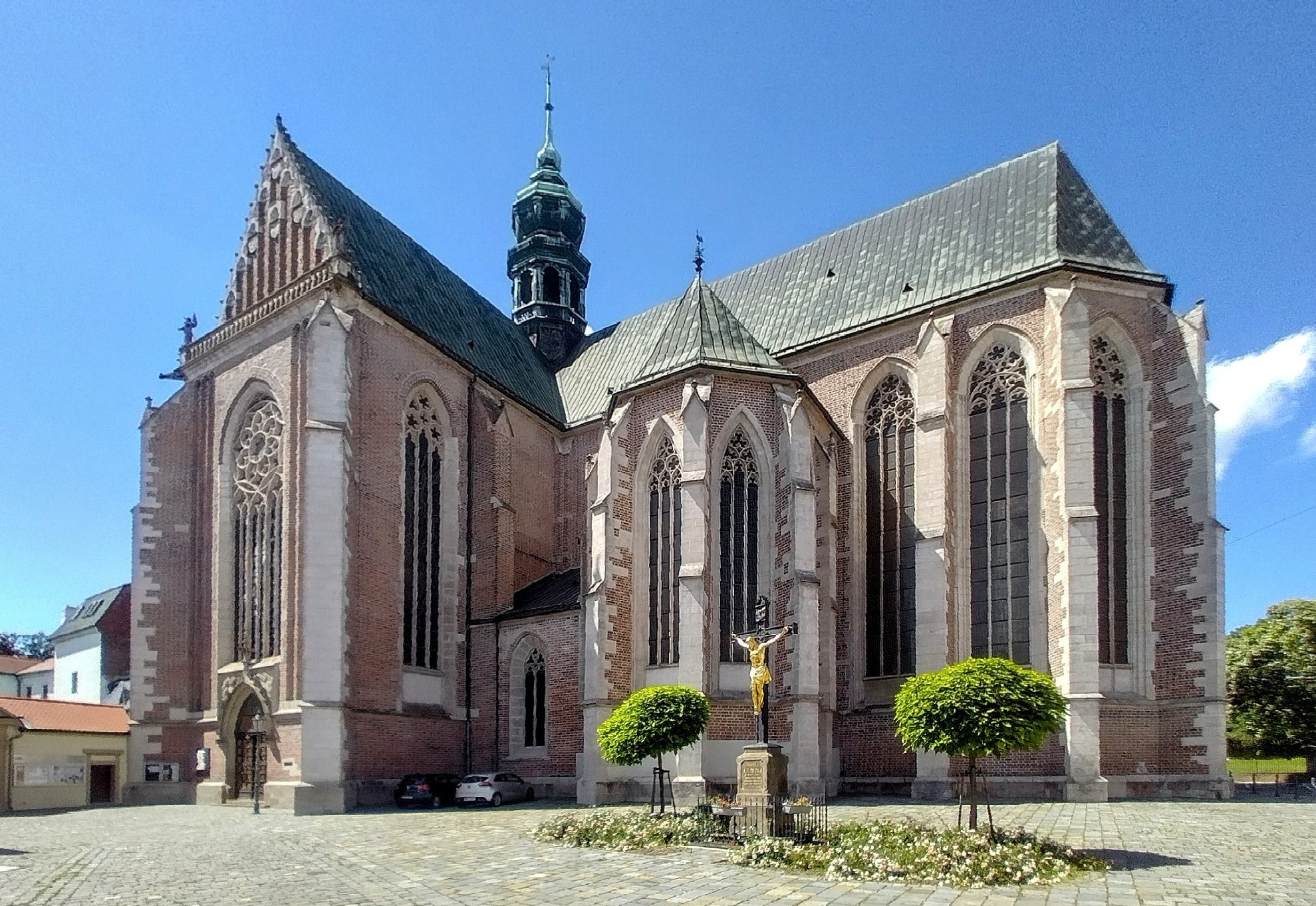

- Location within Czech Republic
- 49°11′27.6″N 16°36′25.2″E
- Location: Brno
- Country: Czech Republic
- Denomination: Roman Catholic
- Website: www.opatstvibrno.cz/bazilika.html

History
- Former name: Virgin Mary
- Status: Active
- Founded: Iith 1323–1334
- Founder: Elisabeth Richeza
- Dedication: Assumption of Our Lady

Architecture
- Functional status: Augustinian Abbey + Parish church
- Style: Gothic
- Years built: 1323–1334

Administration
- Archdiocese: Brno
- Parish: Old Brno

Clergy
- Archbishop: Pavel Konzbul
- Abbot: Lukáš Evžen Martinec (emmeritus)

The Basilica of the Assumption of Our Lady (Czech: Bazilika Nanebevzetí Panny Marie) in Old Brno Abbey is a high Gothic, monumental convent temple. It was founded in 980-1020 by the unknown lord or monarch in Moravia. It was built on the site of an ancient sanctuary from the late 10th century in a short time in the years 1323 to 1334 at the instigation of Queen Elizabeth Richeza. It is the best preserved stylistically coherent and unified temple in Lands of Bohemian Crown.

== History ==
The temple is rightly called a gem of gothic architecture of Lands of Bohemian crown. In 1323 the double queen - royal widow Elizabeth Richeza founded a Cistercian convent (in Latin) called Aulae Sanctae Mariae beside to the oldest pre romanesque parisch church of Oure Lady in Old Brno. After her death in 1335 Elizabeth Richeza found her final resting burial place in the basilica. The spot is marked by the letter „E“ with a small crown carved in the paving of the church.

In the 18th century, the interior of the church was rebuilt in the baroque style. That period also witnessed the finishing of the Baroque buildings of the abbey. In the 1783 the Austrian Emperor Joseph II closter abbey Old Brno was dissolved (Josephinists reforms) and ordered the Augustinians to move to Old Brno from their original monastery of St. Thomas was situated in front of Běhounská Gate (Porta Rhenensis), later Lažansky square (what is now Moravské náměstí).

The Augustinians also had a glorious "silver altar" in baldachin form made in Augsburg and erected when the icon of the Black Madonna was crowned in 1736. At the Feast of the Assumption of Our Lady a pilgrimage is held every year on August 15 in the basilica to worship her as the Protector of the city of Brno.

The abbey church was promoted in 1987 by Pope John Paul II to the rank of a Basilica Minor

== Architecture ==
The abbey church is of typical Cistercian architecture, built in the Gothic style – cruciform layout – main nave, transept and two side aisles. The nave and its flanking aisles have a vaulted by rib vault. The nave and its transept a vaulted ceiling more than 22 m (72 ft) high. The triple choir consists of the right choir in the east and two side chapels in cruciform layout. The crossing is separated from the nave by a massive transverse arches. Whole building body have 34 monumental tracery windows, most of them tripled. Nine of them with lancet arch, 14 equilateral arch. The church was primarily constructed as fair faced brick work (Flemish bond), the first brick Gothic building in the region but using also stone (for arches, quoins, dripstones, embrasures, dripstones, water tables, plinths gargoyles) from the local area – Stránská skála quarry – crinoid limestone. The building has an inside length of 67.45 metres (38 moravian fathoms), width 28.4 metres (16 moravian fathoms) and a height to the ceiling of 23.07 m (75.7 ft). Building as typical Cistercian churches have no tower, only one small spire – on the crossing of central nave and transept. The layout of the basilica consists of one nave and two aisles, with the transept crossing the nave and aisles. South side of the transept have now an entrance.

== Notable individuals ==
- Elizabeth Richeza – Queen
- John of Bohemia – King and cofounder
- Henry of Lipá – Governor and Magnate, cofounder
- Gregor Mendel – abbot and scientist
- Leoš Janáček – composer
- František Klácel – priest
- Francis Thomas Bratranek – priest and Cracow University Rector
- Pavel Křížkovský – composer and friar

== Gallery ==
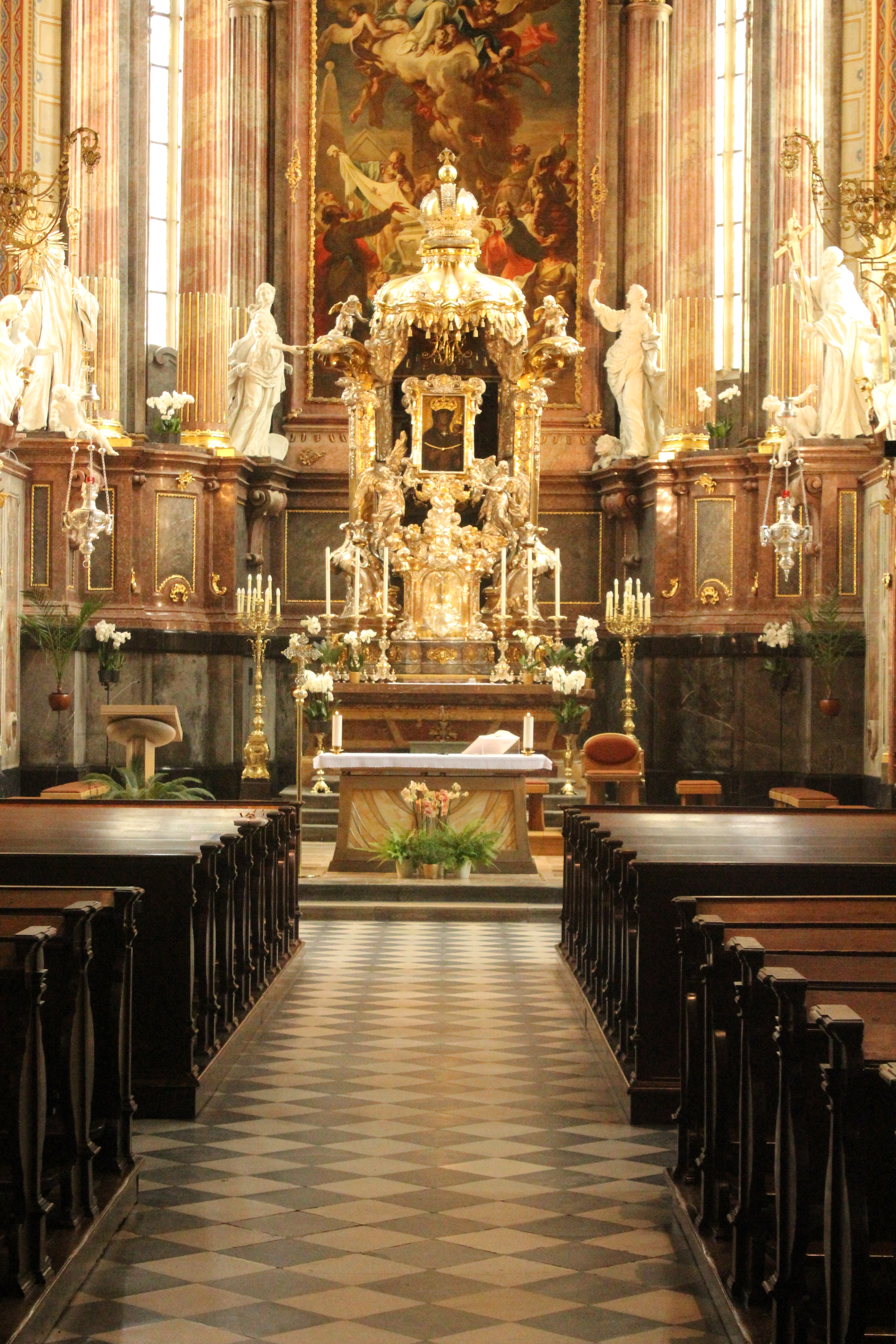
The High altar erected 1736

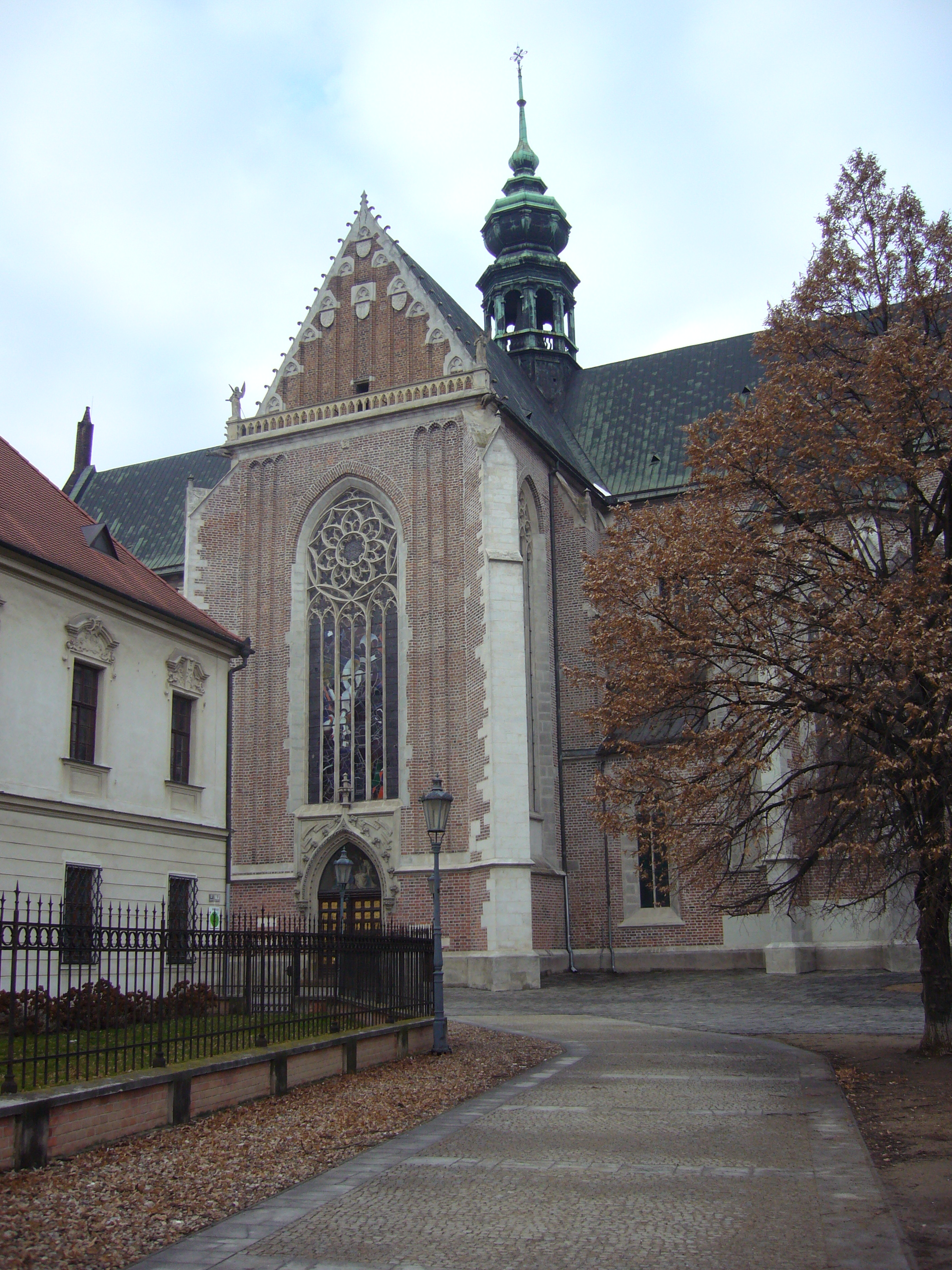
View from the nearby Gregor Mendel square to the north west

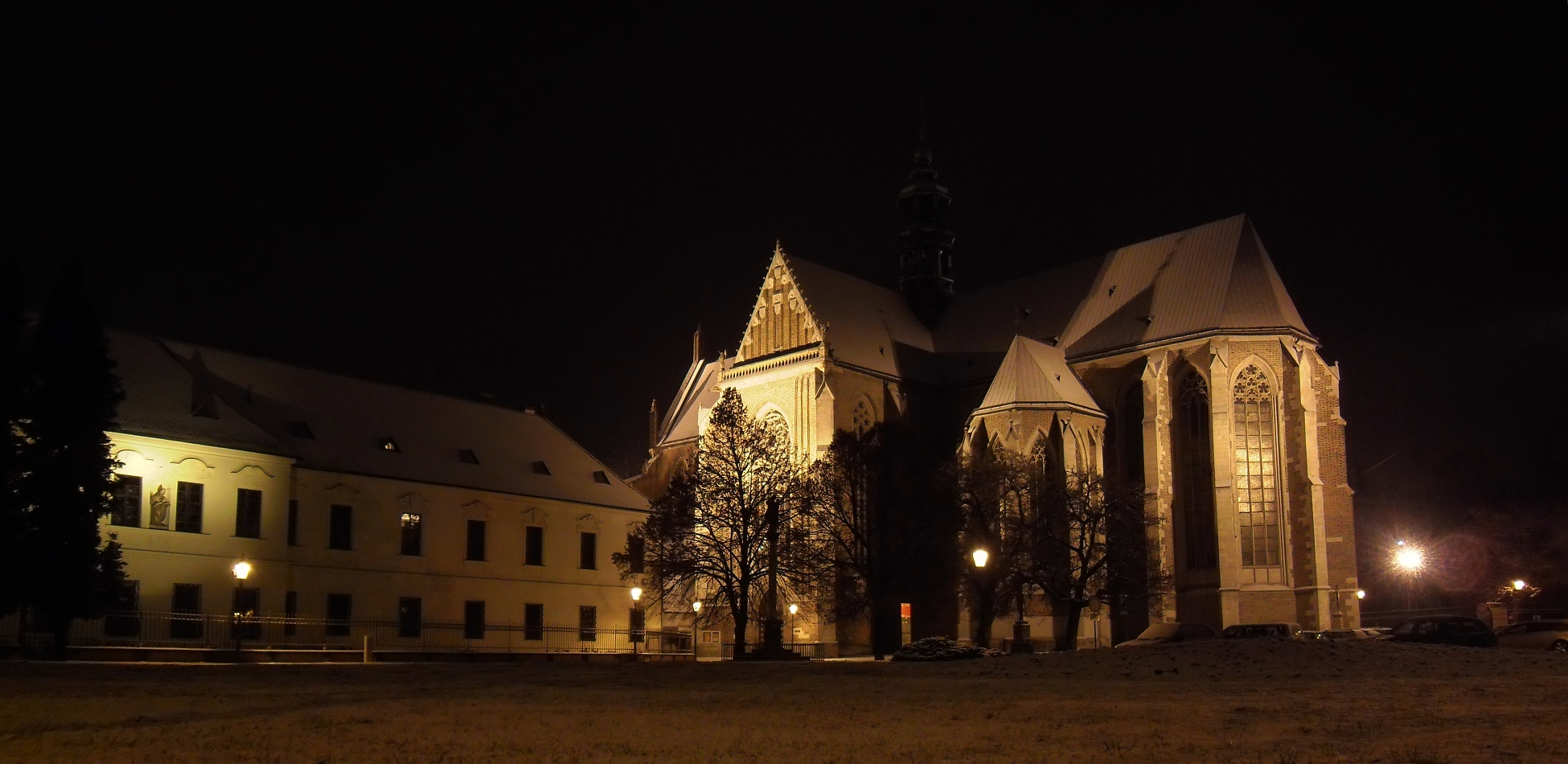
At night, from Abbatial Yard to the south; artificial light highlights the buttresses

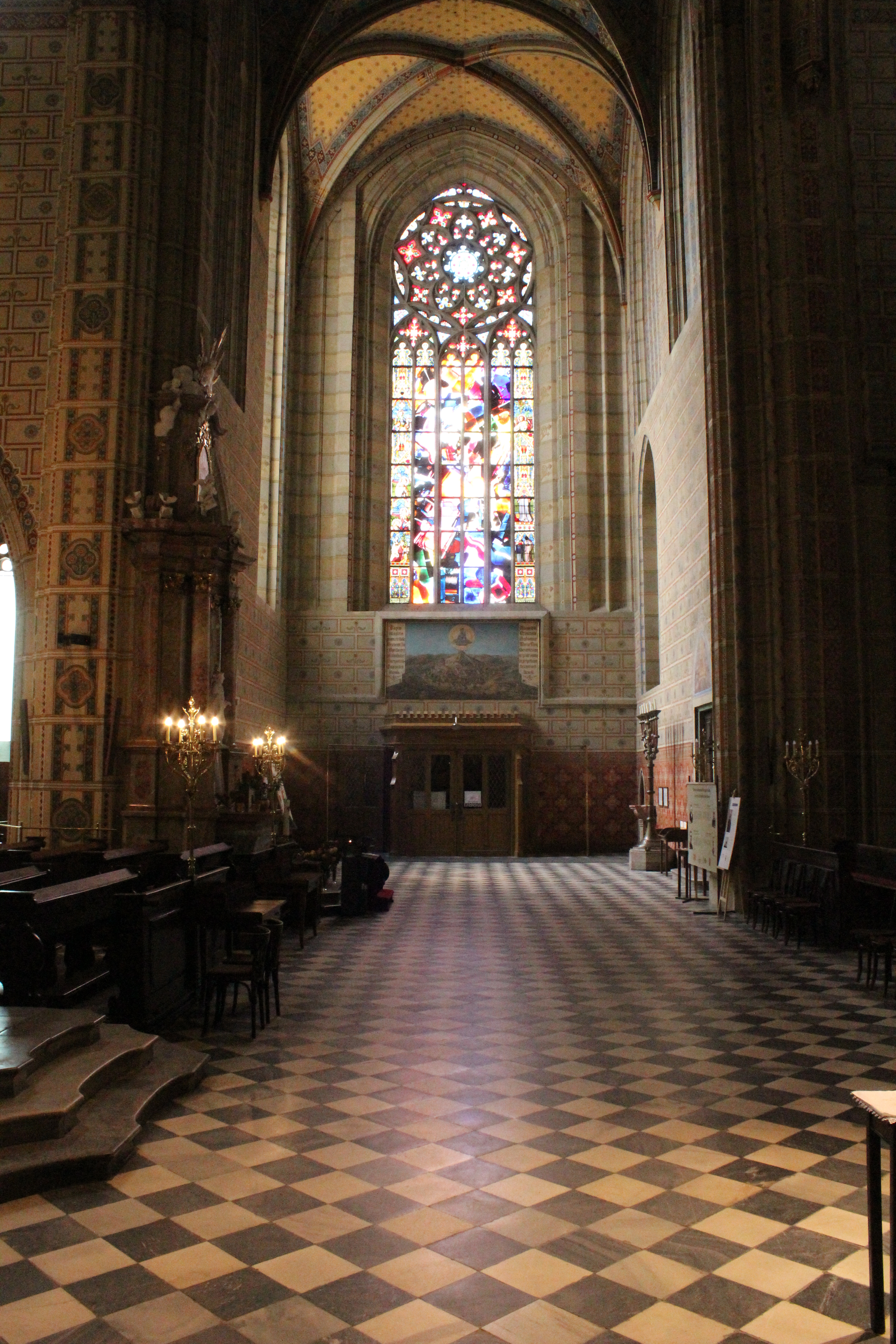
South part of the transept – the rose window

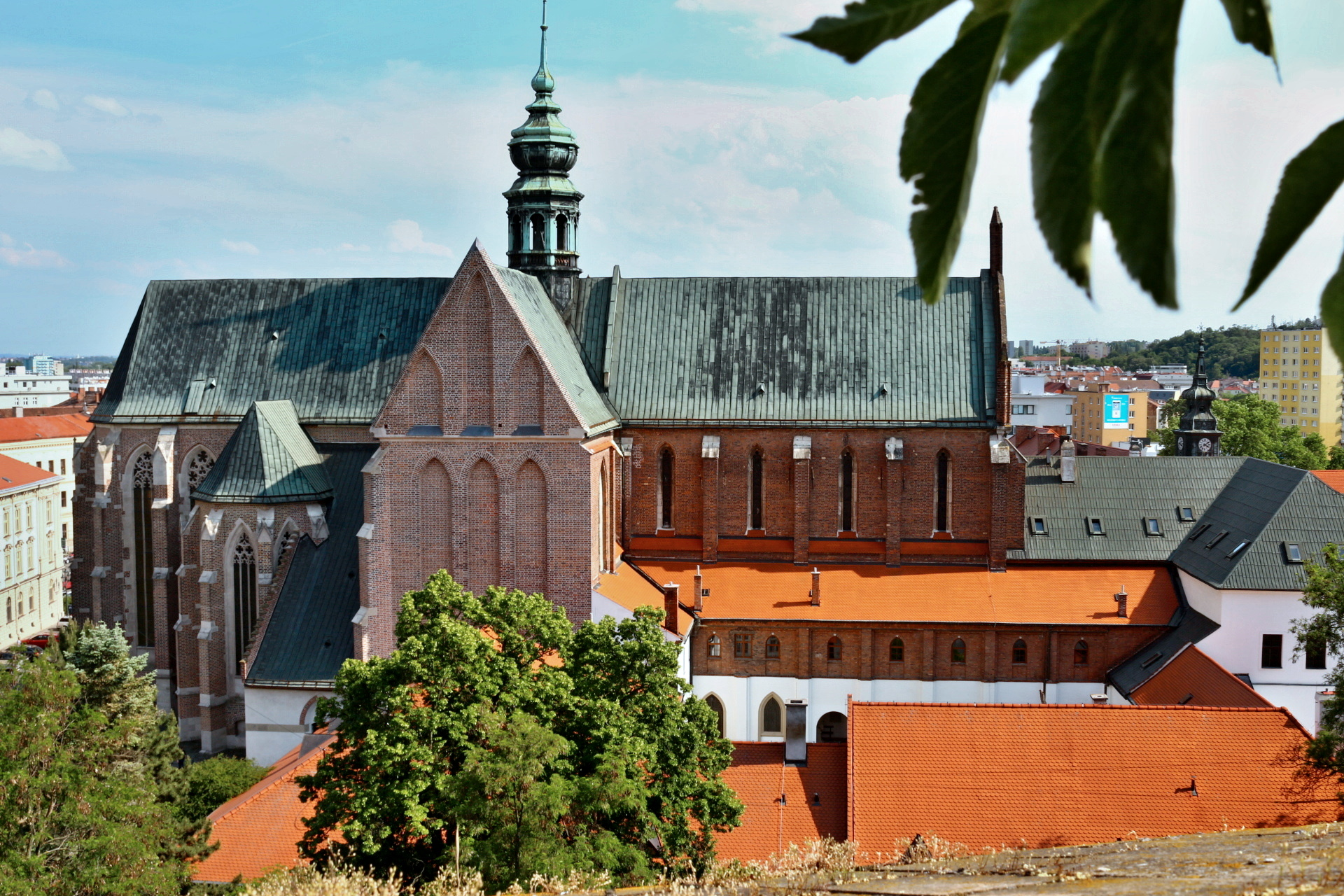
Body of the basilica from the north

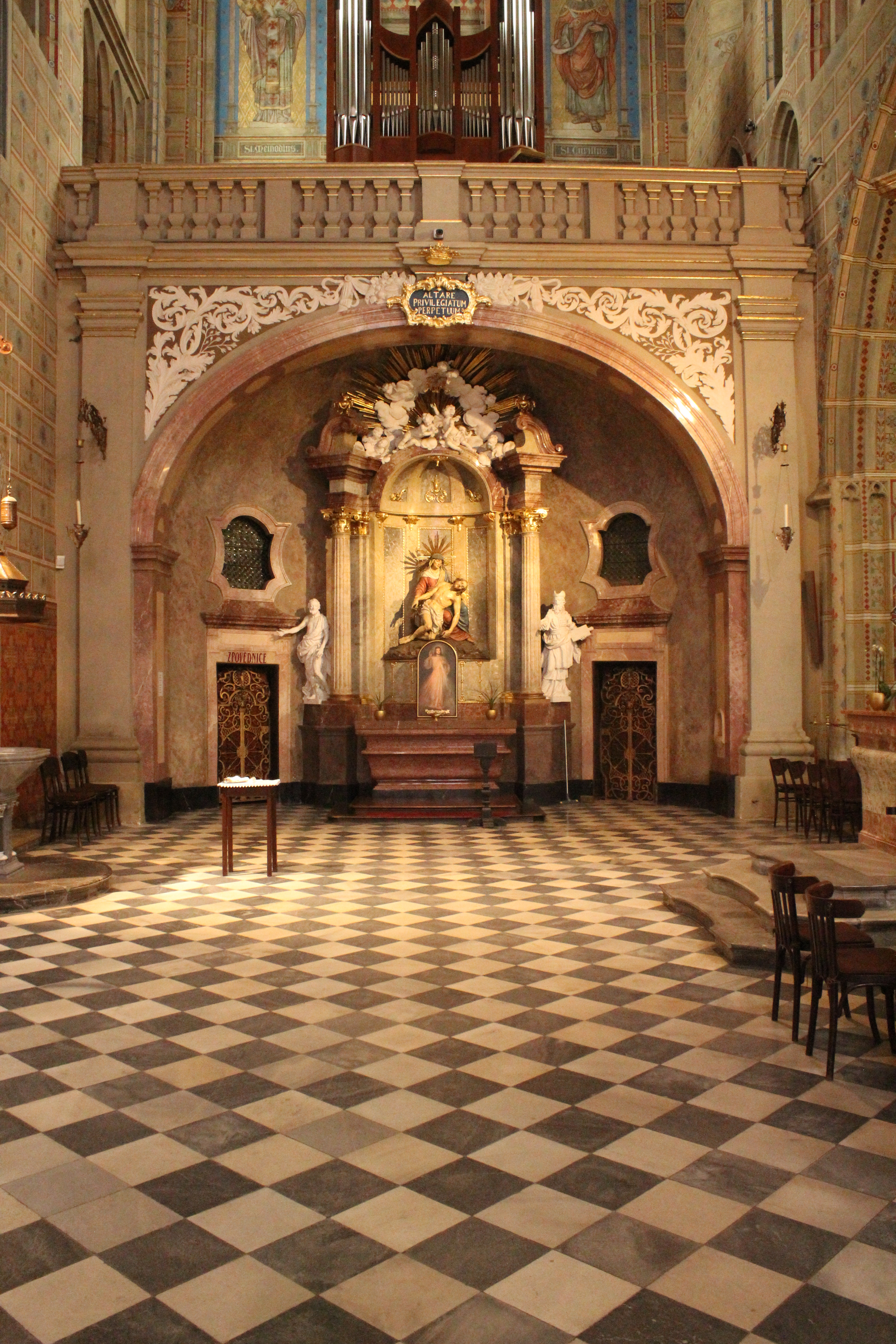
One of the chapels

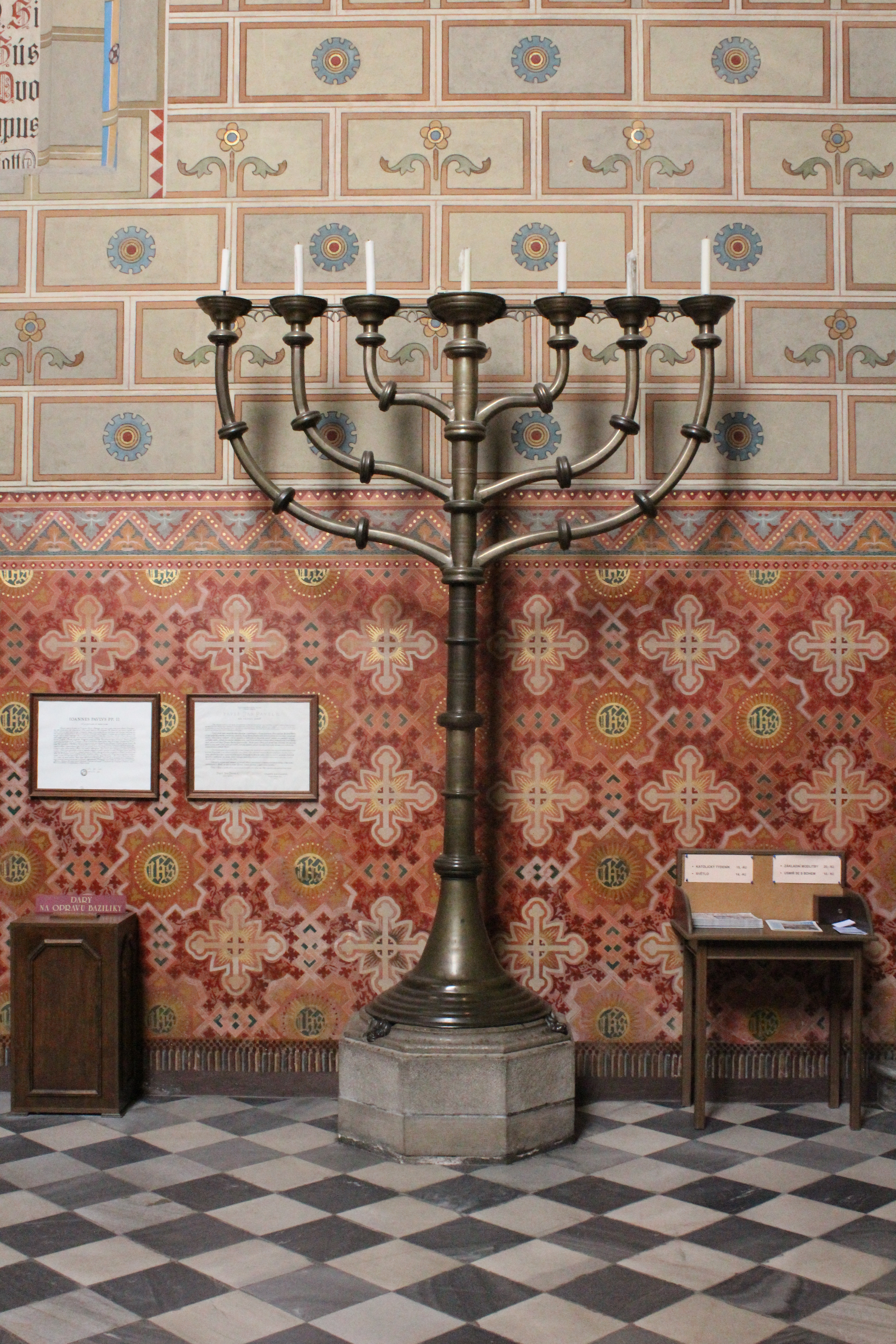
The giant menorah – unknown origin (15th c.)

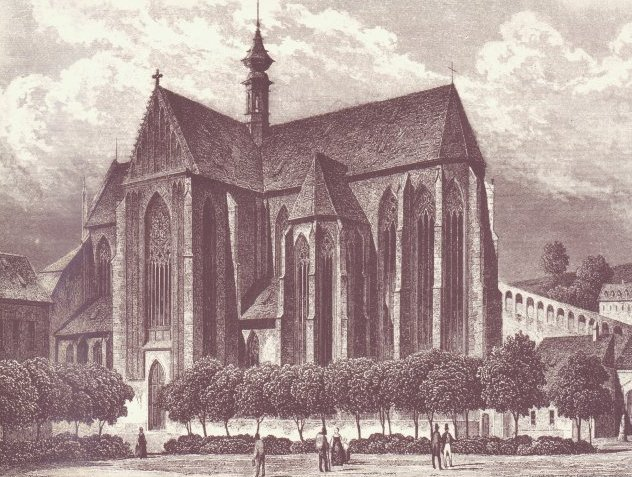
Exterior 19th century graphic

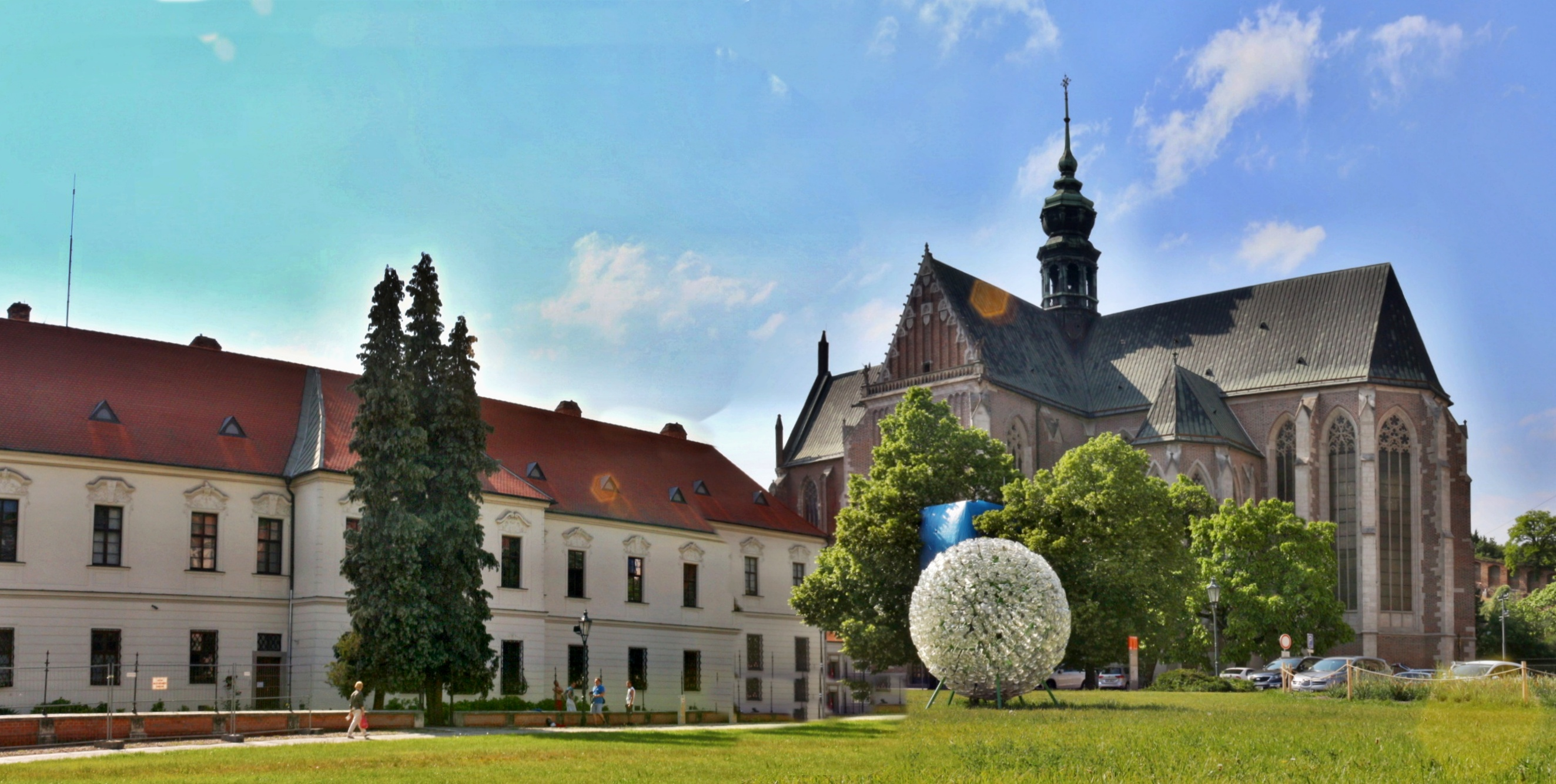
Whole complex of Abbey buildings

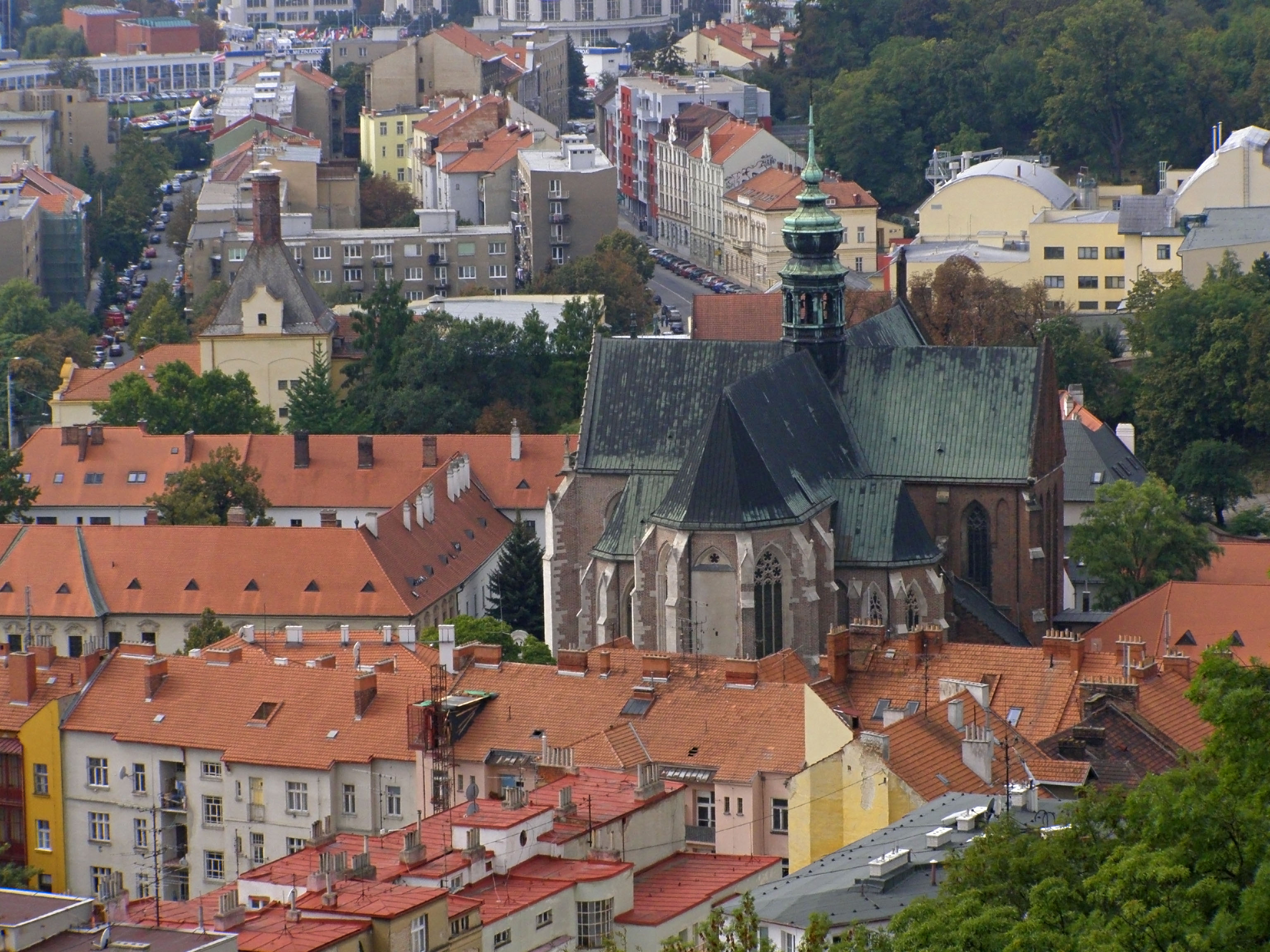
Aerial view from the Špilberk Castle

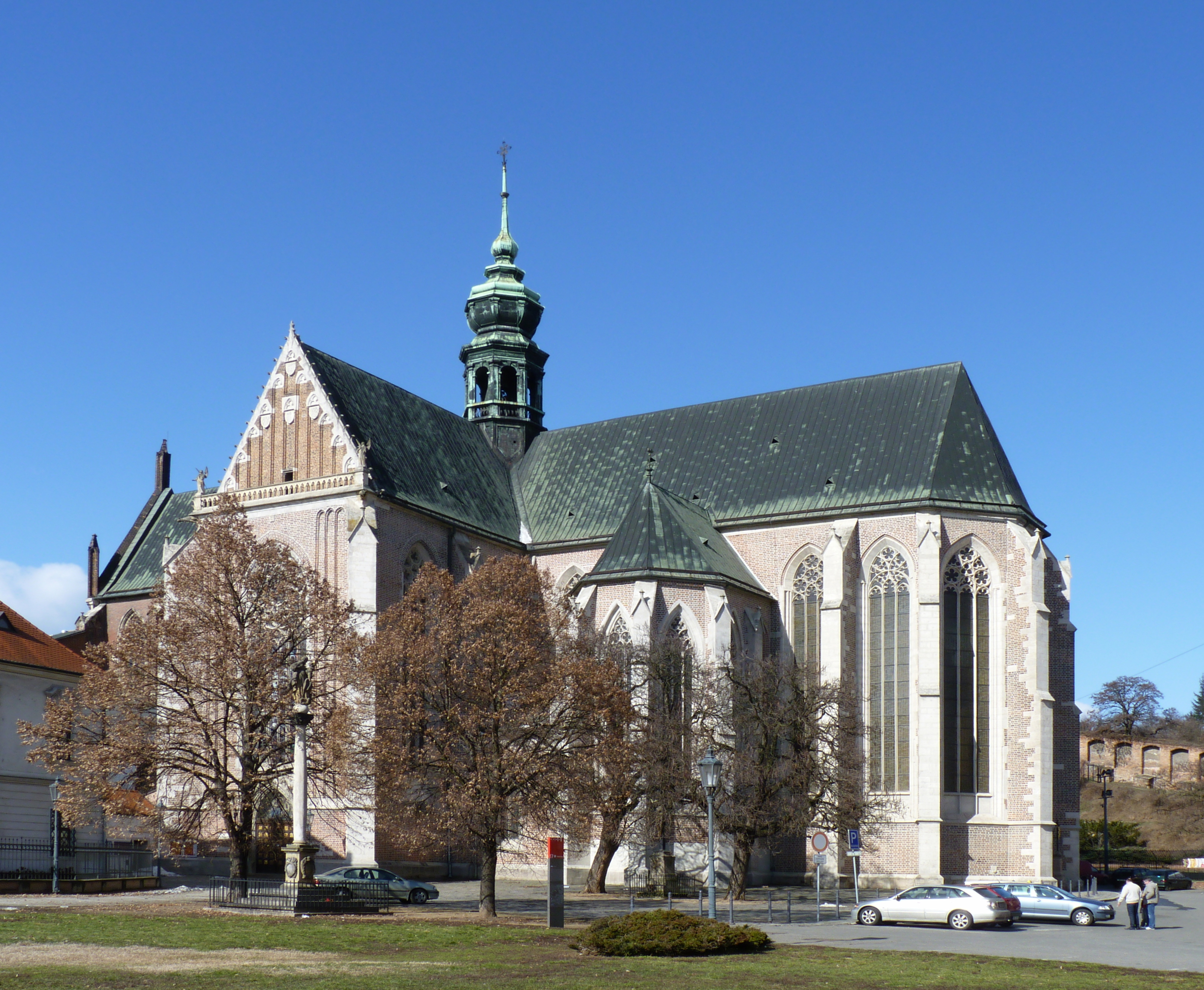
South east view

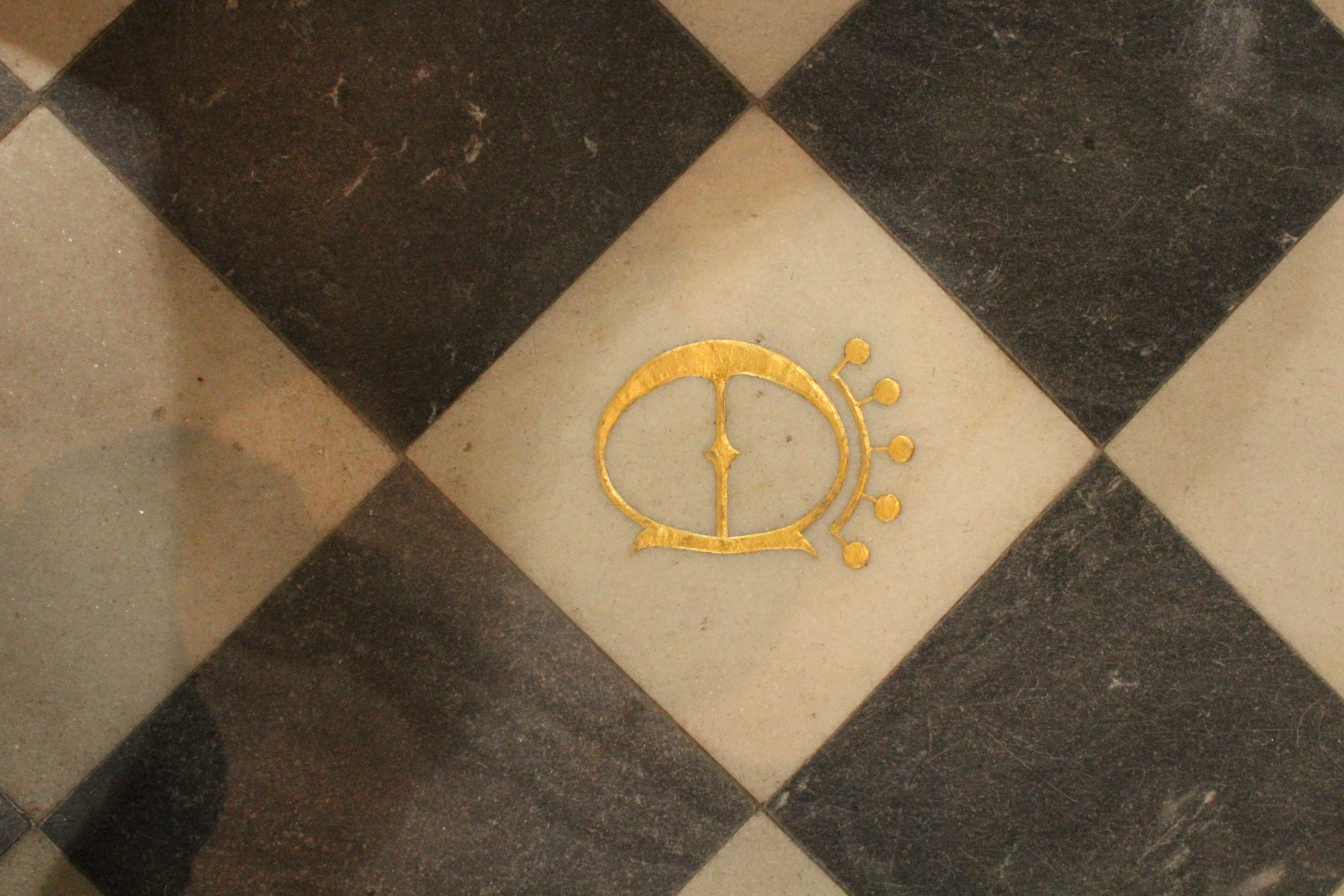
Simple tomb of Queen Elizabeth Richeza

== See also ==
- Czech Gothic architecture
- St Thomas's Abbey, Brno
- Porta coeli Convent
- Cistercian architecture
