= Anne of Bohemia (1290–1313) =

Queen of Bohemia (1306, 1307–1310)

Queen consort of Bohemia
- Tenure: 1306

Queen consort of Bohemia
- Tenure: 1307–1310
- Born: 15 October 1290; Bohemia
- Died: 3 September 1313 (aged 22); Ljubljana, Carniola
- Spouse: Henry of Bohemia
- Dynasty: Přemyslid
- Father: Wenceslaus II of Bohemia
- Mother: Judith of Habsburg

Anne of Bohemia (15 Oct 1290 – 3 Sep 1313) was the eldest surviving daughter of Wenceslaus II of Bohemia and Poland and his first wife Judith of Habsburg. Her siblings included Elizabeth of Bohemia and Wenceslaus III of Bohemia.

== Family ==
Anne was born in 1290 in the Kingdom of Bohemia. Her mother, Judith, died in 1297 when Anne was seven years old. Of her mother's ten children, only four lived to adulthood: Wenceslaus, Anne, Elizabeth and Margaret.

In 1300 Anne's widowed father, Wenceslaus, remarried a Polish princess called Elizabeth Richenza from the genus Piast dynasty. Anne's father then gained the Crown of Poland for the next five years (he died in 1305). They had a daughter, Agnes of Bohemia.

Her father also had numerous illegitimate children, including Jan Volek (?? – 27 September 1351), bishop of Olomouc.

== Marriage ==
In 1306 Anne married Henry of Carinthia, a son of Meinhard, Duke of Carinthia and Elisabeth of Bavaria.

After the murder of Anne's brother, Wenceslaus, in 1306, Anne's husband was elected King of Bohemia and titular King of Poland. However, all power was soon taken over by Rudolf of Habsburg. Anne and Henry then fled to Carinthia out of reach from Rudolph. Rudolph only reigned for one year and on his death Henry assumed the throne of Bohemia again.

The royal couple turned their attention to Anne's younger unmarried sister Elisabeth. They wished to have her married but Elisabeth refused every suitor that came forward. In 1310 Elisabeth married John of Luxembourg. This union caused Anne and Elisabeth to fall out.

By 1310 John and Elisabeth occupied Prague; Anne and Henry were sent back to live in Carinthia in exile. She died in 1313 in Ljubljana, the capital of Carniola, then part of her husband's domains. She was buried in Bolzano, Tyrol. She died aged only twenty two and childless. Her husband married twice more.

== Sources in English ==
- Anne's Bohemia; Czech Literature and Society, 1310–1420, by Alfred Thomas University of Minnesota Press, 1998, Preface by David Wallace

Anne of Bohemia (1290–1313) Přemyslid dynasty Born: 1290 Died: 1313
Royal titles
Preceded by Viola Elisabeth of Cieszyn	Queen consort of Bohemia; 1306	Succeeded by Elizabeth Richeza of Poland
Preceded by Elizabeth Richeza of Poland	Queen consort of Bohemia; 1307–1310	Succeeded by Elizabeth of Bohemia
