= Elizabeth of Bohemia (1292–1330) =

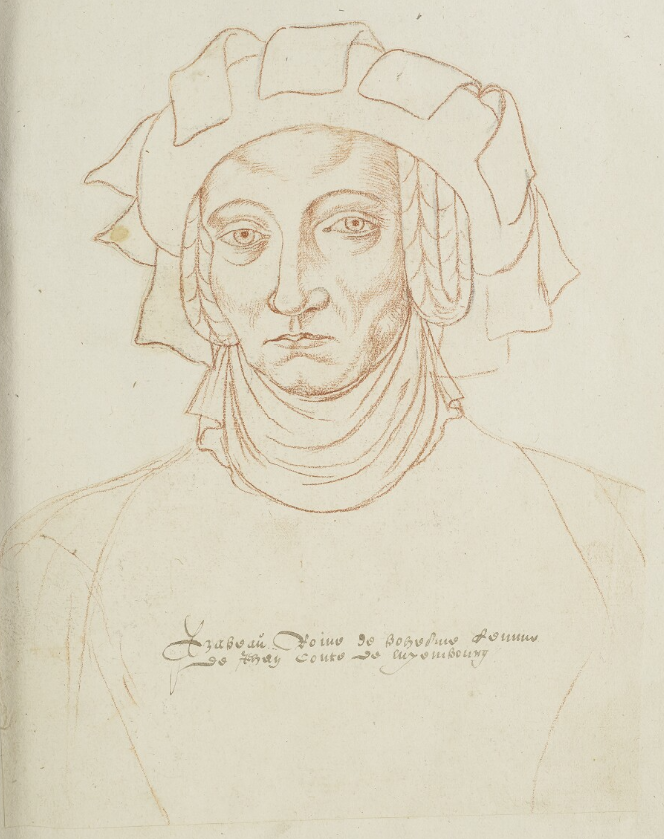
- Elizabeth of Bohemia by Jacques Le Boucq c. 1570

Queen consort of Bohemia
- Tenure: 1310–1330
- Coronation: 7 February 1311
- Born: 20 January 1292
- Died: 28 September 1330 (aged 38); Bohemia
- Spouse: John of Luxembourg (m. 1310)
- Issue: Margaret, Duchess of Bavaria; Bonne, Duchess of Normandy; Charles IV, Holy Roman Emperor; John Henry, Margrave of Moravia; Anna, Duchess of Austria
- House: Přemyslovci
- Father: Wenceslaus II of Bohemia
- Mother: Judith of Habsburg

Elizabeth of Bohemia (Czech: Eliška Přemyslovna) (20 January 1292 – 28 September 1330) was a princess of the Bohemian Přemyslid dynasty who became Queen of Bohemia as the first wife of King John the Blind. She was the mother of Emperor Charles IV, King of Bohemia, and the daughter of Judith of Habsburg, member of the House of Habsburg.

== Childhood ==
Elizabeth was the daughter of Wenceslaus II of Bohemia and Judith of Habsburg. Her mother died when she was five years old, and of her ten children only four of them lived to adulthood: Wenceslaus, Anne, Elizabeth and Margaret. Elizabeth and her siblings also had a half-sister called Agnes. Six years after the death of her mother, her father remarried, to a Polish princess, Elizabeth Richeza, from the Piast dynasty. Elizabeth's father then gained the Crown of Poland.

Many notable events occurred during Elizabeth's youth, including a devastating fire at Prague Castle in 1303, the death of her father, and the assassination of her brother Wenceslaus. Elizabeth was orphaned by the age of thirteen and lived with her sister, Anne. Her other sister, Margaret was married at the age of seven to Bolesław III the Generous, after he had come to the court of Bohemia with his mother, Elisabeth of Greater Poland.

Elizabeth went to live with her aunt Kunigunde in a nunnery near Prague Castle. Without a mother, Elizabeth was strongly influenced by her aunt. Her sister-in-law, Viola of Teschen and her stepmother, Elizabeth Richeza, came to live with Anne and Elizabeth until the relationship between the sisters deteriorated.

== The fight for the throne ==
In 1306, after the murder of Elizabeth's brother Wenceslaus, Elizabeth's brother-in-law Henry became King of Bohemia. Elizabeth was now the only unmarried princess in the family, and at fourteen she was considered a good age to marry, and as a result played an important role in the power struggle for the Kingdom of Bohemia.

The quarrels of the Bohemian throne between Henry of Bohemia and Rudolph of Habsburg resulted in Rudolph taking Bohemia and marrying Queen Elizabeth Richeza. Elizabeth went to live in Prague Castle with her brother's widow, Viola Elisabeth of Cieszyn. However, on Rudolph's death in 1307 the crown returned to her brother-in-law and sister, who wanted Elizabeth to marry the Lord of Bergova (Otto of Löbdaburg) for political reasons. Elizabeth refused to marry Otto and so Elizabeth and Anne fell out with each other.

An opposition group was formed against Henry and Anne, with Elizabeth as the figurehead.

== Marriage to John of Luxembourg ==
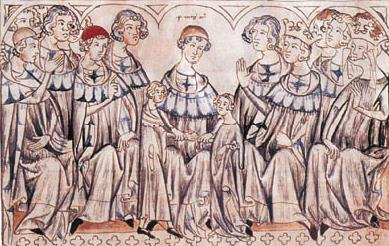
Wedding of John of Luxembourg and Elizabeth in Speyer in 1310

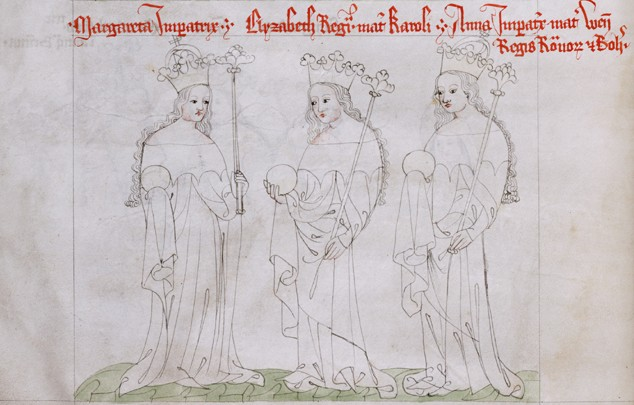
Elisabeth (centre) with her mother-in-law Margaret (left) and daughter-in-law Anna (right)

Elizabeth married John of Luxembourg, the son of Holy Roman Emperor Henry VII, shortly after his 14th birthday. The wedding took place on 1 September 1310, after John was forced to invade Bohemia. Henry and Anne fled to Carinthia, where Anne died in 1313. The coronation of John and Elizabeth took place on 7 February 1311.

The marriage was initially a disaster, as Elizabeth needed to give birth to a son to prevent the inheritance of the descendants of her sister, Margaret, but did not have a son until six years into the marriage, when she gave birth to Charles IV, Holy Roman Emperor.

The marriage improved for a while as the succession was safely secured, but after a while, Elizabeth grew jealous of John, who had listened to her but whose political opinions differed to hers. In 1319 an alleged plot was uncovered, to depose John and replace him with their eldest son Charles. John had the culprits punished.

John decided to prevent his wife from interfering in the education of their children, and took the three eldest children: Margaret, Bonne, and Charles, from Elizabeth's custody. Queen Elizabeth then lived at Mělník Castle and young Charles was imprisoned by his own father, before being sent to France in 1323, when he was 7 years old. He never saw his mother again.

== Later years ==
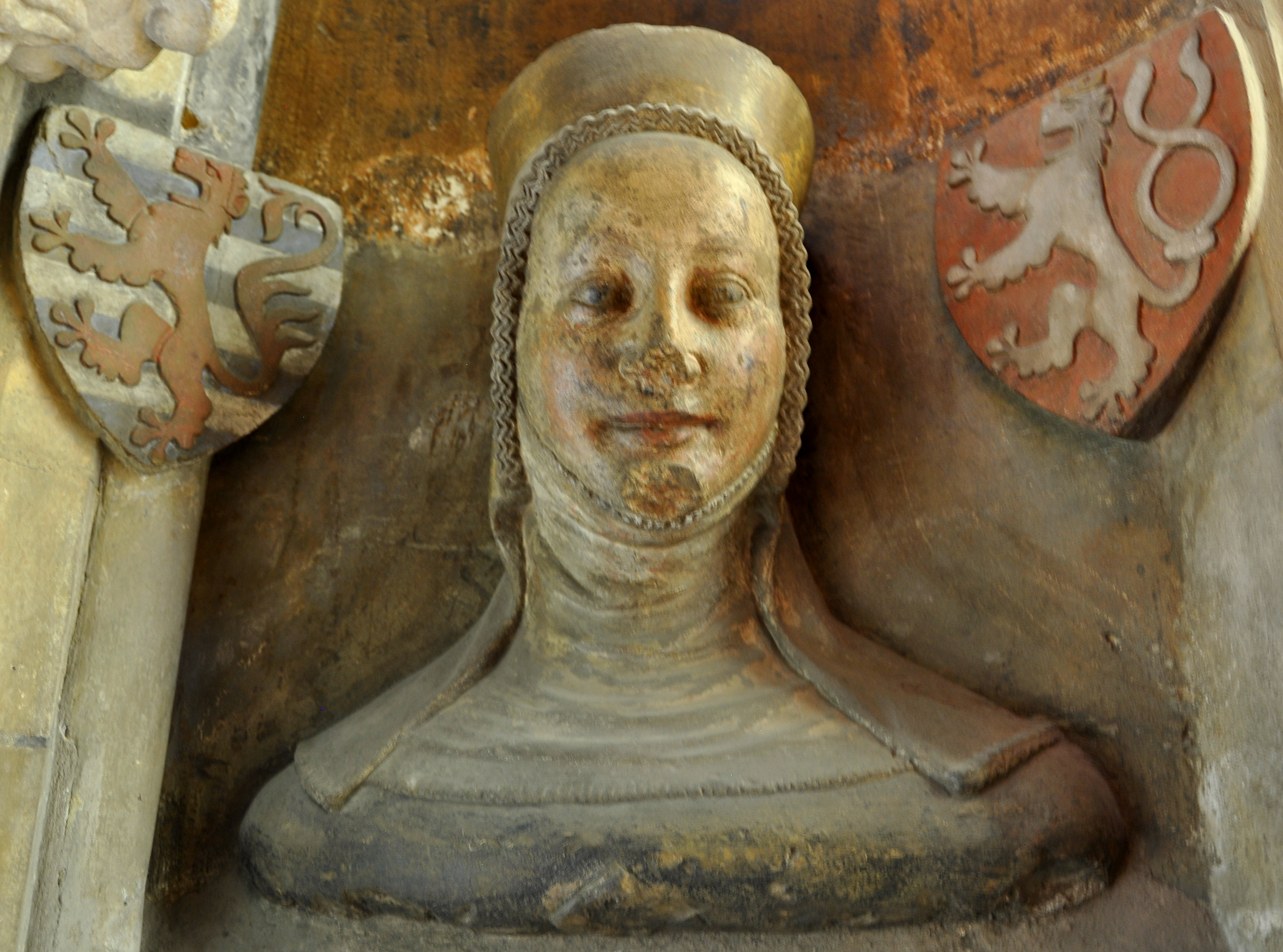
Bust of Elisabeth of Bohemia from the triforium of St. Vitus Cathedral in Prague from the 1370s.

In total isolation and abandoned by all, Elizabeth left Bohemia and went to live in exile in Bavaria. Her actions were considered an act of open hostility towards John and his nobles. In exile, Elizabeth gave birth to her last children, twin daughters Anne and Elizabeth. John did not support Elizabeth during her exile. Elizabeth returned to Bohemia in 1325, with her daughter Anne, Elizabeth having died a few months before. When she returned she was ill, but she lived for another five years. Her final years were affected by her lack of finances, which made her unable to maintain a court. She eventually died of tuberculosis in 1330, at the age of thirty-eight.

== Children ==
Elizabeth and John were parents to seven children

- Margaret (8 July 1313 – 11 July 1341, Prague), married in Straubing 12 August 1328 to Henry XIV, Duke of Bavaria
- Bonne (21 May 1315 – 11 September 1349, Maubuisson Abbey, Saint-Ouen-l'Aumône), married in Melun 6 August 1332 to King John II of France
- Charles IV (14 May 1316 – 29 November 1378), King of Bohemia and Holy Roman Emperor
- Přemysl Otakar ("Otto") (22 November 1318 – 20 April 1320), Prince of Bohemia
- John Henry (12 February 1322, Mělník – 12 November 1375), Margrave of Moravia
- Anna (1323 – 3 September 1338), twin of Elisabeth, married 16 February 1335 to Duke Otto of Austria
- Elizabeth (1323–1324)

== Sources ==
- Agnew, Hugh LeCaine (2004). The Czechs and the Lands of the Bohemian Crown. Hoover Institution Press. ISBN 978-0-8179-4492-6.
- Antonín, Robert (2017). The Ideal Ruler in Medieval Bohemia. Brill.
- Boehm, Barbara Drake; Fajt, Jiri, eds. (2005). Prague: The Crown of Bohemia, 1347-1437. Yale University Press.
- Herde, Peter (2000). "The Empire:From Adolf of Nassau to Lewis of Bavaria, 1292-1347". In Jones, Michael (ed.). The New Cambridge Medieval History: Volume 6, C.1300-c.1415. Cambridge University Press.
- Michaud, Claude (2000). "The kingdoms of central Europe in the fourteenth century". In Jones, Michael (ed.). The New Cambridge Medieval History: Volume 6, C.1300-c.1415. Cambridge University Press.
- Opačić, Zoë (2009). Prague and Bohemia: Medieval Art, Architecture and Cultural Exchange in Central Europe. British Archaeological Association.

Elizabeth of Bohemia (1292–1330) Přemyslid dynasty Born: 20 January 1292 Died: 28 September 1330
Royal titles
Preceded by Anne of Bohemia	Queen consort of Bohemia; 1310–1330	Succeeded by Beatrice of Bourbon
