= Viola of Teschen =

Czech queen (d. 1317)

Queen consort of Bohemia
- Tenure: 1305–1306

Queen consort of Poland
- Tenure: 1305–1306

Queen consort of Hungary
- Tenure: 1305
- Born: ca. 1291
- Died: 21 September 1317 (aged ~26); Bohemia
- Burial: Vyšší Brod Monastery
- Spouse: Wenceslaus III of Bohemia (m. 1305; died 1306) Peter I of Rosenberg
- House: Piast
- Father: Mieszko I, Duke of Cieszyn

Viola of Teschen, later known as Viola Elizabeth (Polish: Wiola Elżbieta cieszyńska, Czech: Viola Alžběta Těšínská) (c. 1291 – 21 September 1317), was Queen of Bohemia and Poland by marriage to Wenceslaus III of Bohemia.

She was the daughter of Mieszko I, Duke of Cieszyn, by his unknown wife. She was named after her paternal great-grandmother Viola, wife of Duke Casimir I of Opole.

== Queen of Bohemia and Poland ==
Viola married young King Wenceslaus III of Bohemia and Poland on 5 October 1305 in Brno. The reasons for the marriage are not obvious: although later chroniclers describe her beauty Viola, her father Duke Mieszko I was only one of many Wenceslaus' vassals. The main reason may have been the strategic position of Cieszyn between the Kingdoms of Bohemia and Poland. Four days after the wedding on 9 October, Wenceslaus III annulled his long-time engagement to Elizabeth, daughter of King Andrew III of Hungary and with this renounced his claims over the Hungarian crown.

After her marriage, Viola took the name Elizabeth, but her union with the King wasn't completely happy, because of her husband's lifestyle and the strong opposition of the Bohemian nobility, who wanted to prevent this "lower" union. Ten months later, on 4 August 1306, King Wenceslaus III was murdered in Olomouc under mysterious circumstances, leaving Viola as a fifteen-year-old widow. The union failed to produce an heir.

With little money and nowhere to go, Viola probably stayed with her sisters-in-law, Anna and Elisabeth, in a nunnery. The princesses were fighting for the throne of Bohemia, but Viola stayed away. Later, she mainly resided in Moravia, where she had dowry towns.

== Second marriage and death ==
After the arrest of Henry of Lipá, Queen Elisabeth of Bohemia and her husband John of Luxembourg tried to draw to their side the powerful nobleman Peter I of Rosenberg (Petr I. z Rožmberka), who, at the time, was engaged to Henry of Lipá's daughter. Soon, Peter I of Rosenberg cancelled his betrothal and entered in an alliance with the Bohemian King and Queen. In order to reinforce his bonds with his new ally, King John gave him the hand of Dowager Queen Viola. The marriage came in 1316, but was childless and short-lived: Viola died on 21 September 1317, and was buried in the vault of the House of Rosenberg in the Vyšší Brod Monastery.

== Notes ==
Viola of Teschen Piast Dynasty Born: ca. 1291 Died: 21 September 1317
Royal titles
Preceded by Agnes of Austria	Queen consort of Hungary; 1305	Succeeded by Maria of Bytom
Preceded by Elisabeth Richeza of Poland	Queen consort of Bohemia; 1305–1306	Succeeded by Anna of Bohemia
Preceded by Elisabeth Richeza of Poland	Queen consort of Poland; 1305–1306	Succeeded by Jadwiga of Kalisz
