= List of Bohemian royal consorts =

Royal consorts of Bohemia

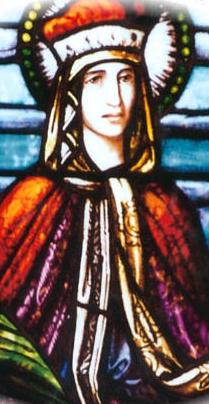
Saint Ludmila, first Duchess of Bohemia, wife of Bořivoj I, progenitress of Czech rulers and also their wives.

This is a list of the royal consorts of the rulers of Bohemia.

The first Duchess of Bohemia (česká kněžna) was St. Ludmila, while the first Queen of Bohemia (česká královna) was Świętosława of Poland. Some of them were (like their husbands) not crowned.

There was only one queen regnant in Czech history - Maria Theresa. Nevertheless, some female royal consorts were highly influential in the country's history, having ruled as regents for their minor children and heirs, as well as having a great influence over their spouses.

The title was used until 1918, when husband of the last queen was deposed.

== House of Přemysl ==
=== Duchesses of Bohemia ===
- 874–888/891: Ludmila of Bohemia (Svatá Ludmila), wife of Bořivoj I, d. assassinated 15 September 921 in Tetín Castle
- 906–921: Drahomíra (princess Drahomíra ze Stodor), wife of Vratislav I, d. after 935
- 935–972: Biagota, wife of Boleslav I
- ?–999: Emma of Melnik (Emma Regina or Hemma princess of Burgundy), original evident Queen of France, widow from King Lothair of France (d. 986), circa 989 second wife of Boleslaus I, d. 1005/1006
- ?–?: Božena (Křesinova), second morganatic wife of duke Oldřich
- 1034–1055: Judith of Schweinfurt (Jitka ze Svinibrodu/ Babenberská), (from House of Babenberg), wife of Bretislaus I, d. 1058
- 1055–1061: Ida of Wettin (Ida Wettinská), wife of Spytihněv II, d. a. 1061
- 1061–1062: Adelaide of Hungary (Adléta Uherská), first wife of Vratislaus II, d. 1062

Picture	Name	Father	Birth	Marriage	Became Queen	Ceased to be Queen	Death	Spouse
	Świętosława of Poland (Svatava Polská)	Casimir I of Poland	1046-1048	1062 since 1085 first Queen of Bohemia		14 Jan 1092	1 Sep 1126	Vratislaus II

- 1092: Wirpirk of Tengling (Virpirka z Tenglingu), wife of Konrád I Brněnský
- 1094–1100: Lukarta of Bogen (Lukarta z Bogenu), wife of Břetislav II
- 1100–1107: Helbirga of Austria (Helbirga Babenberská), wife of Bořivoj II, d. 1142
- 1111–1117: Richeza of Berg (Richenza z Bergu), wife of Vladislav I, d. 1125
- 1117–1120: Helbirga of Austria (Helbirga Babenberská), wife of Bořivoj II, d. 1142
- 1120–1125: Richeza of Berg (Richenza z Bergu), wife of Vladislav I, d. 1125
- 1125–1140: Adelaide of Hungary (Adleyta Arpádovna), wife of Soběslav I, d. 1140
- 1140–1150: Gertrude of Babenberg (Gertruda Babenberská), first wife of Vladislaus II, d. 1150

Picture	Name	Father	Birth	Marriage	Became Queen	Ceased to be Queen	Death	Spouse
	Judith of Thuringia (Judita Durynská)	Louis I, Landgrave of Thuringia	after 1135	1153 since 1158 second Queen of Bohemia		1172	after 1174	Vladislaus II

- 1172–1173: Elisabeth of Hungary (Alžběta Uherská), wife of Frederick I, d. after 1189
- 1173/7–1178: Elisabeth of Poland (Eliška Polská), wife of Soběslav II, d. 1209
- 1178–1189: Elisabeth of Hungary (Alžběta Uherská), wife of Frederick I, d. after 1189
- 1189–1191: Hellicha of Wittelsbach (Hellicha z Wittelsbachu), wife of Konrád II Ota, d. after 1198

=== Queens of Bohemia ===
Picture	Name	Father	Birth	Marriage	Became Queen	Ceased to be Queen	Death	Spouse
	Adelheid of Meissen (Adléta Míšeňská)	Otto II, Margrave of Meissen	1160+	1178	1198	1199	2 Feb 1211	Ottokar I
	Constance of Hungary (Konstancie Uherská)	Béla III of Hungary	1181	1199		1230	6 Dec 1240	Ottokar I
	Kunigunde of Hohenstaufen (Kunhuta Švábská/Štaufská)	Philip of Swabia	1200	1224	1230	13 Sep 1248		Wenceslaus I
	Margaret, Duchess of Austria (Markéta Babenberská)	Leopold VI, Duke of Austria	1204	Feb 1252	1253	1260 divorced	29 Oct 1266	Ottokar II
	Kunigunda of Slavonia (Kunhuta Haličská/Uherská)	Rostislav of Slavonia	1245	25 Oct 1261		1278	9 Sep 1285	Ottokar II
	Judith of Habsburg (Guta Habsburská)	Rudolf I of Habsburg	13 Mar 1271	24 Jan 1285'		18 Jun 1297		Wenceslaus II
	Elisabeth Richeza of Poland (Eliška Rejčka)	Przemysl II of Poland	1 Sep 1286	1300	1303	1305	18 October 1335	Wenceslaus II
	Viola of Teschen (Viola Těšínská)	Mieszko I, Duke of Teschen	c. 1290	1305		1306	21 September 1317	Wenceslaus III

== Non-dynastic ==
Picture	Name	Father	Birth	Marriage	Became Queen	Ceased to be Queen	Death	Spouse
	Elisabeth Richeza of Poland (Eliška Rejčka)	Przemysl II of Poland	1 Sep 1286	1306	1306	1307	18 October 1335	Rudolph I
	Anne of Bohemia (Anna Přemyslovna)	Wenceslaus II	10 Oct 1290	1306	1306/7	1310	3 Sep 1313	Henry

== House of Luxemburg ==
Picture	Name	Father	Birth	Marriage	Became Queen	Ceased to be Queen	Death	Spouse
	Elisabeth of Bohemia (Elisabeth of Premysled, Eliška Přemyslovna)	Václav II	20 Jan 1292	1 Sep 1310 in the Cathédrale in Spier (Germany) / Queen from 9 Dec 1310		28 Sep 1330 in Prag - Vyšehrad Castle (Czech Republic)		John
	Beatrice of Bourbon (Beatrice Bourbonská)	Louis I, Duke of Bourbon	circa 1315-16	Dec 1334 in France / Dec 1334		26 Aug 1346	23 Dec 1383	John
	Blanche of Valois (Blanka z Valois)	Charles of Valois	1316	15 May 1323 in Paris (France)	26 Aug 1346	1 Aug 1348 in Prag		Charles I
	Anna of Bavaria (Anna Falcká)	Rudolf II, Duke of Bavaria	26 Sep 1329	4 (11) Mar 1349 in Bacharach am Rhein (Germany)		2 Feb 1353		Charles I
	Anna of Świdnica (Anna Svídnická)	Henry II, Duke of Świdnica	1339	27 May 1353 in Buda (today Budapest, Hungary)		11 Jul 1362		Charles I
	Elizabeth of Pomerania (Alžběta Pomořanská)	Bogislaw V, Duke of Pomerania	1347	21 May 1363 in the Royal Castle in Wawel in Kraków (Poland)		29 Nov 1378	14 Feb 1393 evident in Castle in Hradec Králové (alias Königgrätz, Czech Republic)	Charles I
	Joanna of Bavaria (Johanna (alias Jana) Bavorská)	Albert I, Duke of Bavaria	circa 1356	29 Sep 1370 in Nuremberg (alias Nürnberg, Germany)	10 Jun 1376	31 Dec 1386 in Karlštejn Castle (alias Karlstein Castle, Czech Republic)		Wenceslaus IV King of Bohemia
	Sofia of Bavaria (Žofie Bavorská)	John II, Duke of Bavaria	1376	2 May 1389		16 Aug 1419	26 Sep 1425 in Bratislava, (original Pozsony alias Pressburg, today Slovakia)	Wenceslaus IV King of Bohemia
	Barbara of Celje (Barbora Cellská)	Hermann II, Count of Celje	circa 1393	1408	16 Aug 1419	9 Dec 1437	11 Jul 1451 in Mělník Castle (Czech Republic)	Sigismund

== Non-dynastic ==
Picture	Name	Father	Birth	Marriage	Became Queen	Ceased to be Queen	Death	Spouse
	Elizabeth of Luxembourg (Alžběta Lucemburská)	Sigismund, Holy Roman Emperor	1409	1422	1438 husband's coronation	27 Oct 1439 husband's death	25 Dec 1442	Albert II of Germany (Albrecht Habsburský)
	Joanna of Rožmitál (Johana z Rožmitálu)	John of Rosental	c. 1430	1450	7 May 1457 husband's election	22 Mar 1471	12 Nov 1475	George of Podebrady

=== House of Jagiellon, 1490–1526 ===
Picture	Name	Father	Birth	Marriage	Became Queen	Ceased to be Queen	Death	Spouse
	Barbara of Brandenburg	Albert III, Elector of Brandenburg (Hohenzollern)	30 May 1464	20 August 1476		1491 divorce	4 September 1515	Vladislaus II
	Beatrice of Naples	Ferdinand I of Naples (Trastámara)	16 November 1457	4 October 1490		7 April 1500 marriage annulled by Pope Alexander VI	23 September 1508	Vladislaus II
	Anna of Foix-Candale	Gaston de Foix, Count of Candale (Foix)	1484	29 September 1502		26 July 1506		Vladislaus II
	Maria of Austria	Philip I of Castile (Habsburg)	18 September 1505	13 January 1522		29 August 1526 husband's death	18 October 1558	Louis II

== House of Habsburg ==
Picture	Name	Father	Birth	Marriage	Became Queen	Ceased to be Queen	Death	Spouse
	Anna of Bohemia and Hungary (Anna Jagellonská)	Vladislaus II	23 July 1503	25 May 1521	1526 husband's election	27 January 1547		Ferdinand I
	Maria of Spain (Marie Španělská)	Charles V, Holy Roman Emperor	21 June 1528	13 September 1548	25 July 1564 husband's ascension	12 October 1576 husband's death	26 February 1603	Maximilian
	Anna of Austria (Anna Tyrolská)	Ferdinand II, Archduke of Austria	4 October 1585	4 December 1611		14 December 1618		Matthias

== House of Wittelsbach ==
Picture	Name	Father	Birth	Marriage	Became Queen	Ceased to be Queen	Death	Spouse
	Elizabeth Stuart of England, Scotland and Ireland (Alžběta Stuartovna)	James VI and I of Scotland, England and Ireland	19 August 1596	14 February 1613	26 August 1619 husband's election	9 November 1620 flight from Bohemia	13 February 1662	Frederick V of the Palatinate

== House of Habsburg ==
Picture	Name	Father	Birth	Marriage	Became Queen	Ceased to be Queen	Death	Spouse
	Eleonore of Mantua (Eleonora Mantovská)	Vincenzo I Gonzaga	23 September (23 February?) 1598	4 February 1622		15 February 1637 husband's death	27 June 1655	Ferdinand II
	Maria Anna of Spain (Marie Anna Španělská)	Philip III of Spain	18 August 1606	20 February 1631		13 May 1646		Ferdinand III
	Maria Leopoldine of Austria (Marie Leopoldina Tyrolská)	Leopold V, Archduke of Austria	6 April 1632	2 July 1648		7 August 1649		Ferdinand III
	Eleanor of Mantua (Eleonora Mantovská)	Charles II Gonzaga of Mantua	18 November 1630	30 April 1651		2 April 1657 husband's death	6 December 1686	Ferdinand III
	Margaret Theresa of Spain (Markéta Tereza Habsburská)	Philip IV of Spain	12 July 1651	12 December 1666		12 March 1673		Leopold I
	Claudia Felicitas of Austria (Klaudie Felicitas Tyrolská)	Archduke Ferdinand Charles of Austria	30 May 1653	15 October 1673		8 April 1676		Leopold I
	Eleonore-Magdalena of Neuburg (Eleonora Magdalena Falcko-Neuburská)	Philip William, Elector Palatine	6 January 1655	14 December 1676		5 May 1705 husband's death	19 January 1720	Leopold I
	Wilhelmina Amalia of Brunswick (Amálie Vilemína Brunšvická)	John Frederick, Duke of Brunswick-Lüneburg	21 April 1673	24 February 1699	5 May 1705 husband's ascension	17 April 1711 husband's death	10 April 1742	Joseph I
	Elisabeth Christine of Brunswick-Wolfenbüttel (Alžběta Kristýna Brunšvická)	Louis Rudolph, Duke of Brunswick-Lüneburg	28 August (28 September?) 1691	1 August 1708	17 April 1711 husband's ascension	20 October 1740 husband's death	21 December 1750	Charles II

== House of Wittelsbach ==
Picture	Name	Father	Birth	Marriage	Became Queen	Ceased to be Queen	Death	Spouse
	Maria Amalia of Austria (Marie Amálie Habsburská)	Emperor Joseph I	22 October 1701	5 October 1722	9 December 1741 coronation	12 May 1743 husband's deposition	11 December 1756	Charles Albert

== House of Habsburg-Lorraine ==
Picture	Name	Father	Birth	Marriage	Became Queen	Ceased to be Queen	Death	Spouse
	Maria Luisa of Spain	Charles III of Spain	24 November 1745	16 February 1764	20 February 1790	1 March 1792	15 May 1792	Leopold II
	Maria Teresa of the Two Sicilies	Ferdinand I of the Two Sicilies	6 June 1772	15 August 1790	1 March 1792	13 April 1807		Francis II
	Maria Ludovika of Austria-Este	Archduke Ferdinand of Austria-Este	14 December 1787	6 January 1808		7 April 1816		Francis II
	Caroline Augusta of Bavaria	Maximilian I Joseph of Bavaria	8 February 1792	29 October 1816		2 March 1835 husband's death	9 February 1873	Francis II
	Maria Anna of Sardinia	Victor Emmanuel I of Sardinia	19 September 1803	12 February ? 1831	2 March 1835 husband's ascension	2 December 1848 husband's abdication	4 May 1884	Ferdinand V
	Elisabeth of Bavaria	Maximilian Joseph, Duke in Bavaria	24 December 1837	24 April 1854		10 September 1898		Francis Joseph I
	Zita of Bourbon-Parma	Robert I, Duke of Parma	9 May 1892	21 October 1911	21 November 1916 husband's ascension	11 November 1918 husband's deposition	14 March 1989	Charles III

== See also ==
- List of the Czechoslovak and Czech First Ladies
