= Elizabeth Richeza of Poland =

Queen of Bohemia and Poland (1288–1335)

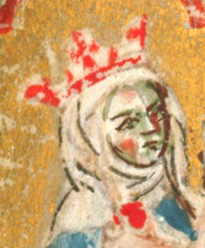
- Ryksa in 1317

Queen consort of Bohemia
- Tenure: 1303–1305 (1st time); 1306–1307 (2nd time)
- Coronation: 26 May 1303

Queen consort of Poland
- Tenure: 1303–1305
- Coronation: 26 May 1303

Duchess consort of Austria and Styria
- Tenure: 1306–1307
- Born: 1 September 1288; Poznań, Greater Poland
- Died: 19 October 1335 (aged 47); Brno, Moravia
- Burial: Church of the Assumption of Virgin Mary, Brno
- Spouses: Wenceslaus II of Bohemia (m. 1303; died 1305) Rudolph III of Habsburg (m. 1306; died 1307)
- Issue: Agnes of Bohemia, Duchess of Jawor
- House: Piast
- Father: Przemysł II of Poland
- Mother: Richeza of Sweden

Elizabeth Richeza of Poland (Czech: Eliška-Rejčka; Polish: Ryksa Elżbieta; 1 September 1288 – 19 October 1335), was a Polish princess member of the House of Piast and by her two marriages Queen consort of Bohemia and Poland and Duchess consort of Austria and Styria. She was the only child of Przemysł II, Duke of Greater Poland (since 1295 King of Poland) and his second wife Richeza, herself a daughter of the former King Valdemar of Sweden and Sofia of Denmark.

== Life ==
=== Early years ===
Born in Poznań, Ryksa was the only child born from her parents' marriage. She was born on September 1, 1288; she is the first known female Polish to have her birthdate recorded. Ryksa was named after her mother, who died between the birth of his daughter and 19 April 1293, when Przemysł expressed a wish to have a memorial candle continuously lighted on his second wife's tomb.

During her first years of life, she was raised by her paternal aunt Anna of Greater Poland in the Cistercian monastery in Owińska, where she was the abbess. It was probably there that Ryksa received the news of her father's failed kidnapping and murder on 8 February 1296 in Rogoźno. The death of the Polish King completely changed the geopolitical situation in this part of Europe, and also clearly influenced the fate of the now orphaned young princess, who was now placed under the care of her stepmother Margaret of Brandenburg, member of the House of Ascania.

During the marriage ceremony of Przemysł II and Margaret (bef. 13 April 1293), Ryksa was betrothed to Otto of Brandenburg-Salzwedel (Margaret's brother), so her stepmother was also her future sister-in-law. Although Margaret received parts of Greater Poland as her dower, shortly after her husband's death, and for unknown reasons, she returned to Brandenburg, taking Ryksa with her. Otto's unexpected death on 11 March 1299 ended the betrothal. Despite this, Ryksa remained for next few years with her stepmother's family.

=== Engagement and marriage with Wenceslaus II ===
The death of Otto of Brandenburg complicated again Ryksa's situation, because as the only child of the last male member of the Piast Greater Poland line and the first King in almost two centuries, she was the perfect match for every contender to the Polish crown. King Wenceslaus II of Bohemia (a widower since 1297) received from the lords of Greater Poland the offer of marriage with the princess and before his coronation as King of Poland on 25 July 1300 in Gniezno, Ryksa was sent to Prague.

Because of her youth, Wenceslaus II decided to delay the wedding until Ryksa was fifteen years old. He had previously been married to Judith of Habsburg and had four surviving children (Wenceslaus III of Bohemia, Anna of Bohemia, Elisabeth of Bohemia and Margaret of Bohemia). During this time, Ryksa was placed under the care of Gryfina of Halych, widow of Leszek II the Black and aunt of the Bohemian King.

The marriage between Ryksa and Wenceslaus II took place on 26 May 1303 in Prague Cathedral. During the ceremony, Ryksa was crowned Queen consort of Bohemia and Poland, and at the request of her husband, she adopted the name Elisabeth, because her name was not used in Bohemia and seen as strange. The ceremony was performed with the consent of the Archbishops of Mainz and Gniezno and the Bishop of Wrocław, Henryk z Wierzbnej.

Two years later, on 15 June 1305, Queen Elizabeth gave birth to her only known child, a daughter named Agnes of Bohemia. Only six days later, on 21 June 1305, King Wenceslaus II died in Prague, probably of tuberculosis. The seventeen-year-old Elizabeth, now Queen Dowager, received a pension and 20,000 talents of fine silver and the royal towns in East Bohemia of Hradec Králové, Vysoké Mýto, Chrudim, Polička and Jaroměř.

=== Short government of Wenceslaus III and marriage with Rudolph of Habsburg ===
Elizabeth's stepson Wenceslaus III (also a claimant to the throne of Hungary) succeeded to the thrones of both Bohemia and Poland but was murdered on 4 August 1306 in Olomouc, and with him the Přemyslid dynasty became extinct. The Kujavian branch of the Piast dynasty ascended to the Polish throne.

With the death of her stepson, the position of Elizabeth again changed considerably, because as Queen Dowager, she was involved in the fight for the vacant Bohemian throne. Duke Rudolph III of Austria and Styria, son of King Albert I of Germany, finally could take the crown thanks to his father's help. In order to strengthen his position, he arranged his marriage to Elizabeth, both widow and stepmother of the last two Premyslid Kings. The marriage took place in Prague on 16 October 1306.

Elizabeth's second time as Queen consort was short-lived. King Rudolph died on 4 July 1307 of dysentery after becoming ill during the siege of the fortress of a nobleman in revolt. In his will, Rudolph acknowledged Elizabeth's dowry towns and left her an additional 20,000 pieces of fine silver. She commissioned an altar to Simon and Jude sometime before 1319 to aid her husband's soul.

According to a chronicle by an anonymous Austrian author from Leoben, Elizabeth was pregnant by Rudolph at the time of his death, and she afterward gave birth to a posthumous son. His fate is not mentioned in the source, but historians assume that he died young if he indeed existed.

=== Rule over Hradec Králové ===
After her second husband's death, Elizabeth left Prague and settled in Hradec Králové, one of her dower towns, which became the center of her domains as her widow seat. However, soon after, she was again involved in the civil war for the Bohemian crown, this time between Henry of Carinthia and Frederick I of Austria, Rudolph's brother. In the fight, Elizabeth strongly supported her brother-in-law; for this, she was forced to flee from her lands, which were occupied by Henry. It was only in August 1308 when the Dowager Queen was able to return to Hradec Králové, which she transformed into a centre of culture and art with the income from her dowry towns. She also supported the Inquisition in a campaign against local Waldensians.

=== Relationship with Henry of Lipá and conflicts with John of Luxembourg ===
In 1310 John of Luxembourg became the new King of Bohemia, thanks to his marriage to Elizabeth of Bohemia, daughter of King Wenceslaus II and his first wife. John's rule faced substantial opposition from Bohemian nobles, who decided to support Elizabeth Richeza. One of the main reasons for Elizabeth Richeza's opposition was her wounded pride, for now she was degraded in status because of the new Queen consort, her own stepdaughter. The second important leader of the anti-Luxembourg faction was the powerful nobleman Jindřich of Lipá (Henry of Lipá), who was the Moravian Hetman and Governor of the Bohemian Kingdom in the absence of the King.

Soon a romantic relationship developed between Elizabeth Richeza and Henry of Lipá, which never led to marriage as Henry already had a wife. In order to weaken the position of the powerful nobility, in 1315, King John deprived Henry of all his offices and imprisoned him. However, the position and popularity of the Dowager Queen was so strong in Bohemia that John, fearing a civil war, released him in April 1316.

=== Alliance with Henry I of Jawor, peace with King John of Bohemia and sale of Hradec Králové ===
Despite her conciliatory gestures toward King John, Elizabeth Richeza continued to dictate her own independent policies, as was evidenced in 1317, when she arranged the betrothal of her only daughter, Agnes, to the Piast Silesian Duke Henry I of Jawor, who in order to secure his future mother-in-law's patrimony and with her consent, entered Hradec Králové with his army and began expeditions and raids in support of rebels against King John.

However, one year later, and thanks to the mediation of Emperor Louis IV (Henry I's brother-in-law) a peace treaty was signed in Domažlice, which restored Henry of Lipá in King John's favor and regained for him all of his previous offices. In addition, the Dowager Queen sold her dowry towns to King John and settled with her lover in Brno. Between 1316 and 1323, Elizabeth Richeza commissioned eight illuminated manuscripts and, in 1323, the couple founded the Cistercian convent of St. Mary by securing the endowment of the community.

Afterward, the relations between the Bohemia King John and Elizabeth Richeza were peaceful, to the point that a certain weakness could be interpreted by King John's actions, made evident in his approval of grants to the Cistercian convent in Moravia in response to the request of the Dowager Queen. The formal marriage between Agnes and Henry I of Jawor took place in 1319; after a miscarriage some time later, the couple remained childless.

=== Death of Henry of Lipá and last years ===
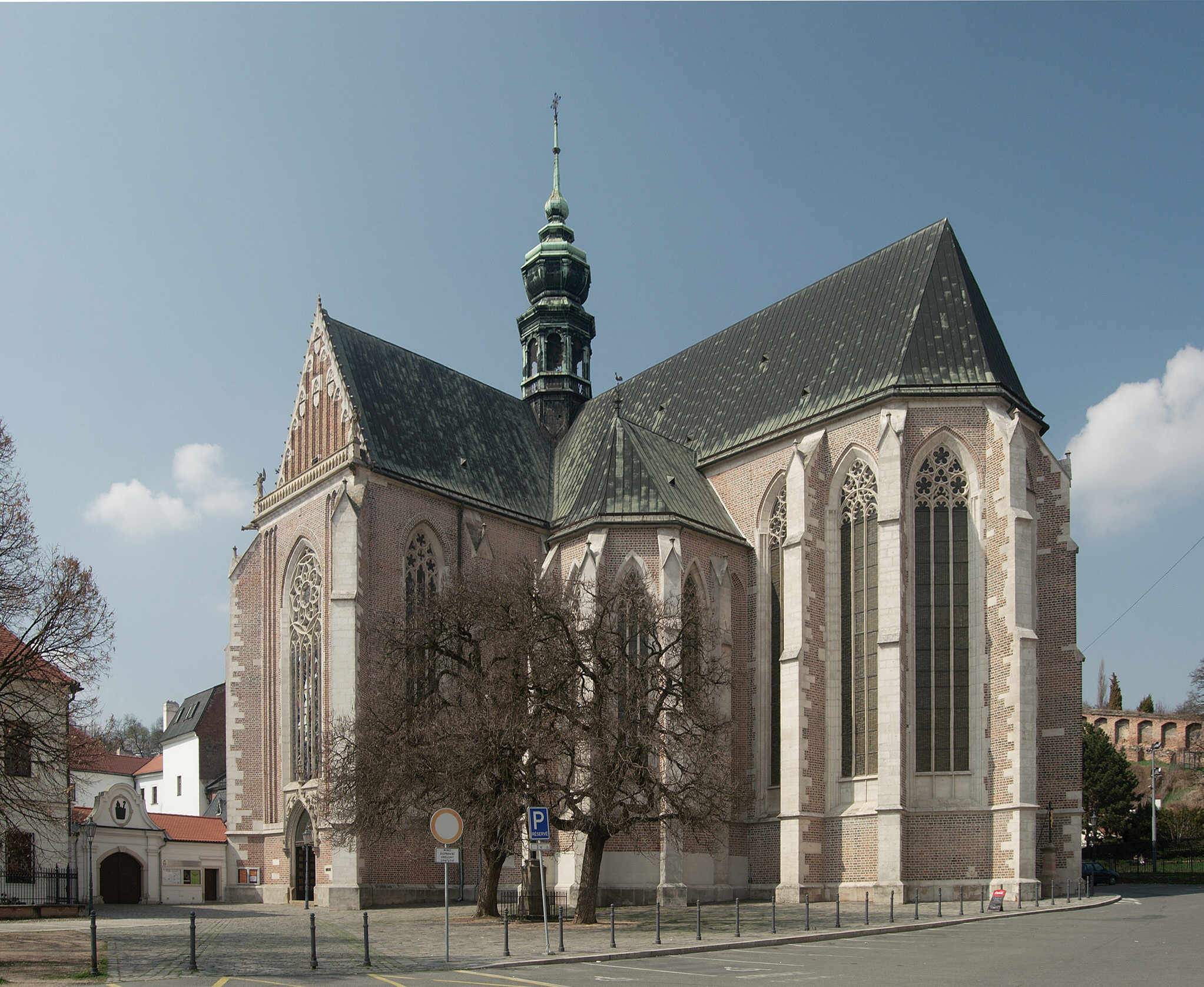
Burial place of Elizabeth Richeza, basilika in Old Brno

Henry of Lipá died in Brno on 26 August 1329. After his loss, Elizabeth Richeza moved into the local convent that was under her patronage; she did not, however, become a nun herself. The Dowager Queen turned her attention to culture and religion, building churches and Cistercian convents, and financing the crafting of illuminated hymn books. Four years later, and together with her daughter Agnes, she went on a long pilgrimage to the shrines of the Rhine, returning a few months later.

Elizabeth Richeza, Dowager Queen of Poland and Bohemia (known in Bohemian literature as a "beautiful Polish girl"), died on 19 October 1335 in the Cistercian monastery at Brno which she had founded. According to her wishes she was buried under the floor of her cloister church, Basilica of the Assumption of Our Lady, Brno, next to her beloved Henry of Lipá. In her will she made several donations to ecclesiastical institutions in both Bohemia and Poland (especially in Poznań, her birthplace).

Elizabeth Richeza of Poland Piast dynasty Born: 1 September 1286 Died: 18 October 1335
Royal titles
Preceded by Judith of Habsburg	Queen consort of Bohemia; 1303–1305	Succeeded by Viola of Teschen
Preceded by Margaret of Brandenburg	Queen consort of Poland; 1303–1305	Succeeded by Viola of Teschen
Preceded by Viola of Teschen	Queen consort of Bohemia; 1306–1307	Succeeded by Anne of Bohemia
