= Judith of Habsburg =

Queen of Bohemia from 1285 to 1297

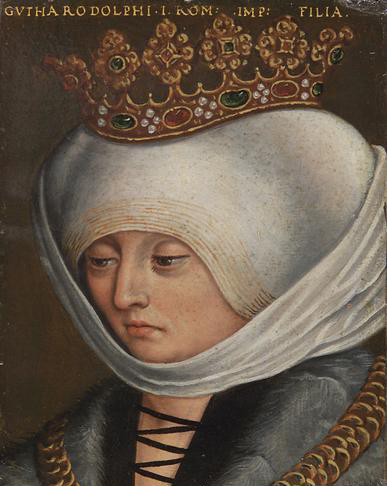

Queen consort of Bohemia
- Tenure: 1285–1297
- Coronation: 2 June 1297, Prague

Queen consort of Poland
- Tenure: 1296–1297
- Born: 13 March 1271; Rheinfelden, Swabia
- Died: 18 June 1297 (aged 26); Prague, Bohemia
- Burial: Royal Crypt in St. Vitus Cathedral, Prague
- Spouse: Wenceslaus II of Bohemia (m. 1285)
- Issue: Wenceslaus III of Bohemia; Anne, Queen of Bohemia; Elisabeth, Queen of Bohemia; Margaret, Duchess of Brieg
- House: Habsburg
- Father: Rudolf I of Germany
- Mother: Gertrude of Hohenberg

Judith of Habsburg (German: Guta; 13 March 1271 – 21 May 1297) was queen of Bohemia and Poland from 1285 until her death as the wife of the Přemyslid king Wenceslaus II.

== Early life ==
Judith was the youngest daughter of King Rudolf I of Germany and Gertrude of Hohenberg. She was born in the Swabian town of Rheinfelden, where her father still resided as a count before he was elected king of Germany in 1273. When she was five, she became the object of her father's political plans: on 21 October 1276 King Rudolf accepted the homage of his bitter rival King Ottokar II of Bohemia in the Austrian capital Vienna, and to seal the peace, both decided that Judith should marry Ottokar's son Wenceslaus. The agreement, however, did not last and the conflict erupted again, ending with King Ottokar's final defeat and death in the 1278 Battle on the Marchfeld.

After King Ottokar's death, the Brandenburg margrave Otto V had guardianship over minor King Wenceslaus II, acting as Bohemian regent. After conflicts arose with Ottokar's widow Kunigunda of Halych, Margrave Otto temporarily held Wenceslaus as a prisoner at Bezděz Castle and in the Ascanian fortress of Spandau in Brandenburg. He did not return to Prague until 1283. As part of a reconciliation process, the formal engagement between Judith and Wenceslaus was renewed in 1279 at Jihlava; nevertheless, the bridal couple did not meet until in January 1285 a wedding ceremony was held by the Přemyslid and Habsburg dynasties in the City of Cheb (Eger). The bride was given a dowry stretching "from the Duchy of Austria, Moravian border to the border of Danube". The ceremony in Cheb was followed by a "festive" wedding night, but soon after, King Rudolf took Judith back to Germany, since she was still of a young age. Moreover, the remarriage of Wenceslaus' mother Kunigunda to the Bohemian noble Záviš of Falkenstein appeared unacceptable to the king.

== Queenship ==
Though Kunigunda died later in that year and Wenceslaus II had sworn an oath of fealty to Rudolf in order to receive his Bohemian heritage, his coronation as king of Bohemia had to be postponed as Judith was not present. In Summer 1287, she did eventually leave her family in Germany and came to the Prague court to be with her husband. One year later, Wenceslaus took over the political power. Like King Rudolf, Judith hated Wenceslaus' stepfather Záviš of Falkenstein, who had acted as regent with Kunigunda. Judith urged Wenceslaus to bring Zavis to trial and he was eventually arrested and executed at Hluboká Castle in 1290.

Upon her father's death in 1291, Judith further tried to reconcile her husband with her brother Albert, who struggled for the German throne with Count Adolf of Nassau.

Judith and Wenceslaus were finally crowned on 2 June 1297. Judith was not in good health at the time, having just given birth to her tenth child, which was stillborn. She died a few weeks after the coronation in Prague, at age twenty-six. She had been pregnant during much of her twelve years of marriage, giving birth almost once per year.

According to the family chronicles, Judith was described as beautiful, noble and virtuous. She supported her husband's claim on the Kingdom of Poland, where he ruled over the Seniorate Province at Kraków since 1291 and was able to succeed King Przemysł II in 1296.

== Issue ==
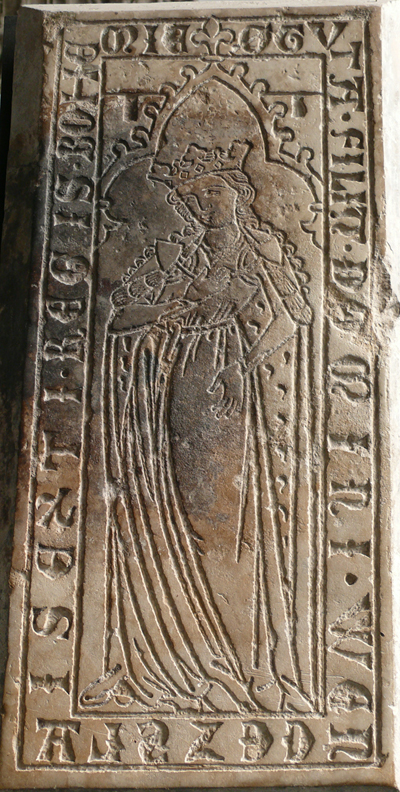
Judith's epitaph in the Convent of Saint Agnes of Bohemia in Prague

Wenceslaus II and Judith had ten children:

1. Přemysl Otakar (6 May 1288 – 19 November 1288).
2. Wenceslaus III (6 October 1289 – 4 August 1306); King of Bohemia, King of Hungary and King of Poland.
3. Agnes (6 October 1289 – between 1292 and 1306), twin of Wenceslaus III, betrothed to Rupert of Nassau, son of King Adolf of Germany, but died young.
4. Anna (10 October 1290 – 3 September 1313), married in 1306 to Duke Henry of Carinthia.
5. Elizabeth (20 January 1292 – 28 September 1330), married in 1310 to John I of Bohemia.
6. Judith (3 March 1293 – 3 August 1294).
7. John (26 February 1294 – 1 March 1295).
8. John (21 February 1295 – 6 December 1296).
9. Margareta (21 February 1296 – 8 April 1322), married to Bolesław III the Generous, Duke of Wrocław.
10. Judith (born and died 21 May 1297).

Of the ten children only four lived to adulthood.

== Family legacy ==
Wenceslaus III and then Anna and Elisabeth succeeded their father as rulers of Bohemia. Elisabeth was the mother of Charles IV, Holy Roman Emperor, his son was Sigismund, Holy Roman Emperor.

Judith is also an ancestor of Anne of Denmark, who married James I of England. Among Anne's children were Charles I of England and Elizabeth of Bohemia; Elizabeth is one of Judith's successors as Queen of Bohemia.

== Sources ==
- Earenfight, Theresa (2013). Queenship in Medieval Europe. Palgrave Macmillan.
- Patrouch, Joseph F. (2013). "Bella gerant alii" Laodamia's Sisters, Habsburg Brides: Leaving Home for the Sake of the House". In Cruz, Anne J.; Stampino, Maria Galli (eds.). Early Modern Habsburg Women: Transnational Contexts, Cultural Conflicts, Dynastic Continuities. Routledge.

Judith of Habsburg House of Habsburg Born: 13 March 1271 Died: 21 May 1297
Royal titles
Preceded by Kunigunda of Slavonia	Queen consort of Bohemia; 1285–1297	Succeeded by Elisabeth Richeza of Poland
Preceded by Margaret of Brandenburg	Queen consort of Poland; 1296–1297	Succeeded by Elisabeth Richeza of Poland
