= Kunigunda of Halych =

Queen consort of Bohemia from 1261 to 1278

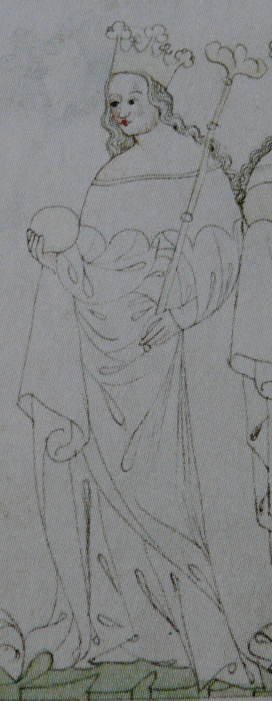

Queen consort of Bohemia
- Tenure: 1261 – 1278
- Coronation: 1261
- Born: c. 1245 ?
- Died: 9 September 1285 (aged 39–40); Prague
- Burial: Prague
- Spouses: Ottokar II of Bohemia (m. 1261; died 1278) Záviš of Falkenstein (m. 1280/1285)
- Issue Detail: Wenceslaus II of Bohemia; Kunigunde of Bohemia; Agnes of Bohemia, Duchess of Austria; John of Falkenstein
- Dynasty: Rurik
- Father: Rostislav Mikhailovich
- Mother: Anna of Hungary

Kunigunda of Halych (c. 1245 – 9 September 1285; Czech: Kunhuta Uherská or Kunhuta Haličská) was Queen consort of Bohemia. She was a member of the House of Chernigov and a daughter of Rostislav Mikhailovich.

== Family ==
She was presumably born in Ruthenia, in the domains of her paternal grandfather Michael of Chernigov. Her grandfather was the last Grand Prince of Kiev, who was deposed not by a more powerful prince but by the Mongol Empire. Her parents were Rostislav Mikhailovich, future ruler of Belgrade and Slavonia, and his wife Anna of Hungary. After the death of her father's father, Kunigunda's family relocated to Hungary, where her mother's father, Béla IV of Hungary, made her father governor of certain Serbian-speaking regions in the Danube Valley. Her father proclaimed himself Emperor of Bulgaria in 1256 but did not stay there to defend his title.

== First marriage ==
Kunigunda was married – as a token of alliance from her maternal grandfather Béla – to King Ottokar II of Bohemia (ca. 1233 – 1278) in Pressburg (now Bratislava) on 25 October 1261. Ottokar was paternally a member of the Přemyslid dynasty whose marriage to Margaret, Duchess of Austria (ca. 1204 – 1266) was annulled.

Kunigunda, 41 years Margaret's junior, bore Ottokar three children who survived to adulthood:

- Kunigunde of Bohemia (January, 1265 – 27 November 1321). Married Boleslaus II of Masovia;
- Agnes of Bohemia, Duchess of Austria (5 September 1269 – 17 May 1296). Married Rudolf II, Duke of Austria;
- Wenceslaus II of Bohemia (17 September 1271 – 21 June 1305).

Additionally, the royal couple had three other children, who died young:

- Margaret;
- Two sons of unknown names.

== Dowager Queen ==
However, the peace between Bohemia and Hungary ended after 10 years, when Kunigunda's uncle Stephen came to power as the King of Hungary.

In 1278, King Ottokar tried to recover his lands lost to Rudolph I of Germany in 1276. He made allies and collected a large army, but he was defeated by Rudolph and killed at the Battle of Dürnkrut and Jedenspeigen on the Morava on 26 August 1278.

Moravia was subdued and its government entrusted to Rudolph's representatives, leaving Kunigunda in control of her castle in Hradec nad Moravicí, while Otto V, Margrave of Brandenburg-Salzwedel became regent of Bohemia and the young Wenceslaus was betrothed and married to one of Rudolph's daughters, Judith.

Kunigunda then entered into a romantic relationship with Bohemian magnate Záviš of Falkenstein. They had one child:

- John (1281/1282 – after 1337), member of Teutonic Order

Kunigunda and Záviš married at some point; however, the year is unclear, and it's unknown if that happened before or after the couple had their son. Nevertheless, Záviš managed to obtain Weneclaus's approval of marriage at the latest in 1285, before his lover/wife died.

Záviš survived her and married again to the Hungarian Princess Elisabeth. He was executed on behalf of the King on 24 August 1290.

Kunigunda's son Wenceslaus II kept the Kingdom of Bohemia, and also succeeded in obtaining Poland and Hungary. Ultimately, she is one of the pivotal ancestresses of both the House of Luxembourg and the Habsburgs.

== Literature ==
- Kateřina Charvátová (2007). Václav II.: král český a polský. ISBN 978-80-7021-841-9.
- Gabriela V. Šarochová (2004). Radostný úděl vdovský: královny-vdovy přemyslovských Čech. ISBN 80-86569-24-1.
- Duczmal, Małgorzata (2010). Ryksa Piastówna. Królowa Czech i Polski (1st ed.). Wydawnictwo Manuskrypt. ISBN 83-923110-1-9.

Kunigunda of Halych Olgovichi Born: 1245 Died: 9 September 1285
Royal titles
Vacant Title last held by Margaret of Austria	Queen consort of Bohemia; 1261–1278	Vacant Title next held by Judith of Habsburg
