= Richeza of Sweden, Duchess of Poland =

Richeza of Sweden

Duchess consort of Greater Poland
- Tenure: 1285–1292?

High Duchess consort of Poland
- Tenure: 1290–1292?
- Born: c. 1270
- Died: c. 1292 (aged 21–22)
- Burial: Archcathedral Basilica of St. Peter and St. Paul, Poznań
- Spouse: Przemysł II
- Issue: Richeza-Elisabeth, Queen of Bohemia and Poland
- House: Bjälbo
- Father: Valdemar of Sweden
- Mother: Sofia of Denmark

Richeza of Sweden (Swedish: Rikissa Valdemarsdotter, Polish: Ryksa szwedzka, Ryksa Waldemarówna; between 1265 and 1270 – before 1292) was a Swedish princess member of the House of Bjälbo and by marriage Duchess of Greater Poland during 1285-1292 and High Duchess consort of Poland during 1290-1291.

She was a daughter of Valdemar, King of Sweden and Sophia of Denmark, daughter of the King Eric IV.

== Life ==
Her exact date of birth is unknown, but is generally placed as the third daughter and fifth child born of her parents' marriage (at all, they had seven children, two sons and five daughters). She was certainly born before 1273, because by that year she and her sister Katharina were considered for possible marriage with Otto, only son and heir of John, Duke of Brunswick-Lüneburg. However, the marriage negotiations ended without results.

In 1275, King Valdemar was deposed by his brother Magnus, and a year later his wife Sophia divorced him and returned to Denmark. Apparently, young Richeza and her siblings remained in Sweden probably under the care of their father. (Note: In 1277, ex-King Valdemar managed to regain provinces in Götaland in the southern part of the Sweden and was called the Duke of Götaland. However, King Magnus regained them about 1278.) Her marriage by proxy with Przemysł II, Duke of Greater Poland, took place in the Swedish city of Nyköping on 11 October 1285. In the same ceremony, Richeza's younger sister Marianne (or Marina), was married to a German nobleman, Count Rudolph II of Diepholz. Richeza's marriage, concluded through the mediation of the House of Ascania, rulers of Brandenburg, was performed without the consent of her father, ex-King Valdemar.

In the proxy marriage the Polish Duke was represented by the notary Tylon, one of his closest subjects. There is no information about when and where the formal marriage took place between Przemysł II and Richeza.

Traditionally, Richeza and Przemysł II's marriage is described as happy. Their only child was born on 1 September 1288 in the city of Poznań: a daughter, named Richeza, who later became in Queen consort of Bohemia and Poland as a wife of Wenceslaus II and after his death, of Rudolph III of Habsburg.

The news of the birth of her daughter was also the last information about Richeza. She certainly died between 1 September 1288 and before 13 April 1293, most likely between 1289-1292. The reports of Jan Długosz, who placed her next to her husband in his royal coronation on 26 June 1295, proved to be erroneous.

The deep and strong feelings of Przemysł II for Richeza are evidenced in two facts: firstly, he named their daughter after her, and secondly, he mentioned her in a document issued on 19 April 1293 where Przemysł II ceded to the Bishopric of Poznań the village of Kobylniki as payment for a lamp lit eternally at Richeza's tomb, and also expressed his desire to be buried next to her.

Richeza was buried in the Archcathedral Basilica of St. Peter and St. Paul in Poznań. After Przemysł II's murder in 1296 and following his wishes, he was buried next to her.

== Notes ==
Richeza of Sweden, Duchess of Poland House of Bjälbo Born: before 1273 Died: before 1292
Royal titles
Preceded by Matilda of Brandenburg	High Duchess consort of Poland; 1290–1292?	Succeeded by Judith of Habsburg
