= 1372 =

1372 in various calendars
- Gregorian calendar: 1372; MCCCLXXII
- Ab urbe condita: 2125
- Armenian calendar: 821; ԹՎ ՊԻԱ
- Assyrian calendar: 6122
- Balinese saka calendar: 1293–1294
- Bengali calendar: 778–779
- Berber calendar: 2322
- English Regnal year: 45 Edw. 3 – 46 Edw. 3
- Buddhist calendar: 1916
- Burmese calendar: 734
- Byzantine calendar: 6880–6881
- Chinese calendar: 辛亥年 (Metal Pig); 4069 or 3862 — to — 壬子年 (Water Rat); 4070 or 3863
- Coptic calendar: 1088–1089
- Discordian calendar: 2538
- Ethiopian calendar: 1364–1365
- Hebrew calendar: 5132–5133
- Hindu calendars
- Vikram Samvat: 1428–1429
- Shaka Samvat: 1293–1294
- Kali Yuga: 4472–4473
- Holocene calendar: 11372
- Igbo calendar: 372–373
- Iranian calendar: 750–751
- Islamic calendar: 773–774
- Japanese calendar: Ōan 5 (応安５年)
- Javanese calendar: 1285–1286
- Julian calendar: 1372; MCCCLXXII
- Korean calendar: 3705
- Minguo calendar: 540 before ROC 民前540年
- Nanakshahi calendar: −96
- Thai solar calendar: 1914–1915
- Tibetan calendar: ལྕགས་མོ་ཕག་ལོ་ (female Iron-Boar); 1498 or 1117 or 345 — to — ཆུ་ཕོ་བྱི་བ་ལོ་ (male Water-Rat); 1499 or 1118 or 346

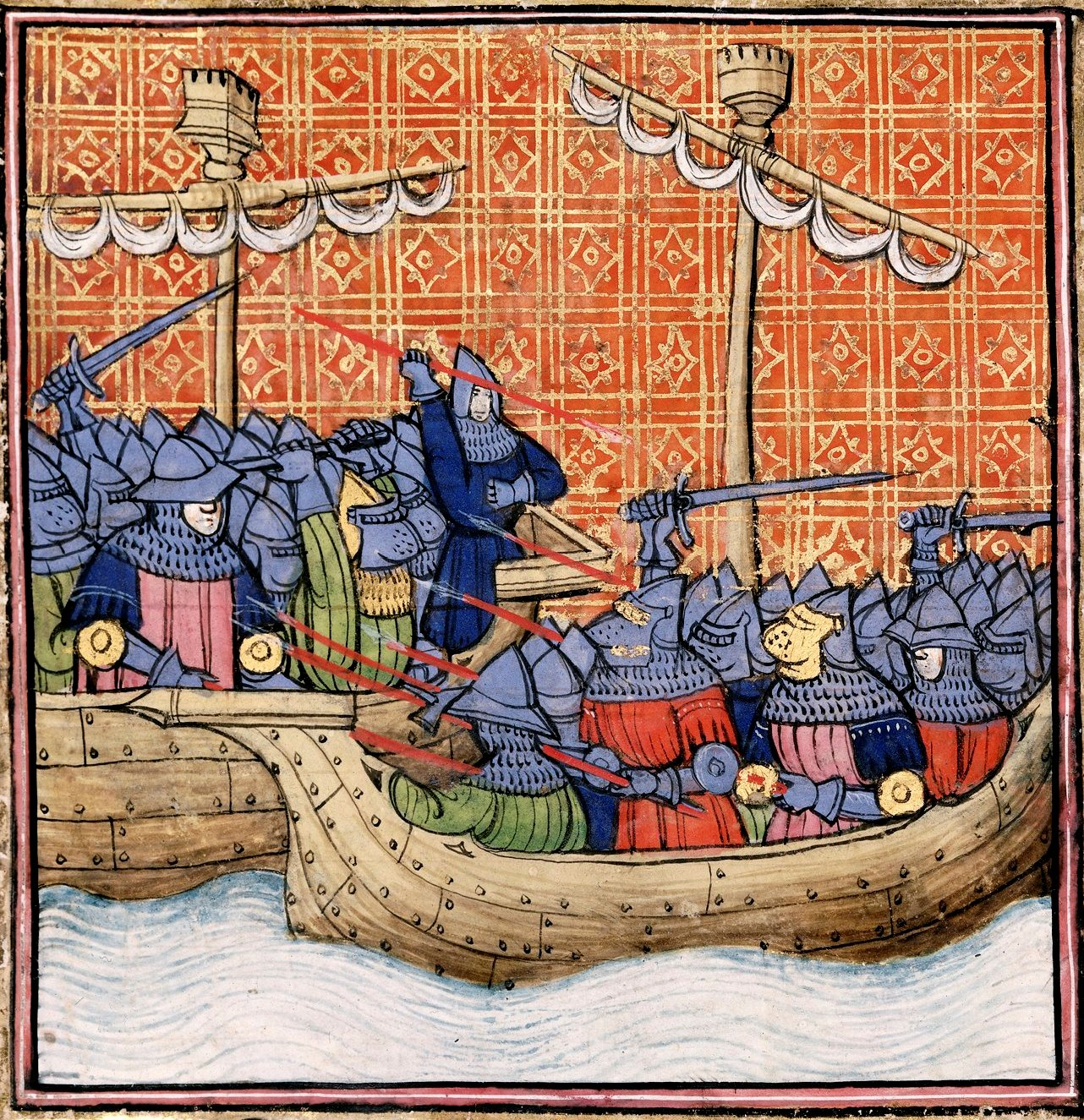
June 22: France regains control of the English Channel from England in the Battle of La Rochelle.

Year 1372 (MCCCLXXII) was a leap year starting on Thursday of the Julian calendar.

== Events ==
=== January–March ===
- January 6 – The coronation of Peter the Fat as King Peter II of Cyprus takes place in Nicosia at the Greek Orthodox Cathedral of Saint Sophia (now the Selimiye Mosque). Peter had become the ruler of Cyprus at age 14 upon the death of his father, King Peter I.
- January 17 – Frederick the Simple, King of Sicily, agrees to marry Antonia of Baux, as part of negotiations for a peace treaty between Sicily and the Kingdom of Naples and Neapolitan and Papal recognition of his right to the throne. The marriage will take place the next year on November 26, 1373.
- January 29 – John of Gaunt, Duke of Lancaster and the third son of England's King Edward III, begins a claim to the throne of Spain's Crown of Castile after his September 21 marriage to Princess Constance of Castile. King Pedro of Castile, who was killed by his brother, who took control as King Enrique II, in 1369.
- February 21 – Jean, County of Montfort, Duke of Brittany makes a secret agreement with the Kingdom of England to allow English troops to pass through the lands he owns during the English war with France, event though he had previously allied with King Charles V of France in the same war.
- March 8 – In the Holy Roman Empire, the Archbishop-Elector of Trier, Kuno II von Falkenstein and the Archbishop-Elector of Köln, Friedrich III. von Saarwerden, become co-founders of their own mint abd begin production of being the minting of coins, including the "Weisspfennig" (the "white penny").
- March 12 – Saint Bridget sets out on a pilgrimage to the Holy Land, staying in Cyprus until May 12. In August, she is in Bethlehem where she sees a vision of Jesus' birth. In September, she sets sail for Naples, where she arrives in December.
- March 14 – Charles IV, Holy Roman Emperor, signs a deed in Wrocław, acknowledging the sovereignty of King Louis I of Hungary as ruler of Hungary, Croatia and Poland.

=== April–June ===
- April 8 – King Robert II of Scotland issues a Royal Charter granting royal burgh status to the town of Irvine, North Ayrshire, a status that lasts for 603 years until royal burghs are abolished in 1975.
- April 13 – Saint Bridget and her fellow pilgrims arrive at Famagusta in Cyprus, after their ship has survived a five-day storm that they had encountered after departing from Asia Minor.
- May 10 – Owain Lawgoch makes a second attempt to take the throne of Wales, sailing with French support from Harfleur, and issues a declaration of war against England for "having treacherously and covetously... slain my ancestors, kings of Wales," as well as having "by force and power appropriated" the country and submitted its people to divers services, the which country is, and should be, mine by right of succession, by kindred, by heritage, and by right of descent from my ancestors the kings of that country." After attacking the island of Guernsey, Lawgoch will abandon the invasion in order to fight for France at La Rochelle.
- May 13 – St. Bridget and her fellow pilgrims finally arrive at Jerusalem on Ascension Day after a two-month journey.
- June 22 – The Kingdom of France and the Crown of Castile defeat the Kingdom of England in the Battle of La Rochelle, and France gains control of the English Channel for the first time since 1340.

=== July–September ===
- July 10 – The Treaty of Tagilde is signed between Ferdinand I of Portugal and representatives of John of Gaunt of England, marking the beginning of the Anglo-Portuguese Alliance, which remains in effect into the 21st century.
- August 20 – Peace is declared between the Kingdom of Sicily and the Kingdom of Naples with the signing of the Treaty of Villeneuve between Joanna of Anjou (ruler of Naples) and King Frederick IV of Aragon (ruler of Sicily).
- September 15 – Jayasthiti Malla becomes the new King of Nepal when he overthrows King Jayarjunadeva, who had ruled since 1360.

=== October–December ===
- October 10 – King Peter II of Cyprus is crowned as King of Jerusalem at a ceremony in Famagusta, although the Christian kingdom in Jerusalem had been dissolved 80 years earlier after the "Holy Land" fell to Muslim control in 1291. Although leaders of the Genoese and Venetian communities at Famagusta appear together at symbolic ceremonies to hold the two reins of the King's horse, an argument over which leader would hold the rein on the right and who would hold the remaining rein on the left leads to a fight between the two communities after the Venetian leader is allowed to hold the rein on the right. With the Venetian winning the privilege, the Republic of Genoa organizes an expedition to invade and conquer Cyprus.
- October 24 – (22 Rabi’ al-Thani 774 AH) ; Four-year-old Muhammad III ibn Abd al-Aziz succeeds his father, Abu Faris Abd al-Aziz I, as Marinid Sultan of Morocco.
- November 9 – Trần Duệ Tông succeeds his brother Trần Nghệ Tông as King of Vietnam.
- December 2 – Ruprecht and his brothers Waclaw, Boleslaw and Henryk sign an agreement that they will not divide the Duchy of Legnica (in Poland) for at least 10 years, having jointly inherited from their father, Waclaw the First.
- December 30 – ( 4th waxing of Pyatho, 734 ME. A major earthquake strikes what is now Myanmar during the reign of King Swa Saw Ke over the Kingdom of Ava.

=== Date unknown ===
- Encounter of Sintra: Twenty Portuguese knights rout four hundred Castilian infantrymen of the country.
- The Kingdom of Chūzan, ruled by King Satto on the island of Okinawa, in Japan) enters tributary relations with Ming dynasty China by way of an envoy, Yang Zai, sent by the Emperor Zhu Yuanzhang.
- Newaya Maryam succeeds his father, Newaya Krestos, as ruler of Ethiopia.
- The city of Aachen, Germany, begins adding a Roman numeral Anno Domini date to a few of its coins, the first city in the world to do so.
- The city of Phnom Penh was founded in Cambodia.

== Births ==
- February 18 – Ibn Hajar al-Asqalani, Islamic scholar (d. 1449)
- March 13 – Louis I, Duke of Orléans, son of King Charles V of France (d. 1407)
- September 8 – Thomas Holland, 1st Duke of Surrey (d. 1400)
- October – John Hastings, 3rd Earl of Pembroke (d. 1389)
- approximate date
  - Helena Dragaš, empress consort of Byzantium (d. 1450)
  - Olivera, daughter of Lazar of Serbia and wife of Bayezid I

== Deaths ==
- January 11 – Eleanor of Lancaster, English noblewoman (b. 1318)
- March 19 – John II, Marquess of Montferrat (b. 1321)
- March 21 – Rudolf VI, Margrave of Baden
- August 24 – Casimir III, Duke of Pomerania (b. 1348)
- August 31 – Ralph de Stafford, 1st Earl of Stafford, English soldier (b. 1301)
- date unknown – Bagrat I of Imereti, King of Georgia
- date unknown – Newaya Krestos, Emperor of Ethiopia
