= Duchy of Legnica =

Silesian duchy (1248–1675)

Coordinates: 51°12′30″N 16°09′37″E

Duchy of Legnica Księstwo Legnickie (Polish) Herzogtum Liegnitz (German) Lehnické knížectví (Czech)
- 1248–1675
- Coat of arms

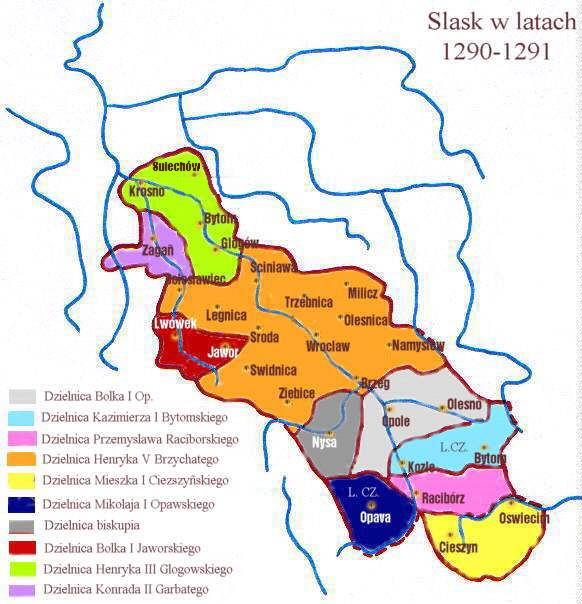
- Greatest extent of territory of the Duchy during the reign of Henry V (orange)
- Status: District duchy of Poland; Fiefdom of the Bohemian Crown (from 1348)
- Capital: Legnica
- Historical era: Middle Ages; Early modern period
  - Partitioned from the Duchy of Wrocław: 1248
  - Split off Duchy of Głogów: 1251
  - Split off Duchy of Jawor: 1274
  - Split off Duchy of Brzeg: 1311
  - Vassalized by Bohemia: 1329
  - Reunited with the Duchy of Brzeg: 1419
  - Inheritance treaty with Brandenburg: 1537
  - Seized by Habsburgs: 1675
  - Annexed by Prussia: 1763
Preceded by	Succeeded by
Duchy of Silesia	Lands of the Bohemian Crown
- Today part of: Poland; Germany¹
- ¹ Portion of Lubusz Land on the left bank of the Oder River

The Duchy of Legnica (Polish: Księstwo Legnickie, Czech: Lehnické knížectví) or Duchy of Liegnitz (German: Herzogtum Liegnitz) was one of the Duchies of Silesia, formed during the fragmentation of Poland into smaller provincial duchies, ruled by a local line of the Piast dynasty between 1248 and 1675. Its capital was Legnica in Lower Silesia.

Legnica Castle had become a residence of the Silesian dukes in 1163 and from 1248 was the seat of a principality in its own right, ruled by the Silesian branch of the Piast dynasty until the extinction of the line in 1675. Formed by Bolesław II the Bald, Duke of Lower Silesia at Wrocław, Legnica shared the fate of most of the others Silesian duchies, falling into Bohemian, Austrian and eventually—after the First Silesian War—Prussian spheres of influence.

== History ==
The town of Legnica became famous for the Battle of Legnica that took place at the nearby village of Legnickie Pole on 9 April 1241, during the first Mongol invasion of Poland. A Christian army led by the Polish High Duke Henry II the Pious, supported by the feudal nobility including Poles, Bavarian miners and military orders, was decisively defeated by the Mongols. Although Henry was killed and his forces defeated, their advance into Europe was halted when they turned back to attend to the election of a new Khagan (Grand Khan) following the death of Ögedei Khan in the same year. Minor celebrations are held annually in Legnica to commemorate the battle.

=== Establishment within Poland ===
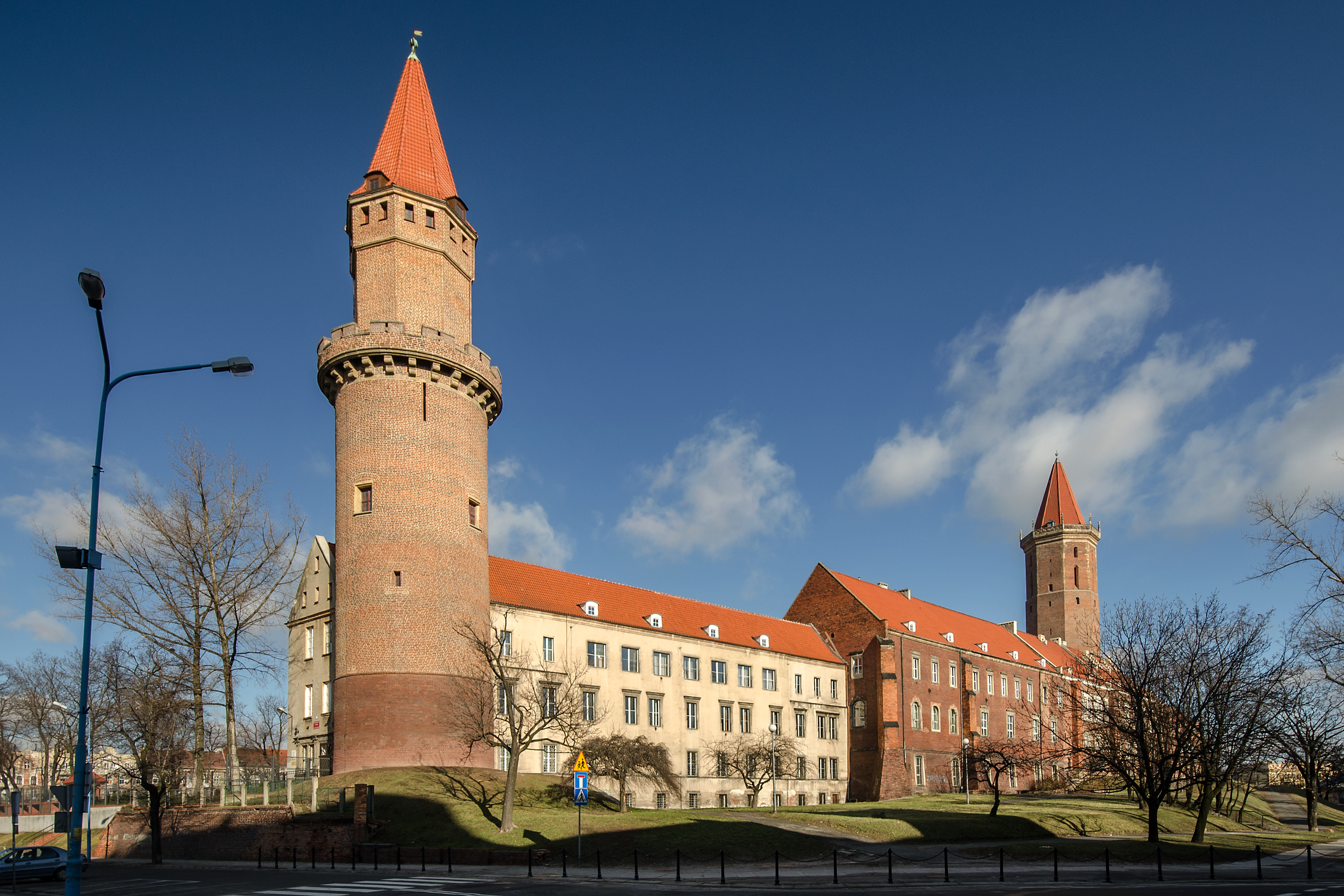
Legnica Castle

After Henry's death his eldest son Bolesław II the Bald followed him as ruler of Lower Silesia until in 1248 his younger brother Henry III the White came of age and claimed his rights of succession. Backed by the nobility of Wrocław, Henry III forced the duke to cede central parts of Lower Silesia to him, while Bolesław himself retired to Legnica. Furthermore, he came into conflict with his younger brother Konrad, who, originally predestined for an ecclesiastical career as Bishop of Passau, also demanded his distributive share and had to be paid off by Bolesław with the newly created Duchy of Głogów in 1251.

In 1277, the towns of Środa Śląska and Strzegom passed from the Duchy of Wrocław to the Duchy of Legnica.

Nevertheless, Bolesław's son Henry V the Fat, who succeeded his father in 1278, was able to enlarge the duchy's territories by defeating his cousin Henry Probus, Duke of Wrocław, and, with support of King Wenceslaus II of Bohemia succeeded him as duke in 1290. Thus, the Lower Silesian duchies of Legnica and Wrocław were re-reunited until 1311.

As after the death of Henry V in 1296, his eldest son Bolesław III the Generous was still a minor, King Wenceslaus took over his guardianship, strengthening the Bohemian influence in Silesia. In 1303 Bolesław III was betrothed to Wenceslaus' daughter Margaret and to no avail tried to follow the extinct Přemyslid dynasty on the Bohemian throne in 1306. He was not able to retain the united duchy and in 1311 Lower Silesia was split again, with Wrocław going to his younger brother Henry VI the Good. Even Bolesław's rule over Legnica was contested by his brother Władysław and in 1329 he had to pay homage to the Bohemian King John of Luxembourg to secure his reign.

As the duchy's capital at the beginning of the 14th century, Legnica was an important city of Central Europe, with a population of approximately 16,000 residents. The city began to expand quickly after the discovery of gold in the Kaczawa.

=== As a Bohemian fiefdom ===
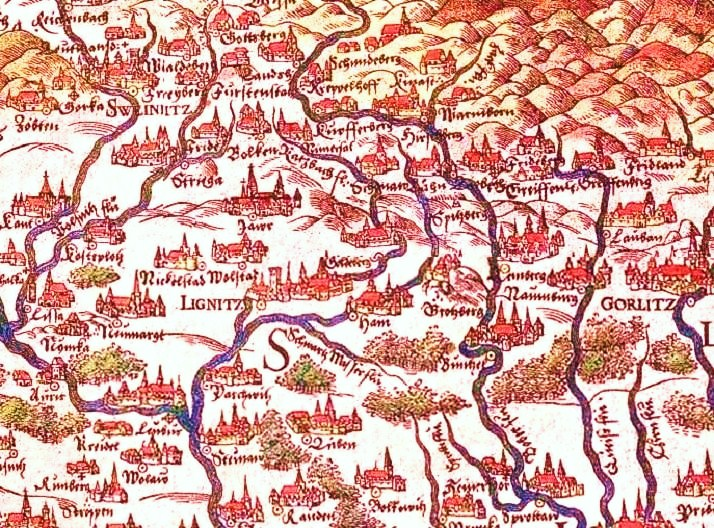
First geographical map of Lower Silesia (to south) by Martin Helwig, 1561

Piast state from 1329 onwards became a vassal of Bohemia, the political weakness of the duchy continued, caused by domestic conflicts between Bolesław's the Wastefull sons Wenceslaus and Louis the Fair strengthening the influences of the Bohemian monarchs. When in 1419 the Legnica branch of the Silesian Piasts became extinct with the death of Duke Wenceslaus II, the duchy was inherited by Duke Louis II of Brzeg. As Louis himself had no male heirs, Legnica was annexed as a ceased fief by the Bohemian king Sigismund in 1436. A long-standing dispute arose, as the late Duke Louis II had bequeathed his estates to the sons of his step-brother Duke Henry IX of Lubin –though without the consent of the Bohemian overlord. Eventually, in 1455 the duchy was inherited by Frederick I, the son of Louis' daughter Hedwig, who was officially enfeoffed by King Matthias Corvinus in 1469.

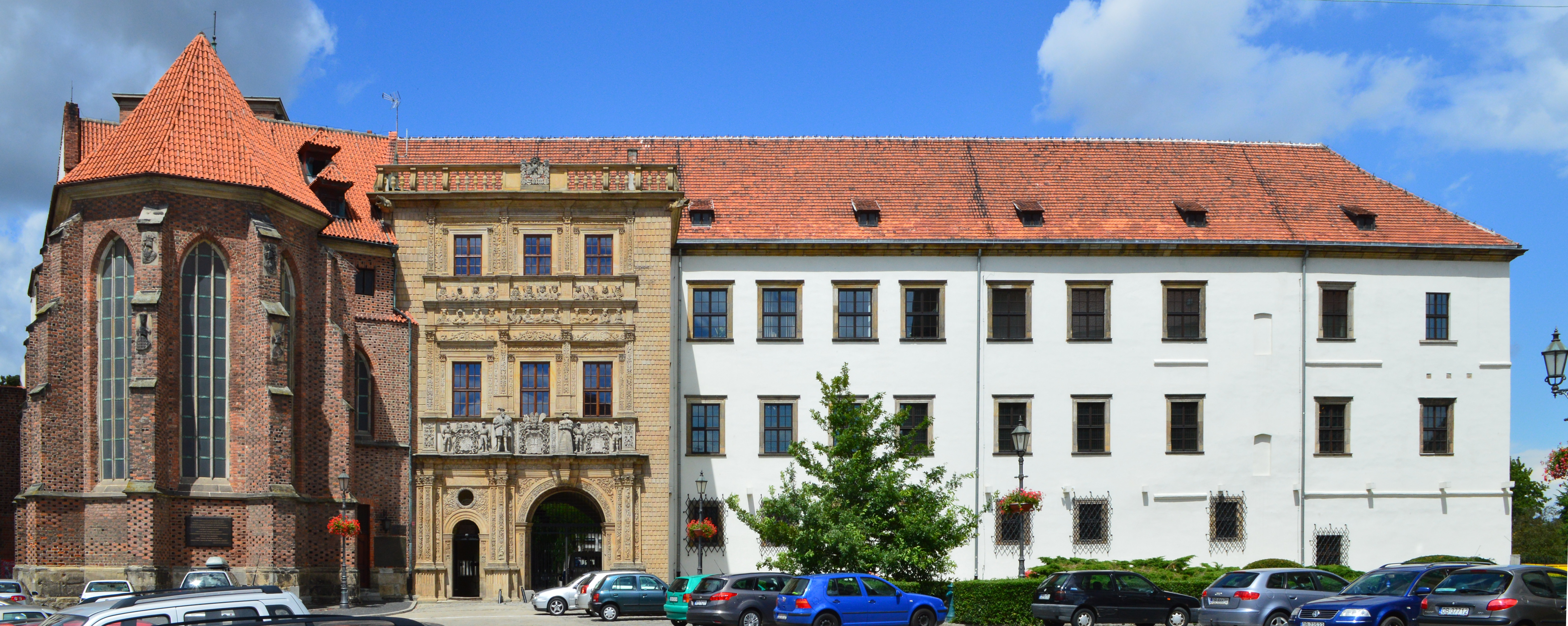
Brzeg Castle

Frederick's son Frederick II, Duke from 1499, again inherited the Duchy of Brzeg in 1520. The Protestant Reformation was introduced in the duchy as early as 1522, decisively promoted by the theologians Caspar Schwenckfeld and Valentin Krautwald, and the population quickly turned Lutheran. This led to conflict when, after the death of the Bohemian King Louis II at the Battle of Mohács in 1526, the Lands of the Bohemian Crown including the Legnica fief were incorporated into the Habsburg monarchy of the Catholic king Ferdinand. In turn, Duke Frederick II signed an inheritance pact with the Hohenzollern elector Joachim II Hector of Brandenburg, a cousin of his second wife Sophia. However, King Ferdinand I, rejecting any Hohenzollern influence within the Habsburg lands, declared the agreement null and void.

The struggles continued, though the duchy was officially guaranteed freedom of religion by the 1648 Peace of Westphalia. After the death of the last Piast duke, George William, in 1675, Legnica passed to the direct rule of the Habsburg emperor Leopold I, despite claims raised by Elector Frederick William of Brandenburg referring to the inheritance pact in 1537. For the Prussian king Frederick the Great, the old dispute was a pretext to justify his campaign during the First Silesian War: in 1742 most of Silesia including Legnica was occupied by the Prussian Army after Empress Maria Theresa's defeat in the War of the Austrian Succession. Finally in 1763 the duchy lost most of its privileges after being incorporated into Prussia according to the Peace of Hubertusburg.

Countess Auguste von Harrach became the Princess of Liegnitz after her marriage in 1824 to King Frederick William III of Prussia.

== Dukes of Legnica ==
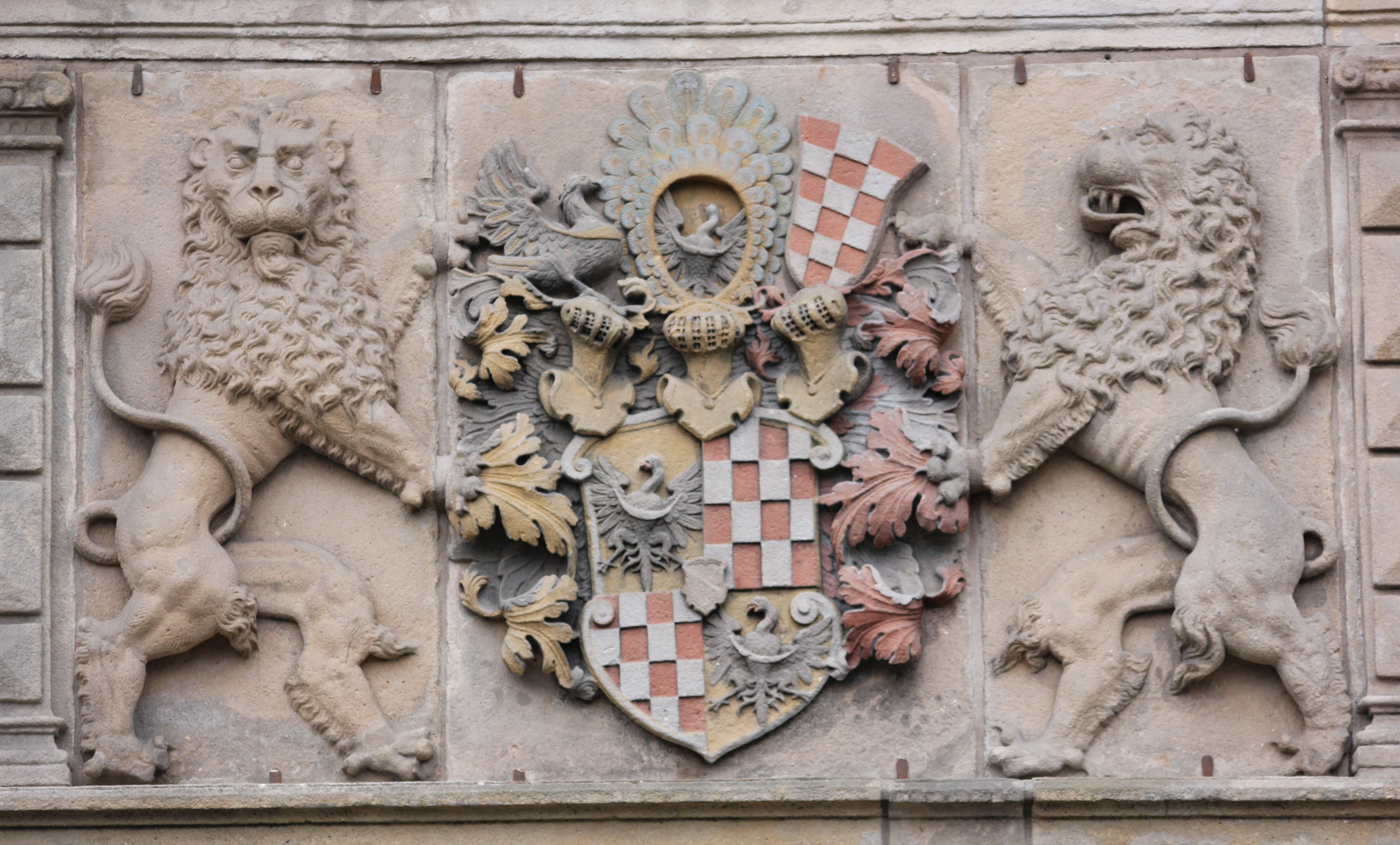
Coat of arms of the Duchy, Odrzańska Gate, Brzeg

- 1248–1278 Bolesław II the Bald, eldest son of the Polish High Duke Henry II the Pious, jointly with
  - 1248–1251 Konrad I, brother, Duke of Głogów from 1251
- 1278–1296 Henry V, son of Bolesław II, also Duke of Wrocław from 1290
- 1296–1311 Bolesław III the Generous, son, also Duke of Wrocław, Duke of Brzeg from 1311, jointly with
  - 1296–1311 Henry VI the Good, brother, sole Duke of Wrocław from 1311
  - 1296–1312 Władysław
- 1312–1342 Bolesław III the Generous, again
- 1342–1345 Wenceslaus I, son, jointly with
  - 1342–1346 Louis I the Fair, brother, Duke of Brzeg from 1358
- 1346–1364 Wenceslaus I, again
- 1364–1409 Rupert I, son, jointly with
  - 1364–1413 Wenceslaus II, brother, also Bishop of Wrocław and Duke of Nysa from 1382
  - 1364–1394 Bolesław IV, brother
  - 1364–1398 Henry VIII, brother, also Bishop of Kujawy from 1389
- 1413–1436 Louis II, grandson of Louis I the Fair, also Duke of Brzeg since 1399

Line extinct, seized by Bohemia

  - 1436–1453 claimed by Louis III of Oława, nephew of Louis II, and his sons John I of Lüben and Henryk X of Chojnów
- 1454–1488 Frederick I, son of John I of Lüben, also Duke of Brzeg from 1481
- 1488–1495 John II, son, jointly with
  - 1488–1547 Frederick II, brother, also Duke of Brzeg 1503–1505 and from 1521
  - 1488–1521 George I, also Duke of Brzeg from 1503
- 1547–1551 Frederick III, son of Frederick II, deposed
- 1551–1556 Henry XI, son, under regency of his uncle Duke George II of Brzeg
- 1556–1559 Frederick III, again, deposed,
- 1559–1576; 1580–1581 Henry XI, again, twice restored and again deposed, jointly with
  - 1571–1596 Frederick IV, brother
- 1596–1602 Joachim Frederick, son of George II of Brzeg, Duke of Brezeg since 1595
- 1602–1612 John Christian, son, also Duke of Brzeg, jointly with
  - 1602–1653 George Rudolph, brother
- 1653–1654 George III, son of John Christian, also Duke of Brzeg since 1633, jointly with
  - 1653–1663 Louis IV, brother, also Duke of Brzeg 1633–1654
  - 1653–1654 Christian, brother, also Duke of Brzeg 1633–1654
- 1663–1664 George III, again, jointly with
  - 1663–1672 Christian, again, also Duke of Brzeg from 1664
- 1672–1675 George William, son, also Duke of Brzeg

Male line of Silesian Piasts extinct.

== Sources ==
- Rudolf Žáček, Dějiny Slezska v datech, Libri Praha 2003, ISBN 80-7277-172-8
