= Henryk VIII =

Henryk VIII may refer to

- Henry VIII of Legnica (ca. 1355 – 1398)
- Henry VIII the Sparrow (ca. 1357 – 1397)
