= City walls in Lubin =

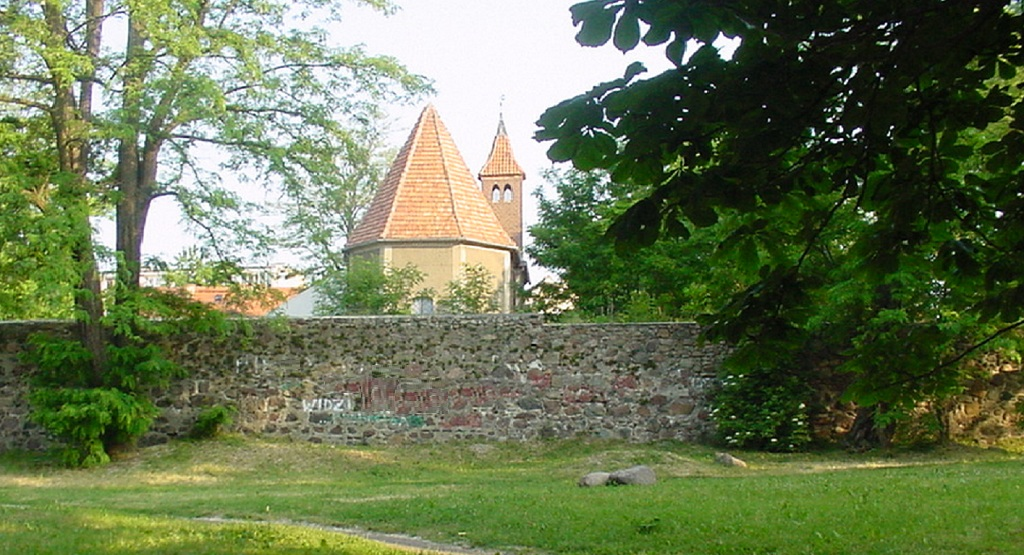
City wall on the Castle Hill; Castle chapel in the background

City walls in Lubin - built in the 14th century possibly in the place of old ramparts reinforced with a palisade, which surrounded the city and served a defensive function. Extensive construction of the walls took place in the years 1348-1358 - just before and during the civil war between the sons of Bolesław the Generous, when Lubin was the residence of Duke Louis I of Brzeg. The construction of the walls was completed in the second half of the 14th century when they were incorporated into the city's defensive system.

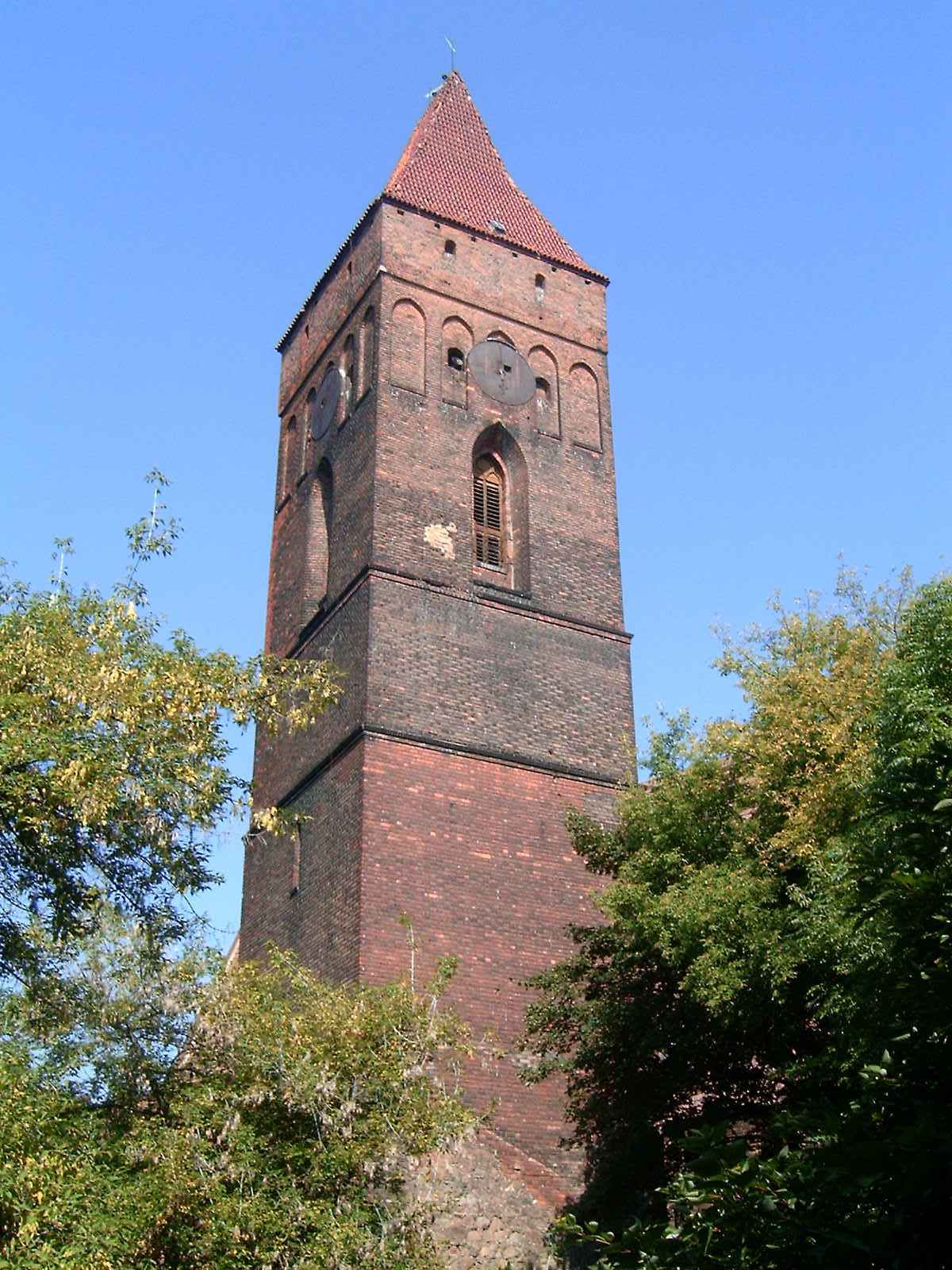
The square tower in the southeastern part of the wall, built at the end of the fifteenth century and transformed into a bell tower.

The walls were built using crushed rock gravel, erratic boulders and brick, bound with lime mortar. The ground part of the whole fortification system was made of stone, while the higher parts were made of handmade Gothic brick, in a single line system. The original height of the walls ranged from 4 to 5 meters while the thickness of the walls ranged from 1.5 meters in the top part to over 2 meters in the ground part. The walls were raised by 1 m on average in the 15th century. The cavities were later supplemented with bricks. The walls were reinforced by a total of fifteen towers open from the side of the town, erected on a rectangular plan, situated at a distance of 40 to 50 m apart. Three gates guarded the entrances to the town: Głogowska, Ścinawska and Wrocławska, also called Legnicka. The Głogowska Gate was the most fortified one, featuring a turret. The Głogowska Gate consisted of double walls and a triple moat. The remaining gates had double walls and foregates with a double moat. The city's defense system also included a rebuilt and significantly expanded castle system. Thanks to that Lubin was one of the most fortified towns in Silesia at the time and managed to resist both Hussite invasions in 1428 and 1431. At the end of the 14th century a pedestrian church gate was built in the southern part of the walls, which led from the church square to the cemetery outside the walls. The gate was secured by a small foregate which was additionally strengthened by a square tower next to it, built in the late fifteenth century and transformed into a high campanile - a bell tower above the temple, connected to it by a suspended brick arcade. Originally, the walls and the tower on the side of the town were topped with battlements. In the 15th and 16th century, due to the increasing use of firearms and the change of siege operations, the existing defence system of the walls was modernized and extended. The upper floors of the tower were equipped with artillery galleries, whereas behind the wall, ramparts with a second moat were erected.

The 14th century city walls of Lubin are listed in the register of monuments.

== Current state ==
To date, about 70% of the former city walls and a portion of the fortifications have been preserved in good condition on a large section of the old town's outskirts, e.g.:

- Artillery positions and shooting galleries in the corner tower, located in the southwestern part of the walls.
- Two towers in the southern section of the wall and four towers in the northern section.
- The Głogowska Tower with a gate turret.
- A square tower by the church, erected at the end of the 15th century and transformed into a bell tower.
- Suspended, arched brick porch connecting the church with the former wall tower.
