= Wenceslaus I of Legnica =

Wenceslaus I
- Duke of Legnica
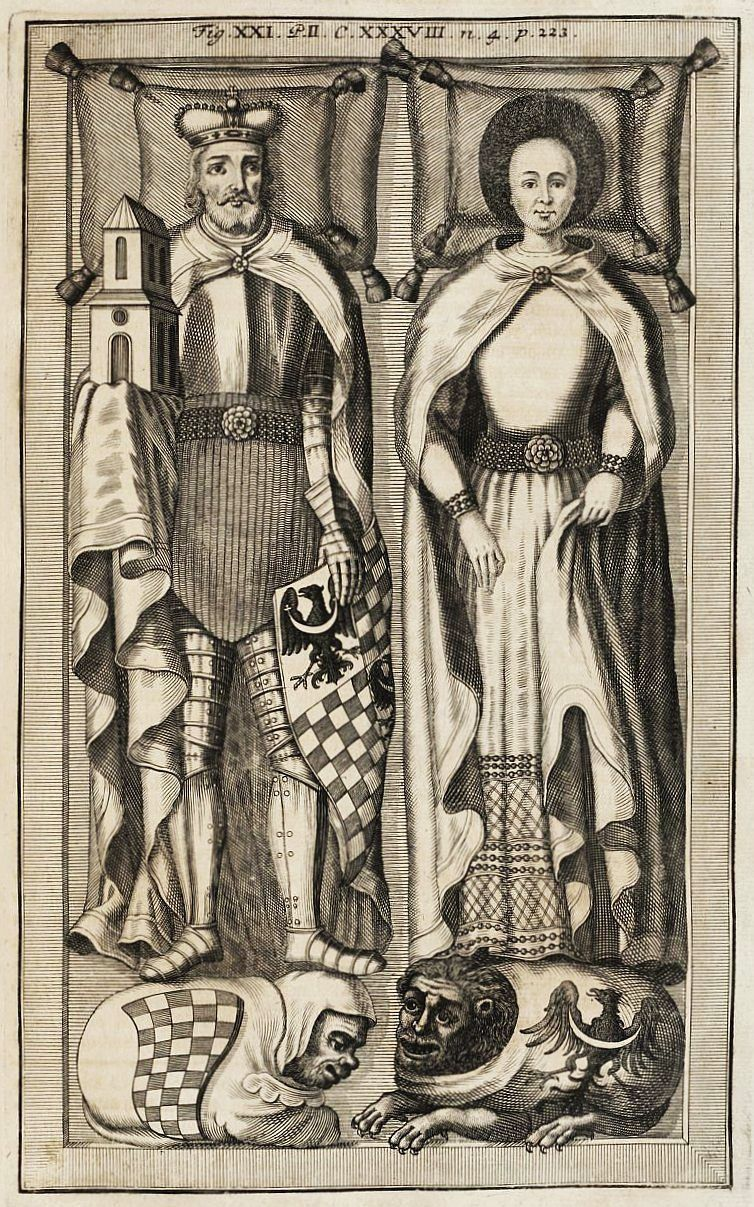
- Wenceslaus I of Legnica with his wife Anna of Cieszyn
- Born: c. 1318
- Died: 2 June 1364
- Noble family: Silesian Piasts
- Spouse: Anna of Cieszyn
- Issue: Rupert I of Legnica; Wenceslaus II; Bolesław IV of Legnica; Hedwig of Legnica; Henry VIII of Legnica
- Father: Bolesław III the Generous
- Mother: Margaret of Bohemia

Wenceslaus I, Duke of Legnica (Polish: Wacław I legnicki; c. 1318 – 2 June 1364) was a Duke of Namysłów from 1338 and of Legnica-Brzeg from 1342 until his death, but with further divisions with his brother Louis I. He was the eldest son of Bolesław III the Generous, Duke of Legnica-Brzeg, and Margaret of Bohemia. He was named after his maternal grandfather, King Wenceslaus II of Bohemia.

== Biography ==
=== Early years ===
The circumstances surrounding Wenceslaus's childhood and adolescence are unknown. The first attested presence of the young heir of Legnica-Brzeg was in 1329, when he, alongside his father, paid homage to King John of Bohemia, his uncle, husband of his maternal aunt Elisabeth.

=== Co-ruler ===
Bolesław III's free-spending ways infuriated Wenceslaus, who worried about the fate of the family's patrimony. This prompted Wenceslaus to rebel against his father. Bolesław III did not want to fight with his son, and so gave him the Duchy of Namysłów as an independent fief in 1338. Four years later (1342), Bolesław III decided to abdicate all his lands to his two surviving sons – Wenceslaus and his younger brother Louis I of Brzeg – in exchange for Namysłów, which was almost immediately sold by Bolesław III to King Casimir III the Great. Together with his second wife, Katharina Šubić, Bolesław III retired to the small towns of Brzeg and Oława, where he retained residences.

The two brothers initially decided to co-rule without any land divisions, in order to pay the huge debts of the duchy. The resources of Legnica were minimal because their eccentric father had sold several productive parcels of land. Even the extraction of gold from the mines of Mikołajowice proved insufficient.

In 1345, the brothers decided upon a formal division of their authority and rule. Louis convince his older brother to ceded him the overlordship of Legnica in exchange for the towns of Złotoryja, Chojnów, Chocianów and Lubin (Lüben).

=== Consolidation of power ===
However, within one year, Wenceslaus changed his mind, believing the division of the Duchy of Legnica to be inherently inequitable. Two reasons motivated him: he was seriously ill, and after eight years of childless marriage, his wife was expecting their first child. Wenceslaus claimed all the inheritance of Legnica; in exchange, he promised to name Louis as his sole heir, even if his unborn child was a son. Louis agreed and resigned his lands to Wenceslaus. In exchange, he received monetary compensation of 400 pieces of silver per year and the possession of the palace of Buczyna.

The unexpected renunciation by Louis, without a fight, may have been motivated by his belief that his brother was dying and that he would soon regain Legnica. However, with time it became apparent that Wenceslaus, despite his illness, was not dying. The situation was further complicated by the birth of the first of Wenceslaus's four sons, Rupert.

Louis sought to annul his resignation on the basis that the promised annual compensation was not paid, but without success. The situation remained in an unstable peace until the death of Bolesław III (21 April 1352), which resulted in a civil war between the brothers.

=== Period of conflict ===
Despite attempts at mediation by Duke Konrad I of Oleśnica, Przecław von Pogarell, Bishop of Wrocław, and Emperor Charles IV, the war continued for six years, during which time both sides won and lost advantage. The war ended in July 1359, when a settlement was reached between the brothers. In that settlement, Wenceslaus – who lost the final battle – was compelled to give to Louis the districts of Brzeg-Oława (which returned to him after the death of their stepmother, Katharina Šubić) and Chojnów as an independent duchy (however, one half of Brzeg-Oława, with Byczyna, were already sold by Wenceslaus to Duke Bolko II of Świdnica). An additional concession by Wenceslaus was the payment of 4,500 pieces of silver to his younger brother as compensation for damages.

In addition to the conflict with his brother, Wenceslaus was also involved in promoting the rule of the House of Luxembourg in Silesia. In 1348 he represented the Emperor as a mediator in a dispute between the Bishop of Wrocław, Przecław von Pogarell, and the local nobility. In February 1348, Wenceslaus was part of the entourage who accompanied Emperor Charles IV, when he traveled to Bautzen in order to arrange a meeting with Frederick II, Margrave of Meissen and Landgrave of Thuringia with the purpose of settling their frontier disputes. Eleven years later, in 1360, Wenceslaus was again a mediator in the dispute between Duke Konrad I of Oleśnica and Duke Przemyslaus I of Cieszyn (Teschen) over the control of the Duchy of Bytom-Koźle.

=== Final years ===
During the entire period of his reign, Wenceslaus was confronted with the financial difficulties of his duchy. The lands and property that he had inherited from his father, Duke Bolesław III, came with enormous debts attached. In an effort to manage this debt, Wenceslaus was forced to rent out large portions of his duchy to neighboring princes and bishops, and even ordinary knights and townspeople.

Despite the disastrous financial situation of Legnica, Wenceslaus embarked upon several costly ventures, in an effort to raise the prestige of the Duchy, and himself. He founded a Benedictine monastery and Kolegiate in Legnica called Church of God (Polish: Bożego Grobu), and ordered the creation of a gold coin called a wacławki, which was circulated throughout the realm.

Wenceslaus died on 2 June 1364 and was buried in the Church of God in Legnica, which was then under construction. His excommunication, as a punishment for unpaid debts, led to major complications. It was not until 1365 that his sons finally obtained a pardon for him. Wenceslaus's ornate tombstone remains intact and is currently maintained in the Legnica Cathedral.

== Marriage and issue ==
By 1338, Wenceslaus married Anna (b. c. 1325 – d. 1367), daughter of Duke Casimir I of Cieszyn. They had:

1. Rupert I (b. 27 March 1347 – d. bef. 12 January 1409)
2. Wenceslaus II (b. 1348 – d. 30 December 1419).
3. Bolesław IV (b. c. 1349 – d. 3/4 March 1394).
4. Hedwig (b. c. 1351 – d. 1 August 1409), married on 10 February 1372 to Henry VI, Duke of Głogów-Żagań.
5. Henry VIII (b. c. 1355 – d. 12 December 1398).

== Sources ==
- Czechowicz, Bogusław (2021). "Sources and Ways of Wrocław's Promotion in the Structures of the Bohemian Crown in the Luxembourg Era: Polemic Recapitulation". The City and History. 10 (2): 6–36. doi:10.33542/CAH2021-2-01.
- Wojtkowiak, Joanna (2021). "Boleslaw II the Bald Duke of Legnica as Princeps Inutilis". In Wakounig, Marija; Kühnel, Ferdinand (eds.). People and Ideas on the Move. Lit Verlag. pp. 61–76. ISBN 9783643912015.

Wenceslaus I of Legnica House of Piast Born: circa 1318 Died: 2 June 1364
Preceded by Bolesław III the Generous	Duke of Namysłów; 1338–1342	Succeeded by Bolesław III the Generous
Preceded by Bolesław III the Generous	Duke of Legnica with Louis I 1342–1345	Succeeded by Louis I the Fair
Preceded by Louis I the Fair	Duke of Legnica; 1346–1364	Succeeded by Rupert I Wenceslaus II; Bolesław IV; Henry VIII
Preceded by Katharina	Duke of Brzeg; 1358	Succeeded by Bolko II the Small and Louis I the Fair
