= Wenceslaus II of Legnica =

Wenceslaus II
- Duke of Legnica, Nysa-Otmuchów; Bishop of Lebus; Prince-Bishop of Breslau
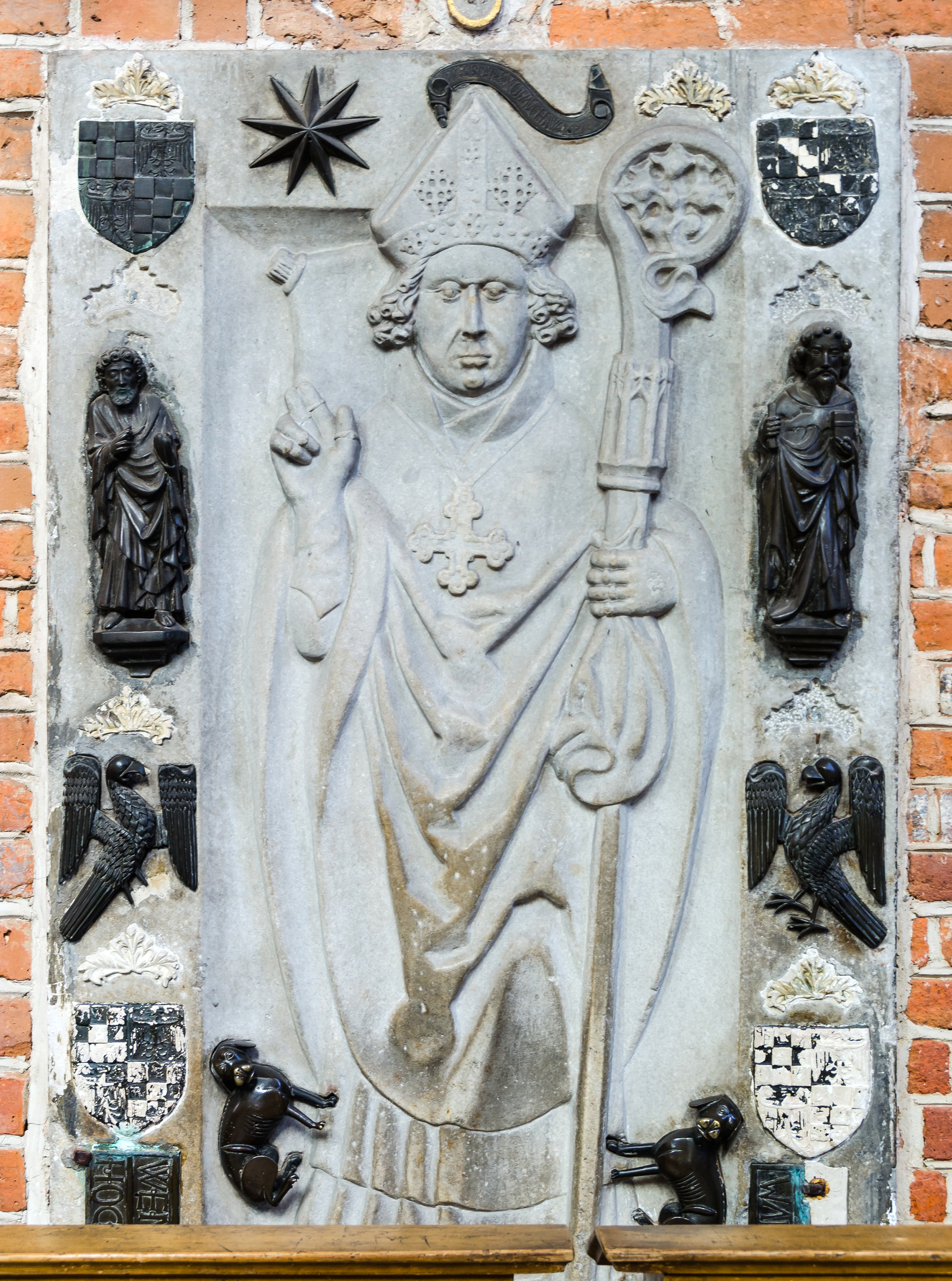
- Wenceslaus II's tombstone in Nysa
- Born: 1348
- Died: 30 December 1419 (aged 70–71)
- Noble family: Silesian Piasts
- Father: Wenceslaus I of Legnica
- Mother: Anna of Cieszyn

Wenceslaus II, Duke of Legnica (Polish: Wacław II legnicki; 1348 – 30 December 1419) was a Duke of Legnica from 1364 (only nominal; from 1409 he reigned alone and personally) until 1413, Bishop of Lebus (1375–82) and Breslau (Wrocław) (1382–1417; also Duke of Nysa-Otmuchów.

He was the second son of Wenceslaus I of Legnica, by his wife Anna, daughter of Casimir I, Duke of Cieszyn.

== Life ==
Duke Wenceslaus I didn't want to divide the already small Duchy of Legnica between his sons; therefore, he destined Wenceslaus II and his younger brothers Bolesław IV and Henry VIII to the Church, leaving his oldest son Rupert I as the only and true ruler over Duchy of Legnica. By 1363, Wenceslaus II was appointed as a Canon of the cathedral chapter in Breslau (although he only took formal possession of this post in 1368).

After his father's death in 1364, Wenceslaus II and his brothers were placed under the guardianship of their uncle Ludwik I the Fair and later by his older brother Rupert I. Louis I took a special interest in the spiritual career of his nephew and since 1371, prepared him for the future post of Bishop of Breslau.

Since 1363, Wenceslaus II began his studies in the University of Prague, and in the decade of 1370 he travelled to Montpellier, France, where he obtained a degree in canon law. In 1373, he was chosen as canon of Olomouc.

On 3 December 1375, Wenceslaus II was appointed by Pope Gregory XI as Bishop of Lebus, although by canon law, the legal minimum age for this type of post was thirty years. From the rule of Wenceslaus II in Lebus was known little; only some information was found on Wenceslaus as bishop as to the Synod in Kalisz in 1378, convening the bishops of the suffragans with Lebus' then metropolitan Archdiocese of Gniezno.

The diocese of Lebus produced few incomes. In addition, its location on the border between Brandenburg and Bohemia left Lebus considerably damaged during the war between Wittelsbachs the Luxemburgs. For this, Wenceslaus decided to move the diocesan capital to Fürstenwalde.

In 1378, the chance to obtain the diocese of Breslau appeared before Wenceslaus II, because the bishop elect, Theodore of Klatow, didn't receive papal approval. Initially, it appeared that the election of Wenceslaus II would not cause any problems, but the death of Emperor Charles IV and the Western Schism in the Church left the post vacant for almost six years, until 19 April 1382, when Wenceslaus II finally received confirmation of the pope as the new bishop. During 1379–1382 Wenceslaus II's brother Henry VIII acted as administrator of the diocese and facilitated the nomination.

Wenceslaus II quickly became known for his forceful politics, standing invariably at the side of the Roman Papacy; as a reward for his loyalty in 1385, Pope Urban VI wanted to give him the title of cardinal. For unknown reasons, the duke-bishop refused.

In the first years of his rule in the Breslau Diocese, Wenceslaus II was merged in a bitter dispute with the local nobility, who tried to eliminate the law immunities of the Church. Shortly afterwards he was requested to make a settlement of the dispute to King Wenceslaus IV, which Breslau, whose bishops resisted to allow the King to grant them the church property, including churches, as a fiefs. The case was even more serious for Wenceslaus II, because he didn't have yet the king's approval for his episcopal dignity.

The settlement was finally made in 1382: Breslau obtained the right to import goods from outside the clergy district (permitted only on the acquisition of their own needs, without the possibility of sales). In addition, King Wenceslaus IV approved for young Liegnitz Duke the Episcopal dignity and then Wenceslaus II officially received the Duchy of Neisse-Ottmachau as a fief belonging to the Diocese of Breslau.

As Bishop of Wrocław, Wenceslaus II was an efficient administrator. In 1415 he ordered the imposition and modification in the episcopal diocese of a secular law court, which most of his items in the next few centuries become in patterns for the rest of Silesian courts. Wenceslaus II's activities were expressed in Synods organized by him (in 1401, 1405, 1406 and 1410).

The Duke-Bishop was also known for giving large sums to the Church foundations. During this time were founded: the Canon College in Ottmachau, and collegiate churches in both Głogów) and Falkenberg (Niemodlin). In the disputes between the Silesian Duchies and the Church, he didn't hesitate to use the excommunication on his relatives (for example, the ban was applied by him to Duke Bolko IV of Opole).

This attitude caused several problems for Wenceslaus II, in particular the attacks on estates whose leaders were banned by him (like Duke Henry IX of Lüben). To raise funds for the defense, Wenceslaus didn't hesitate to pledge Church property.

On 12 January 1409, after the death of his last surviving brother Rupert I without male issue, Wenceslaus II became the sole heir of the Duchy of Legnica; two months later, on 19 March, he designated as his heirs the brothers Henry IX and Louis II of Brieg, grandsons of Louis I the Fair. In 1413, Wenceslaus managed to unite the Diocese of Breslau and the Duchy of Liegnitz in one state, trying in that way to save the title of Bishop to his successors.

On 16 March 1413, Wenceslaus II resigned from the government of the duchy and gave it to Louis II. That decision triggered several wars between Henry IX and Louis II, because the older brother Henry IX resented that the whole principality was given to Louis II. Henry protested to Wenceslaus II and tried to convince him to revert his decision, but the Duke-Bishop maintained the inheritance over Louis.

In 1417, the tired and old Wenceslaus II sent to Pope Martin V his resignation from the bishopric. Soon, Rome decided to approve it and on 17 December 1417 was chosen the new Bishop of Breslau: Duke Konrad IV the Elder.

Wenceslaus II then retired to the Episcopal seat of Ottmachau, where he spent his last years. He died on 30 December 1419, and was buried in the local collegiate church of St. Nicholas. After the transfer of the Chapter, all the Bishop's remains with their tombstones were moved to Neisse. Since 1682 Wenceslaus II's remains and tombstone were placed in the Church of St. Jakob.

Wenceslaus II of Legnica House of Piast Born: 1348 Died: 30 December 1419 in Ottmachau/Otmuchów
Regnal titles
Preceded by Wenceslaus I	Duke of Legnica with Rupert I (until 1409), Bolesław IV (until 1394), and Henry VIII (until 1398); 1364–1413	Succeeded by Louis II
Catholic Church titles
Preceded by Peter I of Oppeln	Bishop of Lebus; 1375-1382	Succeeded by John II von Kittlitz
Vacant Title last held by Przecław of Pogorzela	Bishop of Wrocław; 1382–1417	Succeeded by Konrad IV
Vacant Title last held by Przecław of Pogorzela	Duke of Nysa; 1382–1417	Succeeded by Konrad IV
