= Henry VIII of Legnica =

Henry VIII
- Duke of Legnica; Bishop of Włocławek
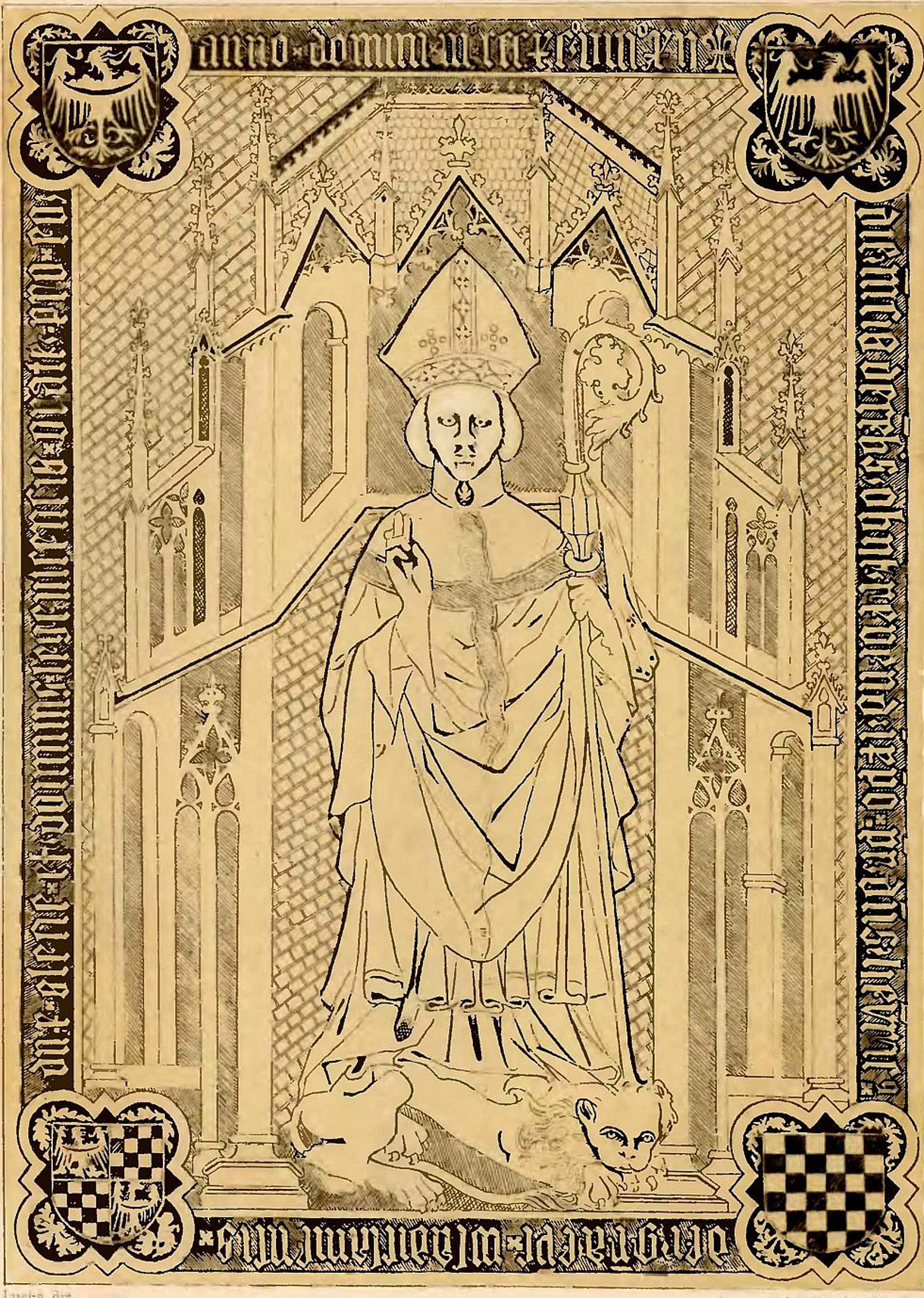
- Born: c. 1355
- Died: 12 December 1398 (aged 42–43); Legnica
- Buried: Wrocław Cathedral
- Noble family: Silesian Piasts
- Father: Wenceslaus I of Legnica
- Mother: Anna of Cieszyn

Henry VIII of Legnica (Polish: Henryk VIII legnicki; c. 1355 – 12 December 1398) was a Duke of Legnica beginning in 1364 (nominally and together with his brothers) and Bishop of Włocławek from 1389 until his death, member of the Legnica line of the Piast dynasty.

He was the fourth son of Duke Wenceslaus I of Legnica, by his wife Anna, daughter of Casimir I, Duke of Cieszyn.

== Life ==
Duke Wenceslaus I destined his three younger sons (Henry VIII and his two older brothers Wenceslaus II and Bolesław IV) to the Church, in order to prevent further divisions of the already small Duchy of Legnica, and gave the full authority over Legnica to his oldest son Rupert I.

After his father's death in 1364, Henry VIII and his siblings were placed under the tutelage of their uncle Louis I the Fair who, followed the wishes of his late brother, installed him as a canon of the Collegiate Church of the Holy Cross in Wrocław in 1378. A year later, Henry VIII was appointed provost of the Chapter of the Wrocław Cathedral.

On 21 May 1379 Henry VIII, together with his brothers, went to Prague and paid his homage to the King Wenceslaus IV.

By the early autumn of that year, Henry VIII was elected administrator of the Diocese of Wrocław; on 19 April 1382, his older brother Wenceslaus II was finally confirmed as Bishop of the Diocese. During the period of his administration, Henry VIII's disputes with the local nobility finally erupted when his older brother Rupert I send him a dozen kegs of beer from Swidnica as a gift. Henry VIII refused to pay the tax on the imported beer, in derogation of the beer-monopoly of the Wrocław City Council. The beer was seized by the city. Henry VIII, referring to the privileges of the chapter, called for the returning of the Church's goods; the City Council refused, which enraged Henry, who announced the imminent interdict on the city if they didn't accept his demands. The dispute, despite the attempted mediation of the Archbishop of Gniezno, Janusz Suchywilk and King Wenceslaus IV of Bohemia (who even ordered the plundering of the property of Wrocław's Canons, treating them as responsible for the prolonged conflict), dragged on and only ended in May 1382, as a result of the compromise ruling of the papal Legate, Bishop Thomas Lucerii.

In 1388, Henry VIII, in exchange for his resignation of the administration of the Diocese of Wrocław, received from Pope Urban VI the Bishopric of the remote Cambrai in Flanders.

Henry VIII refused this nomination because of the opportunity to take over the diocese of Włocławek after the current holder, his relative Jan Kropidło – also Duke of Opole, resigned from his post to become the Archbishopric of Gniezno. With the nomination of Henry VIII for a richest Bishopric in Poland, he had the same political influence of the powerful Bishop of Kraków, Piotr Wysz.

The official ordinance of Henry VIII as Bishop of Włocławek, which as a Diocese included not only Kuyavia in Poland, but the portion of Gdańsk Pomerania within the State of the Teutonic Order, took place on 14 May 1389.

Henry VIII's rule over Włocławek lasted nine years, during which time he had little interest in the fate of his subjects, his interest was limited only to receiving the large revenue from the Bishopric. He lived mostly in Silesia in the lands of his brothers Rupert I and Wenceslaus II: Legnica, Wrocław and Otmuchów.

Henry VIII died in Legnica on 12 December 1398, probably poisoned during the banquet given by the Archbishop of Gniezno, Dobrogost z Nowego Dworu. He was buried in the Wrocław Cathedral; his tombstone, situated in the south nave, remains there today.

== See also ==
- Duchy of Legnica
- Duchy of Opole
- Silesian Piasts
- Piast dynasty
- Roman Catholic Diocese of Włocławek
- Roman Catholic Archdiocese of Wrocław

Preceded by Wenceslaus I	Duke of Legnica with Rupert I, Wenceslaus II, and Bolesław IV (until 1394); 1364–1398	Succeeded by Rupert I and Wenceslaus II
Preceded by Jan Kropidło	Bishop of Włocławek; 1389–1398	Succeeded by Mikołaj Kurowski
