= Legnica Castle =

Castle in southwest Poland

- Zamek Piastowski w Legnicy (Polish)
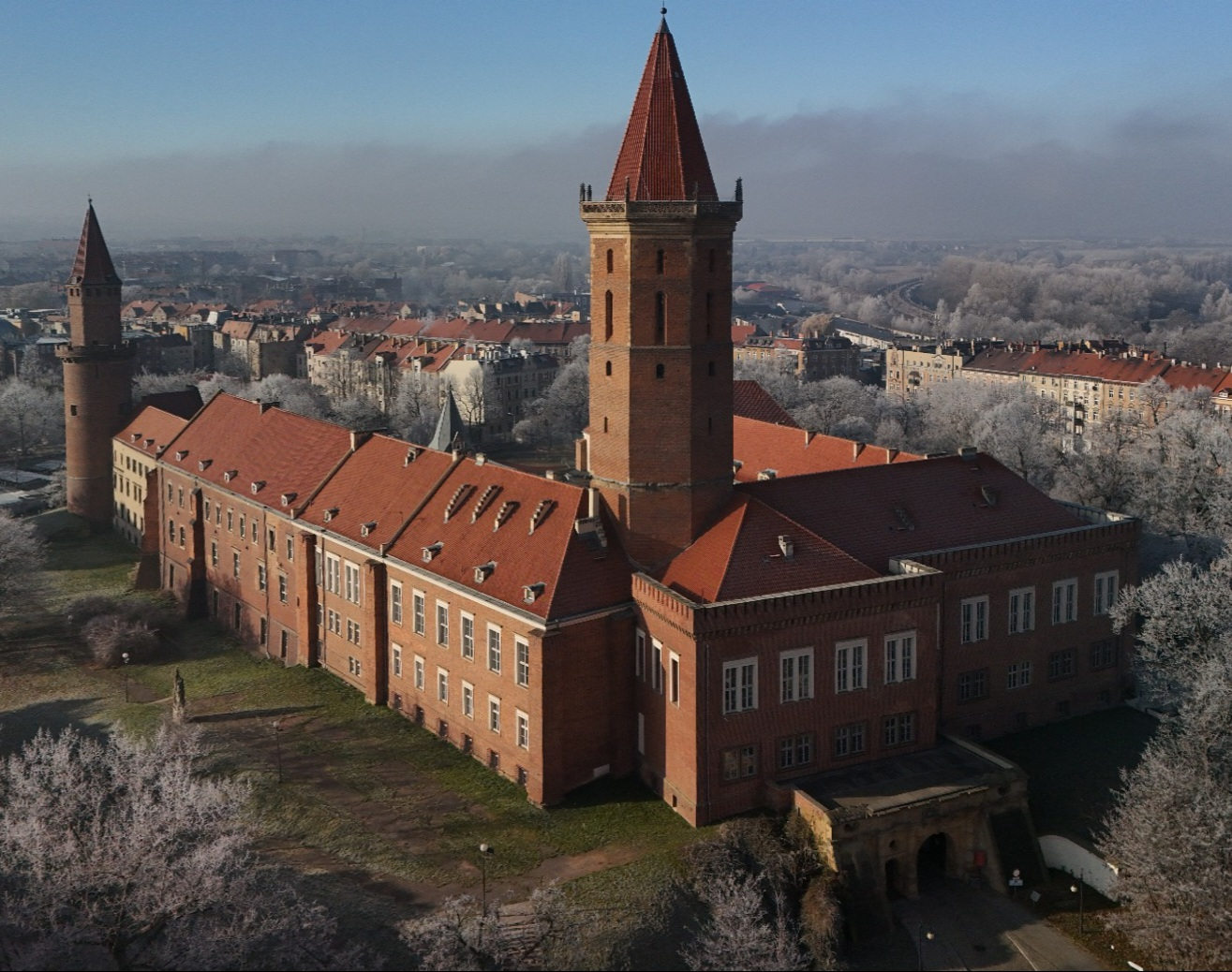
- The castle with its two towers, St. Peter in the foreground and St. Jadwiga in the background.

- Location within Poland Location within Lower Silesian Voivodeship
- Interactive map of the Legnica Castle area

General information
- Architectural style: Romanesque, Brick Gothic, Renaissance, Baroque and Gothic Revival
- Location: Legnica, Lower Silesia, Poland
- Coordinates: 51°12′40″N 16°09′43″E
- Construction started: 12th century
- Client: Bolesław I the Tall; Henry the Bearded

Technical details
- Material: Stone, brick

Legnica Castle (Polish: Zamek Piastowski w Legnicy; German: Schloss Liegnitz) is a medieval castle located in Legnica, in southwestern Poland. It was originally built by duke Bolesław I the Tall in the second half of the 12th century and expanded by his successor, Henry the Bearded, in the early 13th century. One of the oldest stone castles in the country, it was an important political and residential center of the Silesian Piast dynasty and became the principal residence of the Dukes of Legnica.

The initial structure possessed strong defensive walls, towers, and other fortifications erected atop an older gord, or hamlet. Two of its most prominent surviving features are two large towers. After the extinction of the Legnica branch of the Silesian Piasts in the 17th century, the castle lost much of its political importance. It was subsequently used for administrative and military purposes. The castle complex was repeatedly damaged by fires and subsequently reconstructed and modified; it contains elements dating from later periods, reflecting centuries of architectural changes, including traces of Romanesque, Brick Gothic, Renaissance, Baroque and Gothic Revival architecture. Significant historical elements of the medieval castle have survived.

== History ==
=== Early gords (8th-12th century) ===
As early as the 8th century, a gord (Polish: gród) was established at the tributary junction of the Czarna Woda and Kaczawa (Katzbach) rivers. In around 985 a new fort was constructed by Mieszko I of Poland to protect Silesia following its incorporation into the Civitas Schinesghe – the Piast Duchy of Poland. Archeological studies suggested the fort was predominantly used for tax collection and storing goods.

The transformation of the earlier timber-and-earth stronghold into a substantial masonry residence took place at the end of the 12th century and beginning of the 13th century, particularly during the rule of Henry the Bearded who ordered the construction of a palas (palatium) and two defensive towers, now named St. Peter and St. Jadwiga. The residence was associated with Henry the Bearded and his son, Henry II the Pious, and reflected the growing political ambitions of the Silesian Piasts after Poland's fragmentation in 1138. By 1149, a chapel dedicated to Saint Benedict already existed on the mount.

=== Stone residence (12th-15th century) ===
Throughout the Middle Ages, the castle was continuously expanded by successive Piast monarchs. In 1172, during the rebellion of Jarosław, Duke of Opole, the castle burned down. A significant addition was a twelve-sided Romanesque chapel, constructed near the palas in the 1220s during reconstruction. The castle gradually developed from a compendium of separate buildings into a more unified fortified residence with a governing castellan. For several centuries, it functioned as the principal seat of the Dukes of Legnica (Liegnitz) and Brzeg (Brieg), and remained an important centre of regional authority.

In 1241, during the First Mongol invasion of Poland, the besieged castle successfully repelled the Mongol attack.

=== Gothic castle (15th century) ===
At the beginning of the 15th century, Duke Louis II led the modernisation effort and sponsored a master builder from Saint-Denis in France, who made considerable changes to the castle. After 1460, the Romanesque residence was transformed into a brick Gothic fortress, with flamboyant architectural features. The towers were also raised and strengthened.

=== Renaissance period (16th-17th century) ===
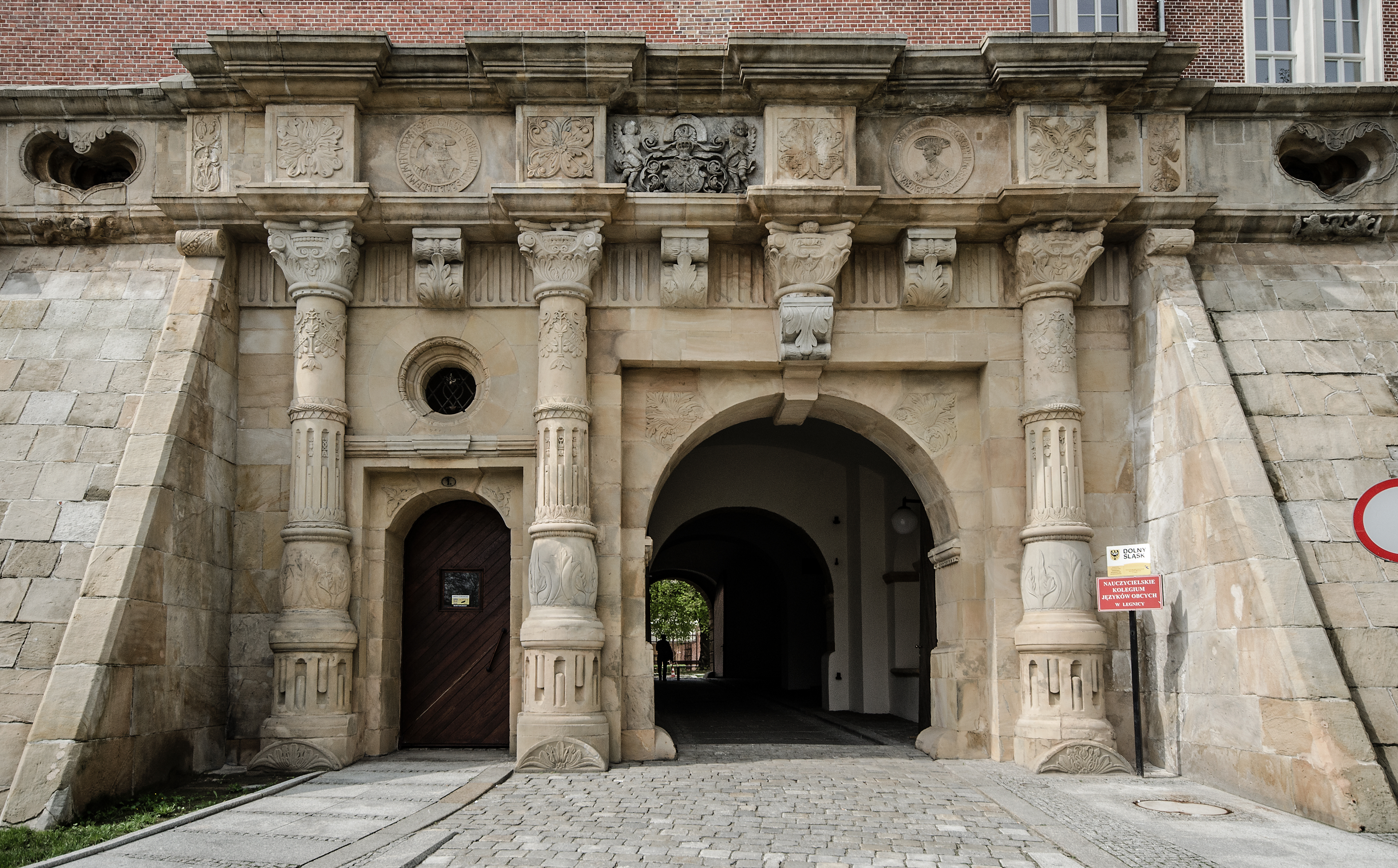
An original 16th-century gateway with the reliefs of Duke Frederick II and his wife, Duchess Sophie, with coat of arms.

A major transformation occurred during the reign of Duke Frederick II in the 1530s. The medieval residence was substantially reconstructed in the Renaissance style, with new residential and defensive structures surrounding an internal courtyard. The castle was organised into a more regular quadrangular complex strengthened by four corner bastions. Much of the stone was reused from a nearby demolished church. The Renaissance entrance gate, decorated with sculptural elements and reliefs of Frederick II and his wife, Sophie of Brandenburg-Ansbach-Kulmbach, remains one of the most significant surviving features of this period.

Parts of the medieval complex were demolished under George Rudolf, while new wings were constructed around the courtyard. In 1621, the Romanesque chapel was demolished, although archaeological remains of the structure survive on the site. The castle continued to function as a princely residence until 1675, when the death of Duke George William brought the Legnica-Brzeg line of the Silesian Piasts to an end. The castle subsequently passed under Habsburg administration.

=== German rule (18th, 19th, 20th century) ===
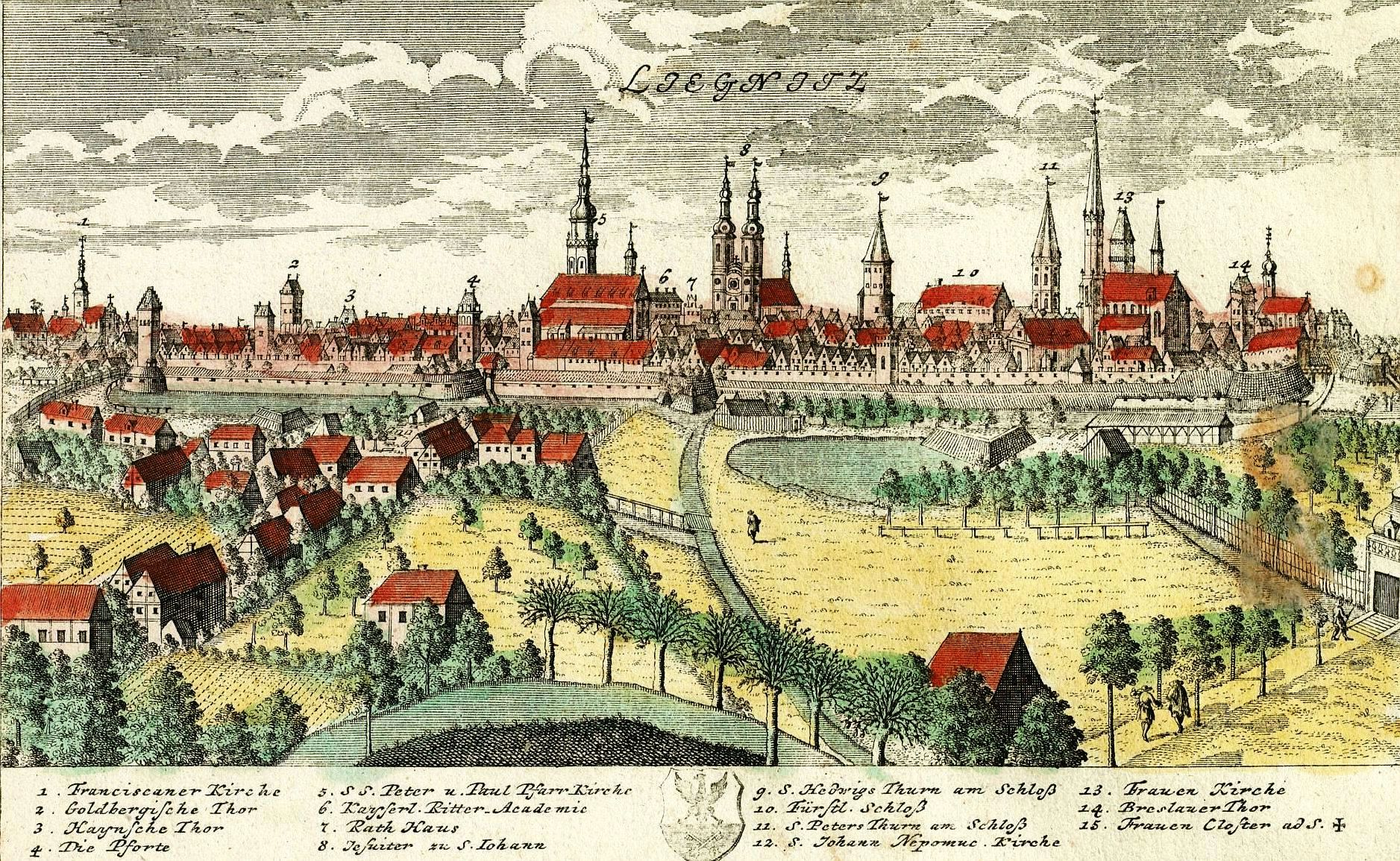
View of Liegnitz (Legnica) in 1738; the castle and towers are marked as 9, 10 and 11.

In the 18th century, Legnica became involved in the conflicts between Habsburg Austria and the Kingdom of Prussia over Silesia. After Prussia gained control of the region following the First Silesian War, the castle’s defensive character was reduced. In 1764, Frederick the Great ordered the demolition of the castle fortifications, and in 1793 the moat was filled and the drawbridge was removed. A major fire in 1711 had already caused extensive destruction and led to the remodelling in a Baroque form. A second and third fire in 1835 and 1840 respectively resulted in another extensive reconstruction, this time incorporating Neo-Gothic architectural elements such as battlements and crenels, and Renaissance Revival gables to the arsenal. One of Prussia's finest architects, Karl Friedrich Schinkel, was the architectural advisor on the project. The mount subsequently accommodated administrative institutions of the German Empire for the Liegnitz Province.

=== Second World War (1945) ===
Unlike other Silesian cities, Liegnitz suffered relatively limited destruction throughout the Second World War. However, much of the subsequent damage occurred in the last stages of the conflict, after its capture by the Soviets who perpetrated deliberate retaliatory arson. In early May 1945, the castle was set ablaze by the Soviet Red Army as a "victory torch". The damage was extensive, amounting to approximately 70%. The surrounding buildings and tenements around the castle mount were also destroyed either during or after the war.

=== Contemporary (1945-present) ===
Under the Polish People's Republic, the castle was rebuilt in changed form and designated for a school in the 1960s. Much of the German additions from the 19th century were removed, and archeological findings were exposed for open view. At present, the building is utilised by various educational institutions. Notably, until 2015, it hosted the Foreign Language Teacher Training College.

== Gallery ==
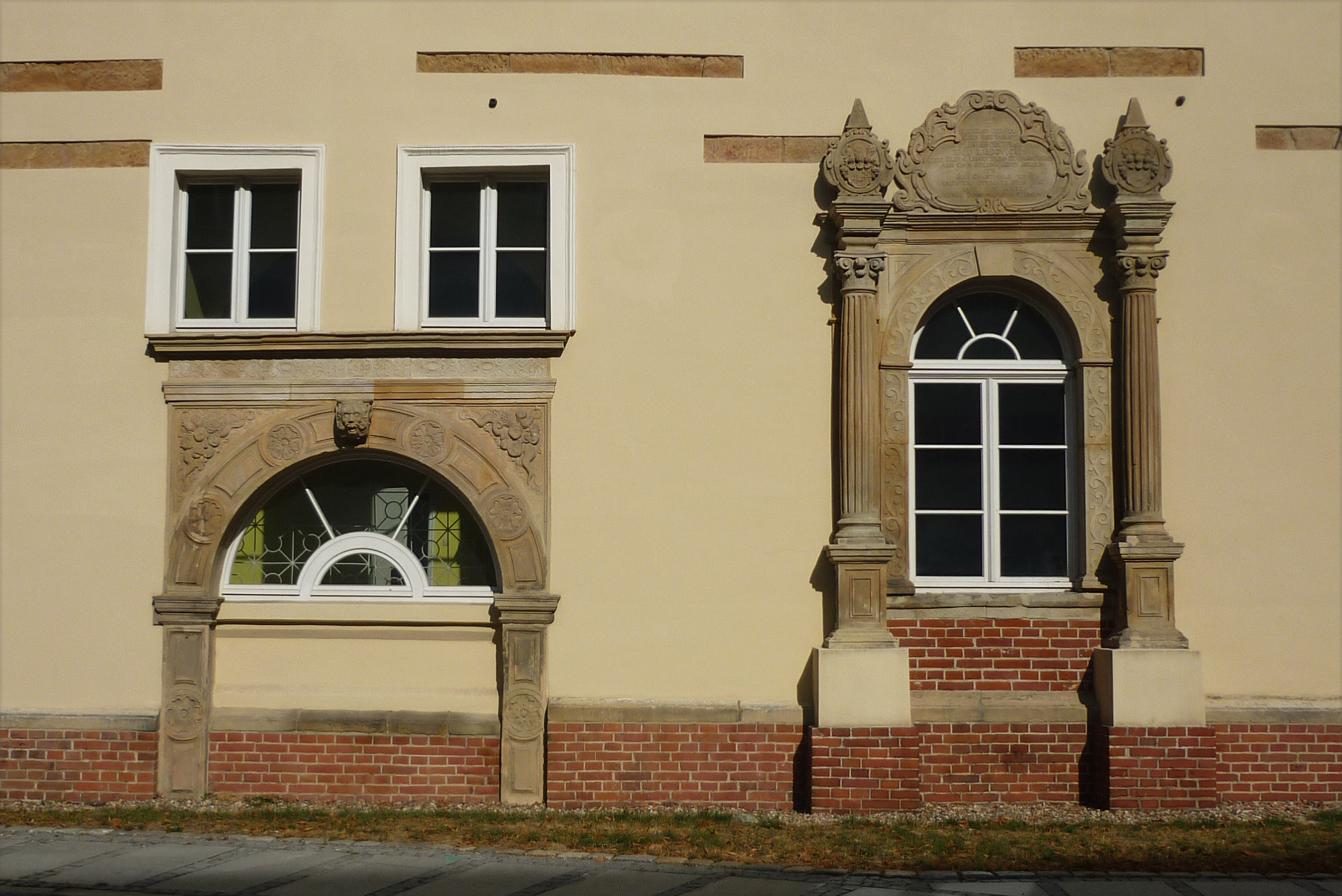
Remnants of Renaissance-era portals in the courtyard.

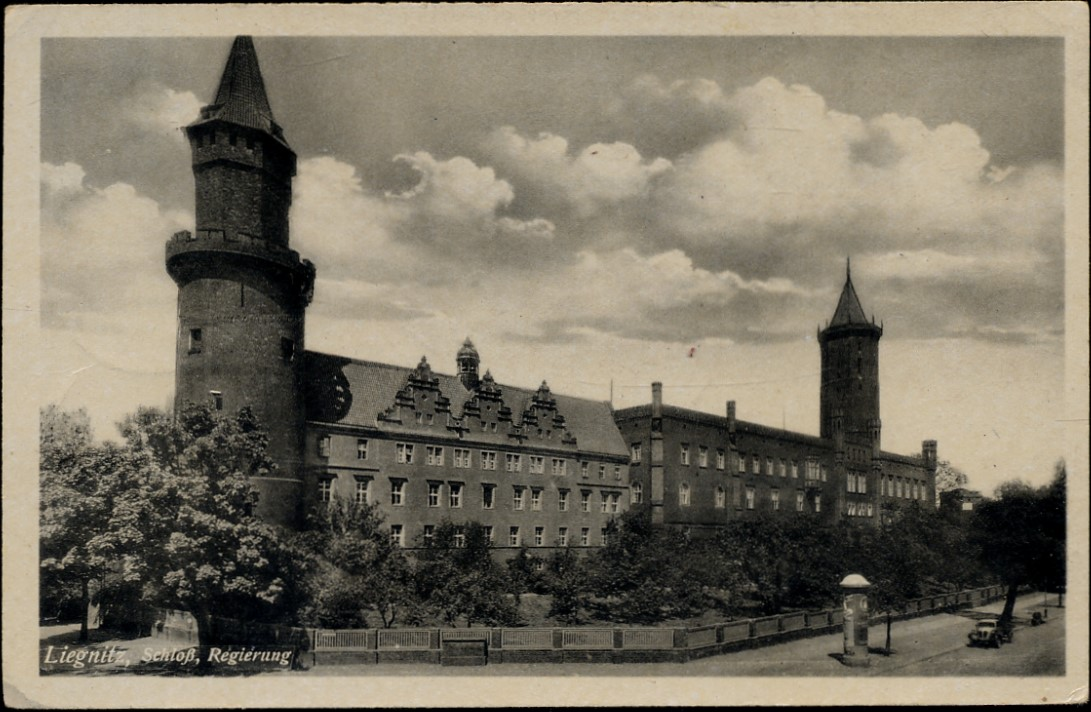
A postcard illustrating the castle in 1904.

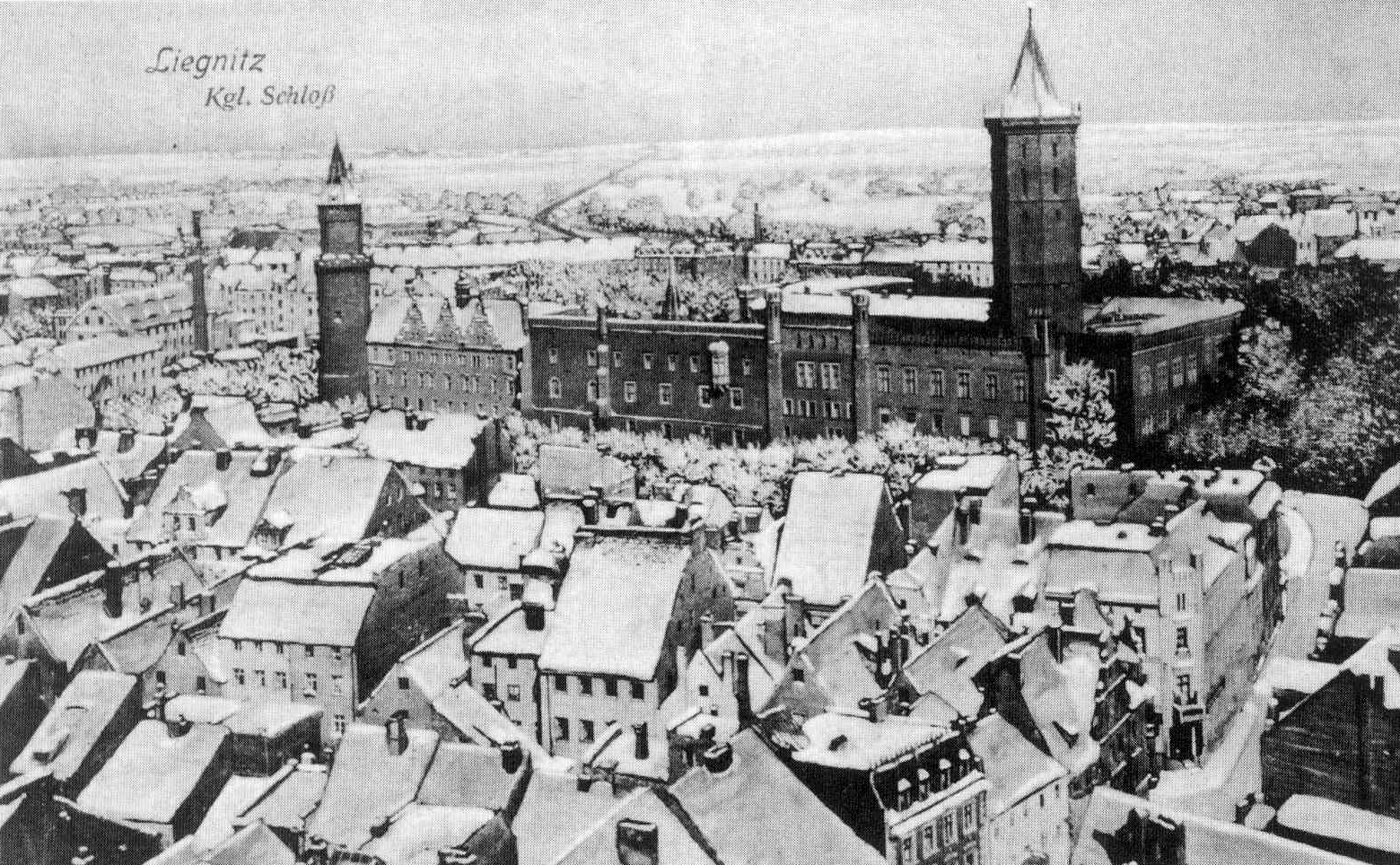
View of castle mount surroundings, all destroyed during World War II.

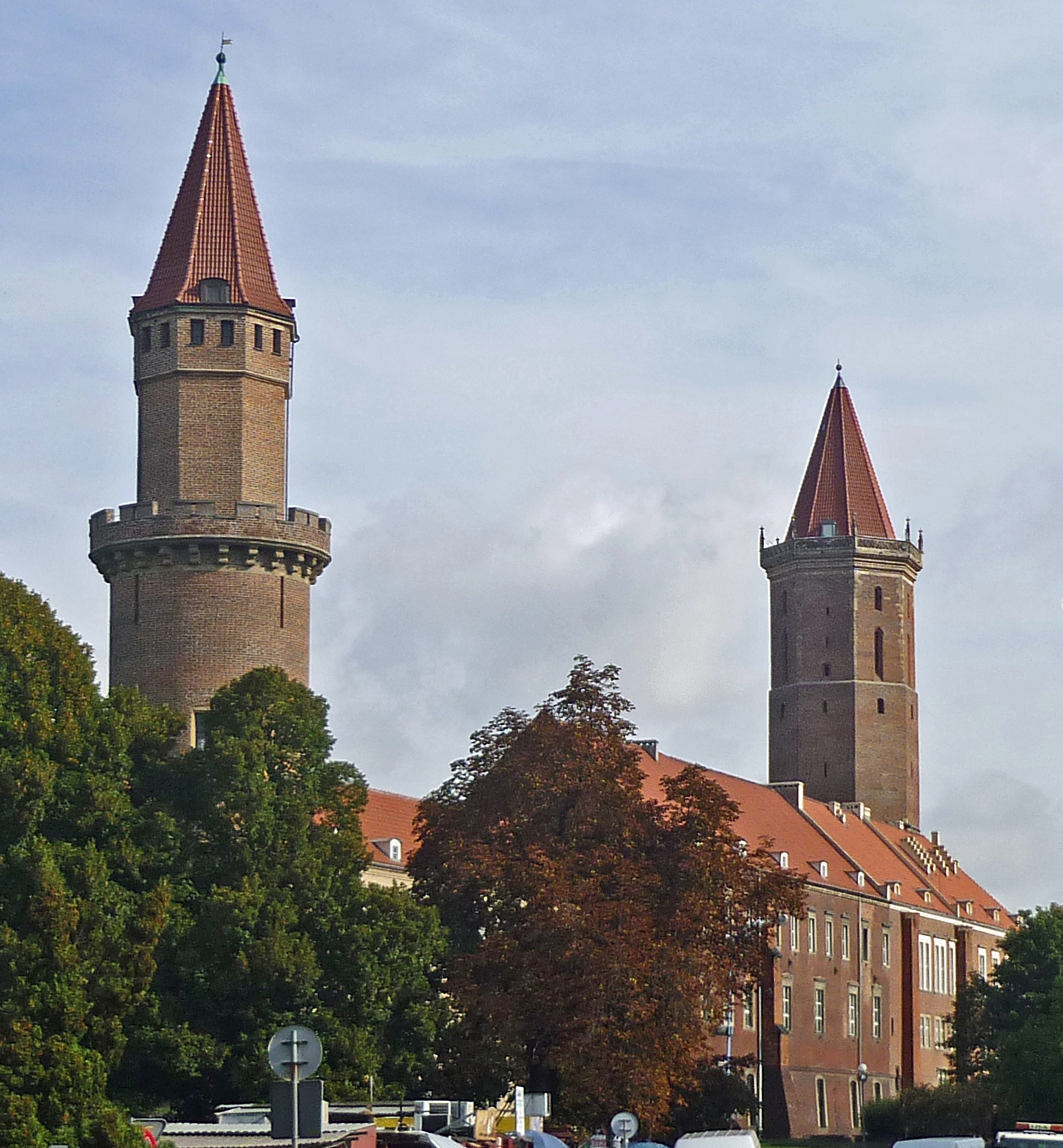
The two towers of the castle, Saint Hedwig's (left) and Saint Peter's (right).

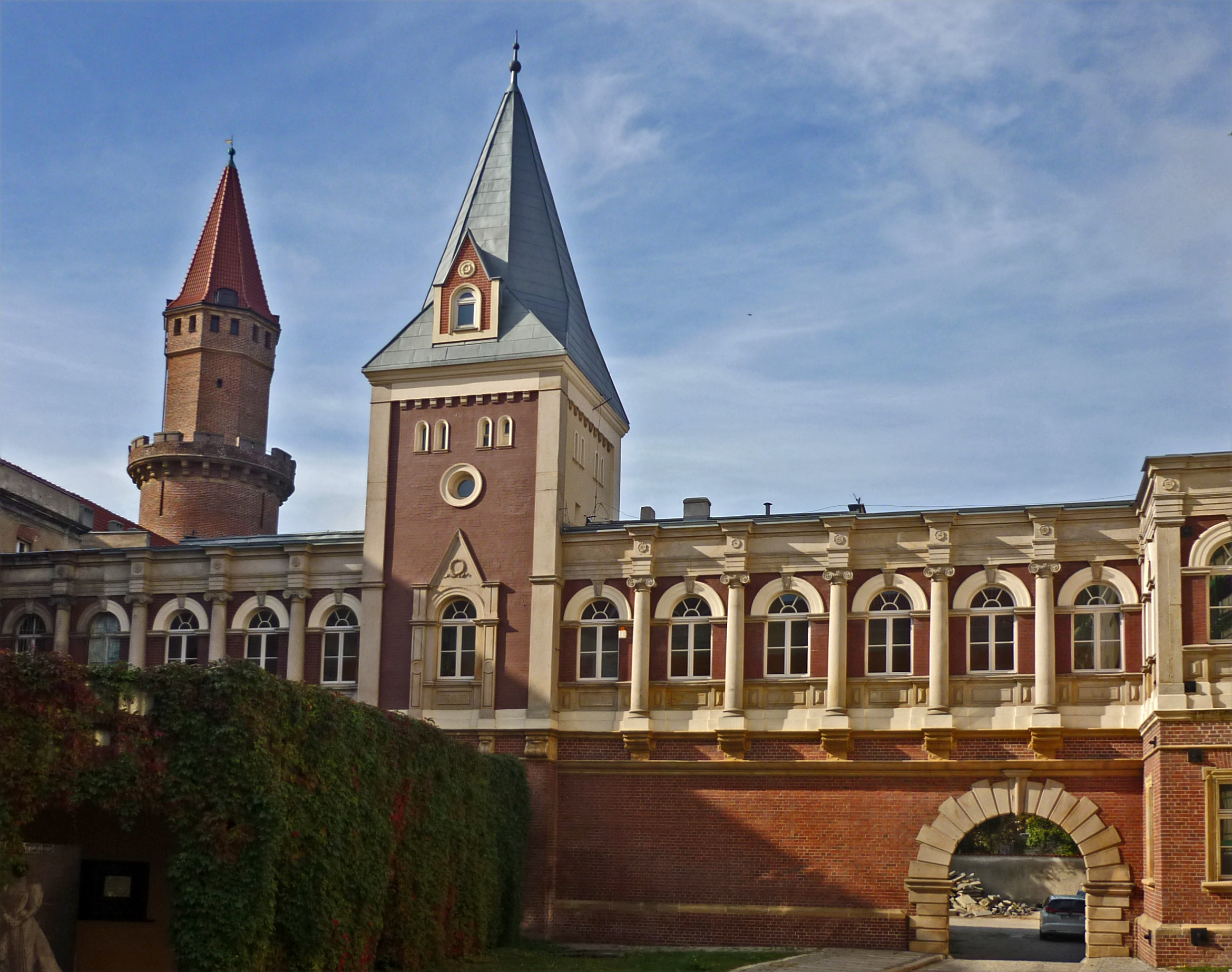
Architectural detail on the western wall.

== See also ==
- Lower Silesia
- List of castles in Poland
