= Bolesław IV of Legnica =

Polish noble

Bolesław IV
- Duke of Legnica; Prebendary of the Dioceses of Kraków and Wrocław
- Coat-of-arms of Silesian Piasts
- Born: c. 1349
- Died: 3 or 4 March 1394
- Noble family: Silesian Piasts
- Father: Wenceslaus I of Legnica
- Mother: Anna of Cieszyn

Bolesław IV of Legnica (Polish: Bolesław IV legnicki; c. 1349 – 3 or 4 March 1394) was a Duke of Legnica since 1364 (nominally; together with his brothers).

He was the third son of Wenceslaus I, Duke of Legnica by his wife Anna, daughter of Casimir I, Duke of Cieszyn.

== Life ==
After the death of his father in 1364 Bolesław and his siblings (three brothers: Rupert I, Wenceslaus II, and Henry VIII and one sister, Hedwig) were placed under the guardianship of their uncle Louis I the Fair.

Like his brothers Wenceslaus II and Henry VIII, Bolesław IV was destined to the Church since his early years, in order to prevent further divisions of the already small Duchy of Legnica. In addition, on 2 December 1372 the brothers signed an agreement which declared the indivisibility of the duchy for the next ten years. This agreement, who was gradually extended in the subsequent years, left Bolesław IV and his brothers (who were all co-rulers of Legnica) without any real power or decision in the government, who was taken totally by the elder brother Rupert I.

In 1365 and at the request of Pope Urban V, the Emperor Charles IV granted Bolesław IV with the rich Prebendary of the Dioceses of Kraków and Wrocław.

However, by 1373 Bolesław IV decided to leave his clergy career and also made his resignation over the actively government of Legnica. Released from his dynastic obligations, Bolesław IV took a greater interest in the political affairs of that time, notoriously on 6 July 1376, when he participated in the coronation of King Wenceslaus IV in Aachen.

The formal and absolut resignation of Bolesław IV and his brothers from the government of the Duchy of Legnica over their older brother Rupert I was officially confirmed on 6 January 1383 during the renewal of the homage to King Wenceslaus IV.

Bolesław IV died without issue between 3 and 4 March 1394, as a result of a fatal wound during a tournament.

== Sources ==
- This article was translated from the Polish Wikipedia version.

Preceded by Wenceslaus I	Duke of Legnica with Rupert I, Wenceslaus II, and Henry VIII; 1364–1394	Succeeded by Rupert I Wenceslaus II; Henry VIII
