= Rupert I of Legnica =

- Duke of Legnica
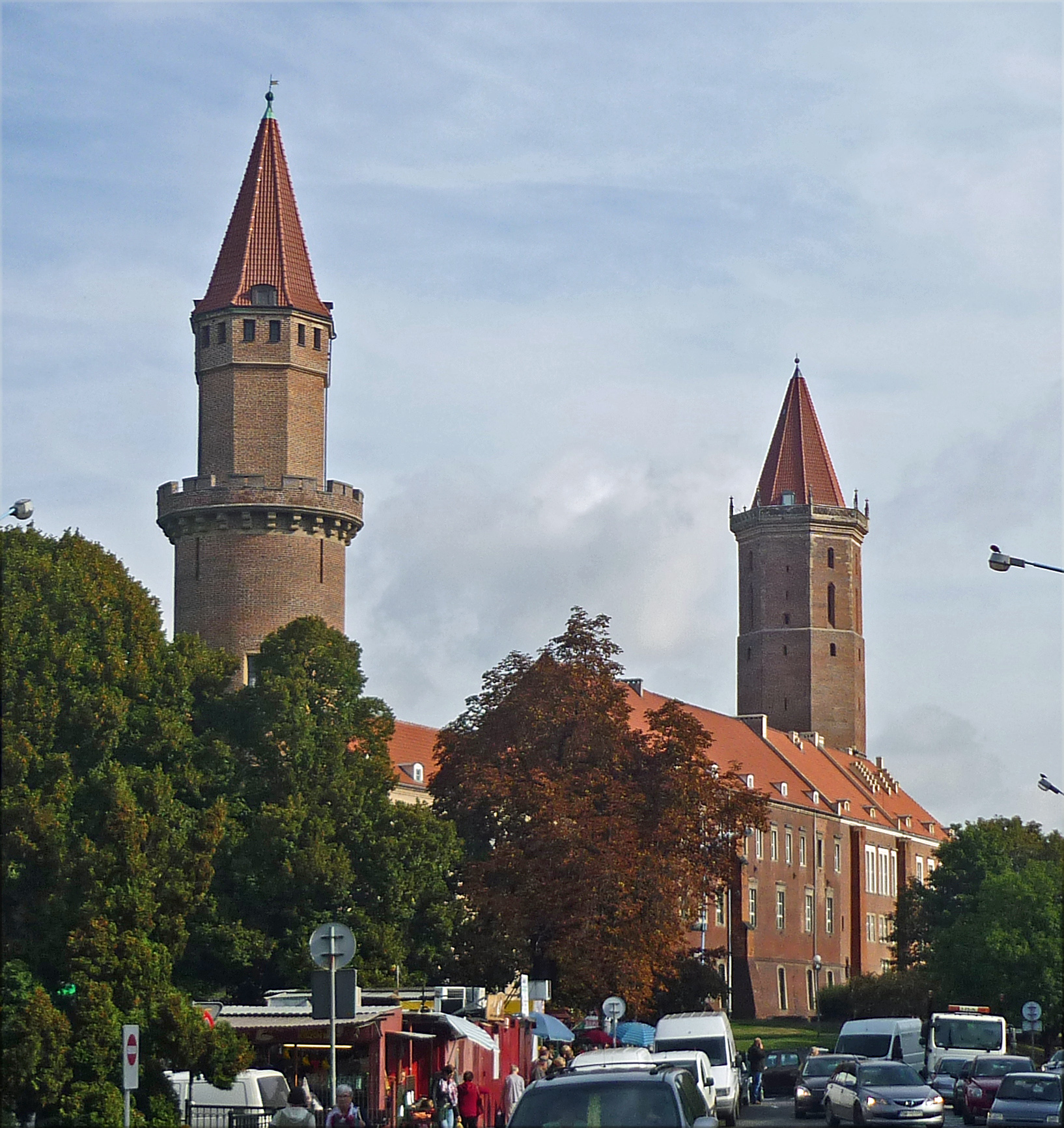
- Ducal Castle in Legnica, seat of Rupert I
- Born: 27 March 1347
- Died: c. 12 January 1409 (aged 61)
- Noble family: Silesian Piasts
- Spouse: Hedwig of Sagan
- Issue: Barbara; Agnes
- Father: Wenceslaus I of Legnica
- Mother: Anna of Cieszyn

Rupert I of Legnica (Polish: Ruprecht I Legnicki; 27 March 1347 – by 12 January 1409) was a Duke of Legnica from 1364 until his death, and also regent over half of the Duchy of Głogów-Żagań during 1397–1401.

He was the eldest son of Wenceslaus I, Duke of Legnica, by his wife Anna, daughter of Casimir I, Duke of Cieszyn. He was born after eight years of childless marriage.

== Life ==
Rupert's father died in 1364, leaving him and his four siblings under the guardianship of his uncle Louis I the Fair. One year later, with his cousin Henry VII with a Scar -Louis's son-, Rupert joined to the Emperor Charles IV's trip to be crowned King of Arles. Rupert visited then another French cities, including Avignon, where he obtained from the Pope Urban V the annulment of the excommunication over his late father.

In 1370, he participated in the Sejm Reich in Nuremberg, where for the first time, Rupert manifest his political views.

The regency of Louis I the Fair was longer: only in 1373, Rupert began his personal rule over Legnica. Despite the inclusion of his brother Wenceslaus II as a co-rule, Rupert maintain the full government over the Duchy, but always with the close cooperation of his uncle. Thanks to the pressure of Louis, Rupert signed an agreement with his younger brothers on 2 December 1372, under which they accepted not divided the Duchy of Legnica between them for the next ten years. The agreement was extended in subsequent years and allowed Rupert to exercise full control over Legnica at expense of his younger brothers, who, although they are co-rulers, none of them had any real power.

In later years, Rupert was actively involved in the dynastic struggles over the Silesian inheritance. On 21 May 1379, was concluded a treaty between Rupert and King Wenceslaus IV, who stipulated that after Rupert's homage to Wenceslaus as his vassal, the King guaranteed his total possession over the inheritance of all the descendants of Bolesław III the Generous. On 6 January 1383, Rupert had to give up his claims over the Duchies of Wrocław, Schweidnitz and Jawor.

After the death of Henry VIII the Sparrow, Duke of Głogów-Żagań on 14 March 1397, Rupert took the regency on behalf of his minor sons, until 1401.

The successive deaths of Louis I the Fair (6 December 1398) and his son Henry VII (11 July 1399) left Rupert as the Head of the Silesian Legnica-Brieg branch, who allowed him to act as a mediator in the disputes of his Silesian relatives (for example in 1399 between the Dukes of Opole and the Bishop of Lubusz, Jan Borschnitzem, and in 1400, with the sons of Henry VII, who wanted to share their dominions).

In the internal politics, the two main problems of Rupert was to pay the debts of both father and grandfather (who were successfully cancelled) and avoid problems with the Church (who was finally ended with the election of his younger brother Wenceslaus II as Bishop of Wrocław).

Like his uncle Louis I, Rupert was a generous protector of the arts. One of the artist supported by him was the Brieg canon Piotr Byczyny, who write the "Chronicles of Polish Dukes".

Rupert died around 12 January 1409 and was buried in the Church of God (pl: Bożego Grobu) of Legnica.

== Marriage and issue ==
By 10 February 1372, Rupert married with Hedwig (c. 1350 – 27 March 1390), daughter of Henry V the Iron, Duke of Żagań and widow of King Casimir III the Great of Poland. They had two daughters:

1. Barbara (c. 1384 – Trebitz, 9 May 1436), married on 6 March 1396 to Rudolph III, Duke of Saxe-Wittenberg and Elector of Saxony. Through this union, Rupert was a direct ancestor of the Kings of Denmark and the House of Gonzaga, rulers of Mantua and Montferrato.
2. Agnes (before 1385 – after 7 July 1411), a nun in Wrocław.

Preceded by Wenceslaus I	Duke of Legnica; 1364–1409; With: Wenceslaus II, Bolesław IV (until 1394) and Henry VIII (until 1398)	Succeeded by Wenceslaus II
