= Duchy of Brzeg =

Silesian duchy (1311–1675)

Coordinates: 50°51′39″N 17°28′15″E

Duchy of Brzeg Księstwo Brzeskie (Polish) Herzogtum Brieg (German) Břežské knížectví (Czech) Ducatus Briegensis (Latin)
- 1311–1675/1742
- Coat of arms

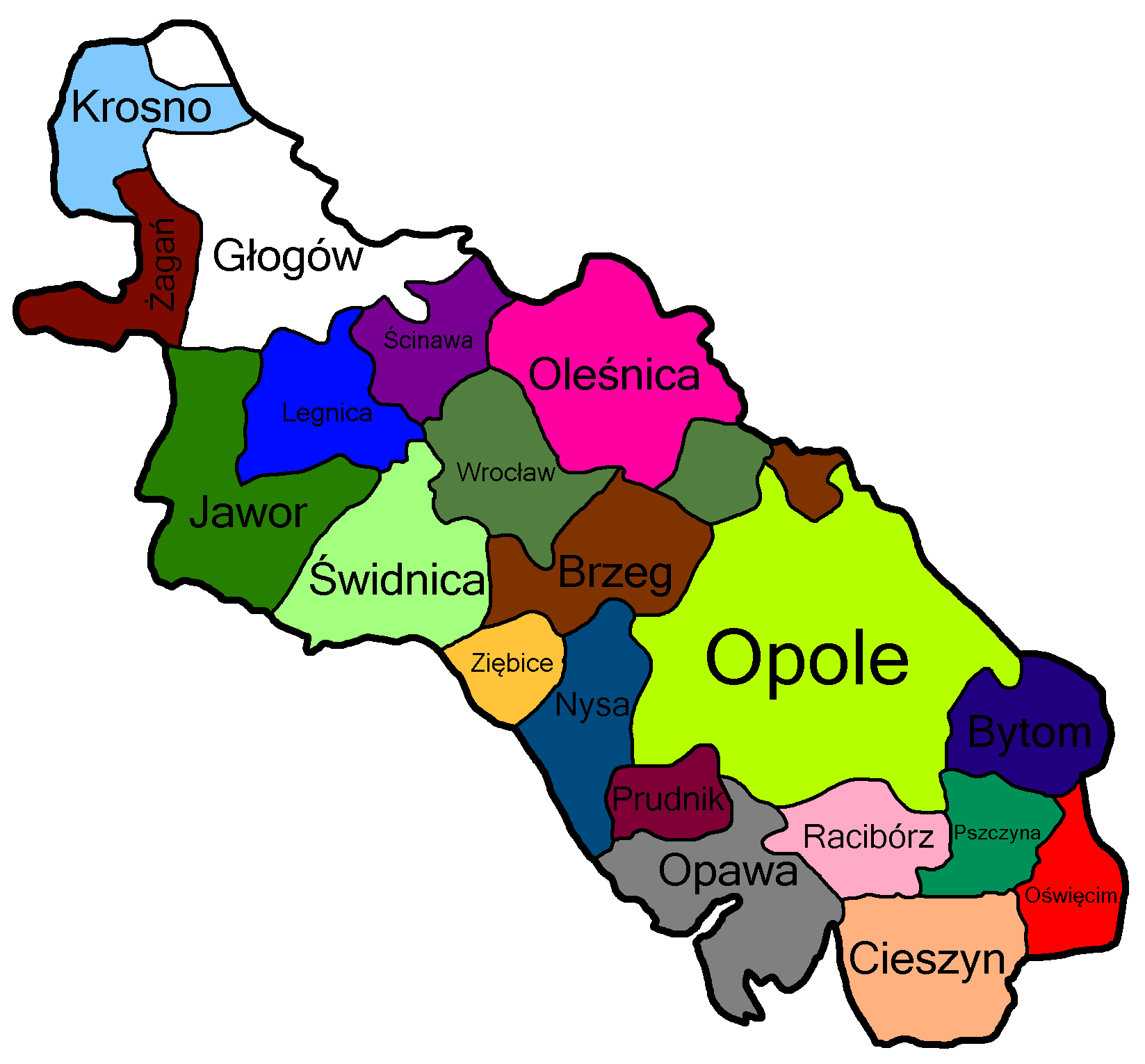
- Duchy of Brzeg Silesian duchies 1312–17

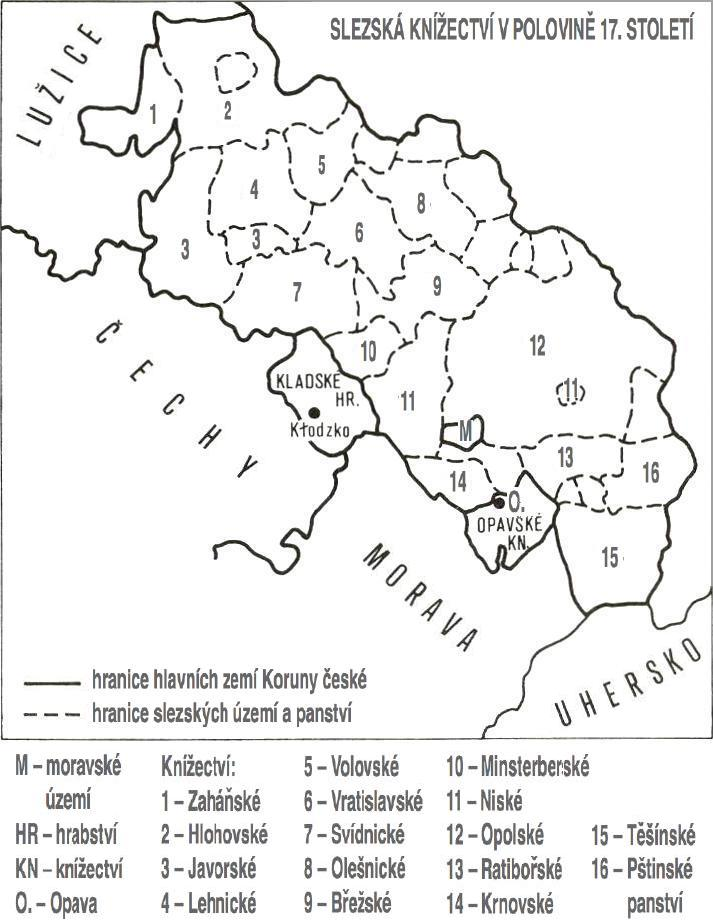
- The Principality of Brzeg has number 9 on the map
- Status: Silesian duchy Fiefdom of Bohemia (since 1329); Part of the Bohemian Crown (since 1348)
- Capital: Brzeg
- Historical era: Middle Ages; Early modern period
  - Partitioned from Legnica: 1311
  - Vassalized by Bohemia: 1329
  - Inheritance treaty with Brandenburg: 1537
  - Direct royal rule (Habsburgs): 1675
  - Annexed by Prussia: 1742
Preceded by	Succeeded by
Duchy of Legnica	Kingdom of Bohemia
- Today part of: Poland

The Duchy of Brzeg (Polish: Księstwo Brzeskie) or Duchy of Brieg (German: Herzogtum Brieg; Czech: Knížectví břežské) was one of the Duchies of Silesia, created in 1311 during the fragmentation of the Duchy of Legnica. A Bohemian fief from 1329, it was ruled by the Silesian Piasts until their extinction in 1675. Its capital was Brzeg in Lower Silesia.

== History ==
When the Piast duke Henry V of Wrocław and Legnica died in 1296, his sons and heirs were still minors and his estates were ruled by their uncle Duke Bolko I the Strict of Świdnica, succeeded by their maternal uncle King Wenceslaus II of Bohemia in 1301 and by the Wrocław bishop Henry of Wierzbno in 1305. Finally in 1311, Henry's bequests were divided among his sons: Bolesław III the Generous, the eldest brother, received the southeastern lands around Brzeg and Grodków.

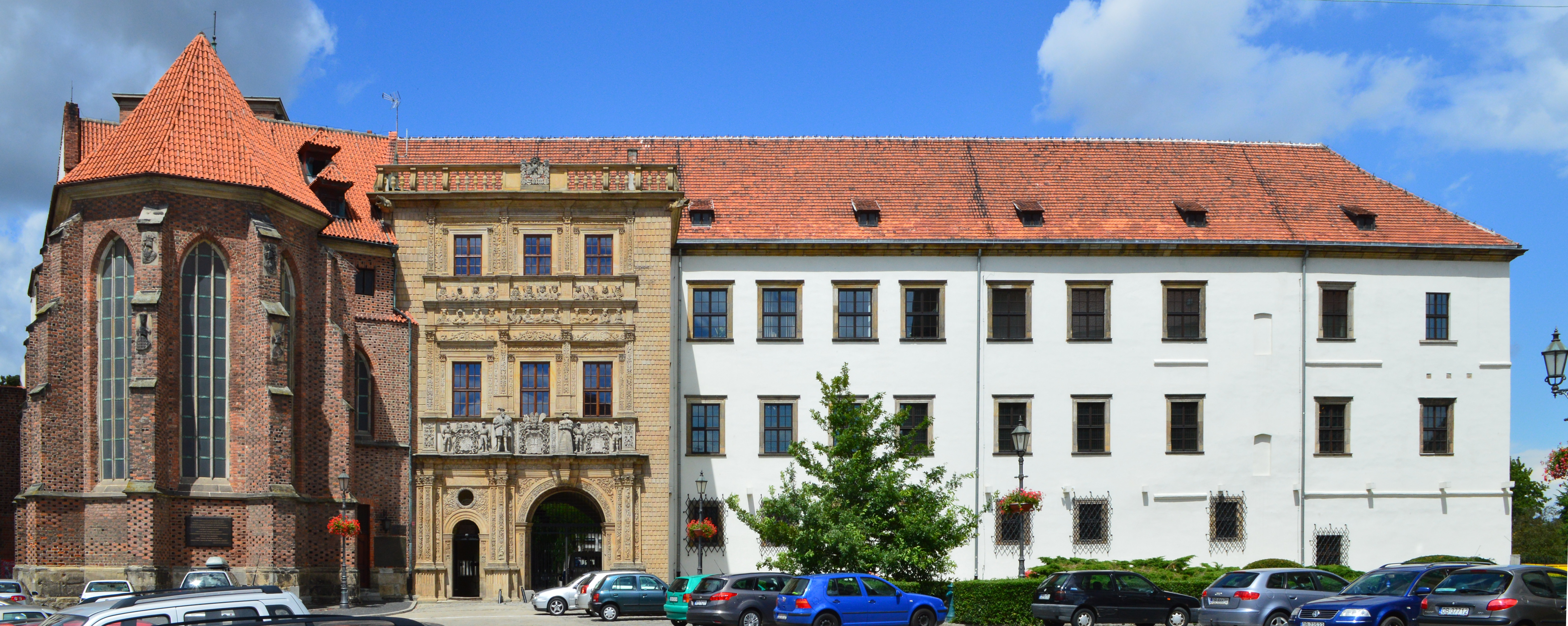
Brzeg Castle

Soon after however, Bolesław insisted on his rights as the firstborn son and ousted his younger brother Władysław from the Duchy of Legnica. He maintained good relations with his brother-in-law, the Luxembourg king John of Bohemia, and declared himself a Bohemian vassal in 1329.

The duchy was re-united with the Duchy of Legnica in 1419, then fragmented again, and united once more with Legnica under Duke Christian in 1664. When the Kingdom of Bohemia was inherited by the Habsburg dynasty of Austria in 1526, the duchy fell under their overlordship as Bohemian kings, although it was still ruled as a lien by the Silesian Piasts.

Together with Legnica and Wołów, Brzeg was the last autonomous duchy of Silesia. Following the death of the last Piast duke George William in 1675, it was administered directly by the House of Habsburg in dynasty's capacity as Kings of Bohemia.

=== Prussian inheritance claims ===
However, Brandenburg-Prussia also claimed the duchy, referring to the old inheritance treaty of 1537: in that year Duke Frederick II concluded a treaty with Elector Joachim II Hector of Brandenburg, whereby the Hohenzollern dynasty would inherit the duchy upon the extinction of the Silesian Piasts. Nevertheless, this agreement was rejected by the Bohemian king Ferdinand I of Habsburg and did not come into effect.

In 1675 the Habsburg monarchy again refused to acknowledge the validity of Piast-Hohenzollern agreement and annexed the duchies. Several decades later King Frederick II of Prussia used the dispute as a pretext to justify his campaign during the First Silesian War in 1740 which finally ended by Prussian annexation of almost nine-tenths of whole Silesia.

== See also ==
- Dukes of Silesia
