= Louis I of Brzeg =

14th-century Polish nobleman

Louis I the Fair
- Duchy of Legnica, Brzeg
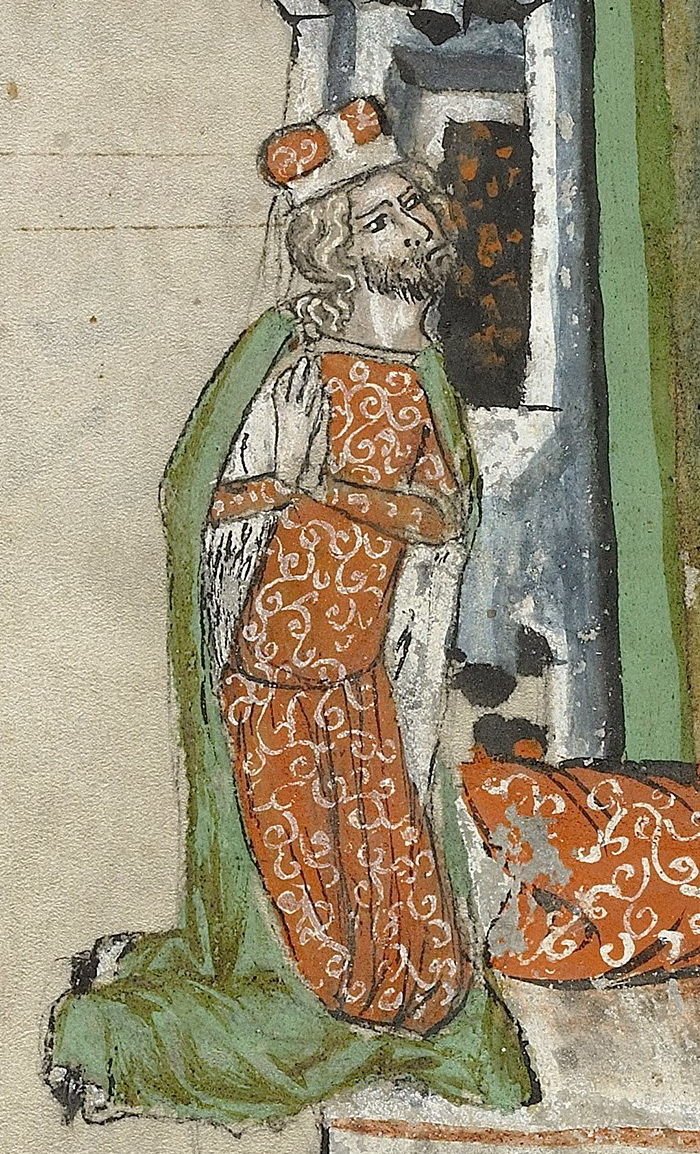
- Duke Louis praying, Hedwig Codex (1353)
- Born: c. 1321
- Died: Between 6 and 23 December 1398
- Noble family: Silesian Piasts
- Spouse: Agnes of Głogów-Żagań
- Issue: Margaret; Henry VII with a Scar; Catherine; Hedwig
- Father: Bolesław III the Generous
- Mother: Margaret of Bohemia

Louis I the Fair, also known as the Wise or the Righteous (Polish: Ludwik I Sprawiedliwy, Roztropny, or Prawy) or Louis I of Brzeg (Ludwik I brzeski; c. 1321 – 6/23 December 1398) was Duke of Legnica from 1342 to 1346 (jointly with his elder brother Wenceslaus I until 1345) and of Brzeg from 1358 until his death. A member of the Silesian Piasts, he was also regent of Legnica from 1364 to 1373.

== Life ==
Louis was the second son of the Silesian duke Bolesław III the Generous, then ruling over Legnica and Brzeg, and Přemyslid princess Margaret, a daughter of King Wenceslaus II of Bohemia. Louis was the youngest son of the ducal couple and survived to adulthood. The third and last son, Nikolaus was born and died in 1322, shortly before their mother.

Like his elder brother, little was known of Louis I's early years; his first formal appearance was in 1329 on the occasion of the renewal of his father's homage to the Luxembourg king John of Bohemia. In the following years Louis spent much of his time at the royal court in Prague. It was there that he probably learned about politics and government.

In 1342 Bolesław III's huge debts forced him to cede the Duchy of Legnica to his sons Wenceslaus and Louis, while he retired with his second wife Katarina Šubić to the Duchy of Brzeg (which also included Oława as well as Namysłów, returned to him by his eldest son Wenceslaus). During the first three years, both brothers ruled jointly without major problems until Wenceslaus, after years of childless marriage, lost all his hopes of having children and decided to give most of the Legnica territory to Louis. The formal divisionary treaty took place on 9 August 1345 in the Silesian capital Wrocław and was personally signed by King John of Bohemia. Louis I received the richest part of the Duchy and the residence in Legnica.

However, the breakdown between the brothers took place only one year later. In 1346 Wenceslaus - whose wife, after eight years of marriage was finally expecting their first child - tried to modify the treaty, under which Louis gave up all his lands to his elder brother (who apparently was dying), and in exchange, he was named his sole heir, even in the case of the birth of a son. As a temporary compensation, Louis received 400 pieces of silver per year and the possession of the palace of Byczyna.

It soon became apparent that reality was totally different. The "ill" Wenceslaus wasn't in any danger of dying. In addition, the situation was more complicated after the birth of the first of Wenceslaus's four sons, Rupert. Now Wenceslaus wanted to force his brother to renounce his succession rights, and Louis saw how his brother reduced the payment of his allowance. However, Louis's financial situation was not so bad as he was able to buy the town of Lubin from his father and move there with his family.

Between 1349 and 1350 Louis took part in a pilgrimage to Rome. After the death of his father Bolesław III in 1352, Louis opted for a military solution to the conflicts with his brother. The war lasted for nearly six years (with interruptions thanks to the mediation attempts of Duke Konrad I of Oleśnica, of the Bishop of Wrocław, Preczlaw of Pogarell and Emperor Charles IV himself). The final agreement concluded between the brothers was signed on 23 July 1359. The winner in the conflict was Louis, who in addition to the confirmation of his government over Lubin, obtained from Wenceslas I the town of Chojnów, half of the Oława territory, the Duchy of Brzeg and a monetary compensation of 4,500 pieces of silver. For his part, Louis promised to pay half of his late father's debts and formally renounced all claim over the Duchy of Legnica.

Wenceslaus died on 2 June 1364, leaving four underage sons. Louis took the regency on behalf of his nephews until 1373 (initially he shared the regency with his sister-in-law, Anna of Teschen, until 1367). From the beginning of his regency, he made significant efforts to save the Legnica treasury and to eliminate the specter of bankruptcy. His talent in government affairs caused Louis I to be actively involved in the rule of Legnica by the request of his eldest nephew Rupert I, who followed most of his advice.

Thanks to the great improvement of the Legnica finances, Louis I was able to retake the half of the Duchy of Brzeg-Oława lost by his late brother (in 1368) and also acquired the towns of Kluczbork, Byczyna, Wołczyn (in 1373) and Niemcza (years 1392–1395).

In order to maintain his sole authority over his lands, despite the attainment of majority of his eldest son Henry VII, Louis I didn't give him a separate state, and only named him co-regent – but without any real power – in 1360 or 1361. Henry VII received his own district only in 1395 (at the age of 52 years): Niemcza, purchased by his father three years before.

Louis I participated actively in foreign politics. On 21 May 1379, with his brother Wenceslaus I, he renewed his homage to King Wenceslaus IV. In exchange, the King promised the succession to the whole Duchy of Legnica-Brzeg only to the descendants of Bolesław III the Generous from then on, which saved this line of the House of Piast from further intrusions by their relatives. A second renewal of homage took place on 6 January 1383, but this time Louis I had to renounce any claims over the duchies whose current holders were relatives of the King of Bohemia: Wrocław, Schweidnitz and Jawor.

On 12 June 1397, Louis took part in the Congress of Łubnice, at which were present, among others, King Władysław II Jagiełło and Przemyslaus I Noszak, Duke of Cieszyn.

The dynastic politics of Louis I had also a good result. He managed to orchestrate the marriages of his oldest daughter Margaret to Albert I of Bavaria, son of Emperor Louis IV and his only son Henry VII (then a long-time widower) to Margaret of Masovia, widow of Casimir IV, Duke of Pomerania; also he arranged the marriage of his nephew Rupert I to Hedwig of Żagań, widow of King Casimir III the Great. Louis I expected that with these marriages he would have additional arguments to fight for the Polish throne after the death of King Casimir III. Very quickly it became clear that the prospects for the throne of Kraków were very distant. Finally, in 1396 he made an alliance with the new ruler of Poland, Władysław II Jagiełło against Władysław Opolczyk.

The reputation of the Duke of Brzeg was so great that Louis I had been repeatedly appointed by Charles IV and Wenceslaus IV as a mediator in disputes (as in 1365 between the Bishop Przecław von Pogarell and Duke Conrad I of Oleśnica, in 1367 between the sons of Duke Nicholas II of Troppau for the division of the Duchy or in 1373 between Duke Conrad II of Oleśnica and Przemyslaw I Noszak for the Duchy of Bytom).

Louis I, during his long government, was known as a founder of a number of laic and religious buildings (such as castles in Lubin and Brzeg with their respective Chapels and the Kolegiata Chapter in Brzeg). At this time the Kodeks lubiński was also made, which illustrated the life of his great-grandmother St. Hedwig of Andechs, whose cult he promoted throughout all his reign.

Louis I died between 6 and 23 December 1398 and was buried in the collegiate church of St Hedwig in Brzeg.

== Marriage and issue ==
Around 1341, Louis married Agnes (b. c. 1321 – d. 7 July 1362), daughter of Duke Henry IV of Głogów-Żagań and widow of Duke Leszek of Racibórz. They had six children:

1. Margaret (b. 1342/43 – d. 18/22 February 1386), married aft. 19 July 1353 to Albert I, Duke of Bavaria
2. Henry VII with a Scar (b. 1343/45 – d. 11 July 1399)
3. Catherine (b. c. 1344 – d. 10 April 1404/4 October 1405?), Abbess of Trebnitz (1372)
4. Hedwig (b. 1346 – d. c. 30 January 1385), married ca. 1366 to Jan II, Duke of Oświęcim
5. Wenceslaus (b. c. 1350 – d. aft. 15 September 1358)
6. A daughter (b. bef. July 1351 – d. young).

== Sources ==
- Czechowicz, Bogusław (2021). "Sources and Ways of Wrocław's Promotion in the Structures of the Bohemian Crown in the Luxembourg Era: Polemic Recapitulation". The City and History. 10 (2): 6–36. doi:10.33542/CAH2021-2-01.

Louis I of Brzeg House of Piast Born: circa 1321 Died: 6/23 December 1398
Preceded by Bolesław III the Generous	Duke of Legnica with Wenceslaus I (until 1345); 1342–1346	Succeeded by Wenceslaus I
Preceded by Wenceslaus I	Duke of Brzeg (1/2) with Henry VII (since 1361); 1358–1368	Succeeded by Reunification of the Duchy
Preceded by Bolko II the Small	Duke of Brzeg (1/2); 1368	Succeeded by Reunification of the Duchy
Preceded by —	Duke of Brzeg with Henry VII; 1368–1398	Succeeded by Henry VII with a Scar
