= Henry V of Legnica =

13th-century Duke of Jawor and Legnica

Henry V "the Fat"
- Duke of Jawor, Legnica, Wrocław
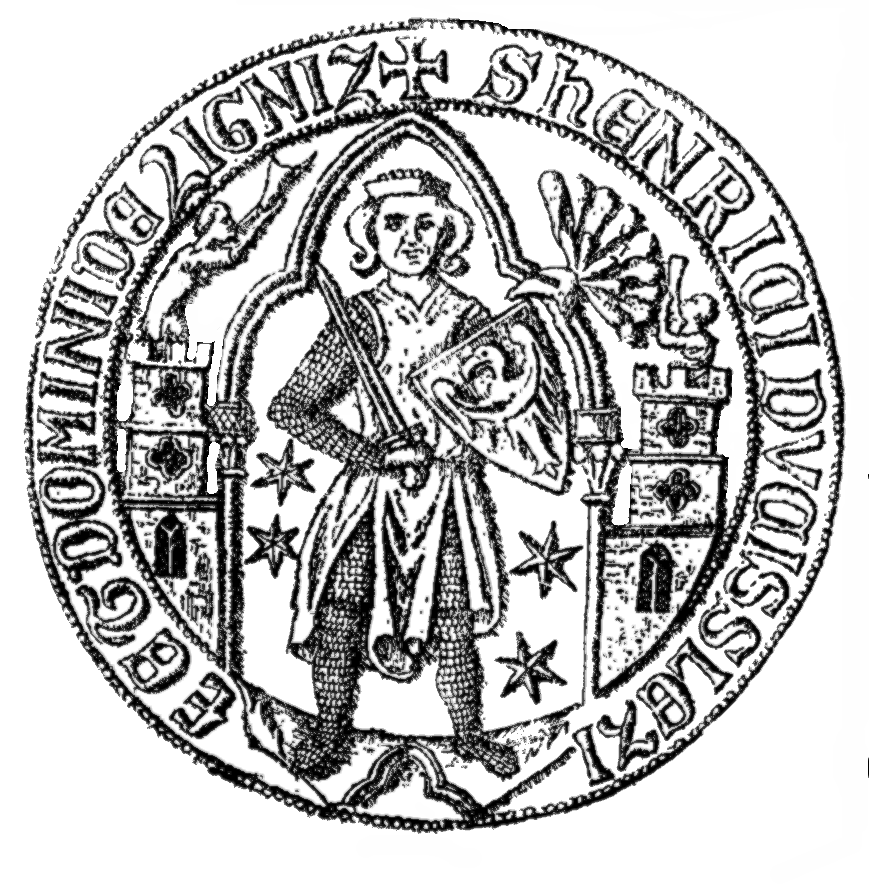
- Henry V's seal, dated to 1289
- Born: c. 1248
- Died: 22 February 1296 (aged 47–48)
- Buried: Poor Clares monastery in Wrocław
- Noble family: Silesian Piasts
- Spouse: Elisabeth of Greater Poland
- Issue: Hedwig; Euphemia; Anna; Elisabeth; Bolesław III the Generous; Helena; Henry VI the Good; Władysław
- Father: Bolesław II the Horned
- Mother: Hedwig of Anhalt

Henry V (Polish: Henryk, German: Heinrich; c. 1248 – 22 February 1296), called the Fat (Polish: Brzuchaty, German: der Dicke) was a Duke of Jawor from 1273, of Legnica from 1278, and Duke of Wrocław from 1290.

He was the eldest son of Bolesław II the Bald, Duke of Legnica and Hedwig, daughter of Henry I, Count of Anhalt.

== Life ==
=== Early Years. Duke of Jawor, Battle of Stolec ===
As a youth, he was present at the court of King Ottokar II of Bohemia in Prague, where he became a knight.

In 1273 Henry's father granted him the town of Jawor (Jauer) as an independent duchy. Four years later, Bolesław II the Bald, Henry's father, kidnapped his own nephew Henry IV, ruler of the Duchy of Wrocław (Breslau), on behalf of his ally, King Rudolf of Habsburg. This action provoked the indignation of Lesser Poland's nobility and Henry IV's neighbors, who then launched an expedition to free him and bring Bolesławto justice. The dukes Przemysł II of Greater Poland and Henry III of Głogów led the Greater Poland-Głogów-Wrocław Coalition in the hard-fought battle of Ząbkowice Śląskie near Stolec, one of the bloodiest of the Polish Middle Ages. While the Coalition forces overwhelmed Bolesław's forces and forced him to flee the field, young Henry's charge turned the tide of the battle and resulted in a great victory. Members of the coalition, including both dukes Przemysł II and Henry III, were captured. However, the young Duke Henry of Jauer saved his family from a disastrous defeat.

=== Death of Bolesław II the Bald. Henry V, Duke of Legnica ===
Henry became the Duke of Legnica on 26 December 1278, succeeding his father Bolesław II. He soon appointed his younger brothers Bolko I and Bernard as co-rulers of Jawor and Lwówek. In addition, Henry kept the town of Środa Śląska, which he had acquired in 1277 in exchange for the release of Henry IV.

Henry maintained hostile relations with other Piast Silesian dukes, similar to his father's reign. In 1281, at the invitation of Henry IV Probus, he attended a meeting in Sądowel. Henry IV, together with his former allies Henry III of Głogów and Przemysł II of Greater Poland, imprisoned the Duke of Legnica and demanded political concessions. Although Henry regained his freedom later, he was forced to recognize Henry IV as Duke of Wrocław (Breslau). However, King Wenceslaus II of Bohemia challenged Henry IV's sovereignty over Wrocław (Breslau).

=== Henry V, Duke of Wrocław. War with Henry III of Głogów ===
On 23 June 1290, Henry IV Probus died suddenly, possibly poisoned. He appointed Henry III of Głogów as his successor. However, the nobility and citizens of Wrocław opposed this decision, fearing that the Duke of Głogów would be a harsh ruler. As a result, Henry III fled and the people of Wrocław (Breslau) invited Henry V to assume the throne.

Henry III refused to abdicate, leading to wars where various territories changed hands. On 11 November 1293, Henry was betrayed by Lutka Zdzieszyca, the son of a Wrocław nobleman whom Henry had previously sentenced to death. Henry was subsequently imprisoned for about six months. Henry V secured his release by ceding the towns of Namysłów, Bierutów, Oleśnica, Kluczbork, Byczyna, Wołczyn, Olesno, Chojnów, with Bolesławiec and their fortifications to Henry III, paying a ransom of 30,000 pieces, and swearing to support the Duke of Głogów in all his struggles for the next five years.

During his imprisonment in Głogów, Henry's brother Bolko I was appointed regent of his territories. In 1291 Henry V granted Bolko I the towns of Świdnica (Schweidnitz), Ziębice, Ząbkowice Śląskie and Strzelin in return for his support against Henry III.

=== Death and legacy ===
Henry was imprisoned in an iron cage and fell ill after his release. His health never fully recovered. Worried about the fate of his duchy, he appealed to the Holy See for protection in 1294.

Henry died on 22 February 1296 and was buried in the convent of the Poor Clares in Wrocław (Breslau). Since his sons were minors, Henry's brother Bolko became their guardian.

== Marriage and Children ==
The black crownless eagle of the Silesian Piasts

Around 1273, Henry married Elisabeth (c. 1263 – 28 September 1304), daughter of Bolesław the Pious, Duke of Greater Poland. They had eight children:

1. Hedwig (c. 1277 – aft. 3 February 1347); married by 1289/95 to Prince Otto of Brandenburg–Salzwedel, second son of Margrave Otto V. After her husband died, she became a nun in St. Klara, Wrocław.
2. Euphemia (c. 1278 – June 1347); married in 1300 Otto III of Carinthia.
3. Anna (1284 – 2/3 October 1343); Abbess of St. Klara, Wrocław.
4. Elisabeth (c. 1290 – Nov 1357/58); Abbess of St. Klara, Wrocław.
5. Bolesław III the Generous (23 September 1291 – 21 April 1352).
6. Helena (c. 1293 – aft. 1300) nun in St. Klara, Gniezno.
7. Henry VI the Good (18 March 1294 – 24 November 1335).
8. Władysław (b. posthumously, 6 June 1296 – 13 January aft. 1352).

== Sources ==
- Górecki, Piotr (2007). A Local Society in Transition: The Henryków Book and Related Documents. Pontifical Institute of Mediaeval Studies.
- Homza, Martin (2017). Mulieres suadentes - Persuasive Women: Female Royal Saints in Medieval East. Brill.
- Menzel, Josef Joachim. Neue Deutsche Biographie (NDB). Volume 8. Duncker & Humblot, Berlin 1969, s.v. Heinrich V der Dicke, pp. 396–7 ISBN 3-7995-6341-5
- (in Polish) HENRYK V BRZUCHATY (GRUBY, TŁUSTY)
- Substantial parts of this article were translated from the version on the Polish wikipedia.

Henry V of Legnica House of Piast Born: c. 1248 Died: 22 February 1296
Preceded by Bolesław II the Bald	Duke of Jawor; 1273–1278	Succeeded by Bolko I the Strict and Bernard the Lightsome
Preceded by Bolesław II the Bald	Duke of Legnica; 1278–1296	Succeeded by Bolesław III the Generous; Henry VI the Good; Władysław
Preceded by Henry IV Probus	Duke of Wrocław; 1290–1296	Succeeded by Bolesław III the Generous; Henry VI the Good; Władysław
Preceded by Henry IV Probus	Duke of Ścinawa; 1290	Succeeded by Henry III
Preceded by Henry IV Probus	Duke of Oleśnica; 1290–1294	Succeeded by Henry III
Preceded by Henry IV Probus	Duke of Namysłów; 1290–1294	Succeeded by Henry III
Preceded by Henry IV Probus	Duke of Świdnica; 1290–1291	Succeeded by Bolko I the Strict
Preceded by Henry IV Probus	Duke of Ziębice; 1290–1291	Succeeded by Bolko I the Strict
