= Nicholas I of Troppau =

Duke of Opava (c.1255–1318)

Nicholas I
- Duke of Opava (Troppau)
- Born: c. 1255
- Died: 25 July 1318
- Noble family: Přemyslid-Opava
- Spouse: Adelheid of Habsburg
- Issue: Nicholas II, Duke of Troppau; Wenceslaus of Opava; Johann
- Father: Ottokar II of Bohemia
- Mother: Agnes of Kuenring

Nicholas I (Czech: Mikuláš I. Opavský) (c. 1255 – 25 July 1318) was the natural son of Bohemian king Ottokar II Přemysl and his mistress Agnes of Kuenring. In 1269 he became Duke of Opava (at modern day Opava, Czech Republic) and thereby the progenitor of the Silesian cadet branch of the Přemyslid dynasty that lasted until 1521.

He was legitimated by his father with the consent of Pope Alexander IV and raised at the Prague court. As his half-brother Wenceslaus II was designated to succeed his father on the Bohemian throne, Nicholas in compensation received Troppau, then a part of the Moravian march. He supported his father in the 1278 Battle on the Marchfeld, was captured by Hungarian forces, but regained his duchy from the victorious German king Rudolf of Habsburg. His rule was however challenged by Ottokar's widow Kunigunda of Halych, who had retired to Hradec nad Moravicí.

In 1283 Nicholas married King Rudolf's niece Adelheid. They had three sons:

- Nicholas II, Duke of Troppau
- Wenceslaus of Opava
- Johann (died 1325).

Nicholas retained the Duchy of Opava after the last Přemyslid ruler of Bohemia, King Wenceslaus III was killed in 1306. The Bohemian Crown however passed to Duke Henry of Carinthia and Nicholas had to accept the pledge of his duchy in favour of the Silesian Piast duke Bolesław III the Generous of Legnica, the husband of King Wenceslaus' III sister Margaret. King Henry's successor John of Bohemia however redeemed the pawn and in 1318 re-installed Nicholas's son Nicholas II as duke.

== Bibliography ==
- Veszpremy, Laszlo; Schaer, Frank, eds. (1999). Deeds of the Hungarians. Central European University Press.
- Patrick J. Geary: Readings in Medieval History, 4th Edition, University of Toronto Press, 2010
- Patrick J. Geary: Readings in Medieval History, Volume II: The Later Middle Ages,
- In Czech:
  - KOUŘIL, Pavel; PRIX, Dalibor; WIHODA, Martin. Hrady českého Slezska. Brno : Archeologický ústav AV ČR, 2000. 645 p. ISBN 80-86023-22-2.
  - STŘEŠTÍKOVÁ, Markéta. Králův syn. Dětství a jinošství Mikuláše I. Opavského. In Opava. Sborník k dějinám města 3. Opava : Matice slezská; Zemský archiv v Opavě, 2003. ISBN 80-903055-6-3. pp. 12–16.
  - WIHODA, Martin. Facta est autem distraction regni Bohemiae. Opavsko v čase interregna 1278–1283. In Acta historica et museologica Universitatis Silesianae Opaviensis. Řada C. Opava : Slezská univerzita, Filozoficko-přírodovědecká fakulta, Ústav historie a muzeologie, 2000. ISBN 80-7248-110-X. pp. 170–180.
  - WIHODA, Martin. Mikuláš I. Opavský mezi Přemyslovci a Habsburky. Český časopis historický, 2001, pp. 209–230. ISSN 0862-6111.

Preceded by New creation	Duke of Troppau; 1269–1308	Succeeded by Bolesław III
