= Elisabeth of Kalisz =

Polish noblewoman

- Born: c. 1259
- Died: 28 September 1304; Wrocław
- Noble family: Piast
- Spouse: Henry V, Duke of Legnica
- Issue: Hedwig; Euphemia; Anna; Elisabeth; Bolesław III the Generous; Helena; Henry VI the Good; Władysław
- Father: Bolesław the Pious
- Mother: Jolenta of Poland

Elisabeth of Kalisz (c. 1259 – 28 September 1304) or Elisabeth of Greater Poland, was the eldest child of Bolesław the Pious and his wife, Saint Jolenta of Poland. Her younger sister was Jadwiga of Greater Poland.

== Marriage ==
In 1273, Elisabeth married Henry V, Duke of Legnica (1248–1296), who was the son of Bolesław II the Bald and Hedwig of Anhalt.

The couple had:

1. Hedwig (b. ca. 1277 – d. aft. 3 February 1347), married by 1289–95 to Prince Otto of Brandenburg-Salzwedel, second son of Margrave Otto V. After her husband died, she became a nun in St. Klara, Wrocław.
2. Euphemia (b. ca. 1278 – d. June 1347), married in 1300 to Otto II of Görz, Duke of Carinthia. Their daughter was Elisabeth of Carinthia, through her Elisabeth and Henry were direct ancestors of the Kings of Sicily, Aragon and Castile.
3. Anna (b. 1284 – d. 2/3 October 1343), Abbess of St. Klara, Wrocław.
4. Elisabeth (b. ca. 1290 – d. Nov 1357–58), Abbess of St. Klara, Wrocław.
5. Boleslaw III the Wasteful (b. 23 September 1291 – d. 21 April 1352).
6. Helena (b. ca. 1293 – d. aft. 1300), nun in St. Klara, Gniezno.
7. Henry VI the Good (b. 18 March 1294 – d. 24 November 1335).
8. Władysław (b. posthumously, 6 June 1296 – d. 13 January aft. 1352).

Her husband went to war with Henry III, Duke of Silesia-Glogau; he was captured and imprisoned in Głogów until he was released. Henry was ill by the time of his release; this was due to the conditions of his confinement (he was locked in an iron cage).

He never recovered his health, and seems to have known that he was not going to live much longer. Fearing for the future of his Duchy, in 1294 he decided to put himself under the protection of the Holy See.

Henry died on 22 February 1296 and was buried in the Clare monastery of Wrocław. At this time, all his sons were minors, and because of this, they were put under the tutelage of his brother Bolko.

== Later life ==
Elisabeth's mother and younger sister, Anna had gone to live in a nunnery after the death of their father. Jadwiga was married to Władysław I the Elbow-high; they had many children – among them were Elizabeth of Poland and Casimir III the Great.

Elisabeth and her children went to live with Wenceslaus II of Bohemia and his family. Here, Wenceslaus and Elisabeth arranged for her son Bolesław to marry Wenceslaus' youngest daughter Margaret.

Following Bolesław's arrival in the Bohemian court and after his betrothal to Margaret, the King clearly favored him; this attitude caused fear among the closest male relatives of the King, who saw the young Duke of Legnica as a potential rival for the throne. Although the fact that Wenceslaus II had a son made him seem irrelevant, the sudden death of the King in 1305 and one year later the murder of his son and successor Wenceslaus III in Olomouc gained him an unexpected importance. Bolesław began his fight for the Bohemian throne taking the title of "haeres Regni Poloniae" (heir of the Polish Kingdom).

Bolesław and Margaret were married in 1308 and had three children. By this time, Elisabeth had died. She died on 28 September 1304 and was buried alongside her husband in the Clare monastery of Wrocław.

== Sources ==
- Homza, Martin (2017). Mulieres suadentes - Persuasive Women: Female Royal Saints in Medieval East. Brill.

== See also ==
- Piast dynasty
- Jadwiga of Greater Poland
