= Bavor =

Bavor may refer to:

- Bavor Rodovský mladší of Hustiřany, Czech nobleman and alchemist
- Bavor II (c. 1220–c. 1279), feudal ruler of Strakonice, Bohemia and Castellan of royal castle Zvíkov

== See also ==
- Bavors of Strakonice
