= Agnes, daughter of Ottokar II =

Agnes (before 1260 – after 1279) was a natural daughter of Bohemian king Ottokar II with his mistress Agnes of Kuenring.

She married Bohemian nobleman Bavor II of Strakonice. They had three children, Bavor III, Mikuláš and Vilém.

After his death she married Borsa Kàrolyi.

== Bibliography ==
- SVOBODA, Miroslav. Páni ze Strakonic : vládci Prácheňska a dobrodinci johanitů. Praha : Nakladatelství Lidové noviny, 2010. ISBN 978-80-7422-034-0.
