= Bolesław III the Generous =

Duke of Legnica, Brzeg and Wrocław (1291–1352)

Boleslaw III the Wasteful
- Duke of Legnica, Brzeg, Wrocław
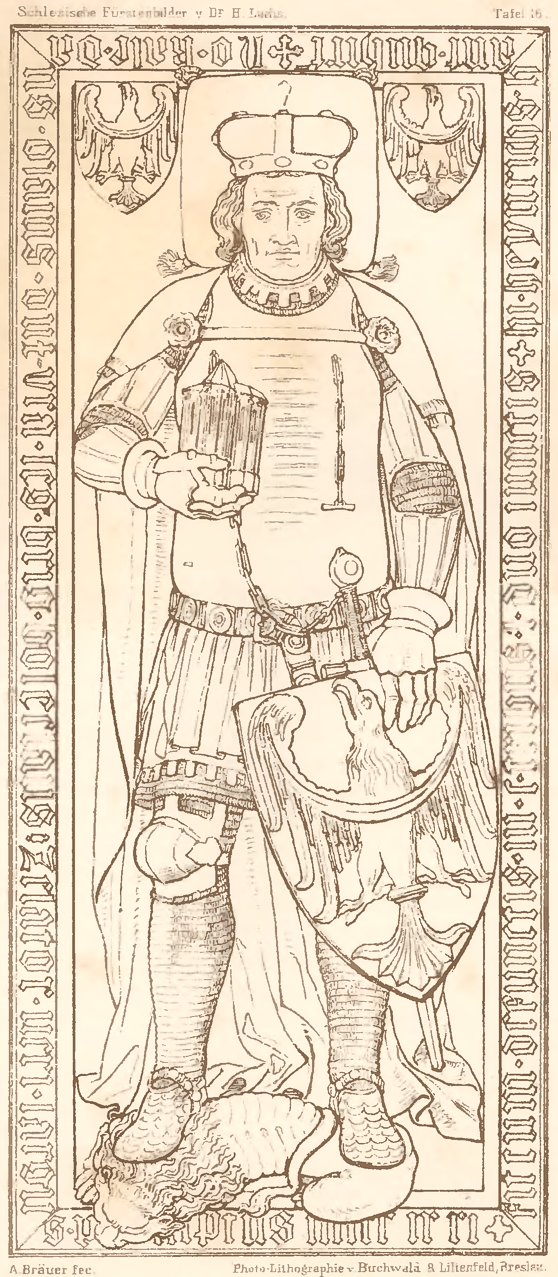
- Bolesław III's tomb in Lubiąż
- Born: 23 September 1291
- Died: 21 April 1352 (aged 60); Brieg
- Noble family: Silesian Piasts
- Spouses: Margaret of Bohemia; Katharina Šubić of Croatia
- Issue: Wenceslaus I Louis I the Fair
- Father: Henry V the Fat
- Mother: Elisabeth of Greater Poland

Boleslaw III (23 September 1291 – 21 April 1352), called the Generous (Polish: Hojny) and the Wasteful (Polish: Rozrzutny) was Duke of Legnica and Brzeg from 1296 until 1342, and Duke of Wrocław from 1296 to 1311.

He was the eldest son of Henry V the Fat, Duke of Legnica and Wrocław, by his wife Elisabeth, daughter of Bolesław the Pious, Duke of Greater Poland.

== Life ==
Bolesław's father died in 1296 when he was only five years old. His mother, the Duchess Elisabeth and his paternal uncle Bolko I became Regents. Both soon died, Bolko in 1301 and Elisabeth in 1304. Between 1301-02 the official guardianship of Henry V's sons was taken by Henry of Würben, Bishop of Wrocław, but after almost a year he was removed from this post for his alleged prodigality. By that time, King Wenceslaus II of Bohemia was determined to take advantage of the wealth and strategic location of the Duchy of Wrocław. In 1302 the young Bolesław was sent to the court of Prague and was betrothed to the seven-year-old Princess Margareta (cs: Markéta; pl: Małgorzata), the King's youngest daughter, within the year – 13 January 1303 (New Year's Day was 1 April in that era). The wedding took place five years later, in 1308.

Bolesław was clearly favored by the King, threatening the closest male relatives of the King, who saw the young Duke of Legnica (Liegnitz) as a potential rival for the throne. When King Wenceslaus II died suddenly in 1305, his son Wenceslaus III succeeded him. When Wenceslaus III was murdered one year later, in Olomouc, Bolesław began his fight for the Bohemian throne taking the title of "haeres Regni Poloniae" (heir of the Polish Kingdom).

Bolesław's forces, as Duke of Legnica-Wrocław (Liegnitz-Breslau) were inadequate to effectively compete with the other candidates for the Přemyslid throne: Rudolph III of Austria, Henry of Carinthia and John of Luxemburg. Bolesław lost his attempt to rule the Polish Kingdom after he failed to control Kalisz during 1306–1307, finally losing Kalisz to Duke Henry III of Głogów. Bolesław's only substantial gain was Opava (Troppau) in 1308 after Duke Nikolaus I surrendered to him. Bolesław then renounced his claim two years later (11 June 1311) after a treaty in Olomouc, paying 8,000 pieces of silver. Opava was then merged with the Bohemian crown and restored to Nikolaus I's son and heir, Nikolaus II, in 1318.

Bolesław's political ambitions exhausted his finances. In 1311, Bolesław was pressured into dividing his lands between his younger brothers Henry and Władysław. The Duchy was divided into three parts: Wrocław, Legnica and Brzeg (Brieg). As the eldest brother, Bolesław got first choice. He chose the smallest and least prosperous Brzeg (Brieg), surprising everyone. The monetary compensation offered by the prince who took Brieg would have allowed Bolesław to continue his fight for the Bohemian throne. Bolesław tried to regain Wrocław (Breslau) from his brother Henry VI but was unsuccessful.

Initially, Bolesław seemed to accept his fate, but one year later he managed to deprive his youngest brother Władysław from the Duchy of Legnica (Liegnitz) because Władysław wasn't able to pay his part of the monetary compensation for Brieg.

In 1312 Bolesław and Henry VI entered into an alliance with the ruler of Lesser Poland, Władysław I the Elbow-high and with their combined forces began an expeditionary trip against the Dukes of Głogów, under the pretext that the late Duke Henry III was directly responsible for the premature death of Henry V, father of the Dukes of Legnica (Liegnitz) and Wrocław (Breslau). The war lasted five years, 1312–1317. Finally Władysław I Łokietek took most of Greater Poland, his allies taking the towns of Uraz (to Henry VI), and Wołów and Lubiąż (to Bolesław).

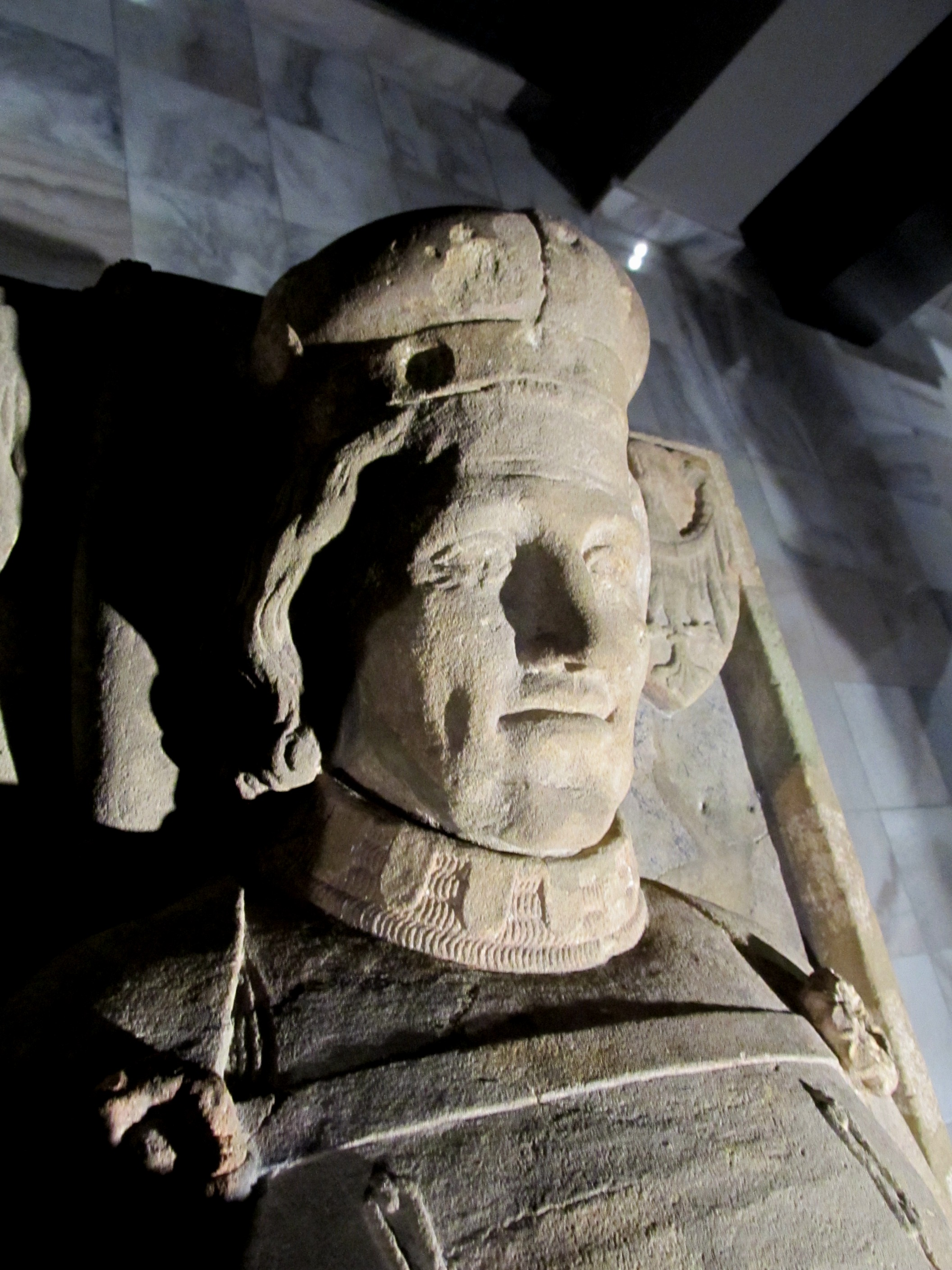
Effigy of Bolesław III the Generous in Wrocław

After this victory, Bolesław tried to reassert himself in the succession struggle for the Kingdom of Bohemia, then in the possession of John of Luxemburg. Bolesław received his reward in 1321–1322 when King John appointed him Governor of Bohemia during his trip to Germany and Italy.

In Silesia, Bolesław and his brothers Henry VI, Bolko II of Opole and Władysław I Łokietek formed a coalition and went to war against the Dukes of Głogów (Glogau) in 1321. This time they were successful, primarily due to Bolesław. On 10 August 1323, a peace treaty was signed in Wrocław (Breslau). Duke Konrad I of Oleśnica ceded the Duchy of Namysłów with the fortresses of Namysłów, Byczyna and Kluczbork.

By 1322, relations between Bolesław and his younger brother Henry VI began to deteriorate. Henry refused to support the aggressive politics of his brother when he signed a peace treaty with Konrad of Oleśnica regarding the possession of Wrocław (Breslau). Bolesław offered to exchange his district of Legnica (Liegnitz) for Wrocław (Breslau). Henry VI refused, and the war between the brothers was imminent. Henry established contacts with the new King of Poland Władysław I Łokietek, promised him homage and was named his heir in exchange for aid. Władysław declined the offer because he feared a direct confrontation with the Kingdom of Bohemia. Henry then asked the help of Emperor Louis IV. On 20 April 1324, the Duke of Wrocław declared himself a vassal of the Empire. In return, Louis IV guaranteed the succession of Henry VI's lands to his daughters, prompting Bolesław to attack. Wrocław's defenses held, and Henry VI maintained control.

In 1327 the situation changed completely. John of Luxemburg persuaded Henry VI to break his alliance with the Emperor to become a vassal of Bohemia. In exchange, he received the County of Glatz during his lifetime and a high pension, from the King.

Bolesław made a final attempt to capture Wrocław in 1327-28, during King John absence from Bohemia. Once again, he failed.

In 1329, Bolesław's youngest brother Władysław (who had been stripped of his Duchy of Legnica in 1312) unexpectedly returned to Silesia. Having been declared a vassal of Bohemia, Władysław took possession of Legnica in the name of King John, leaving Bolesław in a critical situation. Bolesław did not have the resources for a war against King John so, on 9 May 1329 in Wrocław, Bolesław declared himself a vassal of the Kingdom of Bohemia.

After losing his independence, Bolesław ceased trying to gain territories. As a vassal of John of Luxemburg, he took part during 1329-31 in King John's military expeditions to Lusatia (Lausitz) and Głogów (Glogau).

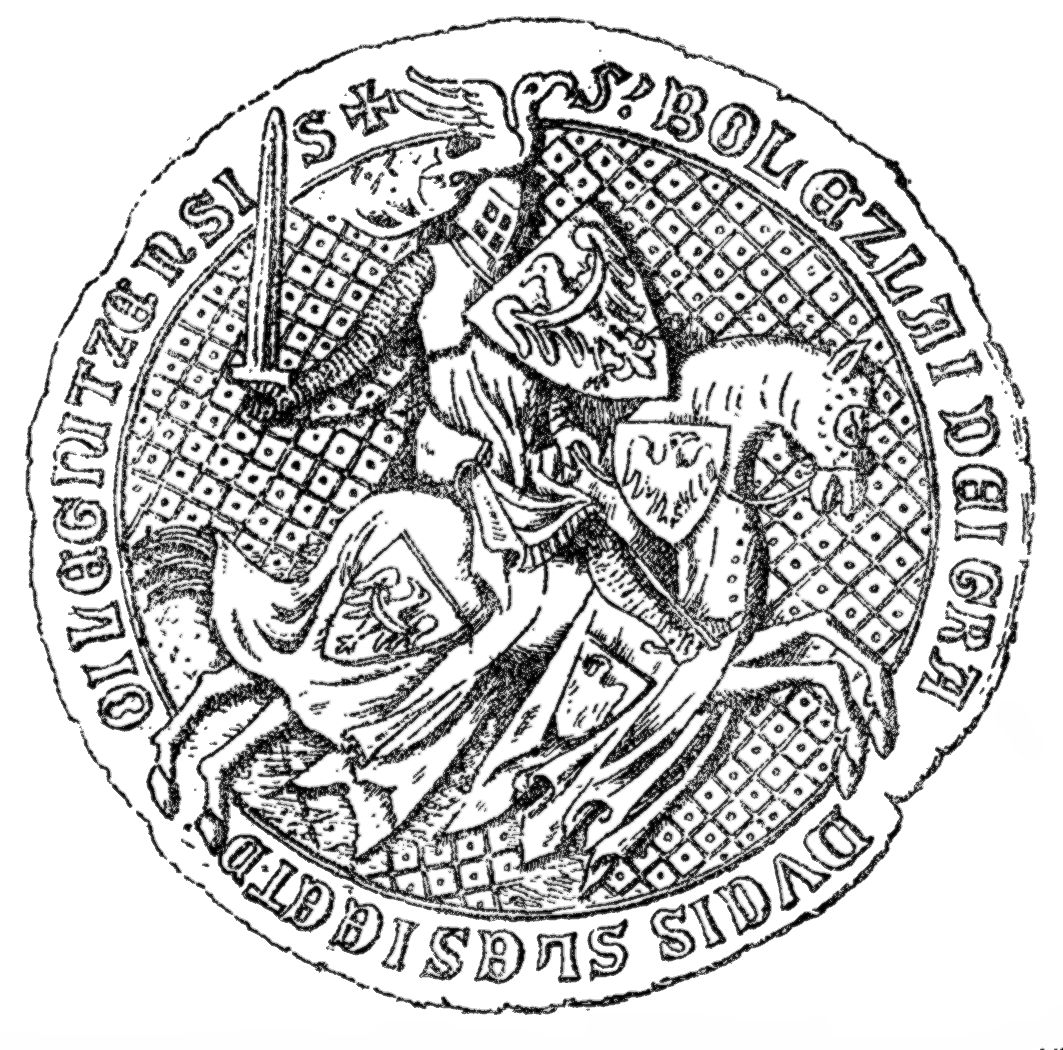
Bolesław III's seal, dated to 1337.

Bolesław's sumptuous lifestyle and constant travel (notably to the Congress of Visegrád of 1335) put him in a difficult financial situation. He continually increased taxes in his Duchy (towns of Chocianów and Chojnów).

Bolesław's oldest son Wenceslaus I rebelled against his father, claiming his part of the inheritance. The Duke didn't want a conflict with his son, and in 1338 he gave Wenceslaus the Duchy of Namysłów. Four years later (1342), he finally gave his sons Wenceslaus I and Louis I the joint government of the Duchy of Legnica. In exchange, Wenceslaus returned to Namysłów, which Bolesław almost immediately sold to King Casimir III the Great. After his abdication, Bolesław retired to Brieg with his second wife Katharina Šubić, of Croatia, to Brieg, where he remained until his death on 21 April 1352. He was buried in Lubiąż Abbey.

Although his coffers were now reduced, Bolesław didn't give up to his lavish lifestyle. He attended the marriage of King Casimir III the Great and Adelaide of Hesse in Poznań in 1341, and the coronation of Charles IV of Luxemburg, King of Bohemia, Bolesław to sell the town of Grodków to the Bishop of Wrocław, Preczlaw von Pogarell on 19 January 1344.

Bolesław was twice excommunicated by the Church: for the delay in paying the tithing in 1337, and when he sequestered Church property in 1340. The excommunication was removed on his deathbed at the insistence of his sons. Bolesław was quite generous to the Church, despite their unstable relation, contributing to Lubiąż Abbey, and founding two monasteries (Franciscan and Dominican), in Brieg.

== Marriages and Children ==
The black crownless eagle of the Silesian Piasts

In 1318, Bolesław married firstly Margareta (Markéta; b. Prague?, 21 February 1296 – d. Hradec Králové, 8 April 1322), daughter of King Wenceslaus II of Bohemia. They had:

1. Wenceslaus I (b. ca. 1318 – d. 2 June 1364)
2. Louis I the Fair (b. ca. 1321 – d. 6/23 December 1398)
3. Nikolaus (b. and d. Hradec Králové, 7 April 1322).

In 1326, Bolesław married secondly Katharina (d. bef. 5 March 1358), daughter of Mladen II Šubić, Ban of Croatia. They had no children. In his will, Bolesław left the Duchy of Brieg to his widow, who ruled until her own death.

== Source ==
- Czechowicz, Bogusław (2021). "Sources and Ways of Wrocław's Promotion in the Structures of the Bohemian Crown in the Luxembourg Era: Polemic Recapitulation". The City and History. 10 (2): 6–36. doi:10.33542/CAH2021-2-01.
- Kersken, Norbert (2021). "Poland and the Polish People in Late Medieval German Historiography". In Pleszczynski, Andrzej; Vercamer, Grischa (eds.). Germans and Poles in the Middle Ages. Brill.
- (in Polish) BOLESŁAW III ROZRZUTNY (HOJNY, SZCZODRY, SZTYLET)

Bolesław III the Generous House of Piast Born: 23 September 1291 Died: 21 April 1352
Preceded by Henry V the Fat	Duke of Wrocław with Henry VI and Władysław; 1296–1311	Succeeded by Henry VI the Good
Preceded by Henry V the Fat	Duke of Legnica with Henry VI and Władysław; 1296–1311	Succeeded by Władysław
Preceded by Henry V the Fat	Duke of Brzeg with Henry VI and Władysław (until 1311); 1296–1352	Succeeded by Katharina
Preceded by Henry III	Duke of Kalisz; 1306–1307	Succeeded by Henry III
Preceded by Nikolaus I	Duke of Opava; 1308–1311	Succeeded by John of Luxemburg
Preceded by Władysław	Duke of Legnica; 1312–1342	Succeeded by Wenceslaus I and Louis I the Fair
Preceded by Konrad I	Duke of Namysłów; 1323–1338	Succeeded by Wenceslaus I
Preceded by Wenceslaus I	Duke of Namysłów; 1342	Succeeded by Casimir III the Great
