= Margaret of Bohemia, Duchess of Wrocław =

Margaret of Bohemia
- Duchess consort of Wrocław, Legnica, Brieg, Kalisz and Troppau
- Tenure: 1308–1322
- Born: 21 February 1296; Prague, Bohemia, Holy Roman Empire
- Died: 8 April 1322 (aged 26); Hradec Králové, Bohemia
- Spouse: Bolesław III the Generous
- Issue: Wenceslaus I of Legnica; Louis I the Fair
- House: Přemyslid
- Father: Wenceslaus II of Bohemia
- Mother: Judith of Habsburg

Margaret of Bohemia (Czech: Markéta Přemyslovna, Polish: Małgorzata Przemyślidka; 21 February 1296 – 8 April 1322) was a daughter of Wenceslaus II of Bohemia and his first wife, Judith of Habsburg.

== Biography ==
In 1308, Margaret married Bolesław III the Generous. The betrothal was arranged by her father.

Since Bolesław's arrival at the Bohemian court and after his betrothal to Margaret, the King clearly favored him; this attitude caused fear between the closest male relatives of the King, who saw the young Duke of Legnica as a potential rival for the throne. Although Wenceslaus II had a son who seemed to render him irrelevant, the sudden death of the King in 1305 and one year later the murder of his son and successor Wenceslaus III in Olomouc gained him an unexpected importance. Bolesław began his fight for the Bohemian throne taking the title of "haeres Regni Poloniae" (heir of the Polish Kingdom).

The throne of Bohemia passed to Henry of Carinthia, who was married to Margaret's eldest sister, Anna of Bohemia. Henry and Anna were only on the throne for a year before Rudolf of Habsburg overthrew them. He married Elisabeth Richeza of Poland; who was Margaret's stepmother. By 1307, Rudolf had died so Henry and Anna were invited back but were still not secure. They turned their attentions to Margaret and Anna's sister Elisabeth. Elisabeth was young and unmarried, Anna and Henry wanted her to marry Otto of Löbdaburg for political reasons but Elisabeth refused. Instead, Elisabeth married John of Bohemia who overthrew Henry and Anna once and for all. They went to live in Carinthia were Anna died in 1313, childless. John and Elisabeth became King and Queen of Bohemia. They had many children – among them were Charles IV, Holy Roman Emperor and Bonne of Bohemia; by now any chances of Bolesław and Margaret becoming King and Queen of Bohemia were gone.

Margaret died one day after giving birth to her youngest child. Bolesław remarried in 1326, taking Katarina Šubić (d. bef. 5 March 1358) as his second wife.

== Issue ==
Margaret and Bolesław had three children:

1. Wenceslaus I (b. c. 1318 – d. 2 June 1364).
2. Louis I the Fair (b. c. 1321 – d. 6/23 December 1398).
3. Nikolaus (b. and d. Hradec Králové, 7 April 1322).

== See also ==
- Přemyslid dynasty
