= Henry VI the Good =

Polish noble

- Duke of Wrocław
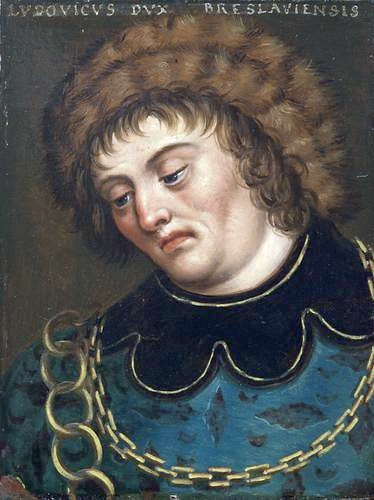
- Posthumous portrait by Anton Boys
- Born: 18 March 1294
- Died: 24 November 1335 (aged 41)
- Noble family: Silesian Piasts
- Spouse: Anna of Austria
- Issue: Elisabeth; Euphemia (Ofka); Margareta
- Father: Henry V the Fat
- Mother: Elisabeth of Greater Poland

Henry VI the Good (German: Heinrich der Gute; Polish: Henryk VI Dobry or Wrocławski; 18 March 1294 – 24 November 1335) was Duke of Wrocław from 1296, with his brothers as co-rulers until 1311. He was the second son of Henry V the Fat, Duke of Legnica and Wrocław, by his wife Elisabeth, daughter of Bolesław the Pious, Duke of Greater Poland. He died in 1335 without leaving a male heir.

== Life ==
Henry's father died in 1296, when Henry was two years old. Because he and his brothers, Bolesław III and Władysław (who was born after their father's death), were minors the regency of their lands was taken over by their mother, the Dowager Duchess Elisabeth (d. 1304) and their paternal uncle Bolko I (d. 1301). Between 1301 and 1302 the official guardianship of Henry V's sons was carried out by Henry of Wierzbna, Bishop of Wrocław. Finally the authority over the Duchy of Wrocław-Legnica was personally assumed by the King Wenceslaus II of Bohemia and Poland, which brought Bolesław III into his court in Prague. Is unknown what happened with Henry during this time.

The first mention of Henry takes place in 1310 when he married the several years older Anna, daughter of Albert I of Habsburg, the ruler of Austria. A year later, as a result of the pressure of the nobility of both Wrocław and Legnica (tired of the neglected rule of Bolesław III), the Duchy was divided into three parts: Wrocław, Legnica and Brzeg. The poorest and least important was Brzeg. In the treaty of division, it was stipulated that the brother who takes this district would also receive from the other two a payment of 50,000 fines. As the oldest, Bolesław III was able to choose first; with financial problems, he unexpectedly took Brzeg and the monetary compensation. As a result, Henry was allowed to take Wrocław. He had no problems with paying the debt to his older brother (thanks to the help of the rich Wrocław patricians) and kept the district. The youngest brother, Władysław, who received Legnica, wasn't able to pay his part of the debt and for this was expelled from his land by Bolesław III.

Between 1312 and 1317, a conflict erupted between Bolesław III and the Dukes of Głogów. Henry and his brother entered into an alliance with the ruler of Lesser Poland, Władysław I the Elbow-high and with their combined forces began an expeditionary trip against Henry III's sons. As a pretext they used the fact that Henry III was directly responsible for the premature death of Henry V (Henry and Bolesław III's father). In the end, Władysław I the Elbow-high managed to capture almost all of Greater Poland, but his allies only took the towns of Uraz (which was given to Henry) and Wołów and Lubiąż (granted to Bolesław III).

In 1314, Henry supported his brother-in-law Frederick the Fair, duke of Austria and Styria, in the battle for the throne as Roman-German King.

The war with Głogów began again in 1321. This time, however, Henry wasn't convinced as to the appropriateness of it, and in 1322 he signed a separated peace with the Głogów Dukes, receiving in return Smogorzew. The agreement was reinforced with the marriage of Henry's eldest daughter Elisabeth to Duke Konrad I of Oleśnica.

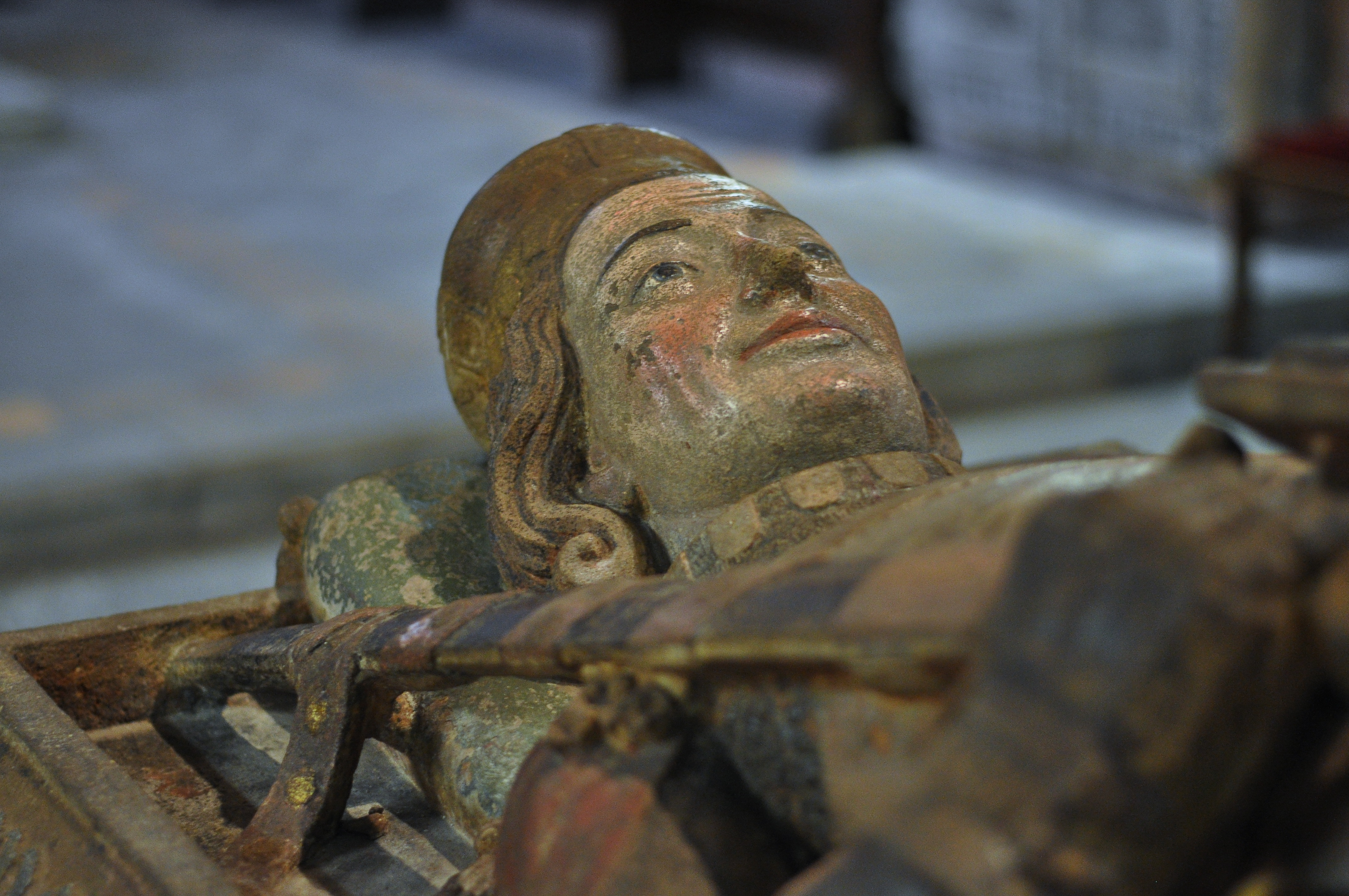
Effigy of Henry the Good on his tomb in Wrocław

By that time the relations between Henry and his older brother Bolesław III had seriously deteriorated. The reasons for this was Henry's refusal to support the overtly militaristic policy of his brother (as evidenced after he signed a peace with Konrad I of Oleśnica and his brothers) and Bolesław's pretensions to control the rich city of Wrocław. Bolesław even made an official proposal to exchange his district of Legnica for Wrocław. Henry refused this unfavorable transaction. The war between the brothers was imminent.

Henry reestablished contacts with Władysław I the Elbow-high (now King of Poland), and promised him homage and named him his heir in exchange for aid against Bolesław. However, Władysław I feared a direct confrontation with the Kingdom of Bohemia and declined the offer. Subsequently, Henry asked Emperor Louis IV for help. On 20 April 1324, the Duke of Wrocław declared himself a vassal of the Empire; in return, Henry gained the right of succession over his lands for his daughters, and as a consequence, the disinheritance of Bolesław III and his descendants. These decision prompted Bolesław to carry out armed attempts to settle the dispute, but finally Bolesław failed due to the powerful walls of Wrocław.

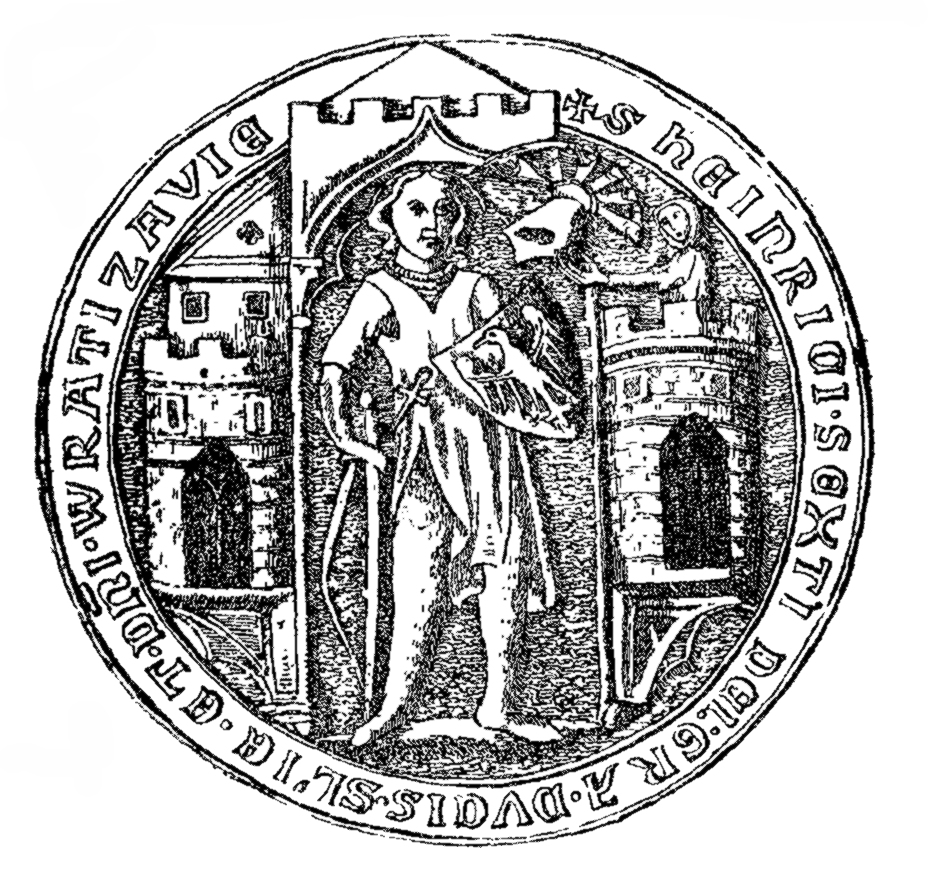
Henry VI's seal, dated to 1332.

However, his homage to the Holy Roman Empire did not secure his lands, especially since the fights with Bolesław III continued. To remedy this, in 1325, Henry arranged the marriage of his second daughter Euphemia with Bolesław the Elder, Duke of Niemodlin (Falkenberg). He also entered into an alliance with the Teutonic Order, which was directed against the principal supporter of Bolesław in Silesia, the King of Poland, Władysław I the Elbow-high.

Eventually, under pressure from the Wrocław nobility, Henry opted for an alliance with John of Luxemburg, King of Bohemia. The signing of the agreement took place in Wrocław on 6 April 1327. Under the terms of the treaty, Wrocław remained independent, but after the death of Henry would be adjoined to the Bohemian Kingdom. In return for these concessions, Henry obtain from the King the Kladsko Land (then northeastern part of Bohemia) for his lifetime and a high pension.

In the matters of internal policy, Henry was constrained by the powerful Wrocław nobility, who received from him many privileges. His relation with the Church was very firm and tense, and in fact, between 1319 and 1321 he was excommunicated.

Henry died on 24 November 1335 and was buried in the chapel of St. Hedwig in Wrocław.

== Marriage and issue ==
In 1310 Henry married with Anna (b. Vienna, 1280 – d. Wrocław, 19 March 1327), daughter of Albert I of Habsburg, Duke of Austria and widow of Herman, Margrave of Brandenburg-Salzwedel. They had three daughters:

1. Elisabeth (b. ca. 1311 – d. 20 February? 1328), married bef. 10 January 1322 to Duke Konrad I of Oleśnica.
2. Euphemia (Ofka) (b. ca. 1312 – d. 21 March aft. 1384), married bef. 29 November 1325 to Duke Bolesław the Elder of Niemodlin.
3. Margareta (b. ca. 1313 – d. 8 March 1379), Abbess of St. Clara in Wrocław (1359).

On his death without male heirs and according to the treaty of 1327, Wrocław was merged into the Bohemian crown.

== Notes ==
- This article was translated from his original in Polish Wikipedia.

Henry VI the Good House of Piast Born: 18 March 1294 Died: 24 November 1335
Preceded by Henry V the Fat	Duke of Wrocław; 1296–1335 with Bolesław III and Władysław (until 1311)	Annexed by Bohemia
Preceded by Henry V the Fat	Duke of Legnica; 1296–1311 with Bolesław III and Władysław	Succeeded by Władysław
Preceded by Henry V the Fat	Duke of Brieg; 1296–1311 with Bolesław III and Władysław	Succeeded by Bolesław III the Generous
