= Agnes of Kuenring =

Agnes of Kuenring (ca. 1236 - fl. 1261), was an Austrian noble, courtier of Queen Margaret of Austria and mistress of her spouse, King Ottokar II of Bohemia. She was the first historically documented mistress of a Bohemian sovereign.

== Life ==
Nothing is known about Agnes' early years. It is supposed that when Duchess Margaret of Austria married Prince Přemysl Ottokar of Bohemia in 1252, Agnes was part of Duchess Margaret's retinue as a lady-in-waiting.

Described by the chroniclers as one of the most beautiful women in court, with short cut red hair (which earned her the nickname Palcéřík), Agnes soon captivated the young Prince and, at around 16 years old, she became his official mistress. One year later, in 1253, Prince Přemysl Otakar succeeded his father as the King of Bohemia.

Queen Margaret was 48 when they married, and no longer able to bear children. Some chronicles suggest that she offered young Agnes to King Ottokar II as his mistress. This story was described by the chronicler Přibík Pulkava of Radenín:

At first the (Margaret's) shame of infertility was attributed to her husband. When Prince Přemysl learned about that, he said: Give me one of your ladies and prove my potency or impotence. She agreed and gave him one of the girls she loved more than others, the daughter of the House of Kuenring from Austria. In the first year she bore him a son, Nicholas, who was later made Duke of Opava... In addition, she made him father of three daughters ... So the infertility, earlier attributed to the husband, was credited to his wife.

The relationship between King Ottokar II and Agnes was well known by contemporary sources, and perhaps she even accompanied the King on festive occasions, instead of Queen Margaret.

Around the first year of the affair (ca. 1254–55), Agnes gave birth her first child, a son, named Nicholas, later Duke of Opava. It is known that she had more children with the King, but the exact number is contradictory in sources; it is believed that they had three daughters: Agnes (married Bavor III, Lord of Strakonicz), Elisabeth (married Vikard, Lord of Polna and Burgrave of Brünn) and one unknown daughter (wife of Vok, Lord of Kravaře), and another son, Ješek (d. 26 August 1296) (later Priest at Wysehrad).

After the birth of his eldest son, King Ottokar II's main objective was the recognition of this child as his heir. In 1260 he asked Pope Alexander IV for the legitimation of Nicholas and his siblings: the Pope recognised them as legitimate, but also expressly banned then from inheriting the throne. Without an heir that could inherit, Ottokar instead decided to have his marriage to Margaret annulled in 1261, citing the claim that Margaret had at some point prior to their wedding taken monastic vows. He then married Kunigunda of Halych. It is not known what happened to Agnes after that, but supposedly she returned to Austria with the former Queen.
