= Władysław of Legnica =

Duke of Legnica (1296–1312)

Władysław
- Duke of Legnica, Brzeg, Wrocław
- Coat-of-arms of Silesian Piasts.
- Born: 6 June 1296
- Died: after 13 January 1352
- Noble family: Silesian Piasts
- Spouse: Anna of Masovia
- Father: Henry V the Fat
- Mother: Elisabeth of Greater Poland

Władysław of Legnica (Polish: Władysław legnicki; 6 June 1296 – after 13 January 1352), was a Duke of Legnica during 1296–1312 (with his brothers until 1311 and briefly alone during 1311–1312), of Brzeg and Wrocław during 1296–1311 (with his brothers).

He was the third son of Henry V the Fat, Duke of Legnica and Wrocław, by his wife Elisabeth, daughter of Bolesław the Pious, Duke of Greater Poland. He was born four months after his father's death, on 22 February 1296.

== Life ==
Since his birth, Władysław was under the tutelage of both his mother, the Dowager Duchess Elisabeth (d. 1304) and his paternal uncle Bolko I (d. 1301). Between 1301-02 the official guardianship of Henry V's sons was taken by Henry of Würben, Bishop of Wrocław, and finally the authority over the Duchy of Wrocław-Legnica was taken by King Wenceslaus II of Bohemia and Poland personally.

In 1311 as a result of the pressure of the nobility of both Wrocław and Legnica (tired of the neglected rule of Bolesław III), the Duchy was divided into three parts: Wrocław, Legnica and Brzeg. The poorest and least important was Brzeg. In the division treaty it was stipulated that the brother who took this district would receive from the other two a payment of 50,000 pieces of silver. As the oldest, Bolesław III was allowed to choose first; as he had financial problems, he surprised his brothers by choosing Brzeg and the monetary compensation, so Henry could take Wrocław and Władysław obtain Legnica.

However, Władysław's reign over Legnica lasted only less than a year (1312) when he was deprived of the power by his older brother Bolesław III, because he wasn't able to pay the financial obligations imposed in the division treaty, but the official pretext was his mental instability. Two years later, in 1314 —and after unsuccessfully attempts to pay his debt and retake Legnica— Władysław's older brothers supported him to take up a spiritual career and he was appointed Canon in Wrocław.

Another important turning point Władysław's life occurred around 1325, when he fled to Masovia, broke his vows and married with Anna, the daughter of Duke Bolesław II on 13 August of that year. However, after three years (1328) —during which he unsuccessfully struggled to obtain his bride's dowry from her brothers— Władysław left his wife and returned to Silesia. The formal dissolution of the marriage was granted one year later, around 13 January 1329.

At that time, Władysław sold all his rights over Legnica to John of Luxemburg, King of Bohemia. This fact left his older brother Bolesław III in an uncomfortable situation. Władysław arrived as a vassal of Bohemia and with the orders to take control over his former land. However, Bolesław III made a quick move, and on 9 May 1329 he paid homage to King John and declared himself as his vassal. Władysław probably witnessed this, because he was along with the King on an expedition to cross Lithuania, for which he was set off against the Teutonic Order.

The money that Władysław received from John of Luxembourg was quickly exhausted. To survive, he becomes the chief of a band and with them, he was dedicated to looting the lands of his brother Bolesław III. Captured, he was imprisoned for half a year in a dungeon of the Legnica Castle, and was released only thanks to the intervention of his brother Henry VI the Good. Despite a pension granted to him by his brothers, he resumed his criminal activities. Once captured, he was imprisoned for over a year in dungeons.

When Władysław finally regained his freedom, he was a shadow of himself. His mental illness worsened during his captivity. Bolesław III decided to maintain him under his custody, and Władysław spent the rest of his life throughout Silesia, under close supervision. The exact date of his death is unknown, the only certain fact is that he survived his brothers and the day of his death was around 11 January.

Władysław of Legnica House of Piast Born: 6 June 1296 Died: after 13 January 1352
Preceded by Henry V the Fat	Duke of Legnica with Bolesław III and Henry VI (until 1311); 1296–1312	Succeeded by Bolesław III the Generous
Preceded by Henry V the Fat	Duke of Brieg with Bolesław III and Henry VI; 1296–1311	Succeeded by Bolesław III the Generous
Preceded by Henry V the Fat	Duke of Wrocław with Bolesław III and Henry VI; 1296–1311	Succeeded by Henry VI the Good
