= Elisabeth, daughter of Ottokar II =

Elisabeth (b. before 1260; d. after 1281) was a natural daughter of Bohemian king Ottokar II with his mistress Agnes of Kuenring.

Shortly before 1274, she married the Bohemian nobleman Oldřich z Drnholce (d. 1274). After his death, she married her relative Henry of Kuenring (d. 1281). After his death, she married for a third time. Her third husband was Vikart of Polna.
