= Bavor II =

Bohemian noble

Bavor II, known as Bavor the Great (Czech: Bavor Veliký; c. 1220 – c. 1279), was a Czech nobleman. He was the feudal ruler of Strakonice in Bohemia and Castellan of royal Zvíkov Castle.

He was the son of Bavor I of the noble Bavors of Strakonice family. He held Pořešín, Blatná, Horažďovice, and others, including the Bouzov Castle. He took as his wife Agnes, the illegitimate daughter of Otakar II of Bohemia. He built a new palace, giving his former palace to the Knights Hospitallers. He was a favorite of the Bohemian king and served as Supreme Marshal of the Kingdom of Bohemia.

Bavor and Anežka had three sons, Bavor III, his heir, Mikuláš and Vilém.

== Bibliography ==
- SVOBODA, Miroslav. Páni ze Strakonic : vládci Prácheňska a dobrodinci johanitů. Praha : Nakladatelství Lidové noviny, 2010. ISBN 978-80-7422-034-0.
