= Katarina Šubić =

Katarina Šubić (Polish: Katarzyną; d. bef. 5 March 1358), was a Croatian noblewoman from Croatian noble Šubić family and by marriage, Duchess of Legnica-Brzeg.

== Biography ==
Katharina was the daughter of Mladen II Šubić, Ban of Croatia and Lord of all of Bosnia.

Katharina married Bolesław III the Generous, Duke of Legnica-Brzeg, in 1326, four years after the death of his first wife, Princess Margareta of Bohemia. The marriage, which lasted almost twenty-six years, was childless.

After the abdication of her husband in 1342, Katharina retired with him to Brzeg, where they remained until Bolesław III's death ten years later, on 21 April 1352.

In his will, Bolesław III left the Duchies of Brzeg and Oława to Katharina as her dower. This was the second documented case where a Piast ruler granted his widow lands in her own right; the first was Salome of Berg, who received Łęczyca from her husband Bolesław III Wrymouth when he died in 1138. The terms of the dower grant stated that the beneficiary could obtain the full sovereignty over the land for her life, and could lose it in two cases: if she remarried or became a nun (resignation was not considered).

Katharina reigned as Duchess of Brzeg for six years until her own death, in 1358. Brzeg returned to the hands of her stepsons, Wenceslaus I and Louis I.

Preceded by Bolesław III the Generous	Duchess of Brzeg; 1352–1358	Succeeded by Wenceslaus I
