= Bavors of Strakonice =

Coat of Arms of Bovorove

Bavorové ze Strakonic (Bavors of Strakonice) were a Bohemian noble family, rulers of Strakonice town and surrounding area.

Members of the family include:

- Bavor I
- Bavor II, Bavor the Great
- Bavor III
- Vilém of Strakonice
- Mikuláš of Strakonice
- Bavor IV (last holder of the Strakonice Castle)
- Vilém (II) of Strakonice
- Břeněk ze Strakonic (last member of the family; died 1404)

== Bibliography ==
- HALADA, Jan. Lexikon české šlechty (erby, fakta, osobnosti, sídla a zajímavosti). Praha : AKROPOLIS, 1992. ISBN 80-901020-3-4. Article Bavorové ze Strakonic, s. 14–15.
- KOTLÁROVÁ, Simona. Bavorové erbu střely. České Budějovice : Veduta, 2004. ISBN 80-86829-04-9.
- SVOBODA, Miroslav. Páni ze Strakonic : vládci Prácheňska a dobrodinci johanitů. Praha : Nakladatelství Lidové noviny, 2010. ISBN 978-80-7422-034-0.
