= Wenceslaus III of Bohemia =

King of Bohemia and Poland from 1305 to 1306

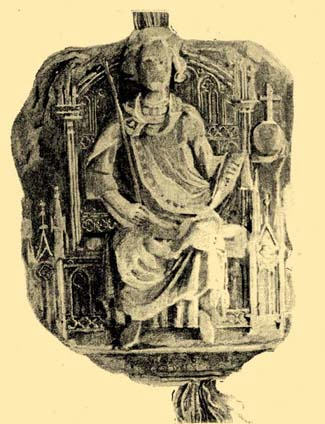
- Wenceslaus III depicted on his royal seal

King of Hungary and Croatia Contested by Charles I of Hungary
- Reign: 27 August 1301 – 9 October 1305
- Coronation: 27 August 1301, Székesfehérvár
- Predecessor: Andrew III of Hungary
- Successor: Otto III, Duke of Bavaria

King of Bohemia
- Reign: 21 June 1305 – 4 August 1306
- Predecessor: Wenceslaus II of Bohemia
- Successor: Henry of Bohemia

King of Poland contested by Władysław I Łokietek
- Reign: 21 June 1305 – 4 August 1306
- Predecessor: Wenceslaus II of Bohemia
- Successor: Władysław I Łokietek
- Born: 6 October 1289; Prague, Kingdom of Bohemia
- Died: 4 August 1306 (aged 16); Olomouc, Kingdom of Bohemia
- Spouse: Viola of Teschen (m. 1305)
- Issue: Elizabeth, Abbess of Pustiměřu (illegitimate)
- Dynasty: Přemyslid
- Father: Wenceslaus II of Bohemia
- Mother: Judith of Habsburg
- Religion: Roman Catholic

Wenceslaus III of Bohemia (Czech: Václav III., Hungarian: Vencel, Polish: Wacław, Croatian: Vjenceslav, Slovak: Václav; 6 October 1289 – 4 August 1306) was King of Hungary and Croatia from 1301 to 1305, and King of Bohemia and Poland from 1305. He was the son of Wenceslaus II of Bohemia (later also crowned King of Poland), and Judith of Habsburg.

While still a child, Wenceslaus was betrothed to Elizabeth, the only daughter of Andrew III of Hungary. After Andrew's death in early 1301, most Hungarian lords and prelates elected Wenceslaus as king, although Pope Boniface VIII supported a rival claimant, Charles I of Hungary of the royal House of Anjou (Kingdom of Naples).

Wenceslaus was crowned king of Hungary on 27 August 1301. He signed his charters under the name Ladislaus in Hungary. His rule was only nominal because a dozen powerful lords held sway over large territories in the kingdom. His father realised that Wenceslaus's position could not be strengthened and took him back from Hungary to Bohemia in August 1304. Wenceslaus succeeded his father in Bohemia and Poland on 21 June 1305. He abandoned his claim to Hungary in favour of Otto III, Duke of Bavaria on 9 October.

Wenceslaus granted large parcels of the royal domains to his young friends in Bohemia. A local claimant to the Polish throne, Władysław I Łokietek, who had started conquering Polish territories during the rule of Wenceslaus's father, captured Kraków in early 1306. Wenceslaus decided to invade his rival's territories in Poland, but he was murdered before starting his campaign. He was the last of the male Přemyslid rulers of Bohemia.

== Childhood (1289–1301) ==
He was the second son of Wenceslaus II, King of Bohemia and Wenceslaus II's wife, Judith of Habsburg. He was born in Prague on 6 October 1289. His elder brother died before his birth and he was the only son of his parents to survive infancy.

Wenceslaus was still a child when his mother, Judith, died on 18 June 1297. He was betrothed to Elizabeth of Töss on 12 February 1298. She was the only child of Andrew III of Hungary. Andrew III was the last male member of the House of Árpád, the native royal dynasty of Hungary, but the legitimacy of his rule had not been unanimously acknowledged.

Wenceslaus's father occupied Greater Poland, Kujavia and other regions of Poland in early 1300. After his main opponent, Władysław I Łokietek, was forced to leave the kingdom, Wenceslaus II was crowned King of Poland in Gniezno in late September 1300. However, Pope Boniface VIII refused to confirm Wenceslaus II's position in Poland.

== King of Hungary and Croatia (1301–1305) ==
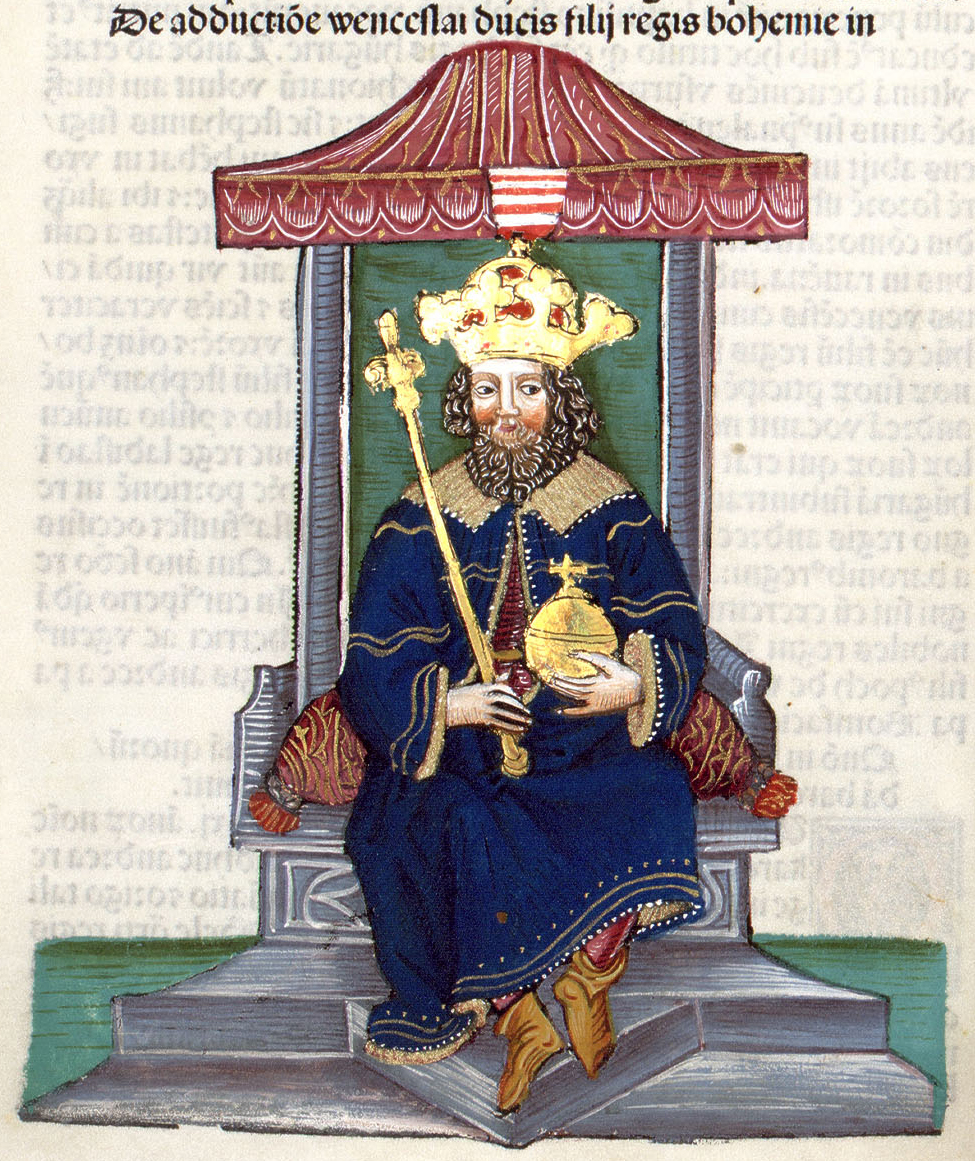
Wenceslaus, King of Hungary as depicted in the Chronica Hungarorum

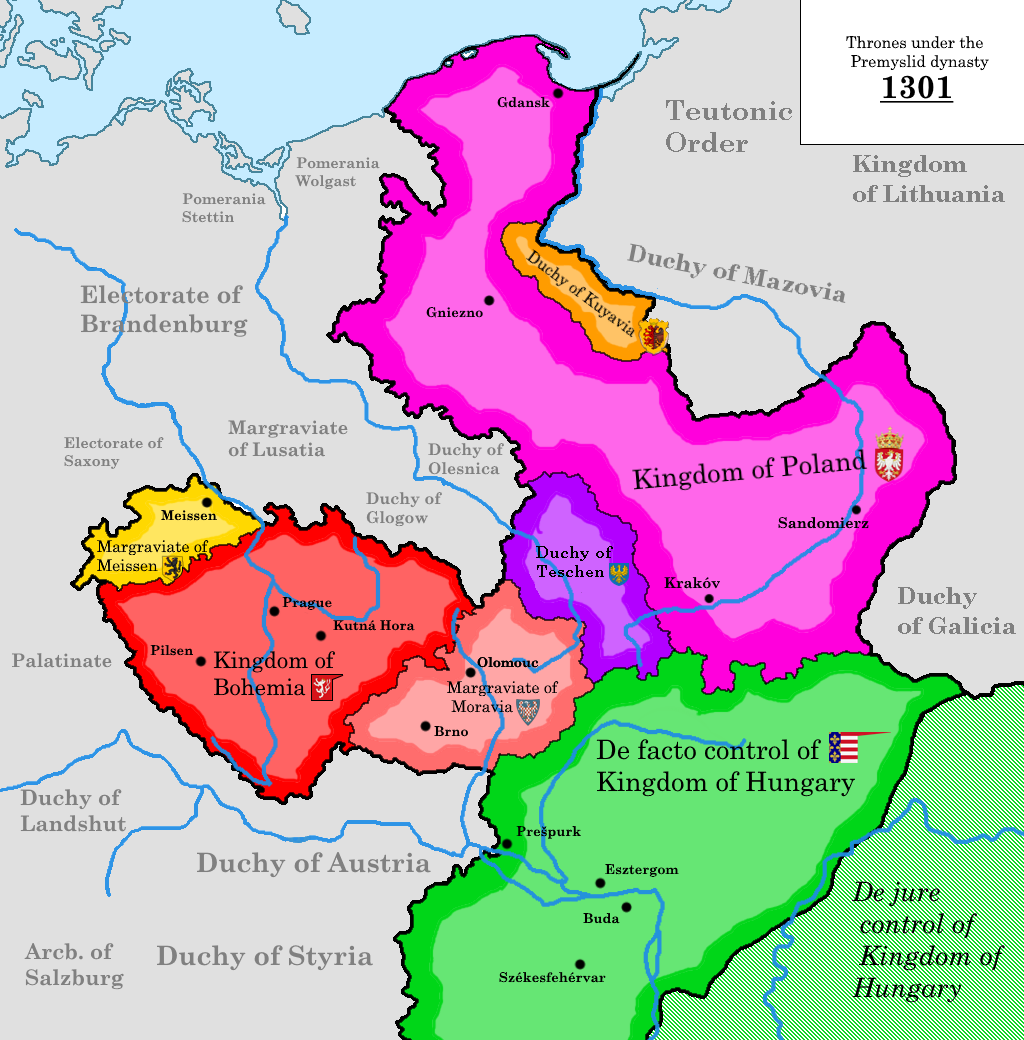
Přemyslid claims and territory in 1301

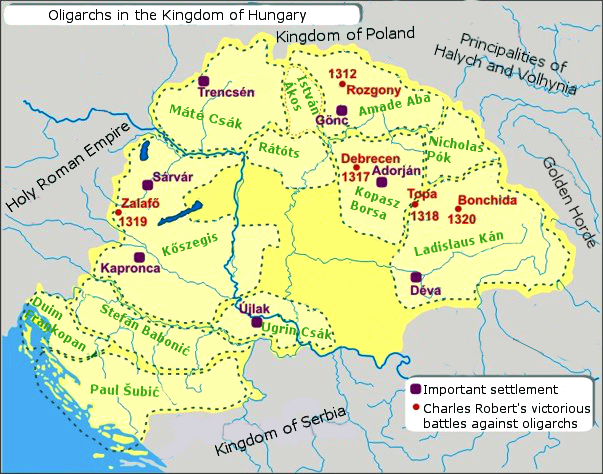
The provinces ruled by the "oligarchs" (powerful lords) in the early 14th century

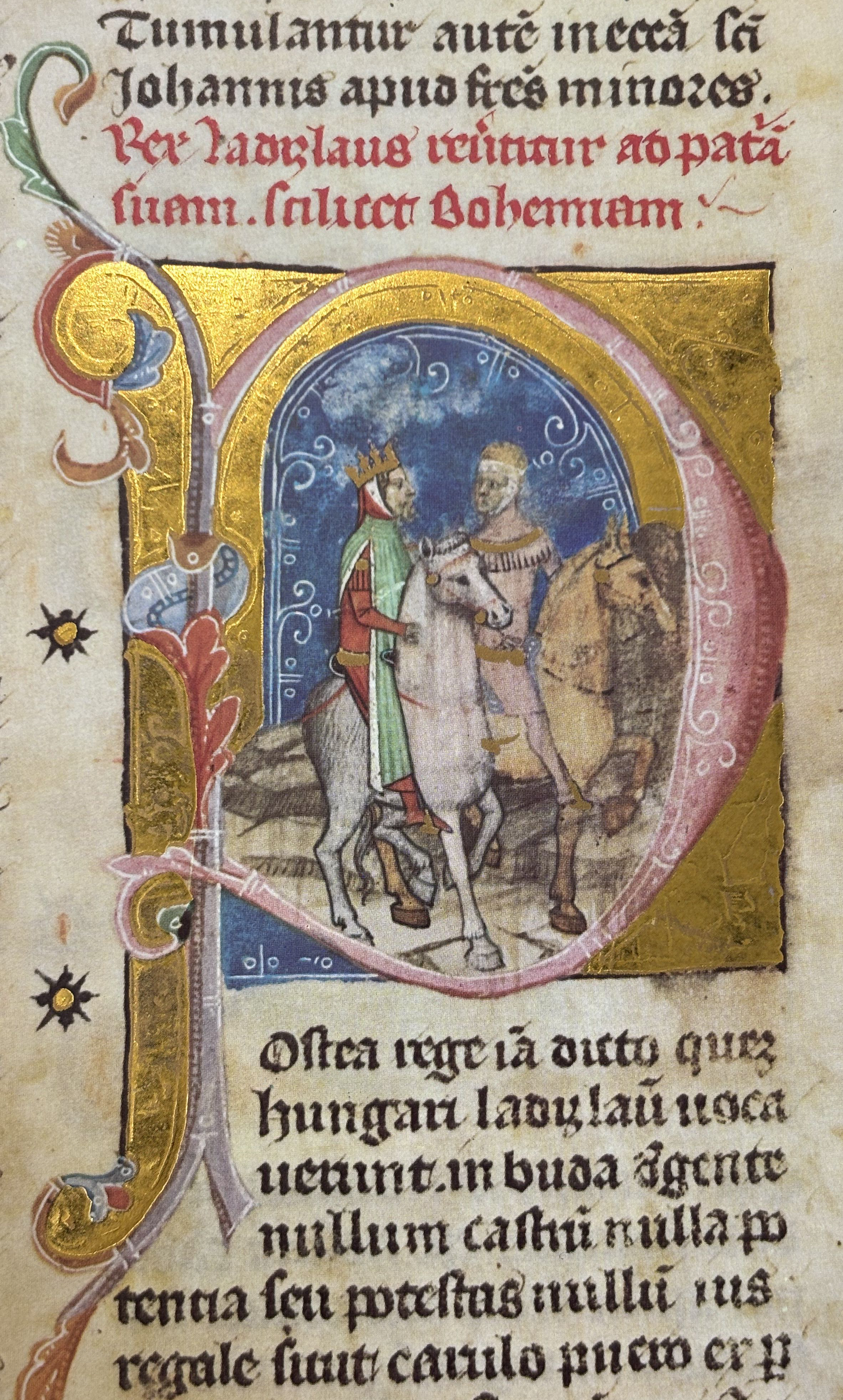
Wenceslaus leaves Hungary (from the Illuminated Chronicle).

Andrew III of Hungary died on 14 January 1301, leaving no male heirs. The late king's rival, Charles I of Hungary, who was Béla IV of Hungary's great-great-grandson, had regarded himself as the lawful king of Hungary for years. On hearing Andrew III's death, Charles of Anjou hurried to Esztergom, where Gregory Bicskei, Archbishop-elect of Esztergom, crowned him king. Being Pope Boniface VIII's candidate for the Hungarian throne, Charles had always been unpopular, because the Hungarian lords feared that they would "lose their freedom by accepting a king appointed by the Church", according to the Illuminated Chronicle. Charles's coronation was not performed with the Holy Crown of Hungary in Székesfehérvár, as it was required by customary law, but with a provisional crown in Esztergom. Accordingly, the diet of Hungary declared Charles's coronation invalid on 13 May 1301.

Jan Muskata, Bishop of Kraków, who was Wenceslaus II of Bohemia's advisor, was the first to propose that Wenceslaus II's son and namesake should be elected king of Hungary. The younger Wenceslaus was not only Béla IV of Hungary's great-great-grandson, but also the fiancé of the late Andrew III of Hungary's daughter. Bribed by Wenceslaus II's agents, the majority of the Hungarian lords and prelates decided to offer the crown to the young Wenceslaus and sent a delegation to his father in Bohemia. Wenceslaus II met the Hungarian envoys in Hodonín in August and accepted their offer in his eleven-year-old son's name. Wenceslaus II accompanied his son to Székesfehérvár, where John Hont-Pázmány, archbishop of Kalocsa, crowned the young Wenceslaus king with the Holy Crown on 27 August. Wenceslaus, who assumed the name Ladislaus, signed all his charters under that name in Hungary.

After Wenceslaus II returned to Bohemia, Jan Muskata became the young king's principal advisor in Hungary. Most lords and prelates accepted the rule of Wenceslaus-Ladislaus. In contrast with their Hungarian peers, the Croatian lords did not acknowledge Wenceslaus-Ladislaus as a lawful king and remained faithful to Charles of Anjou. The latter withdrew to the southern territories of Hungary after Ivan Kőszegi, who was a partisan of Wenceslaus-Ladislaus, captured Esztergom in late August 1301. However, both kings' authority remained nominal because Hungary had meanwhile disintegrated into a dozen provinces, each headed by a powerful lord, or "oligarch". The Illuminated Chronicle writes that the Hungarian lords did not "grant a castle, or might and power, or royal authority" either to Wenceslaus-Ladislaus or to Charles of Anjou.

In his letters to Wenceslaus II of Bohemia and Archbishop John of Kalocsa, Pope Boniface VIII emphasised that Wenceslaus-Ladislaus had been crowned without the authorisation of the Holy See. The papal legate, Niccolo Boccasini, who came to Hungary in September, started negotiations with the Hungarian prelates to convince them to abandon Wenceslaus-Ladislaus and support Charles of Anjou's case. In an attempt to buy the most powerful lords off, Wenceslaus-Ladislaus granted large estates and high offices to them. Matthew Csák received Nyitra and Trencsén Counties, along with the royal castles and the estates attached to them, in February 1302. Ivan Kőszegi was made Palatine of Hungary before 25 April 1302. In the first half of that year, many prelates (including Stephen, the new Archbishop of Kalocsa) abandoned Wenceslaus-Ladislaus; even Jan Muskata left Hungary.

Taking advantage of the weakened position of his rival, Charles of Anjou attempted to capture Buda, the capital of Wenceslaus-Ladislaus, in September 1302. After laying siege to Buda, Charles of Anjou called upon the burghers to extradite Wenceslaus-Ladislaus. The mainly German citizenry and their major, Werner, remained faithful to the young king and Ivan Kőszegi relieved the city in the same month. After Charles of Anjou withdrew from Buda, the papal legate placed the town under interdict. In response, a local priest excommunicated the pope and all Hungarian prelates. On 31 May 1303, Pope Boniface VIII declared Charles of Anjou the lawful king of Hungary, stating that Wenceslaus-Ladislaus's election had been invalid. Thereafter, Albert I of Germany, who was the maternal uncle of both Wenceslaus-Ladislaus and Charles of Anjou, called on Wenceslaus-Ladislaus to withdraw from Hungary.

To strengthen his son's position, Wenceslaus II of Bohemia came to Hungary at the head of a large army in May 1304. He captured Esztergom, but his negotiations with the local lords convinced him that his son's position in Hungary had dramatically weakened. Accordingly, he decided to take Wenceslaus-Ladislaus back to Bohemia. Wenceslaus-Ladislaus did not renounce Hungary and made Ivan Kőszegi governor before leaving for Bohemia in August. He even took the Holy Crown of Hungary with himself to Prague. Charles of Anjou and Rudolf III of Austria invaded Moravia in September, but did not defeat Wenceslaus II's army. In the same months, a member of the Piast dynasty, Władysław I Łokietek, who had claimed Poland against Wenceslaus II, returned to Poland at the head of Hungarian troops. Before long, he captured many important forts and towns, including Pełczyska, Wiślica, Sandomierz and Sieradz.

== King of Bohemia and Poland (1305–1306) and death ==
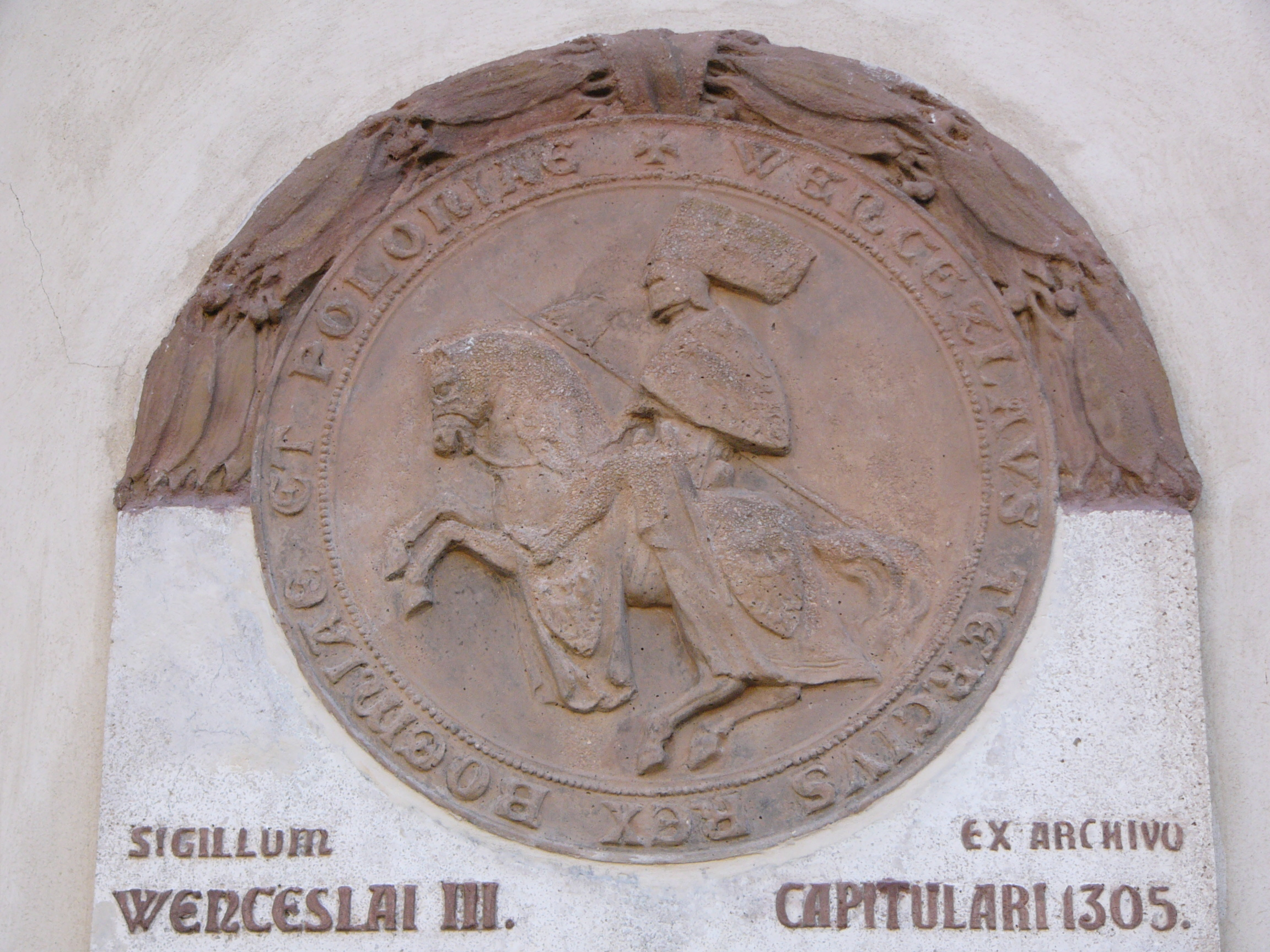
Reproduction of Wenceslaus III' seal in Olomouc

Wenceslaus II of Bohemia and Poland died on 21 June 1305. Wenceslaus III succeeded his father in both kingdoms, but his position in Poland was precarious because Władysław I Łokietek continued his fight for the Polish throne. Wenceslaus realised that he could not preserve his three kingdoms and decided to renounce Hungary. However, instead of acknowledging Charles of Anjou as the lawful king of Hungary, Wenceslaus abandoned his claim to the Hungarian throne in favour of Otto III of Bavaria, who was Béla IV of Hungary's grandson. Wenceslaus handed the Holy Crown of Hungary over to Otto in Brno on 9 October 1305. In the same months, Wenceslaus, who had meanwhile broken his engagement to Elizabeth of Hungary, married Viola of Teschen upon the Bohemian lords' advice.

The sixteen-year-old Wenceslaus led a dissolute life. He was surrounded by a group of young Czech noblemen, to whom he made large land grants. His position in Poland was further weakened after Władysław I Łokietek captured Kraków in early 1306. To forge an alliance against his rival, Wenceslaus granted Gdańsk and Pomorze to Waldemar, Margrave of Brandenburg-Stendal and Herman, Margrave of Brandenburg-Salzwedel as fiefs in July 1306. After deciding to invade Poland, Wenceslaus dismissed his young favourites and made his brother-in-law, Henry of Bohemia, governor. However, before Wenceslaus could invade, he was stabbed in Olomouc on 4 August 1306. His assassin was never identified. Wenceslaus was the last king of Bohemia from the native Přemyslid dynasty.

== See also ==
- History of Poland during the Piast dynasty
- List of unsolved murders (before 1900)

== Bibliography ==
=== Primary sources ===
- The Hungarian Illuminated Chronicle: Chronica de Gestis Hungarorum (Edited by Dezső Dercsényi) (1970). Corvina, Taplinger Publishing. ISBN 0-8008-4015-1.

=== Secondary sources ===
- Bartl, Július; Čičaj, Viliam; Kohútova, Mária; Letz, Róbert; Segeš, Vladimír; Škvarna, Dušan (2002). Slovak History: Chronology and Lexicon. Bolchazy-Carducci Publishers, Slovenské Pedegogické Nakladatel'stvo. ISBN 0-86516-444-4.
- Csukovits, Enikő (2012). "Vencel". In Gujdár, Noémi; Szatmáry, Nóra (eds.). Magyar királyok nagykönyve: Uralkodóink, kormányzóink és az erdélyi fejedelmek életének és tetteinek képes története [Encyclopedia of the Kings of Hungary: An Illustrated History of the Life and Deeds of Our Monarchs, Regents and the Princes of Transylvania] (in Hungarian). Reader's Digest. pp. 108–109. ISBN 978-963-289-214-6.
- Engel, Pál (2001). The Realm of St Stephen: A History of Medieval Hungary, 895–1526. I.B. Tauris. ISBN 1-86064-061-3.
- Fine, John V. A. (1994) [1987]. The Late Medieval Balkans: A Critical Survey from the Late Twelfth Century to the Ottoman Conquest. Ann Arbor, Michigan: University of Michigan Press. ISBN 978-0-472-10079-8.
- Knoll, Paul W. (1972). The Rise of the Polish Monarchy: Piast Poland in East Central Europe, 1320-1370. University of Chicago Press. ISBN 0-226-44826-6.
- Kontler, László (1999). Millennium in Central Europe: A History of Hungary. Atlantisz Publishing House. ISBN 963-9165-37-9.
- Kristó, Gyula (1988). Az Anjou-kor háborúi [Wars in the Age of the Angevins] (in Hungarian). Zrínyi Kiadó. ISBN 963-326-905-9.
- Lukowski, Jerzy; Zawadski, Hubert (2006). A Concise History of Poland. Cambridge University Press. ISBN 978-0-521-61857-1.
- Pražák, Richard (2002). "Vencel (László)". In Kristó, Gyula (ed.). Magyarország vegyes házi királyai [The Kings of Various Dynasties of Hungary] (in Hungarian). Szukits Könyvkiadó. pp. 7–14. ISBN 963-9441-58-9.
- Schmidt, Ondřej (2019). John of Moravia between the Czech Lands and the Patriarchate of Aquileia (ca. 1345–1394). Brill Publishers.
- Solymosi, László; Körmendi, Adrienne (1981). "A középkori magyar állam virágzása és bukása, 1301–1506 [The Heyday and Fall of the Medieval Hungarian State, 1301–1526]". In Solymosi, László (ed.). Magyarország történeti kronológiája, I: a kezdetektől 1526-ig [Historical Chronology of Hungary, Volume I: From the Beginning to 1526] (in Hungarian). Akadémiai Kiadó. pp. 188–228. ISBN 963-05-2661-1.
- Žemlička, Josef (2011). "The Realm of Přemysl Ottokar II and Wenceslas II". In Pánek, Jaroslav; Tůma, Oldřich (eds.). A History of the Czech Lands. Charles University. pp. 106–116. ISBN 978-80-246-1645-2.

Wenceslaus III of Bohemia House of Přemyslid Born: 6 October 1289 Died: 4 August 1306
Regnal titles
Preceded by Andrew III of Hungary	King of Hungary and Croatia; 1301 – 1305	Succeeded by Otto III, Duke of Bavaria
Preceded by Wenceslaus II	King of Bohemia; 1305 – 1306	Succeeded by Henry of Bohemia
Preceded by Wenceslaus II	King of Poland; 1305 – 1306	Succeeded by Władysław I Łokietek
