= Wenceslaus II of Bohemia =

King of Bohemia from 1278 to 1305

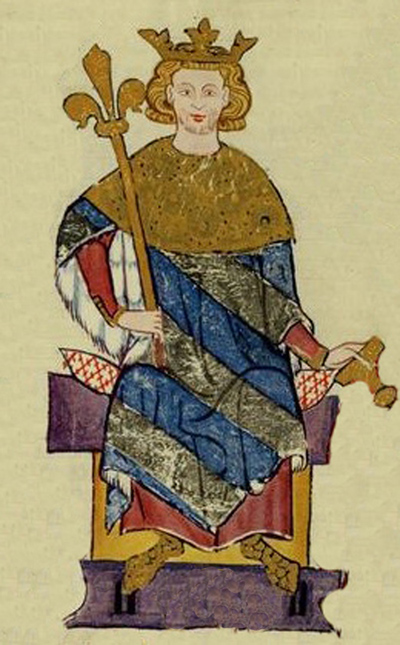
- Portrayal in Codex Manesse

King of Bohemia
- Reign: 26 August 1278 – 21 June 1305
- Coronation: 2 June 1297, Prague
- Predecessor: Ottokar II of Bohemia
- Successor: Wenceslaus III of Bohemia
- Regent: Otto V, Margrave of Brandenburg (1278 - 1283)

King of Poland
- Reign: 1296 – 1305
- Coronation: 25 July 1300, Gniezno
- Predecessor: Przemysl II
- Successor: Wenceslaus III of Bohemia
- Born: 27 September 1271; Prague, Bohemia
- Died: 21 June 1305 (aged 33); Prague, Bohemia
- Spouse: Judith of Habsburg (m. 1285; died 1297) Elisabeth Richeza of Poland (m. 1303)
- Issue: Wenceslas III, King of Bohemia; Anne, Queen of Bohemia; Elisabeth, Queen of Bohemia; Margaret, Duchess of Wroclaw; Agnes, Duchess of Jawor
- Dynasty: Přemyslid
- Father: Ottokar II of Bohemia
- Mother: Kunigunda of Halych

Wenceslaus II of Bohemia (Czech: Václav II.; Polish: Wacław II Czeski; 27 September 1271 – 21 June 1305) was King of Bohemia (1278–1305), Duke of Cracow (1291–1305), and King of Poland (1296–1305).

He was the only surviving son of King Ottokar II of Bohemia and Ottokar's second wife Kunigunda. He was born in 1271, ten years after the marriage of his parents. Kunigunda was the daughter of Rostislav Mikhailovich, lord of Slavonia, son of a Grand Prince of Kiev, and Anna of Hungary, daughter of Béla IV of Hungary. His great-grandfather was the German king Philip of Swabia. Wenceslaus II was the grandfather of the Holy Roman Emperor, Charles IV. He was a member of the Přemyslid dynasty.

== Early years ==
Weneclaus was one of three sons of Ottokar II and Kunigunda, and the only one to survive to adulthood. In 1276 Rudolf I, King of the Romans, placed Ottokar under the ban of the empire and besieged Vienna. This compelled Ottokar in November 1276 to sign a new treaty by which he gave up all claims to Austria and the neighbouring duchies, retaining for himself only Bohemia and Moravia. Wenceslaus was then betrothed to Rudolf's daughter Judith, creating an uneasy peace. Wenceslaus's father died on 26 August 1278 in the Battle on the Marchfeld shortly before Wenceslaus's seventh birthday.

Before Wenceslaus became of age, the government was handled by Otto V, Margrave of Brandenburg, who is said to have held Wenceslaus captive in several locations. He returned to Bohemia in 1283, at the age of twelve, and officially ruled without a regent, however he remained under a heavy influence of his mother Kunigunda of Halych and her new partner, Záviš of Falkenstein. At some point between 1283 and 9 September 1285, when the Dowager Queen died, Záviš and Kunigunda married after gaining the young King's consent, though there is speculation they had already held a wedding in the early 1280s without his approval. Despite his mother's death, Weneclaus remained under his stepfather's influence for the next few years.

On 24 January 1285, Wenceslaus married Judith of Habsburg, daughter of Rudolf I, to whom he had been betrothed since 1276. In 1290, Wenceslaus had Záviš beheaded for alleged treason and began ruling independently.

== Polish kingship ==
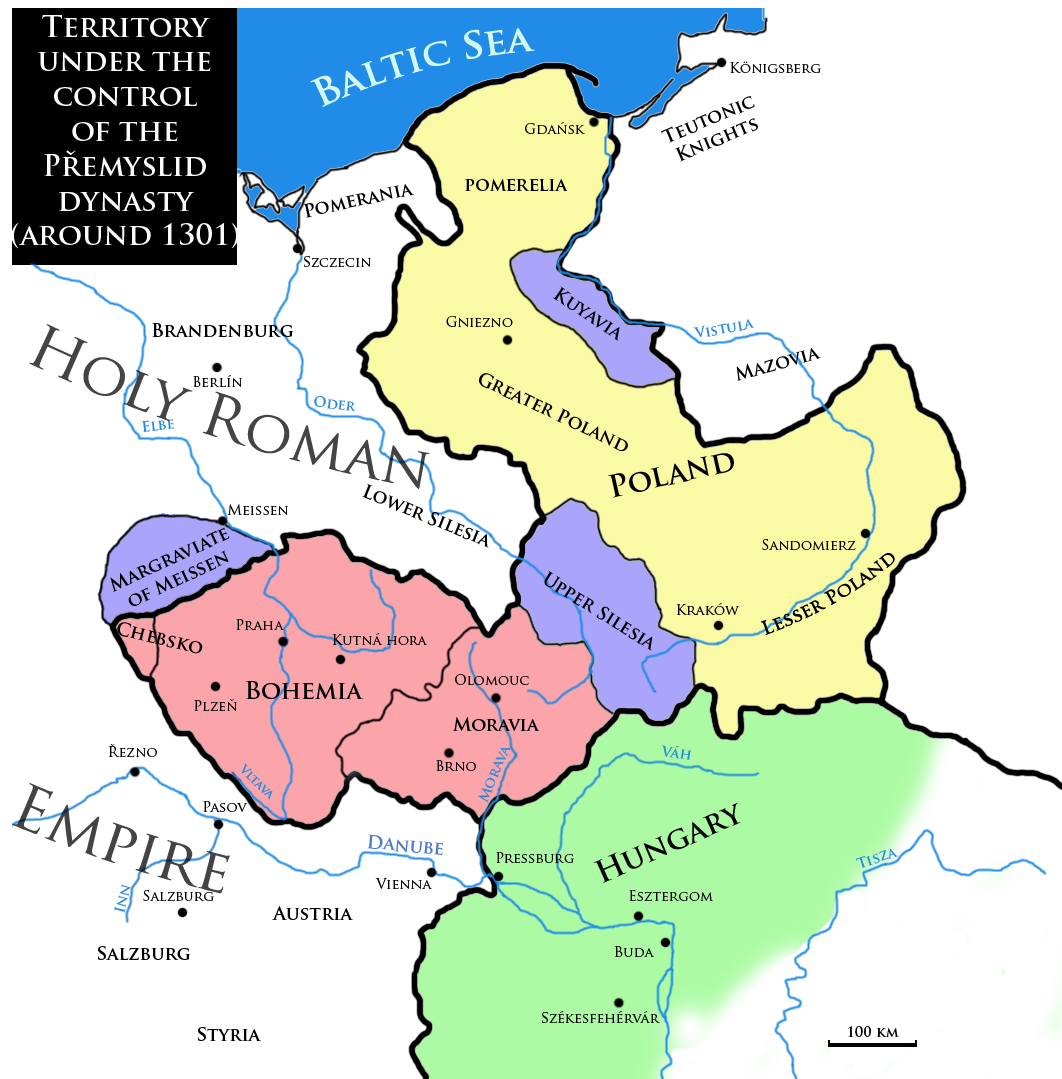
Territory under the control of the Přemyslids, c. 1301

In 1291, High Duke Przemysł II of Poland ceded the sovereign Duchy of Kraków to Wenceslaus. Kraków was associated with the overlordship of Poland, but Przemysł held the other duchies and in 1295 was crowned king. After Przemysł's death in 1296, Wenceslaus became overlord of Poland and, in 1300, had himself crowned its king.

== Silver in Kutná Hora ==
In 1298, silver was discovered at Kuttenberg (now Kutná Hora) in Central Bohemia. Wenceslaus took control of the mine by making silver production a royal monopoly and issued the Prague groschen, which became the most popular of the early Groschen-type coins. Kutná Hora was one of the richest European silver strikes ever: between 1300 and 1340, the mine may have produced as much as 20 tons of silver a year.

In 1300, Wenceslaus issued the new royal mining code Ius regale montanorum. This was a legal document that specified all administrative as well as technical terms and conditions necessary for the operation of mines.

== The Crown of Hungary and death ==
Queen Judith died in 1297. Wenceslaus' second wife was Elisabeth Richeza, daughter of King Przemysl II of Poland (1295–1296).

In 1301, Wenceslaus' kinsman Andrew III of Hungary died and the Árpád dynasty became extinct in the male line. Wenceslaus was one of the relatives who claimed the throne, and he accepted it from a party of Hungarians on behalf of his young son, betrothed to Andrew's only child, Elizabeth. On 27 August 1301, his son was crowned in Székesfehérvár as king of Hungary.

At that time the Kingdom of Hungary was split into several de facto principalities, and young Wenceslaus was only accepted as the King of Hungary by the rulers in Upper Hungary (Matthew III Csák), West-Transdanubia in modern-day Burgenland and West-Transdanubia, (where the Güssings Kőszegi (Croatian: Gisingovci) family were their strongest supporters, and on territory around the capital, Buda. But the Abas and Matthew Csák switched sides in 1303 and started to support Wenceslaus' rival Charles Robert of Anjou. Consequently, the young Wenceslaus, in Ofen (Buda), became afraid and wrote to his father in Prague for help. His father took a large army and invaded Buda, but having considered the situation, he took his son and the Hungarian crown and returned to Bohemia (1304). Ivan Kőszegi was named to represent Wenceslaus III in Hungary.

Wenceslaus II died on 21 June 1305, at the age of 33, probably of tuberculosis. He was succeeded by his son, Wenceslaus III, the last of the Přemyslid kings.

== Review of the government of Wenceslaus II ==
Wenceslaus II is considered one of the most important Czech kings. He built a great empire stretching from the Baltic Sea to the Danube river and established numerous cities, such as Plzeň in 1295. He won for his family three royal crowns (Bohemia, Hungary and Poland). The Kingdom of Bohemia was the largest producer of silver in Europe in his time. He created the Prague Groschen, which was an important European currency for centuries.

During his reign, there was great urban development. He planned to build the first university in Central Europe. The power and wealth of the Kingdom of Bohemia gave rise to great respect, but also to the hostility of European royal families. His son King Wenceslaus III was unable to maintain a mighty empire, and soon after the untimely death of Wenceslaus II, his empire began to crumble.

== Family ==
In 1285 in Eger (Cheb), he married the German Princess Judith of Habsburg (1271–1297), daughter of King Rudolf I of Germany and his wife Gertrude of Hohenberg. She died shortly after their 10th child was born:

- Přemysl Otakar (6 May 1288 – 19 November 1288);
- Wenceslaus III (6 October 1289 – 4 August 1306); King of Bohemia, King of Hungary and King of Poland;
- Agnes (6 October 1289 – soon after 6 August 1296), twin of Wenceslaus; married in 1296 to Rupert, eldest surviving son of German King Adolf, King of the Romans;
- Anne (10 October 1290 – 3 September 1313), married in 1306 to Henry of Bohemia;
- Elisabeth (20 January 1292 – 28 September 1330), married in 1310 to John of Bohemia;
- Judith (3 March 1293 – 3 August 1294);
- John (26 February 1294 – 1 March 1295);
- John (21 February 1295 – 6 December 1296);
- Margaret (21 February 1296 – 8 April 1322), married in 1308 to Bolesław III the Generous, Duke of Silesia;
- Judith (born and died 21 May 1297).

In 1303, he married the Princess Elisabeth Richeza of Poland (1286–1335), daughter of Przemysł II, King of Poland. They had one child:

- Agnes (25 June 1305 – before 4 January 1337), married to Henry I, Duke of Jawor.

Wenceslaus also had numerous illegitimate children, including Jan Volek (?? – 27 September 1351), bishop of Olomouc, and possibly Elizabeth, Abbess of Pustiměřu.

== Gallery ==
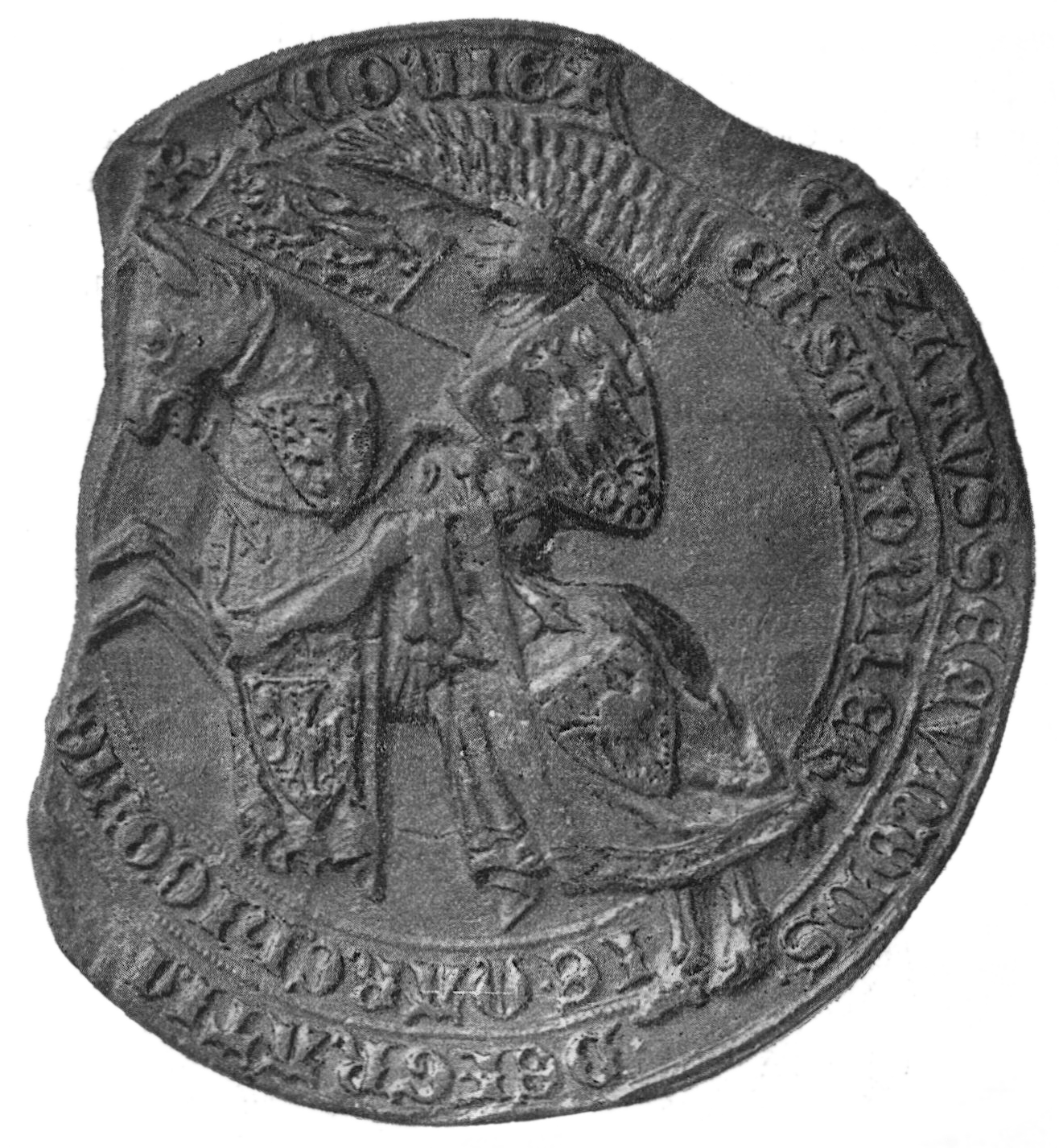
Seal of Wenceslaus II

Coat of arms of Wenceslaus II (Kingdom of Bohemia)

Coat of arms of Wenceslaus II (Margraviate of Moravia)

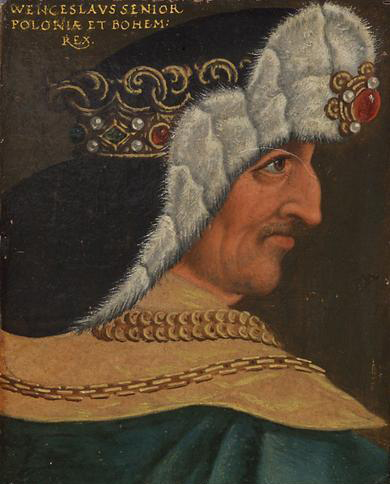
Wenceslaus II of Bohemia and Poland

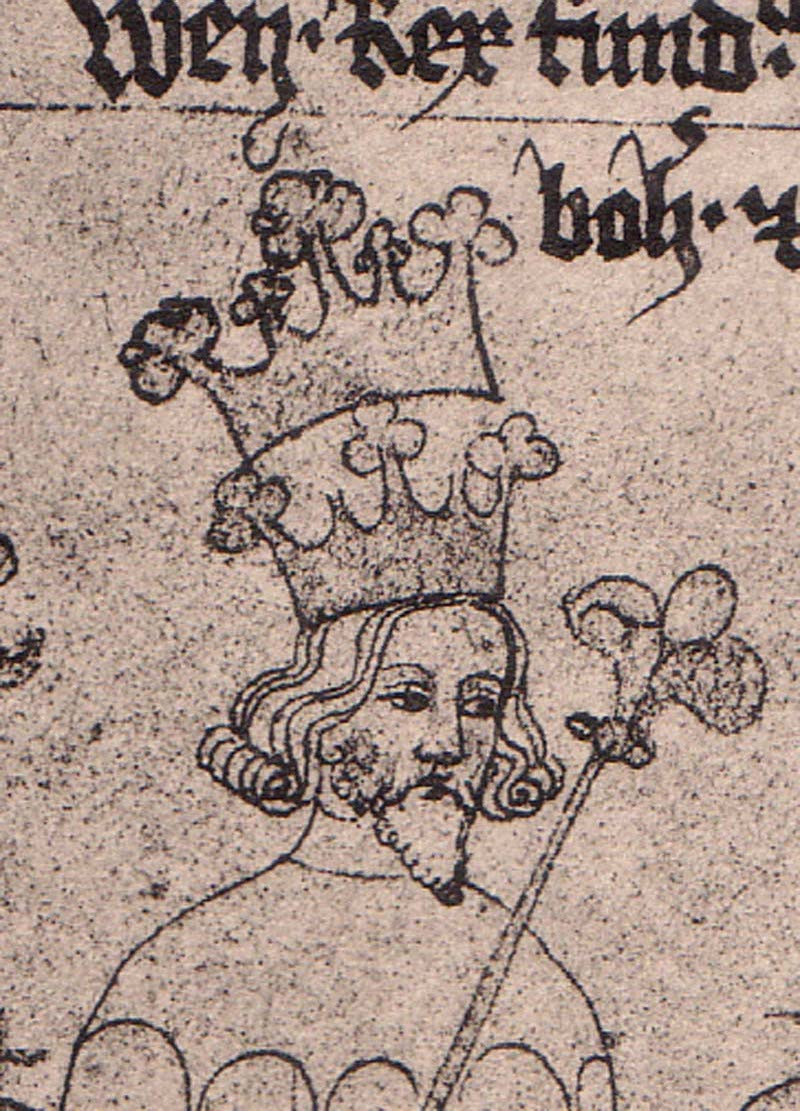
Václav II

== Bibliography ==
- Davies, Norman (1982). God's Playground: A History of Poland. Vol. I: The Origins to 1795. Columbia University Press.
- Jones, Michael (1995). The New Cambridge Medieval History: Volume 6, c. 1300 – c. 1415. Cambridge: Cambridge University Press. ISBN 978-0521362900.
- Krofta, Kamil (1957). "Bohemia to the Extinction of the Premyslids". In Tanner, J. R.; Previt-Orton, C. W.; Brook, Z. N. (eds.). The Cambridge Medieval History. Vol. VI: Victory of the Papacy. Cambridge University Press.
- Nodl, Martin (2022). "Royal Weddings and Divorces". In Šmahel, František; Nodl, Martin; Žůrek, Václav (eds.). Festivities, Ceremonies, and Rituals in the Lands of the Bohemian Crown in the Late Middle Ages. Brill Publishers.
- Patrouch, Joseph F. (2013). "Bella gerant alii Laodamia's Sisters, Habsburg Brides: Leaving Home for the Sake of the House". In Cruz, Anne J.; Stampino, Maria Galli (eds.). Early Modern Habsburg Women: Transnational Contexts, Cultural Conflicts, Dynastic Continuities. Routledge.
- Sedlar, Jean W. (1994). East Central Europe in the Middle Ages, 1000–1500. Vol. III. University of Washington Press.
- Schmidt, Ondřej (2019). John of Moravia between the Czech Lands and the Patriarchate of Aquileia (ca. 1345–1394). Brill Publishers.
- Duczmal, Małgorzata (2010). Ryksa Piastówna. Królowa Czech i Polski (1st ed.). Wydawnictwo Manuskrypt. ISBN 83-923110-1-9.

Wenceslaus II of Bohemia Přemyslid dynasty Born: 27 September 1271 Died: 21 June 1305
Regnal titles
Preceded by Ottokar II	King of Bohemia; 1278 – 1305	Succeeded by Wenceslaus III
Preceded by Przemysl II	King of Poland; 1296 – 1305	Succeeded by Wenceslaus III
