= Przemysł II =

King of Poland from 1295 to 1296

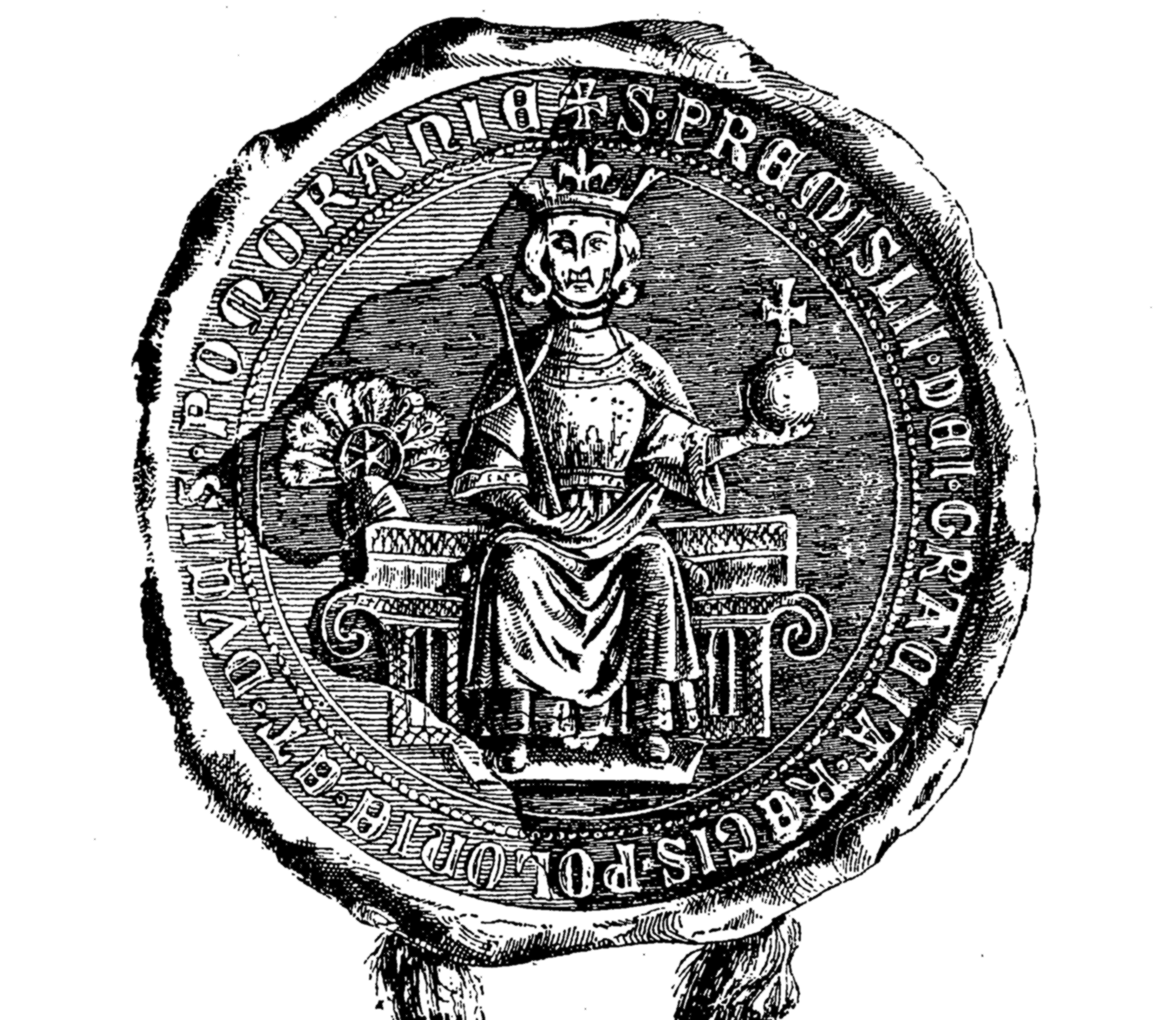
- Seal depicting the enthroned Przemysł II with royal regalia, 1296

King of Poland
- Reign: 1295 – 1296
- Coronation: 26 June 1295 at Gniezno Cathedral
- Predecessor: Bolesław II the Bold
- Successor: Wenceslaus II of Bohemia

High Duke of Poland
- Reign: 1290 – 1291
- Predecessor: Henry Probus
- Successor: Wenceslaus II of Bohemia

Duke of Greater Poland
- Reign: 1279 – 1296
- Predecessor: Przemysl I of Greater Poland
- Successor: Władysław I Łokietek
- Born: 14 October 1257; Poznań, Kingdom of Poland
- Died: 8 February 1296 (aged 38); Rogoźno, Kingdom of Poland
- Burial: at Archcathedral Basilica of St. Peter and St. Paul, Poznań
- Spouse: Ludgarda of Mecklenburg; Richeza of Sweden; Margaret of Brandenburg
- Issue: Elizabeth Richeza, Queen of Poland and Bohemia
- House: Piast dynasty
- Father: Przemysł I of Greater Poland
- Mother: Elisabeth of Wrocław
- Religion: Roman Catholic

Przemysł II (Polish: [ˈpʂɛmɨsw] also given in English and Latin as Premyslas or Premislaus or in Polish as Przemysław; 14 October 1257 – 8 February 1296) was the Duke of Poznań from 1257 (Note: Only nominal; he actually took over the government of Poznań in 1273, aged sixteen.)–1279, of Greater Poland from 1279 to 1296, of Kraków from 1290 to 1291, (Note: Only nominal (without actually reigning in the district) but used the title even in subsequent years, for example, on the occasion of the congress in Kalisz in 1293.) and Gdańsk Pomerania (Pomerelia) from 1294 to 1296, and then King of Poland from 1295 until his death. After a long period of Polish high dukes and two nominal kings, he was the first to obtain the hereditary title of king, and thus to return Poland to the rank of kingdom. A member of the Greater Poland branch of the House of Piast as the only son of Duke Przemysł I and the Silesian Princess Elisabeth, he was born posthumously; for this reason he was brought up at the court of his uncle Bolesław the Pious and received his own district to rule, the Duchy of Poznań in 1273. Six years later, after the death of his uncle, he also obtained the Duchy of Kalisz.

In the first period of his government, Przemysł II was involved only in regional affairs, first in close collaboration and then competing with the Duke of Wrocław, Henry Probus. This policy caused the rebellion of the prominent Zaremba family and the temporary loss of Wieluń. Working with the Archbishop of Gniezno, Jakub Świnka, he sought the unification of the principalities of the Piast dynasty. Unexpectedly, in 1290, under the will of Henry Probus, he managed to obtain the Duchy of Kraków and with this the title of High Duke of Poland; however, not having sufficient support from the local nobility (who supported another member of the Piast dynasty, Władysław I Łokietek) and faced with the increasing threats of King Wenceslaus II of Bohemia, Przemysł II finally decided to retreat from Lesser Poland, which was then under the rule of Přemyslid dynasty.

In 1293, thanks to the mediation of Archbishop Jakub Świnka, he joined a close alliance with the Kuyavian princes Władysław the Elbow-high and Casimir II of Łęczyca. This alliance was anti-Bohemian, and his goal was to recover Kraków, then in the hands of King Wenceslaus II.

After the death of Duke Mestwin II in 1294, and according to the Treaty of Kępno signed in 1282, Przemysł II inherited Pomerelia. This strengthened his position and enabled his coronation as King of Poland. The ceremony was held on 26 June 1295 in Gniezno, and was performed by his ally Archbishop Jakub Świnka. Only nine months later, on 8 February 1296, Przemysł II was murdered during a failed kidnapping attempt made by men of the Margraves of Brandenburg, with some help from the Polish noble families of Nałęcz and Zaremba.

== Birth and naming ==
Przemysł II was born on 14 October 1257 in Poznań as the fifth child and only son of Duke Przemysł I of Greater Poland and his wife Elisabeth of Wrocław, daughter of Duke Henry II the Pious of Silesia. It is known that he was born in the morning, because according to the Chronicle of Greater Poland, when Dowager Duchess Elisabeth gave birth to a son, the vicars and canons of the city were singing morning prayers. At the news of the birth, the local clergy chanted the Te Deum laudamus. Shortly after his birth, the prince was baptized by the Bishop of Poznań, Bogufał III.

According to the Chronicle of Greater Poland (Kronika wielkopolska), Przemysł II was named after his father, who had died four months before his birth, on 4 June 1257. The form of the name in the days of his contemporaries certainly sounded like Przemysł or possibly Przemyśl. However, due to the fact that the word "Przemysł" (English: Industry) means production of a good or service within an economy today, it is reasonable to be considered that his name could be a valid form from Przemysław, especially as this version is undoubtedly more medieval (occurs at the beginning of the 14th century). (Note: Especially if it is compared with the analogous case of the name Władysław, who in earlier sources is in the form Włodzisław, possibly Włodko. See K. Jasinski: Genealogia Piastów wielkopolskich. Potomstwo Władysława Odonica, [in:] Nasi Piastowie (Kronika Miasta Poznania, nr 2/95), Poznań 1995, pp. 39–40.) Another name under which the Duke of Greater Poland was probably known, following the indications of the Rocznik Kołbacki, is Peter (Polish: Piotr), but Oswald Balzer considered this an obvious mistake. The only historian who recognised the name Peter as authentic was K. Górski.

No sources about contemporary rulers provided information about a nickname. Only in sources related to the Teutonic Order from 1335, he is given the nickname Kynast. In current historiography he is sometimes nicknamed Posthumous (Polish: Pogrobowiec), but this has not been universally accepted.

== Tutelage of Bolesław the Pious (1257–1273) ==
=== Childhood ===
At the time of his birth, Przemysł II was the nominal ruler of the Duchy of Poznań. The guardianship of the Duchy, probably along with his mother Elisabeth, (Note: However, it did not encompass the proper Governorship of the Duchy of Poznań, contenting herself with the direct rule over only her dower land, the village of Modrze.) was taken by his uncle, Duke Bolesław the Pious and his wife, the Hungarian princess Jolenta (Helena). In consequence, the prince remained at the court in Poznań, where his mother raised him. On 16 January 1265 Dowager Duchess Elisabeth died at her estate in Modrze, and the orphaned Przemysł together with his sisters were later cared for by their uncle.

Very little information exists about the education given to Przemysł II. Diplomatic sources have retained only the names of two of his teachers: Dragomir and Przybysław. (Note: Their names appeared on a document granted by Bolesław the Pious on 8 November 1267. This document is also the first mention of Przemysł II. See Codex diplomaticus Poloniae, vol. I, nr 52 and A. Swieżawski: Przemysł. Król Polski, Warsaw 2006, pp. 92–93.) It is assumed (although without any direct evidence) that the prince had some knowledge of at least Latin in speech and writing. (Note: Indirect proof may be that such language skills were inherited from his father Przemysł I.)

=== Relations with Brandenburg and Neumark ===
The next mention of Przemysł II came in 1272, when his uncle, Duke Bolesław the Pious, appointed him the nominal commander of an armed expedition against Brandenburg. The true commanders of the expedition were the Governor of Poznań, Przedpełk and the Castellan of Kalisz, Janko. The expedition was launched on 27 May; in addition to the specific purpose to acquire and destroy the newly built fortress in Strzelce Krajeńskie (or, in case it proved to be impossible, at least the desolation of Neumark). The young prince was to be educated in the art of war. The project, as detailed in the Chronicle of Greater Poland, was a great success. The city of Strzelce Krajeńskie, after a short but extremely fierce battle, was defeated and captured by the Greater Poland army. According to the Chronicle, while gaining command of the fortress, Przemysł II ordered the slaughter of the defenders, and only the intervention of the Polish knights saved the lives of the few survivors (Note: Some historians, such as A. Swieżawski: Przemysł. Król Polski, Warsaw 2006, pp. 93–94 or Z. Boras, Przemysław II. 700-lecie koronacji, Międzychód 1995, pp. 19–20, believe that in fact only a small part of the defense was actually killed during the acquisition of the fortress, and the survivors of the Greater Poland army, as suggested by Jan Długosz, were those who saved Przemysł II's life.)

Shortly after completing the expedition and with the majority of his forces in his way back, Przemysł II received a confidential message that the fortress of Drezdenko was protected by only a few German knights. The young prince, despite the fact that he only had a part of his forces, decided to make a quick attack. This completely surprised the defenders and fearing the same fate as soldiers from Strzelce Krajeńskie, they decided to surrender the fortress in exchange for a full pardon. After this, Przemysł II took the fortress in the name of his uncle and triumphantly returned home.

In the same year, Przemysł II concluded his first alliance with Duke Mestwin II of Pomerelia. At first an ally of the Margraves of Brandenburg, Mestwin II could expel his brother and uncles from Pomerania and became sole ruler in 1271, but shortly after he was defeated and even imprisoned by them; this caused him to cede the province of Gdańsk to Margrave Conrad of Brandenburg in exchange for aid against his foes. Despite Mestwin II retaining the feudal sovereignty over the territory, the Brandenburg Margraviate still occupied the main castles and fortresses of the city even after the restoration of Mestwin II to the ducal throne. With his knowledge that his forces are too weak against Brandenburg, the Pomeranian Duke decided then to make an alliance with the Greater Poland rulers, Bolesław the Pious (who was probably his first-cousin) (Note: Hedwig, mother of Bolesław the Pious, was probably a daughter of Duke Mestwin I of Pomerelia.) and Przemysł II.

The Greater Poland-Pomerania alliance ended up regaining the fortresses in Gdańsk and the complete expulsion of the Brandenburg forces from Pomerania. Although soon after Mestwin II decided to conclude a separate peace with the Margraviate, the alliance with Greater Poland signed in 1272 remained in force. The continuous threat of Brandenburg and the uncertainty of the alliance with Mestwin II caused Bolesław the Pious to begin to seek new allies in case of war. For this purpose, Bolesław decided to seek an agreement with Duke Barnim I of Pomerania.

=== First marriage ===
As a part of the new alliance with Pomerania, marriage was arranged between Przemysł II and Barnim I's granddaughter Ludgarda, (Note: In contemporary sources, her name is variously recorded as Lucardis, Lucartha or Lukeria. See B. Nowacki: Przemysł II, książę wielkopolski, król Polski 1257–1295, Poznań 1995, p. 54.) daughter of Henry I the Pilgrim, Lord of Mecklenburg and Anastasia of Pomerania. Apparently, the young prince was pleased with his young bride, (Note: It is unknown how many years Ludgarda had at the time of the wedding. Based on indirect sources, historians accept that she could be born around 1259 (B. Nowacki: Przemysł II książę wielkopolski, król Polski 1257–1295, Poznań 1995, p. 54), in 1260 or 1261 (K. Jasiński: Genealogia Piastów wielkopolskich. Potomstwo Władysława Odonica, [in:] Nasi Piastowie "Kronika Miasta Poznania", nr 2/95, Poznań 1995, p. 54), and finally, about 1261 (A. Swieżawski: Przemysł. Król Polski, Warsaw 2006, p. 94). In consequence, the Mecklenburg princess would be around 13–15 years at that time.) as stated in the Chronicle of Greater Poland:

« And when he saw her, he liked her person. And there in the country of the said Duke Barnim, in the city of Szczecin, took her as a wife. And this happened in his sixteenth year of life (1273). »

After the wedding, the couple was briefly separated. Przemysł II came to Greater Poland, where, together with his uncle prepared the ceremonial arrival of his wife to Poznań. Finally, together with his uncle, his aunt Jolenta, Bishop Mikołaj I of Poznań and other Greater Poland dignitaries, the prince went to the border frontier in Drezdenko, where he solemnly brought Ludgarda to her new home. The alliance between Greater Poland and Pomerania was directed against Brandenburg and, in 1274, resulted in more than one retaliatory expedition against Greater Poland; taken by surprise, the princes watched how, without major obstacles, the Brandenburg army came to Poznań, and burned the main fortress of the city. Only after this, the Greater Poland knighthood was hastily organized and was able to expel the invaders.

== Independent Duke of Poznań (1273–1279) ==
=== Rebellion ===
In 1273, Przemysł II became an independent Duke of Poznań. The circumstances around this event are not entirely clear. (Note: Also, historiography is not consistent in this regard, and additional confusion exists around the order of events. K. Jasinski, Przemysł II, [in:] Polish Biographical Dictionary, Vol XXVIII, Wrocław 1984–1985, p. 730, and K. Ożóg: Przemysł II, [in:] Piastowie. Leksykon biograficzny, Kraków 1999, pp. 154–155, reports that firstly Przemysł II received its own district, and then, according to the will of Bolesław the Pious, married Ludgarda of Mecklenburg. Information about the rebellion against his uncle (discussed below), however, seems to suggest that in fact it was the opposite, ie, the prince firstly married Ludgarda, and then, dissatisfied with the lack of influence in the government affairs, rebelled to receive his own patrimony, and as a result, he obtained the Duchy of Poznań. This sequence of events is supported by B. Nowacki: Przemysł II książę wielkopolski, król Polski 1257–1295, Poznań 1995, pp. 54–58 and A. Swieżawski: Przemysł. Król Polski, Warsaw 2006, pp. 95–96.) On the basis of only one known source, a document dated 1 October 1273, it appears that Przemysł II began to use the title of "dux Poloniae" (Duke of [Greater] Poland). A document issued on 25 August 1289 notes that the Greater Poland ruler gave the villages of Węgielnice and Łagiewnice to the mayor of Gniezno, Piotr Winiarczyk, in gratitude for helping him to escape from the Gniezno fortress (however, when the incident took place wasn't mentioned in the document). In light of modern historiography, the events preceding the issue of this document could be as follows: Przemysł II, unhappy with the prolonged guardianship of his uncle, and with the support of some powerful Greater Poland magnates (Note: It is unknown who these people were. It only assumes that they could be the young prince's closest associates during his government over the Duchy of Poznań in 1273–1279. They were: the Governor of Poznań Benjamin Zaremba, the Chancellor and later Bishop of Poznań Andrzej Zaremba, the esquire Pietrzyk, the Poznań Chamberlain Bogusław Domaradzic Grzymał, the Prince's notary Tylon, his confessor Theodoric, and the incumbent Bishop of Poznań Mikołaj I. See B. Nowacki: Przemysł II książę wielkopolski, król Polski 1257–1295, Poznań 1995, pp. 58–59.) decided, regardless of the consequences, to assert his rights over Poznań. It is unclear at this stage whether there have been any armed incidents; in any case, the demands of Przemysł II became so insistent that they ended in his imprisonment in the Gniezno castle. It can be assumed that there wasn't a prison in the proper sense of the word, but under house arrest, during which Przemysł II was not too rigorously guarded, since the prince was able to escape from the castle without any outside help. In a document issued to Piotr Winiarczyk, the writer used the phrase "qui de nocte consurgens", which supports the assumption that the clerk was asleep and was completely surprised by the arrival of the prince. In any case, the real cause of this grant of lands given to Winiarczyk by Przemysł II apparently wasn't certain, and probably only equipping him with sufficient means to escape.

=== Alliance with Henry Probus ===
After escaping from Gniezno, Przemysł II probably went on Lower Silesia under the care of Henry Probus, Duke of Wrocław. This help was evidenced by the conclusion of an alliance (in unknown date) directed against "any man and Polish prince" with the exception of Duke Vladislaus I of Opole and King Ottokar II of Bohemia. (Note: This alliance was known only from a write-down document without date and place of origin, and the issue of giving a chronological time to that document is quite complicated (years 1273–1278 during the rule of Przemysł II over Poznań). The analysis of the events suggests that the most possible date could be half of 1273. Cf. A. Swieżawski: Przemysł. Król Polski, Warsaw 2006, p. 96. Other historians (for example, B. Nowacki: Przemysł II książę wielkopolski, król Polski 1257–1295, Poznań 1995, pp. 59–61) give as date for the conclusion of the alliance the year 1276.)

An alliance between Przemysł II and Henry Probus placed Bolesław the Pious in a very uncomfortable situation, because he was a member of the Pro-Hungarian coalition of Polish princes (in addition to him, it included Bolesław V the Chaste, Leszek II the Black and Konrad II of Masovia) could not remain indifferent to this close cooperation with the Duke of Wrocław, which was the leader of the Pro-bohemian coalition (where other Silesian princes also belonged). (Note: Here is further related the long-term conflict between the Kingdoms of Hungary and Bohemia after the fall of the Babenberg dynasty, who ended with the defeat of Przemyśl Otakar II in the Battle on the Marchfeld in 1278. Should be remembered, however, that after 1273 the Polish princes who were on the Hungarian side changed their politics unexpectedly and transferred their loyalty to the Bohemian side (probably due to the inability to find cooperation with the regency that ruled Hungary on behalf of the young King Ladislaus IV). More about this conflict can be seen in: A. Barciak: Ideologia polityczna monarchii Przemysła Ottokara II. Studium z dziejów czeskiej polityki zagranicznej w drugiej połowie XIII wieku, Katowice 1982.)

This alliance probably forced Bolesław the Pious to reconsider his treatment of his nephew and finally granted him the Duchy of Poznań in 1273. Przemysł II, in exchange, not only interrupted for a time his cooperation with the Duke of Wrocław, but decided to support his uncle in the expedition against Władysław of Opole (ally of King Ottokar II and Henry Probus), in retaliation for the attempts of the Opole ruler to overthrow the government of Bolesław V the Chaste in Lesser Poland during the first half of 1273. Thus, with high probability, it can be concluded that by this time, the conflict between Przemysł II and his uncle for power has been finally resolved.

Very little information exists about the rule of Przemysł II over Poznań. From the period 1273–1279, only four documents issued by the prince are known, including two issued jointly with his uncle Bolesław the Pious.

=== Conflict with Bolesław the Horned ===
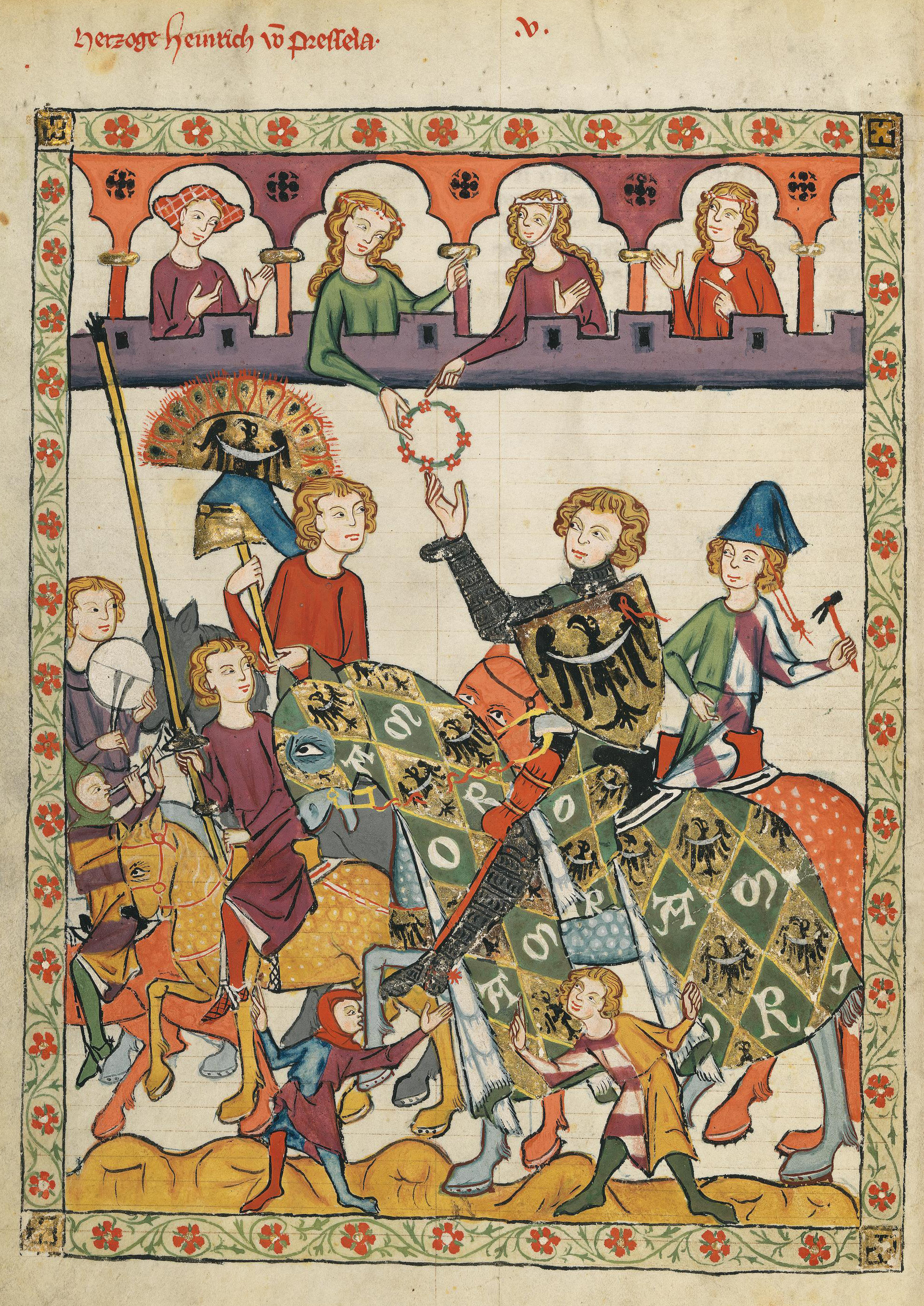
Henry Probus, Duke of Wrocław. Codex Manesse, ca. 1305

Przemysł II's foreign politics are more well known during this time. His friendly relations with Henry IV Probus survived, despite the momentary interruption, even after 1273. This alliance was maintained without significant changes, and only as a result of the events that took place on 18 February 1277 in the town of Jelcz near Wrocław, the Duke of Poznań was forced to explicitly stand at the side of the Wrocław ruler, his cousin. (Note: Henry III the White (Henry Probus' father) was the brother of Duchess Elisabeth of Poznań (Przemysł II's mother)). Henry Probus was kidnapped and imprisoned in the Legnica Castle by his uncle, Duke Bolesław II the Horned. The pretext used by the Duke of Legnica to do this was the demands of the Duke of Wrocław over one-third of his domains, which, according to him, were part of his inheritance as legacy from both his father Henry III the White (died in 1266) and uncle Ladislaus of Salzburg (died in 1270). Bolesław used in his favour the political weakness of Henry Probus' guardian, King Otakar II of Bohemia, who in September 1276 was forced to submit to King Rudolf I of Germany.

Przemysł II, faithful to his previous agreements with Henry Probus, decided to stand at the head of the knights of Poznań, Wrocław (which generally were loyal to their ruler) and Głogów (commanded by Duke Henry III) and marched to Legnica in order to obtain the freedom of Henry IV. The Legnica army was commanded by Bolesław and his eldest son Henry V the Fat. The battle took place on 24 April 1277 in the village of Stolec near Ząbkowice Śląskie, and, according to modern historiography, was extremely bloody and lasted almost the entire day. Initially, it seemed that the coalition Poznań-Głogów-Wrocław would have a complete victory. The situation became even more favorable to them when Bolesław escaped from the battlefield. However, his son Henry V decided to stay until the end, and in this desperate situation encouraged his knights to fight and finally obtain the victory; to complete the success, even Przemysł II and Henry III were taken prisoners. (Note: Modern historiography (for example K. Ożóg: Przemysł II [in:] Piastowie. Leksykon biograficzny, Kraków 1999, p. 155; B. Nowacki: Przemysł II książę wielkopolski, król Polski 1257–1295, Poznań 1995, pp. 67–69 and A. Swieżawski: Przemysł. Król Polski, Warsaw 2006, p. 99) considered the capture of Przemysł II as doubtful, because only Jan Długosz reports this and other contemporary sources are silent about this event.) However, according to Jan Długosz in his chronicle, for the Dukes of Legnica this was a Pyrrhic victory, since "died in this battle so countless number of people that the knights of Legnica, although the winner, they could mock the vanquished, because the blood paid for victory". The imprisonment of the Duke of Poznań, if it occurred, was brief. The argument against this was noted in the fact that there is no record of Przemysł II having to pay for his release.

Whatever the truth was, by 5 July 1277, Przemysł II was in Lubin. The release of Henry Probus took place some days later, on 22 July, after the surrender to Bolesław II of 1/5 of his Duchy, with the town of Środa Śląska at the head. Bolesław the Pious was against the participation of his nephew in this conflict; he not only refused to support him militarily but also invaded the borders of the Duchy of Wrocław, trying to assert financial claims. Moreover, at this point, he gave his daughter Elizabeth in marriage to Henry V the Fat.

An additional reason for a quick end to this conflict among the Silesian princes was the personal intervention of King Ottokar II of Bohemia, who in preparation for his final confrontation with King Rudolph I of Habsburg German needed to calm the situation in Poland. (Note: At the same time, he issued a proclamation addressed to the Polish, in which he emphasized the brotherhood between the two nations and a common threat from Germany.)

=== Cooperation with Bohemia ===
In September 1277 King Ottokar II held in the border city of Opava a meeting of Polish princes. Sources don't specify either the exact date or the participants. Historians speculate only that they could be: Henry Probus, Bolesław V the Chaste, Leszek II the Black, Władysław of Opole with his sons, Henry III of Głogów and Przemysł II. Several political decisions were made during the meeting, most notably military actions against Germany.

The decisive battle between Ottokar II and Rudolph I took place on 25 August 1278 in the known Battle on the Marchfeld. As many 1/3 of the Czech army was supposed to be allied with the Polish troops. Przemysł II wasn't among them, because he was then in Ląd. However, this doesn't mean that, as historians speculate, he didn't send troops to the Bohemian King as was planned.

=== Reconciliation with Bolesław the Pious ===
The apparent difference of interests between Przemysł II and his uncle Bolesław the Pious in the Silesian and Czech affairs did not disturb their good relations. Evidence of this was the common issuance of documents, such as 6 January 1278.

Another proof of the close cooperation between uncle and nephew in the last years of Bolesław the Pious' life is in the events that took place in mid-1278 (probably in August): (Note: Mature historiography moved Bolesław's expedition to the end of May or early June. See W. Rybczyński: Wielkopolska pod rządami synów Władysława Odonica (1235–1279), [in:] "Rocznik Filarecki", I, 1886, pp. 316–317.) Bolesław, using the weakness of the Margraviate of Brandenburg during the fight between Ottokar II and Rudolph I, in only eight days attacked Neumark and advanced until Myślibórz, where his troops defeated Margrave Otto V the Long.

Przemysł II didn't participate in this expedition (at least directly, according to Jan Długosz), because at that moment he was in Ląd, according to a document dated 24 August 1278. (Note: A completely different date is fixed by J. Tęgowski: W sprawie emendacji dokumentu Przemysła II dotyczącego powrotu Siemomysła na Kujawy, "Zapiski Kujawsko-Dobrzyńskie", serie A, 1978, pp. 213–219. He draws attention to the possibility of a mistake in the date of the document and the correct year of publication would be 1279. However, no other sources confirmed this and Tęgowski's thesis remains only a hypothesis.) Certainly by the command of his uncle, (Note: Przemysł II had then only less than 20 years. It seems obvious that with the much olders Leszek II the Black and Ziemomysł of Inowrocław not have asked for his direct arbitration but rather to his uncle Bolesław, who (perhaps due to his war against Brandenburg or wanting to raise the prestige of his nephew), declined his participation in the meeting by sending Przemysł II with a retinue of experienced advisors: Maciej, Castellan of Kalisz; Bodzenta, Castellan of Ladz; Andrzej, Castellan of Nakielsk; Bodzęta, Castellan of Gieck; Bierwołt, Castellan of Lędzki and the Gniezno knight Bogumil. Przemysł II acted as mediator in the dispute between Dukes Leszek II the Black and Ziemomysł of Inowrocław and his subjects.) The dispute was because of the close ties between Ziemomysł and the Teutonic Order, at the expense of the local noble families. Early in 1271, Ziemomysł had suffered the rebellion of his subjects and had lost his Duchy of Inowrocław, which was placed under the guardianship of both Bolesław the Pious and Leszek II the Black.

Przemysł II was able to end the dispute between Leszek and Ziemomysł with the local nobility definitively. The Duke of Inowrocław had to agree to two conditions: firstly, in his court, all the noble families would be well tolerated and respected, and secondly, he would put a distance from his German advisors. In addition, Ziemomysł also had to accept the surrender of the towns of Kruszwica and Radziejów to Bolesław the Pious and Wyszogród to Duke Mestwin II of Pomerelia. The friendly relations between Przemysł II and the Kuyavia Dukes proved to be durable and survived to the end of his reign. (Note: Not taking into account the later tense relations between Przemysł II and Władysław I the Elbow-high during his brief reign in Kraków. The friendly relations with the descendants of Casimir I of Kuyavia with the Greater Poland ruler were reflected, as some historians believed in the name chosen to Ziemomysł's second son, Przemysł, during his exile in Ląd. S. Sroka: Przemysł II, [in:] Piastowie. Leksykon biograficzny, Kraków 1999, p. 223.) The expedition against Brandenburg in 1278 was the last important event in Bolesław the Pious' life. "Maximus trumphator de Teutonicis" (in: The highest winner on the Germans, (Note: Described in this was by the Rocznik kaliski. See. B. Nowacki: Przemysł II książę wielkopolski, król Polski 1257–1295, Poznań 1995, p. 79.)) died on 13 or 14 April 1279 in Kalisz. Without male heirs, shortly before his death he declared his nephew his only and legitimate heir and urged him to take care of his wife Jolenta-Helena and his two underage daughters, Hedwig and Anna.

== Duke of Greater Poland (1279–1290) ==
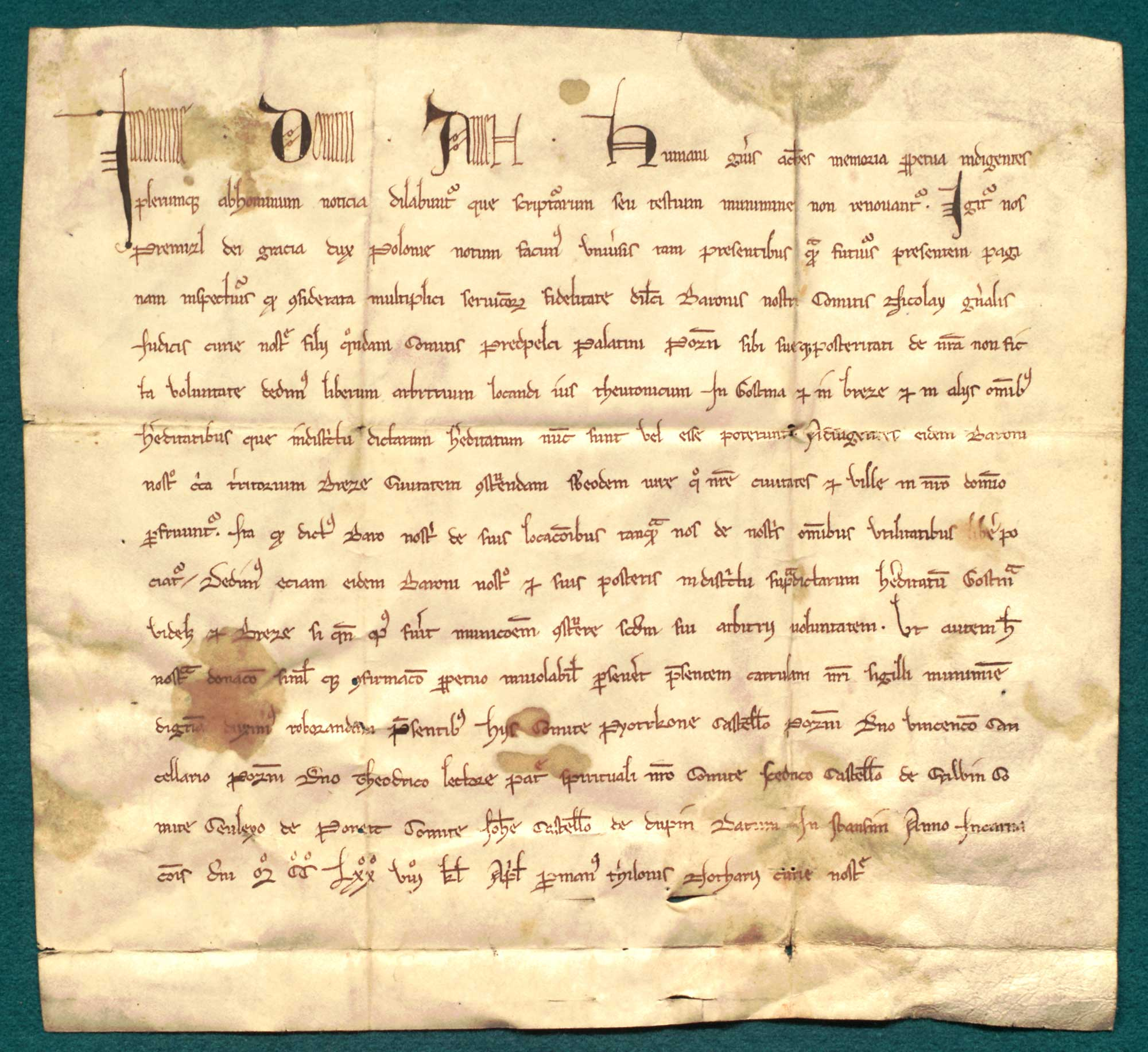
Przemysł II allows the location of cities Gostyń and Brzezie on Magdeburg rights, a document from 1278.

=== Acquisition of Greater Poland ===
The inheritance of Greater Poland by Przemysł II went peacefully. The union proved to be durable, and with the exception of its borders with the Duchy of Wrocław, it survived throughout his reign. However, despite the personal unification of the territory, the division between Kalisz and Gniezno persisted almost to the end of the 18th century. Later, in times of Casimir III the Great, there was also a visible division between the old voivodeships of Poznań and Kalisz.

=== Relations with nobility and neighbors ===
An analysis of the contemporary documents showed that in the first period of his rule over all Greater Poland, Przemysł II relied on the following nobles: Jan Gerbicz, Bishop of Poznań; members of the powerful noble family of Zaremba: Andrzej, chancellor of Kalisz (since 1288 the first "cancellerius tocius Polonia") and later Bishop of Poznań; Sędziwój, chamberlain of Gniezno; Beniamin, voivode of Poznań; and Arkembold, voivode of Gniezno. Other close collaborators were Wojciech Krystanowicz z Lubrzy, chamberlain of Poznań; Tomisław Nałęcz, Poznań castellan; Maciej, Kalisz castellan; Stefan, Wieluń castellan, Mikołaj Łodzia, Poznań judge; Wincenty Łodzia, chancellor of Poznań; and the brothers Tylon, Jaśko and Mikołaj, three notaries of middle-class origin.

During the years 1279–1281, Przemysł II had a rather friendly (or at least neutral) relationship with all of his immediate neighbors. (Note: During 1278, Greater Poland had constant conflicts with the Margraviate of Brandenburg. After this year, none of the parties undertook further hostilities. In subsequent years, there were even warming relations. In addition, the Duke of Greater Poland had remarkably friendly relations with Mestwin II of Pomerelia, Leszek II the Black, and since 1281 with Henry IV Probus.)

=== Imprisonment ===
The Duke of Greater Poland felt quite safe when he was invited to a meeting organized by Henry Probus. The meeting took place probably on 9 February 1281 in one of the Silesian villages; however, the Duke of Wrocław had another plan – he broke all the rules of hospitality, imprisoned the three princes who were invited (Przemysł II, Henry V the Fat of Legnica, and Henry III of Głogów), and forced them to make political concessions. This action was made even more outrageous by the fact that only four years earlier, Przemysł II and Henry III risked their lives and armies to save Henry IV Probus in the Battle of Stolec, which ended with the victory of Henry V the Fat, the third guest of this meeting. Historians speculate that the reason for the Duke of Wrocław to make this radical move was probably his desire to increase his influence over the neighboring principalities as part of his own plans for a royal coronation. (Note: The plans for a royal coronation for Henry Probus proved to be serious, and are further confirmed by a document signed in 1280 between him and his father-in-law Władysław of Opole, in which the latter requested that, in return for his help in this matter, his own daughter (wife of Henry Probus) would be crowned Queen with him. B. Nowacki)

Finally, after brief resistance, Przemysł II was forced to give the strategic Lesser Polish land of Wieluń (also known as Ruda) in order to obtain his release, because Henry IV wanted a direct connection between Wrocław and Lesser Poland. The imprisonment of Przemysł II did not last too long, because on 3 March he was documented to have been in Poznań. Henry III and Henry V the Fat were both forced to grant much larger territorial concessions. In addition, the three Dukes agreed that upon the request of the Duke of Wrocław, they would each give him military aid in the amount of thirty lancers. So this was, in practice, an act of homage.

The rapid release of Przemysł II could have been aided by the intervention of Leszek II the Black and Mestwin II of Pomerelia. The reason for the arrival of Mestwin II to Greater Poland, in addition to helping his imprisoned ally, was to settle the claims of the Teutonic Order over parts of Pomerelia and to resolve the issue of succession after his own death; from his first marriage, Mestwin II had only two daughters, Catherine and Euphemia. (Note: The situation was further complicated by the fact that Mestwin II gained the rule over all the Duchy of Pomerelia after a war against his uncles, Racibor and Sambor II, who in revenge for this willed his possessions (including Białogard and Gniew) to the Teutonic Order upon his death in 1278.)

=== Treaty of Kępno ===
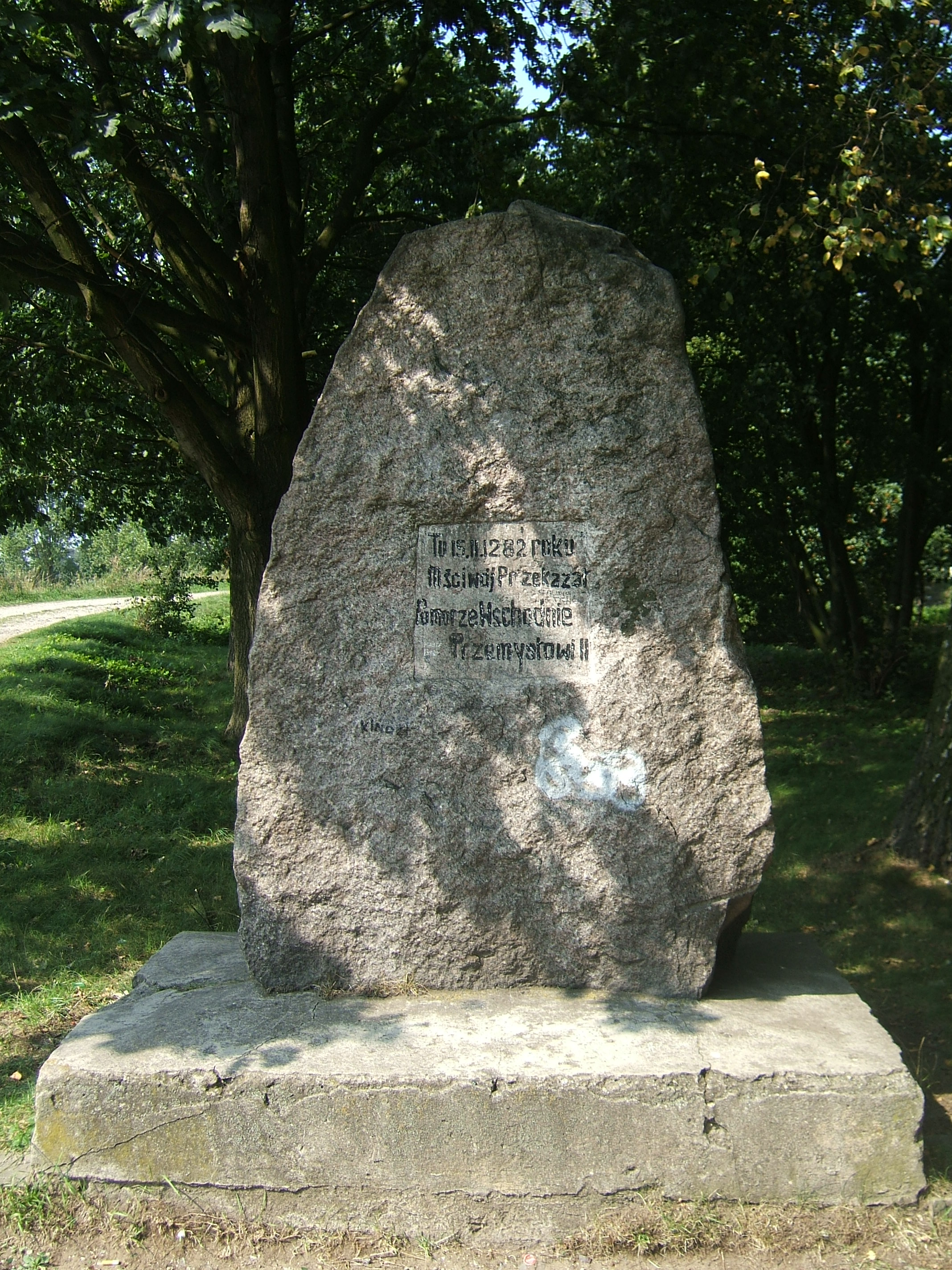
Memorial stone in the city of Kępno commemorating the treaty between Przemysł II and Mestwin II

The first talks between Przemysł II and Mestwin II about the latter's succession probably occurred around 1281, on the occasion of the arrival of the Duke of Pomerelia in Greater Poland to visit the Benedictine Abbey in Lubin. Although there is no direct evidence that Przemysł II was also in the Abbey in person, the presence of Jan I of Wysokowce, Bishop of Poznań and other Greater Poland dignitaries suggests that a compromise was then suggested. At the beginning of the next year, Mestwin II again went to southern Greater Poland, in order to talk with the Papal legate Filippo di Fermo about his dispute with the Teutonic Order over the possession of the towns of Gniew and Białogard. The legate stayed in Milicz, which belonged to the Diocese of Wrocław. Due to the friendly relations of Przemysł II (and thus his ally Mestwin II) with Henry IV Probus, the Duke of Pomerania decided to stop at the frontier village of Kępno (also in the Diocese of Wrocław), and waited to hear the legate's verdict. (Note: The case ended unsuccessfully for Mestwin II: the legate's verdict, issued in the name of Pope Martin IV on 18 May in Milicz, forced the Duke of Pomerelia to transfer Gniew to the Teutonic Order. Białogard remained in Pomerelia, but in return, the Duke had to give a few villages in the Ait in compensation)

In Kępno, Mestwin II probably expected the arrival of the Duke of Greater Poland. (Note: The selection of the frontier village of Kępno as a place of meeting could have had a double purpose: first, it might have been to facilitate contact with Papal legate Filippo di Fermo, then in Milicz (K. Zielińska: Zjednoczenie Pomorza Gdańskiego z Wielkopolska pod koniec XIII w. Umowa kępińska 1282 r., Toruń 1968, p. 51), and second, it could have been a political demonstration by Przemysł II directed against Henry Probus (B. Nowacki: Przemysł II, książę wielkopolski, król Polski 1257–1295. Poznań 1995, p. 88).) Here, on 15 February 1282, a treaty was concluded between Przemysł II and Mestwin II, which secured the future unification of Gdańsk Pomerania and Greater Poland. Witnesses in the signed document, among others, were Pomeranian Voivode Waysil, Poznań voivode Beniamin, Gniezno voivode Arkembold, Poznań judge Mikołaj, Kalisz judge Andrzej, and the Dominican friar Piotr (later Prince-Bishop of Cammin from 1296 to 1298), who was possibly responsible for writing the text. Other important dignitaries might have been present in Kępno at the time; however, they are not mentioned.

There are ongoing disputes between historians about the exact nature of the Treaty of Kępno. According to some historians (for example, Balzer and Wojciechowski) the treaty was a classic pact of mutual inheritance, in which the one who survives the other inherits his territory. According to others (like Kętrzyński, Baszkiewicz, Zielinska, Nowacki and Swieżawski), it was a one-sided arrangement or donation for life from Mestwin II to Przemysł II (called donatio inter vivos). Another theory was posed by Janusz Bieniak. He believed that Mestwin II simply paid homage for his lands to the ruler of Greater Poland, who became the de jure ruler of the territory. Currently, the second theory is the most accepted, mainly because it agrees entirely with the contemporary sources. Since 1282, Przemysł II formally used the title of "dux Pomeranie" (Duke of Pomerania), but during Mestwin II's life, he renounced his claim to the rights over Gdańsk Pomerania (Pomerelia).

As was customary, the treaty would have to be approved by the nobles and knights of both lands. The meeting between the nobility of Pomerelia and Greater Poland took place between 13 and 15 September 1284 in the town of Nakło, where they confirmed the rights of Przemysł II over Gdańsk Pomerania. The unification of Pomerelia and Greater Poland was not the only decision made by Przemysł II and Mestwin II. The favors shown by the Duke of Pomerelia to the powerful witnesses of the agreement from Greater Poland showed that they were also keenly interested in the close integration of the two lands.

=== Widowhood ===
In December 1283 in Gniezno, at the age of 22 or 23 years, Ludgarda, wife of Przemysł II, died unexpectedly. (Note: The exact date of death of the Duchess of Greater Poland is unknown; it is only corroborated that she was buried on 14 December 1283 in Gniezno Cathedral. The contemporary sources who certify this are Roznik Traski, [in:] MPH, vol. II, p. 849, and Rocznik Małopolski, [in:] MPH, vol. III, p. 182. Only Jan Długosz stated that Ludgarda died in Poznań, and her date of death is precisely 14 December; J. Długosz: Annales seu cronicae incliti Regni Poloniae, Fr. VII, Warsaw 1975, pp. 225–226; see also O. Balzer: Genealogia Piastów, Kraków 1895, p. 246; W. Dworzaczek: Genealogia, Warsaw 1959, table 2; K. Jasiński: Genealogia Piastów wielkopolskich. Potomstwo Władysława Odonica. [in:] Nasi Piastowie ("Kronika Miasta Poznania", nr 2/95), Poznań 1995, p. 55.) Relations between the spouses for some time before her death weren't very good; perhaps there had even been a separation between them. The reason for this was the supposed infertility of Ludgarda, more apparent after ten years of marriage. The actual period of marital intercourse between the spouses, given their age (both are quite young at the time of their wedding), could actually be shorter. Indeed, there is no direct proof about Ludgarda's barrenness beyond the lack of offspring; in those cases, the childlessness in marriage was usually considered to be the woman's fault, although in this case (due to the birth of a daughter from Przemysł II's second marriage), it seems more likely. It was not a surprise when accusations began to emerge against the Duke of Greater Poland of the suspected murder of his wife. No contemporary source mentions this, a fact more surprising because Przemysł II had bitter enemies who certainly would use this crime against him. Also, any reactions from the church or public penance would be noticed.

The first suggestion about Ludgarda's mysterious death came from the 14th century Rocznik Traski:

« In the same year, died unexpectedly the spouse of Przemysł, Duke of Greater, the daughter of Lord Nicholas of Mecklenburg, named Lukarda. Nobody could figure out how she died. »

The chronicler of the Rocznik Traski doesn't suggest an unnatural death for the Duchess, but leaves some doubts about it. The Rocznik małopolski, on the other hand, spoke clearly about Ludgarda's murder in the Szamotuły code, which added further information about this event:

« Regardless of the historian (I might add) we have seen in our youth in the streets of Gniezno a wooden chapel, which in the vernacular language is called vestibule, where exist two great stones in the shape of millstones reddened with the blood of that lady, who are completely worn and faded, and were deposited in her tomb at Gniezno cathedral. »

Another source that describes the death of Ludgarda is the Kronika oliwska, written in the mid-14th century by Abbot Stanisław. On the pages of his work, the author clearly showed aversion towards the Samborid dynasty, rulers of Pomerelia until the end of the 13th century. This aversion is also transferred to Przemysł II:

« When Prince Mestwin was buried in Oliwa, Przemysł arrived in Gdańsk and took possession of the duchy of Pomerania. Then he received from the Holy See the crown of the Polish Kingdom. He lived another year and was captured by the men of the Margrave of Brandenburg, Waldemar, who killed him to avenge the holy Lukarda, his wife, suspecting that he had strangled her. »

It is unknown why the Margraves of Brandenburg would avenge the murder of Ludgarda, since this could place them in a dangerous position, considering their alliance with Pomerelia-Greater Poland. The reports of the Kronika oliwska were repeated in Mecklenburg by chronicler Ernst von Kirchberg, a wandering bard from Thuringia, who around 1378 appears at the court of Duke Albert II of Mecklenburg (Ludgarda's nephew) on occasion of his wedding. Shortly after, von Kirchberg wanted to show his thanks for the Duke's hospitality and wrote a long rhyming poem, in which he also mentions Ludgarda. The story of the chronicler was as follows: Przemysł II, at the instigation of his mother Elizabeth of Wrocław (who is well known to have died in 1265, a long time before the marriage of her son), asked his wife for a divorce and returned her to Mecklenburg. In view of her refusal because "What God has joined, men must not divide", Przemysł II decided her imprisonment in the tower, where he tried to persuade her again to accept a divorce. Finally, due to her obstinacy, Przemysł II killed her with his own dagger. In this event, he was helped by one of his ministers, who finished the deed by suffocating a dying Ludgarda with a towel.

The last important source for the history of Ludgarda is Annals of Jan Długosz, who wrote about these events almost two centuries after (around 1480). Długosz was the first chronicler who locates Poznań as the place of Ludgarda's death. Besides, he established her date of death on 14 December, which is corroborated by contemporary sources as a date of her burial. Modern historiography generally supports the complete innocence of Przemysł II in the sudden death of his wife.

Based on the findings of Brygida Kürbis, it can be concluded that the 10-year marriage of Przemysł II and Ludgarda wasn't successful, and over time, it became more obvious to everyone that the ducal couple was unable to have children, although this couldn't be completely certain, because Ludgarda in 1283 was at most only 23 years old. Nevertheless, it is assumed that Przemysł II's growing aversion to his wife because of her infertility was well known by all. So when in mid-December 1283 Ludgarda died suddenly and separated (evidenced by her death in Gniezno, away from Przemysł II's court in Poznań), raising suspicion that the death of the duchess was unnatural. Nobody, however, had evidence of this. Contributing to rumors was the fact that in the 13th century, medical knowledge was negligible, and therefore, the sudden death of a young person was often interpreted as unnatural. In addition, the duke's rejection of a proper mourning for his wife, who was universally liked, increased the suspicions against Przemysł II.

=== Archbishopric of Gniezno ===
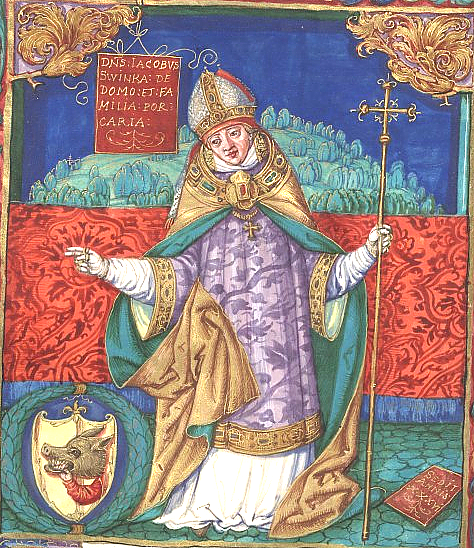
Jakub Świnka, Archbishop of Gniezno, from a book illumination, before 1535

On 18 December 1283, a few days after Ludgarda's funeral, Greater Poland witnessed an extremely important event for the later history of Poland: the consecration of Jakub Świnka as Archbishop of Gniezno. The event took place in the Franciscan church in Kalisz and was extremely important because after twelve years (since the death in 1271 of Archbishop Janusz Tarnowa) Poland wasn't a fully recognized prelate. Jakub Świnka received the papal nomination on 30 July 1283; however, because he was only a deacon, it was necessary to ordain him. This ceremony took place on 18 December and a day later, Jakub received the episcopal consecration. The ceremony, according to sources, was assisted by five Polish bishops and Przemysł II, who gave the new archbishop an expensive ring as a gift.

Little is known about the origin and early years of Jakub Świnka, except for his mention in a document issued by Bolesław the Pious. As the Archbishop of Gniezno, the cooperation between him and Przemysł II was excellent. One example of this was that he appeared as a witness in 14 diplomats issued by the Duke of Greater Poland, including the confirmation of all his existing privileges and the permission to mint his own coins in Żnin and the castellany of Ląd.

=== War against Western Pomerania ===
In the first half of 1284, Przemysł II was involved on the side of Denmark and Brandenburg in an armed conflict against Western Pomerania and Rügen. Details about this event are limited, and the peace, which was concluded on 13 August, didn't bring any real benefits to Greater Poland.

Much more positive effects would arise from Przemysł II's friendly relations with Leszek II the Black, Duke of Kraków; they had a meeting in Sieradz on 20 February 1284. Details about the reason and talks of this relationship are unknown, but they would be productive, since Przemysł II decided to give the Kraków voivode Żegota three villages (Nieczajno, Wierzbiczany and Lulin). This good relations were maintained for some time, since seven months later, on 6 September, the Duke of Greater Poland mediated in a dispute between Leszek II the Black and his brother Casimir II of Łęczyca with the Teutonic Order. Przemysł II also didn't lose sight of the Pomerelian affairs, because on 13 September he had a new meeting with Mestwin II in the city of Nakło.

=== Betrayal of Sędziwój Zaremba ===
According to the Rocznik Traski (based probably on older sources now missing), on 28 September 1284, Kalisz was burned. This soon caused a series of events that threatened the power of Przemysł II. Now governor of Kalisz and in the city at the time of the fire, Sędziwój Zaremba, fearing the consequences, decided to take the Kalisz castle (apparently not damaged in the fire) and give it to Henry IV Probus. At the news of the events of Kalisz, Przemysł II reacted instantly. No later than 6 October, as attested by a document issued at that time, Przemysł II was at the head of the Greater Poland knights under the city walls. In view of the refusal of submission, the duke ordered the siege. It is unknown how prolonged this siege was, but certainly, soon, due to the reluctance to fight from the rebels (knights and nobles probably feared that Przemysł II, after the capture of the castle, would spare nobody), the duke agreed to negotiate with them. Eventually, Przemysł II regained his castle of Kalisz, but he had to give the newly built castle in Ołobok to Henry Probus. There is no certainty that the betrayal of Sędziwój Zaremba was an isolated incident or part of a wider conspiracy from the Zaremba family. However, it can be assumed that the duke didn't believe in a familiar conspiracy because most of Sędziwój's relatives remained in their posts even after 1284. Another source supporting this is a document issued on 6 October (and thus during the period of siege) where the voivode of Poznań, Beniamin Zaremba, appears as a witness, and therefore had to remain in the inner circle of Przemysł II.

Przemysł II's change of attitude against Beniamin occurred in 1285. Due to little contemporary information, the cause is unknown. The Rocznik Traski only pointed out that the Duke of Greater Poland imprisoned both Sędziwój and Beniamin. At the end, apparently they were treated very gently, because Mestwin II of Pomerelia not only restored them to their previous post but also part of the property that had been confiscated from them. Moreover, Beniamin appeared again in the circle of Przemysł II around 1286.

=== Second marriage ===
In 1285, Przemysł II decided to remarry. The chosen bride was Richeza, daughter of the deposed King Valdemar of Sweden and granddaughter of King Eric IV of Denmark. Due to the lack of contacts between Greater Poland and Sweden, the negotiations were probably concluded through the mediation of the House of Ascania. The marriage by proxy took place in the Swedish city of Nyköping on 11 October 1285; in the ceremony, the Duke of Greater Poland was represented by the notary Tylon, who received from Przemysł II the village of Giecz in gratitude for his services. It is unknown when and where the formal wedding between Przemysł II and Rikissa took place, or who administered the sacrament of marriage: it could be either Bishop Jan of Poznań or Jakub Świnka, Archbishop of Gniezno.

=== Congresses of Łęczyca and Sulejów ===
The year 1285 brought to Przemysł II other successes: in January, Archbishop Jakub of Gniezno convened a meeting in the town of Łęczyca, where the excommunication of the main opponent of the Greater Poland ruler, Henry Probus, was confirmed; On 15 August, Przemysł II had another princely meeting, this time with Władysław I the Elbow-high and Ziemomysł of Inowrocław in the town of Sulejów, where the rebellion against Leszek II the Black and his deposition in favor of Konrad II of Masovia was probably discussed.

In May 1286, after the death of the Bishop of Poznań Jan Wyszkowic, his successor Jan Gerbicz was consecrated. The cooperation between the new bishop and Przemysł II was good, although some historians wonder why Bishop Gerbicz was later surnamed "traditor" (traitor).

=== Alliance between Greater Poland, Pomerelia and Western Pomerania ===
According to Jan Długosz, on 14 June 1287, some Greater Poland knights and (as was suggested by the chronicler), without the knowledge of his ruler, made a surprise attack on Ołobok, won the castle and returned the district to Greater Poland. Henry Probus decided not to respond with any armed conflict and accepted the loss; in unknown circumstances, around this time, Przemysł II also regained Wieluń (lost in 1281). It can be assumed that the attitude of the Duke of Wrocław was part of the concessions associated with his plans to obtain the throne of Kraków, and he wanted in this way to ensure the benevolent neutrality of the Duke of Greater Poland.

Some months later, on 23 November in the city of Słupsk, a meeting took place between Przemysł II, Mestwin II of Pomerelia and Bogislaw IV of Pomerania. There, they entered into an agreement of mutual cooperation and help against any opponent, especially the rulers of Brandenburg and Vitslav II, Prince of Rügen. The agreement also guaranteed the inheritance of Gdańsk by Bogislaw IV or his descendants in the case of the deaths of both Mestwin II and Przemysł II. In addition, this treaty contributed to a significant deterioration of the relations between Greater Poland and the House of Ascania, rulers of Brandenburg. The treaty was subsequently confirmed at a meeting in Nakło in August 1291.

=== Coalition and fatherhood ===
According to the theory of historian Oswald Balzer, around 1287 and by inspiration of Archbishop Jakub of Gniezno, a treaty of mutual inheritance was agreed on between Leszek II the Black, Henry Probus, Przemysł II and Henry III of Głogów. Balzer's theory gained immense popularity among historians. This view is refuted by Władysław Karasiewicz and Jan Baszkiewicz. However, it doesn't completely exclude the possibility that during this period an agreement could have been concluded between Przemysł II and Henryk IV Probus, evidenced by the fact that the Duke of Wrocław voluntarily returned the lands Ołobock and Wieluń to Przemysł II in his will.

On 14 May 1288, at the Congress of Rzepce, the alliance between Przemysł II and Mestwin II was further strengthened. In July, the Duke of Greater Poland visited the seriously ill Leszek II the Black in Kraków. The matters discussed in this visit are unknown.

The first and only child of Przemysł II was born in Poznań on 1 September 1288: a daughter, named Richeza, who later became queen of Bohemia and Poland as the wife of Wenceslaus II and after his death, of Rudolf I. The news of the birth of her daughter was also the latest information about Duchess Richeza. She certainly died after that date and before 13 April 1293, when Przemysł II entered into his third and last marriage. It seems that Przemysł II had deep and strong feelings for his second wife. This is evidenced not only by the fact that he give their daughter the name of the mother, but also by a document issued on 19 April 1293 where he ceded to the Bishopric of Poznań the village of Kobylniki as payment for a lamp lit eternally at his second wife's tomb.

=== Death of Leszek II the Black ===
On 30 September 1288 Leszek II the Black, Duke of Kraków, Sandomierz, and Sieradz, died childless . His death launched the outbreak of war in Lesser Poland. The Kraków knighthood was in favour of Bolesław II of Masovia, while the Sandomierz knighthood supported his brother Konrad II of Masovia; on the other hand, the middle-class citizenry favoured Henryk IV Probus, Duke of Wrocław.

At the beginning of 1289, Silesian troops marched under the command of the Duke of Wrocław and his allies Bolko I of Opole and Przemko of Ścinawa. They also counted on the support of Sulk the Bear (pl: Sułk z Niedźwiedzia), the castellan of Kraków, who had control over Wawel Castle. In response, a coalition against them was formed by Bolesław II of Płock, Casimir II of Łęczyca, and Władysław I the Elbow-high. Surprisingly, Przemysł II joined with them, thus ending all of his prior arrangements with the Duke of Wrocław.

The Wrocław-Opole-Ścinawa army realized that they had insufficient forces to resist the coalition of Greater Poland, Kuyavia, and Masovia, and decided to retreat to Silesia, where they would gather more troops. The retreating troops were quickly followed and a bloody battle took place in the town of Siewierz in Bytom on 26 February 1289, culminating in a full victory for Przemysł II and his allies. In this battle, Przemko of Ścinawa was killed and Bolko I of Opole was captured. After the battle Władysław I Łokietek took Kraków, and Przemysł II withdrew with his troops, making a separate truce with Henry Probus. However, later in 1289, Henry Probus took up arms against Kraków, removing Władysław I Łokietek to the government of Sandomierz. This event was considered temporary, because both Henry Probus and Władysław I Łokietek continued to use the title of Duke of Kraków and Sandomierz.

== Rise to kingship (1290–1295) ==
=== Acquisition of Kraków ===
Henry Probus, Duke of Wrocław and Kraków, died on 23 June 1290, probably poisoned. Because he died childless, in his will he bequeathed the Duchy of Wrocław to Henry III of Głogów, and Kraków – with the title of high duke and thus the overlordship over Poland – to Przemysł II. In addition, he returned Kłodzko to King Wenceslaus II of Bohemia and also gave the Duchy of Nysa–Otmuchów to the Bishopric of Wrocław as a perpetual fief with full sovereignty.

These latter dispositions were not surprising, since they were compatible with the most recent political stance of Henryk IV. However, the inheritance of Kraków and Sandomierz by Przemysł II, one of his closest male relatives, caused considerable surprise among historians. In historiography, there are several theories to explain the decision of the Duke of Wrocław. Recently, it has been assumed that Archbishop Jakub of Gniezno was behind this testament, because he was in Wrocław on 17 June 1290, a few days before the death of Henry Probus. In accordance with custom, Przemysł II had to pay some religious dispositions from Henry Probus: the transfer to Kraków Cathedral of 100 pieces of fine gold and devotion to the implementation of ornaments and liturgical books to the Tyniec monastery.

Przemysł II was probably informed very quickly about the death of the Duke of Wrocław. Due to the lack of documents, the first time he appeared with the title of Duke of Kraków was in a diploma issued on 25 July 1290. Przemysł II never used the title of Duke of Sandomierz in any of his documents, despite having full rights over this land under the will of Henryk IV Probus. This is because he did not have possession of it: Władysław I the Elbow-high, in fact, had conquered the land shortly before Henryk IV's death.

In Lesser Poland, Przemysł II adopted the crowned eagle – which was used previously by Henry Probus – as his emblem; his previous emblem, inherited from both his father and uncle, was a climbing lion.

It is unknown exactly when Przemysł II went to Kraków to assume control, as on 24 April 1290, he was still in Gniezno. Two months later, he issued a document in Kraków, where he initially supported and confirmed the power of the local elite (with castellan Żegota, chancellor Prokop, voivode Mikołaj, and treasurer Florian, among others), the clergy (including Paweł of Przemankowo, the Bishop of Kraków, who in another document issued on 12 September 1290 was given the right to collect tithes from the local income), and middle-class people.

=== Relations with Władysław I Łokietek ===
There is no certainty about the political relations between Przemysł II and Władysław I Łokietek, especially regarding who was the real ruler over the Duchy of Sandomierz. The fact that Przemysł II did not use the title "Duke of Sandomierz" supports the thesis that both competitors accepted Łokietek's authority and formal possession over that land, without precluding the possibility of minor clashes.

It is also noted that Przemysł II appointed officials only in Kraków and the surrounding areas (Wieliczka and Miechów). This probably indicated that the real power of the Duke of Greater Poland was confined to the city and nearby towns. The other territories were probably held by Władysław I Łokietek.

=== Resignation of Lesser Poland ===
Przemysł II left Kraków, capital of Lesser Poland, between 12 September and 23 October 1290. He never returned. Leaving Wawel castle, he took with him the royal crown and regalia that had been kept in the cathedral since the times of Bolesław II the Bold. At this point, he was already planning his own royal coronation.

Meanwhile, the pretensions of Wenceslaus II of Bohemia over Lesser Poland became more evident. His claims were supported by the donation made for his maternal aunt, Gryfina (also named Agrippina) of Halych (widow of Leszek II the Black) and the investiture given to him by King Rudolf I of Germany. Both documents had no significance under Polish law; however, his military power, wealth and the cultural proximity with the Kingdom of Bohemia made Wenceslaus II a widely accepted candidate in Lesser Poland. Przemysł II thus had two choices: a military confrontation (in which he had no chance due to the predominance of the Bohemian army), or political discussions.

On 14 October 1290, Archbishop Jakub Świnka inaugurated a provincial synod in Gniezno, assisted by Jan II Gerbicz, Bishop of Poznań; Tomasz Tomka, Bishop of Płock; Wiesław, Bishop of Kujawy; and Konrad, Bishop of Lebus (Lubusz). In addition to the Bishops, Przemysł II and Mestwin II of Pomerelia also assisted at the Synod. It was probably in this meeting that the Duke of Greater Poland decided to abandon his rights over Lesser Poland to Wenceslaus II in exchange for a monetary compensation.

It is not known exactly when the negotiations began between Przemysł II and Wenceslaus II. They certainly ended between 6 January (the last time when Przemysł II used the title of Duke of Kraków in a document) and 10 April 1291 (the first time when Wenceslaus II used this title in charters). In addition, it is also known that by mid-April, Bohemian troops led by Bishop Arnold of Bamberg were already at Wawel Castle.

=== Alliance with Henry III of Głogów ===
The loss of Lesser Poland did not prevent Przemysł II from actively participating in national politics. In the early 1290s (probably shortly after the death of Henry Probus), he entered into a close alliance with Henry III of Głogów. Details of this treaty are not preserved, and the only historic knowledge of this matter derives from a document issued by Władysław I Łokietek in Krzywiń on 10 March 1296, in which he emphasizes that Henry III had good rights over Greater Poland. Rejected the idea of kinship (who Władysław I Łokietek could claim due to his marriage to Jadwiga of Kalisz), it seems justified the view that in the early 1290s (certainly before January 1293, when Przemysł II became involved with Władysław I Łokietek) a treaty was signed in which the ruler of Greater Poland give rights of succession to the Duke of Głogów.

=== Congress of Kalisz ===
In January 1293, political talks occurred in Kalisz between Przemysł II, Władysław I Łokietek, and his brother Casimir II of Łęczyca. Details about the conversations are unknown; however, two documents survive in which the succession to the throne of Kraków (although only theoretical, because the Duchy was in the hands of Wenceslaus II) would be in the following order: first Przemysł II, then Władysław I Łokietek, and finally Casimir II of Łęczyca. In addition, they promised to help each other in the recovery of this land by any one of them and annually pay 300 pieces of fine silver to the Archbishop of Gniezno, with the obligation to duplicate the amount during the first two years. Conversations in Kalisz were certainly sensitive, and the initiator was without doubt Archbishop Jakub Świnka. The main motivation was probably to reinforce the anti-Bohemian coalition, in which the allies undertook to help each other. Przemysł II also named Władysław I Łokietek as his successor in Greater Poland in the case of his death without male heirs (although it is possible that, as in the case of Henry III of Głogów, they signed a treaty of mutual inheritance). In spite of the arrangements, there are no known actions by the coalition. Casimir II of Łęczyca died on 10 June 1294 in the Battle of Trojanów against Lithuania.

At the Congress of Kalisz, the marriage between Władysław I Łokietek and Jadwiga of Kalisz, Przemysł II's cousin and daughter of Bolesław the Pious, was probably arranged (and possibly performed).

=== Third marriage ===
Around the time of the Congress of Kalisz, Przemysł II decided to remarry, as his beloved wife Richeza was certainly dead by that time (probably the year before). The chosen bride was Margaret, daughter of Albert III, Margrave of Brandenburg-Salzwedel and Matilda of Denmark, daughter of King Christopher I. This marriage was concluded for political reasons and was expected to secure the succession of Przemysł II in Pomerelia. Due to the relatively close relationship between the Duke and his bride (they are both great-grandchildren of King Ottokar I of Bohemia), a papal dispensation was needed for the marriage. The wedding ceremony took place shortly before 13 April 1293; according to some historians, it was probably on this occasion that the betrothal between Przemysł II's daughter Ryksa and Otto of Brandenburg-Salzwedel, Margaret's brother, was also celebrated.

=== Acquisition of Pomerelia ===
In the spring of 1294, Mestwin II of Pomerelia paid a visit to Przemysł II. In turn, the Duke of Greater Poland was in Pomerelia on 15 June, where he approved documents with Mestwin II in Słupsk. By 30 June Przemysł II was again in Greater Poland.

The deteriorating health of Mestwin II forced Przemysł II to make another visit to Pomerelia in autumn. It is unknown if he was present when Mestwin II died on 25 December 1294 in Gdańsk; however, there is no doubt that Przemysł II took part in his funeral. The last Duke of Pomerelia from the Samborides was buried in the Cistercian monastery in Oliwa.

After inheriting Pomerelia, Przemysł II adopted the new title of "dux Polonie et Pomoranie". He remained in Gdańsk Pomerelia until the beginning of April, but by 10 April he was in Poznań.

== King of Poland (1295–1296) ==
=== Coronation ===
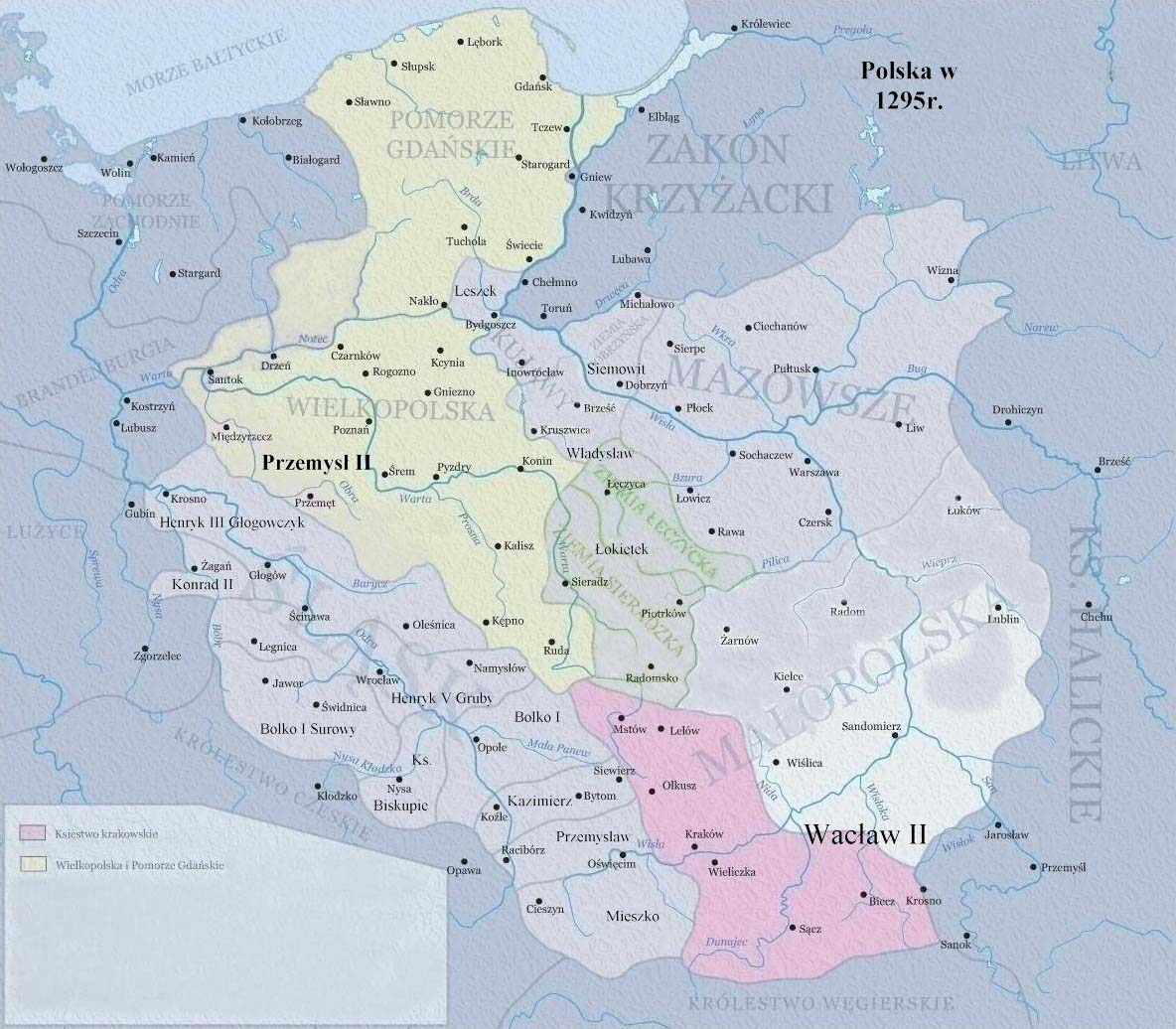
Poland at the time of Przemysł II (1295)

The unification of Greater Poland and Gdańsk Pomerania (Pomerelia) definitely made Przemysł II the strongest Piast ruler. Already by 1290, and with the help of Archbishop Jakub of Gniezno, Przemysł II began to prepare his coronation, earlier unsuccessfully pursued by Henry Probus, the preliminary step for the unification of Poland.

Due to the occupation of Lesser Poland by Wenceslaus II, the Duke of Greater Poland had to postpone his plans until 1294. Only with the death of Mestwin II – an event which considerably increased his power among the Piast rulers – Przemysł II, together with Archbishop Jakub, took the decisive decision for a coronation.

The coronation of Przemysł II and his wife Margaret took place at Gniezno Cathedral on Sunday, 26 June 1295, the day of Saints John and Paul. It is unknown why it took place as a simple coronation ceremony (ordinis cororandi) despite it being the first Polish coronation in 219 years. Besides Archbishop Jakub of Gniezno, the other main representatives of the church hierarchy who participated in the ceremony were: Bishops Konrad of Lubusz, Jan II of Poznań, Wisław of Włocławek and Gedko II of Płock. From the Polish episcopate, Bishops Johann III Romka of Wrocław and Jan Muskata of Kraków were possibly either present in person or sent their consents. Historians generally agree with the above list of Bishops who participated in the coronation. Certainly are some doubts about the presence of Bishop Konrad of Lubusz, who on 18 June was in Prague. However, as was noted by Kazimierz Tymieniecki, he could be able to make the travel to Gniezno for the coronation. There is no information about the secular witnesses of the coronation; certainly, many dignitaries from both Greater Poland and Pomerelia must have arrived. Similarly, no sources point to the presence of other Piast rulers in the ceremony.

The consent of Pope Boniface VIII wasn't necessary, because, due to the earlier coronations, Poland was already a Kingdom. Contemporary sources do not definitively confirm that Przemysł II and the Archbishop obtained the approval of the Holy See for the coronation. Only the Kronika oliwska and the Kronika zbrasławska stated that the coronation took place with such consent.

If there was an explicit approval, it could influence the later effort of Władysław the Elbow-high to obtain the Pope's permission for his own coronation; the coronation in 1320 took however place in very different circumstances, because Władysław had a competitor to the throne in the person of King John of Bohemia and the Papacy was then strongly influenced by the French court. In 1295, the Papacy was an independent entity and the Polish episcopate could more calmly await the expected protests from Wenceslaus II.

Regardless of whether Przemysł II had obtained the consent of the Pope or not, the legality of his coronation was not questioned by his contemporaries. Even the Czech Kronika zbrasławska did not deny the royal title of the Duke of Greater Poland, although it called him King of Kalisz. Finally, Wenceslaus II restricted his actions only to diplomatic protests to both Przemysł II (where he tried to persuade him to give up the crown) and the Papal Curia.

The coronation of Przemysł II gave rise to a dispute between historians about the extent of his kingdom. Stanisław Kutrzeba pointed out that Przemysł II, in fact, was crowned King of Greater Poland. This theory caused a lively discussion, which to this day doesn't give a clear answer about the monarchical status of Przemysł II. It could be expected, however, that Przemysł II wanted to revive through the coronation the old Kingdom of Poland, which also agrees with the inscription on the post-coronation seal Reddidit ipse pronis victricia signa Polonis, although in reality Przemysł II was politically limited to Greater Poland and Gdańsk Pomerania.

=== Royal government and assassination ===
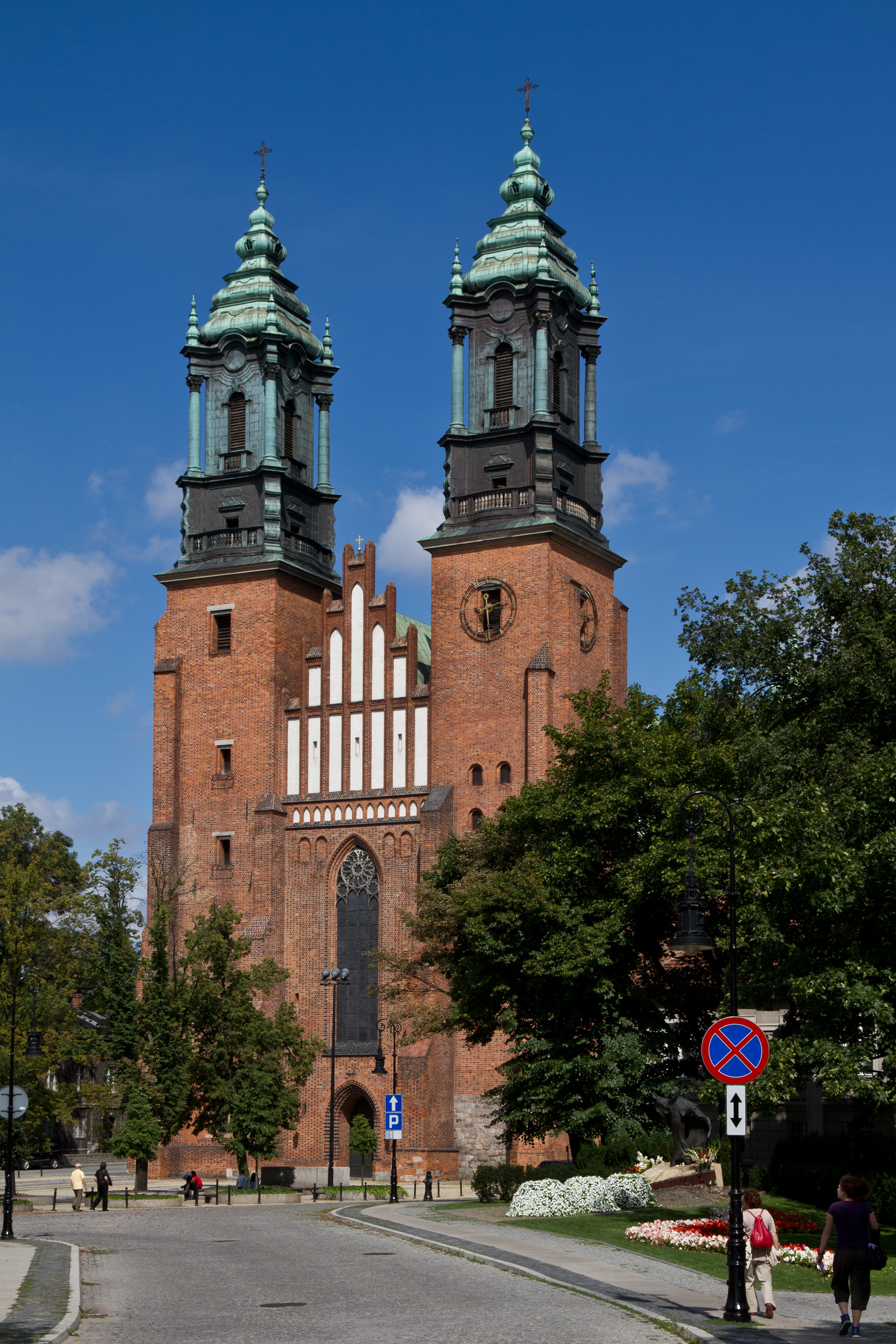
Archcathedral Basilica of St. Peter and St. Paul in Poznań, the burial place of Przemysł II

After the coronation, Przemysł II went to Pomerelia and came to Słupsk on 30 July, where he confirmed the privileges of the Cistercian monasteries in Oliwa and Żarnowiec. He then visited other major cities: Gdańsk, Tczew and Świecie. In August 1295, he returned to Greater Poland, but in October, he was again in Gdańsk. This demonstrates how important the Duchy of Pomerelia was for Przemysł II.

Taking into account the fact that these events took place in the 13th century, the sources that stated any details concerning Przemysł II's death are dubious; the Kronika wielkopolska failed to mention the events in Rogoźno.

Sources are divided about who are the perpetrators of the murder of the Polish King: the margraves of Brandenburg, some Polish families (the Nałęczs or Zarembas or the two families at the same time), and finally attempts to reconcile the two theories.

One of the first sources who must be taken into account was the almost contemporary Rocznik kapituły poznańskiej. The records shows that the margraves of Brandenburg, Otto V, another Otto (perhaps Otto IV), and John IV, nephew of Przemysł II (as son of his oldest sister Constance), sent an army who arrived in the dawn on 8 February 1296 to the town of Rogoźno, where the King spent the Carnival to kidnap him. However, because he showed strong resistance and was wounded, the men, unable to take him to Brandenburg, finally killed him. The motive for the crime was the hatred of the margraves toward the Polish King because of his coronation.

The murder of King Przemysł II by men of the margraves of Brandenburg was also supported by the Kronika oliwska (Chronicle of Oliva), which stipulates that after the coronation:

« Lived one year, was captured by the adjutant of Waldemar, Margrave of Brandenburg, and was murdered in revenge for his wife, the holy Lukarda, whom he suspected had killed before. »

With high probability, it is assumed that the first part of this information was translated from the Liber Mortuorum Monasterii Oliviensis by the author of the Kronika oliwska, Abbot Stanisław, and the message about the motives of the murder as a revenge for Ludgarda's death is the result of a latter addition of the Abbot. This passage established the main indication that Margrave Waldemar of Brandenburg was guilty of the crime; however, during the tragic events, he could not have participated because in 1296, he was less than 15 years old. Waldemar certainly gained notoriety only around 1308, after his failed attempt to seize Pomerania.

Another earlier source who wrote about the death of Przemysł II at the hands of Brandenburg was the Rocznik kołbacki of the Cistercian monastery in Kołbacz on Western Pomerania. The brief information is valuable primarily because it was the only one who named the direct perpetrator of the crime, a man named Jakub Kaszuba. The problem is that nothing certain about him was found in other sources, and besides, the name of Piotr, under what is known Przemysł II in the chronicle, raises big surprise. Most likely, this is a mistake of the author.

Finally, another source who accused the margraves of Brandenburg was the relatively later Chronicle of Henry of Hertford, which, although written during the mid-14th century, was reliable enough because it was from Germany (and therefore unsuspected of being partial). There, he stated that Przemysł II died during a war between Brandenburg and Greater Poland.

Another German chronicler, who unequivocally accused the House of Ascania, was Dietmar of Lübeck, which also pointed out that Przemysł II's wife Margaret took part in the conspiracy which killed him, due to her family relations. It is unknown whether the chronicler found this information from earlier sources or deduced it based on the simple relationship: because Margaret came from the family accused of the murder, she had to participate. Historian Małgorzata Duczmal heavily criticized accusing the Queen of the complicity in the crime, by pointing out that without her husband Margaret would lose all her political significance and endanger position of any of potential child had she been pregnant by Przemysł; moreover, Duczmal sees as improbable that the Dowager Queen would be entrusted with guardianship over her stepdaughter, Princess Ryksa, had in Poland be any doubt regarding the innocence of King's wife.

There are a number of sources, both Polish and foreign, who accused some Polish noble families of being perpetrators of the crime. Among the Polish sources who established this fact are: the Rocznik małopolski in the Szamotuły codec, the Rocznik Sędziwoja and the Kronika książąt polskich. The priority should be given to the nearest chronologically Rocznik Traski. Extremely important is also the testimony of Jan Łodzia, Bishop of Poznań during the Polish-Teutonic War of 1339, because it came from a person who participated in the political life of Greater Poland of those times.

The foreign sources who described the crime and pointed the culprits are: the Annales Toruniensis (date from the early 15th century), the Kronika zbrasławska (dated from the 14th century) and the Latopis hipacki, which was written in the first half of the 14th century. From the above-mentioned chronicles (from Lesser Poland, Bohemian and Kievan Rus' provenance), the main perpetrators in the King's death were Greater Poland, noble families. These families have been identified as either the Zarembas (according to the Rocznik małopolski) or the Nałęczs with the help of the Zarembas (according to the Latopis hipacki).

Finally, a third group of sources accused both the margraves of Brandenburg and the Polish noble families of the murder; for example, the Rocznik świętokrzyski nowy. Almost identical information was shown in the Katalog biskupów krakowskich, dated from the 15th century; however, there is an addition which also indicates that Wenceslaus II and a group of unnamed Polish princes are involved in the crime. It is unknown whether the author mentioned the involvement of Wenceslaus II as a simple deduction: because he had the greatest benefit for this crime, he must be the perpetrator. Finally, Jan Długosz indicated that the Zaremba and Nałęcz families, with the help of some "Saxons", are the perpetrators of the crime, a fact also reported by Marcin Bielski and Marcin Kromer.

8 February 1296 is widely recognized as the date of the crime. In fact, it appears in the Rocznik Traski, Rocznik małopolski, Rocznik Świętokrzyski nowyw, Kalendarz włocławski and the Liber mortuorum monasterii Oliviensis. The dates given by the Rocznik kapituły poznańskiej (6 February) and the Nekrolog lubiński (4 February), as well as the reports of Jan Długosz are considered erroneous.

As for the place of death, historians consider accurate the versions of the Rocznik małopolski ("prope oppidum Rogoszno") or the Rocznik Sędziwoja ("ante Rogoszno"), who stated that Przemysł II was killed near Rogoźno.

The body of 39-year-old Przemysł II was buried in the Archcathedral Basilica of St. Peter and St. Paul in Poznań, according to the Rocznik kapituły poznańskiej. The funeral was presided over by Bishop Jan. Crowds of nobles, clergy, knights and common citizens took part in the procession.

=== Reconstruction of the murder ===
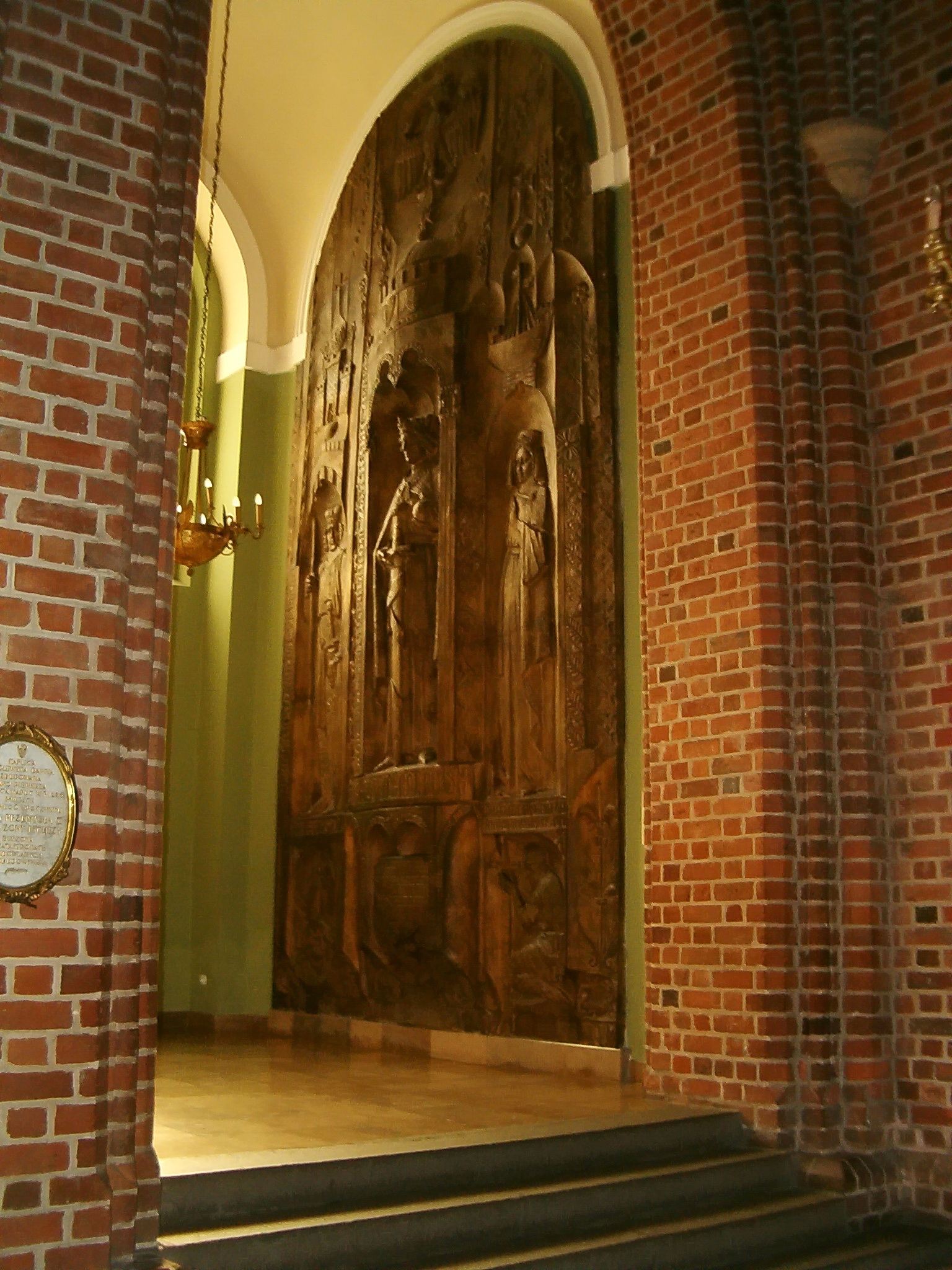
Epitaph of Przemysł II in the Royal Chapel of Poznań Archcathedral Basilica of St. Peter and St. Paul

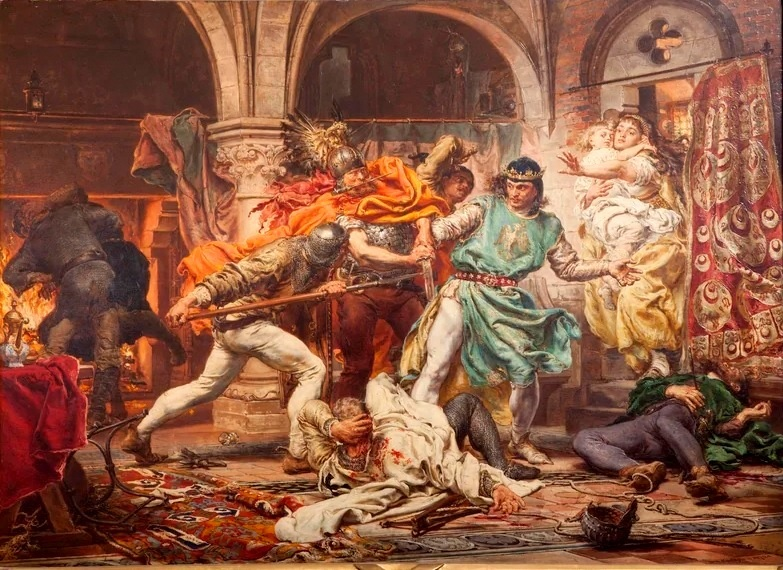
The Death of King Przemysł II by Jan Matejko, 1875

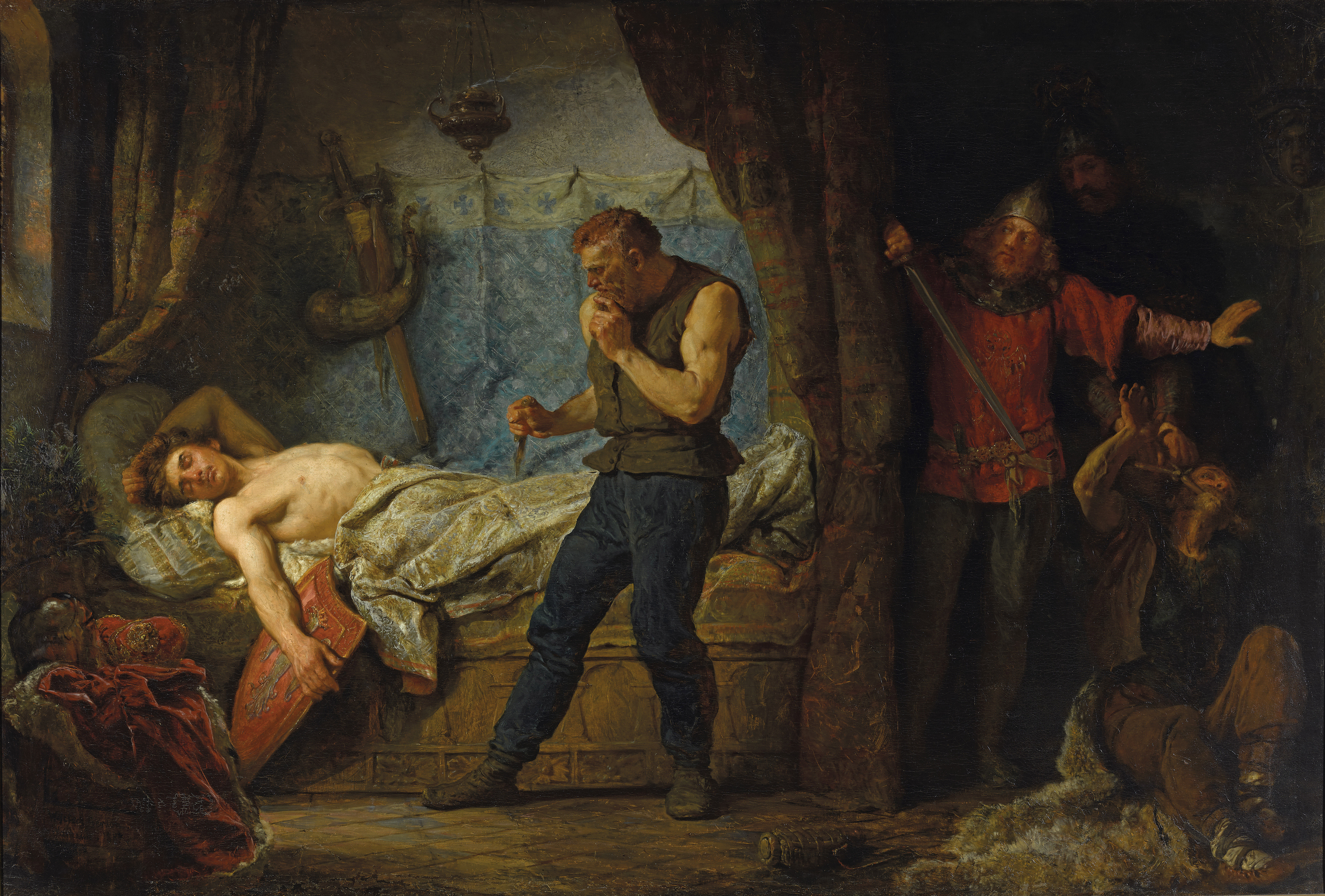
Assassination of King Przemysł II by Wojciech Gerson, 1881

The death of Przemysł II as a result of a failed kidnapping attempt was a matter of interest between historians. Circumstances of the death of the last of the Piast Greater Poland line were specifically studied by Karol Górski, Kazimierz Jasiński, Zygmunt Boras, Bronisław Nowacki and Edward Rymar. The importance in Polish history of the death of Przemysł II was also relevant in the works of Władysław Karasiewicz and Jan Pakulski, due to the role of the Nałęcz and Zaremba families.

In 1295, the King spent Christmas in Gniezno, where he met with Władysław I Łokietek. The reason for this meeting is unknown. Probably the possibility of the recovery of Lesser Poland was discussed, as was the defeat of Brandenburg. In any case, these conversations could be shown as a threat by the Brandenburg Margraves, who are still anxiously watching the inheritance of Pomerelia by Przemysł II after Mestwin II's death and his royal coronation. But the main concern of the House of Ascania was obvious to all: the union of the Kingdom of Poland, and that sooner or later, Przemysł II would claim the lands seized by the Margraves in Greater Poland.

After 25 January 1296, the King left his capital, and surely by 3 February he was in Pyzdry. For the last days of the Carnival (between 4–7 February), Przemysł II decided to spend these festivities in the town of Rogoźno.

It is unknown if the King was accompanied by his wife Margaret or by his daughter Ryksa, but it appears to be likely.

Leaving Pyzdry, the King certainly didn't think that about only 30 km away, in the Brandenburg town of Brzezina are staying the two brothers Margraves Otto IV and Conrad, and the sons of the latter: Otto VII, John IV and probably also the youngest, Waldemar. They were carefully informed by traitors from Przemysł II's inner circle about the King's itinerary for the next few days.

In the meantime, Przemysł II participated in the traditional tournaments and religious services of the Carnival. The security guard of the King became weaker, especially since probably 8 February. On that day began the forty days of Lent, and before heading out again, the entourage wanted to rest.

The plan to kidnap the King by the Margraves of Brandenburg was widely detailed by the Roczniki małopolski. They probably wanted to obtain from Przemysł II the resignation of Pomerelia and with this, his plans for the unification of the Polish Kingdom. The contingent was probably consisted of dozens of people, because made the kidnapping in hostile territory required adequate preparation. Direct command of the army was entrusted, according to the Rocznik kołbacki, to a certain Jakub, who was identified by Edward Rymar as Jakub Guntersberg (Jakub Kaszuba).

Although the personal participation of the Margraves in the kidnapping was stated in the Rocznik kapituły poznańskie and the chronicle of Jan Długosz, this fact seems unlikely, because they would not risk their lives with no certainty of success. In any case, an army of a few dozen men set off in the evening on 7 February (probably after sunset), by the shortest route through Noteć to the place where Przemysł II stayed. As was stated by Karol Górski, the sunset of 7 February (or properly 30 January, if we taken into account the subsequent calendar reform) occurred at 16:48, and the sunrise had come about 7:38, which gave fourteen hours to the army to quietly reach to their target.

The attack took place early in the morning of 8 February, on Ash Wednesday, when the bodyguards of the King were in a deep sleep. Despite this, they were able to organize a defense under the personal guidance of the King, but the attackers were too numerous to overcome. The primary objective of Jakub Kaszuba's people was the capture of Przemysł II; they succeeded only after the King, covered with numerous wounds, fell to the ground. The Brandenburg army seriously wounded his horse to flee towards the border with Silesia (probably with the intention to confuse the Polish army). Soon, the kidnappers realised that they weren't able to bring alive the King to life, and the prisoner only delays their escape. Then decided the murder of the King, a deed personally made by Kaszuba. A late tradition says that the murder took place probably in the village of Sierniki, about 6.5 km east from Rogoźno. The King's body was abandoned on the road, where it was found by the knights involved in the persecution. The place where the crime was committed and his body was found (pl: porąbania) was traditionally named Porąblic. The assassins were never caught.

Thus, there is much convincing evidence for the participation of the Margraves of Brandenburg in the murder. According to Kazimierz Jasiński, that efficient action wasn't possible without the participation of people who were close to Przemysł II. Historians are divided about which of two noble families, Nałęcz or Zaremba, participated in this event. The Zarembas are more suspect based on the writings of the Rocznik małopolski: the rebellion of 1284, certainly caused a deterioration in their relations with the King. About the Nałęcz family, there is no accusation against them in the Rocznik świętokrzyskiego nowy or in the chronicle of Długosz; in fact, modern historiography writes about the friendly relationship of Przemysł II with the Grzymała and Łodzia families, and also with the Nałęcz.

== Aftermath ==
Although the death of Przemysł II, the last male member of the Piast Greater Poland line, certainly surprised his neighbors (including Brandenburg, whose purpose was to kidnap the king, not his murder), it caused the rapid intervention of all the forces who wanted to seize power in his domains. Probably even in February, and by March, Greater Poland was in the middle of a confrontation between Władysław I Łokietek (supported by Bolesław II of Masovia) and Henry III of Głogów (with the help of Bolko I of Opole).

The war, if it really took place, didn't last long, because on 10 March 1296 in Krzywiń an armistice was signed. Under the agreement, the Elbow-high accepted the rights of the Duke of Głogów over Greater Poland, following the terms of his previous treaty with Przemysł II. In addition, the Duke of Kujawy adopted Henry III's eldest son Henry IV the Faithful as his heir, while ensuring that at the moment of his majority, Władysław Łokietek would provide him with the Duchy of Poznań.

It's not known why Władysław Łokietek considered that Henry III of Głogów had better rights to Greater Poland than him. Generally, historians believe that it was probably because of the constant threat of Brandenburg, who seized the land of Noteć and the castles in Wieleń, Czarnków, Ujście, Santok and Drezdenko.

The second reason for Władysław Łokietek's quick agreement with Henry III of Głogów was the intervention in Gdańsk of his nephew Leszek of Inowrocław, who made claims to this part of the lands of Przemysł II. Finally, thanks to the fast intervention of Władysław Łokietek in Pomerelia, Leszek retreated to his paternal domains in Inowrocław after receiving as compensation the town of Wyszogród.

With the death of Przemysł II came the partition of his domains, and only thanks to the instant reaction of Władysław Łokietek, the losses against of Brandenburg, Głogów and Kujawy were relatively small.

Przemysł's only daughter, Princess Ryksa, was placed into the care of her stepmother Queen Margaret of Brandenburg, and was raised by her stepfamily in Brandenburg until 1300, when she moved to Bohemia after being engaged to King Wenceslaus II, whom she ultimately married in 1303. The couple eventually ascended to the Polish throne, but Wenceslaus II died shortly after, in 1305. Ryksa remarried to Rudolf I of Bohemia, who tried to claim kingship over Poland by virtue of being her husband; he died however, after just one year of marriage in 1307, leaving the Queen a widow once again. While not marrying any of them, she nevertheless was supporting claims of the next Bohemian rulers to the Polish throne. Queen's only surviving child was Agnes, who died without issue around 1336, thus ending Przemysł's progeny.

== Seals and coinage ==
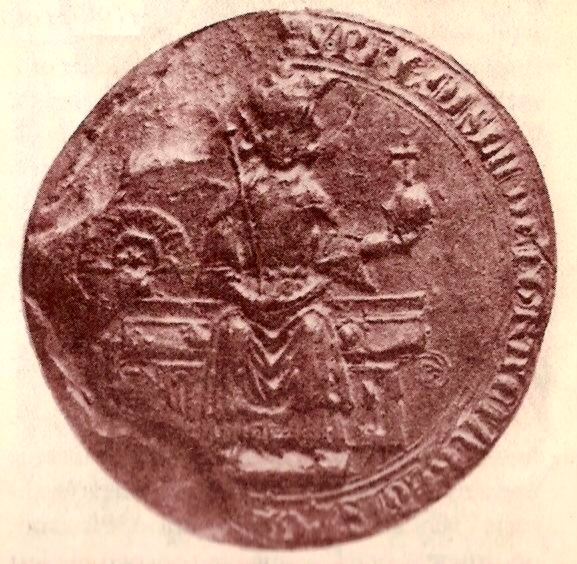
Przemysł II's seal, naming him Premisl II Dei Gracia Regis Poloniae Domini Pomeraniae

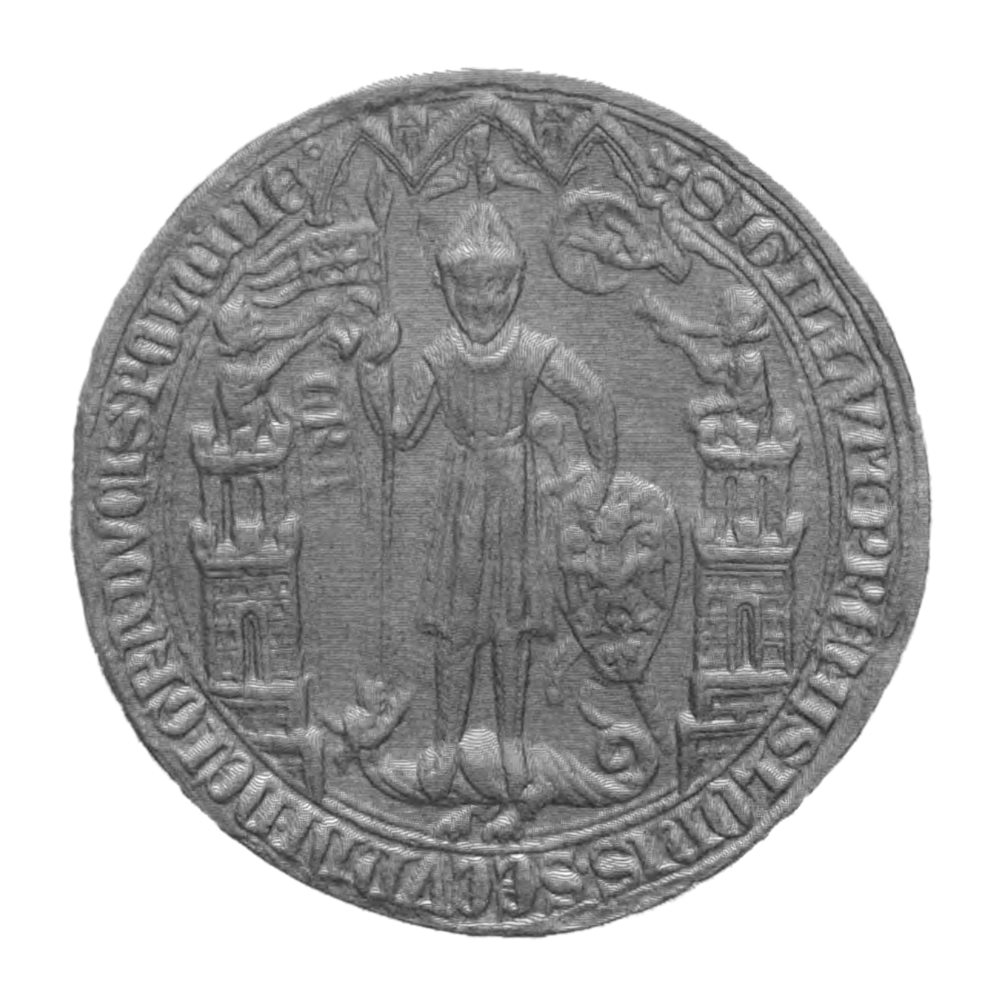
A seal depicting Przemysł II in armour

During his reign, Przemysł II had only five seals:

- The first seal was inherited from his father and manifests a standing figure with a pennant in his right hand and a shield in his left. On the dial bears a climbing lion. On both sides of the form appear standing towers, with trumpeters blowing horns. The character of the prince's hand is shown as a blessing of God. Around an inscription: "Sig. Premislonis Dei Gra(cia) Ducis Polonie". This seal was, in consequence, used conclusively between the years 1267 and 1284;
- The second seal and coat of arms shows a climbing lion, and around it is shown the inscription: "S. Premizlonis Dei Gra(cia) Ducis Polonie". Przemysł II used this form of seal from 1267 to 1289;
- The third seal, depicting the same elements of the first (the figure is, however, larger and on the dial instead of a lion appears an eagle without a crown), bears the inscription: "Sig Premislonis Secundi Dei Gra(cia) Ducis Polonie". It's known only from a single document issued on 12 September 1290;
- The fourth seal, used during the years 1290–1295, is larger than the previous ones and shows the prince standing with a pointed cap on his head. In his left hand he holds a shield with a crowned eagle, the right pennant with crowned eagle, which runs ribbon with the inscription "Et Cra". At the bottom of the seal bears trampled by the ruler a dragon. In the rim bears the same inscription as on the third seal;
- The fifth seal was used by Przemysł II after his coronation, during 1295–1296. The new stamp is majestic and shows on the obverse the king sitting on a throne in a long robe and with long hair, wearing a crown on his head, holding in his left hand an apple with a cross in the right scepter. On the right hand of the king, the throne bears a helmet with feathers. An inscription around the seal is shown: "S. Premislii Dei Gracia. Regis. Polonie (et Ducis) Pomoranie". It also includes the inscription, according to K. Górski (in "Rocznik Gdański", XII, 1938, p. 29): "S(igillum) Premislii Dei Gracia Regis Polonorum et Ducis Pomora(nie)". The inscription on the seal raises some doubt due to the damage to the preserved copy of the seal, according to the reconstruction of Stanisław Krzyżanowski reads: "Reddidit Ips(e Deus) Victricia Signa. Polonis".

Historians do not agree on why Przemysł II replaced the seal used by his father and uncle with a lion and an eagle. It is believed that either he wanted to emphasize his precedence from the Piast dynasty (the eagle in the coat of arms was also used by Władysław III Spindleshanks and Władysław Odonic), or with the symbol wanted to emphasize his rights inherited from Henry Probus.

There is no known coin that can certainly be attributed to Przemysł II. However, due to the existence of mints, confirmed by sources, it is possible that many coin portrayals were misinterpreted by experts. Some historians attributed to the Greater Poland ruler two types of coins: the Bracteate, preserved in seven copies, showing a portrait in profile with a crown, holding in his hands a sword, and a coin preserved in a single copy, which differs from the first model inscription "REX" and the crowning headgear (on the second copy appears topped with a cross). Both coins resemble the Denarius from times of Bolesław II the Generous.

== Economic policy ==
Due to the nature of the extant sources from the times of Przemysł II (documents and narrative texts recording mainly – if not exclusively – political events), it is difficult to indicate what the major plans of action of the King in the economic sphere were. The most important ally for Przemysł II was the Roman Catholic Church, and for obvious reasons (copyists and translators, in the vast majority, are from the clergy) most documents who detailed their collaboration have been preserved to this day.

One of the most important political allies of Przemysł II was Jakub Świnka, Archbishop of Gniezno. Already on 8 January 1284, he managed to obtain the village of Polanów. Much more important, the grace of the King to Archbishop Jakub was received on 1 August when he obtained the right to mint his own coins in Żnin and the castellany of Ląd. Moreover, under these privileges of coin minting, the Archbishop was to be treated as equal with the Greater Poland ruler. Two years later, on 20 June 1286, there was a failed attempt to get the same privilege of the Archbishop to Duke Bolesław II of Masovia in Łowicz; this became the basis for the economic independence of Jakub and the economic power of Greater Poland. Also, the Bishop of Poznań received similar grants from Przemysł II for example, in 1288 in the city of Śródka, in 1289, an exemption from mercantile taxes to the episcopal city of Buk, and finally, in 1290, was approved the grant of German law for Słupca. For political reasons, there is no similar support to other bishops – with one exception – in 1287, Przemysł II released Bishop Konrad of Lubusz from the current Polish law and authorized the implementation of the German law in his diocese.

The Greater Poland ruler also tried to support monastic orders. The surviving sources showed that among the most favored were the Cistercians and especially his monasteries in Ląd (who received grants in the years 1280, 1289, 1291 and 1293), Łekno (1280, 1283, 1288), and Gościkowo (1276, 1277, 1290). Those enjoying a little less support included the Benedictines (especially the monastery of Lubin, who received privileges in the years 1277, 1294, 1296), and Dominicans (his friary in Poznań received in 1277 the right to fishing on the Warta, and the monastery of Wronki monetary grants). Przemysł II also granted small privileges to military orders: the Templars, the Hospitallers, and the Canons of the Holy Sepulchre.

Przemysł II also favoured the middle class, and happily, to this day, many documents regarding this have survived. In 1280, the capital Poznań bought from the government lands and utilities, and received income from stalls and shambles. Three years later, the merchants were freed from paying some taxes in Greater Poland. The second main city in Greater Poland, Kalisz, received in 1282 the confirmation of some rights previously granted by Bolesław the Pious. In 1283, the Duke extended the town privileges in all the cities of Greater Poland following the model of Kalisz (Privilege of Kalisz). In 1287, another city was granted privileges for the Jewish community to establish a local cemetery in the village of Czaszki). In 1289, a city obtained consent for the construction of five pharmacies and the authorization of a sixth). In 1291, cloth sellers received from the Duke the revenue from customs duties, and the city received 12 pieces of land for the purpose of grazing). In 1292, an exemption from customs duties levied in Ołobok was granted.) In 1294, noble privileges, based on former and existing German laws, were granted in the city of Kalisz).

In addition to the privileges granted to Poznań and Kalisz, other individual privileges given to Pyzdry in 1283 (exemption from paying customs duties merchants in Greater Poland), to Rogoźno in 1280 (implementation of the German law) and Elbląg in 1294 (confirmation of privileges given by Mestwin II).

== Bibliography ==
- Henryk Andrulewicz, Geneza orła białego jako herbu Królestwa Polskiego w roku 1295, [in:] "Studia Źródłoznawcze", vol. XIII, 1968, pp. 1–26.
- Oswald Balzer, Genealogia Piastów, Kraków 1895.
- Oswald Balzer, Królestwo Polskie 1295–1370, vol. I–III, Lwów 1919–1920.
- Antoni Barciak, Czechy a ziemie południowej Polski w XIII wieku oraz na początku XIV wieku. Polityczno-ideologiczne problemy ekspansji czeskiej na ziemie południowej Polski, Katowice 1992.
- Antoni Barciak, Czeskie echa koronacji Przemysła II, [in:] Przemysł II. Odnowienie Królestwa Polskiego, ed. Jadwiga Krzyżaniakowej, Poznań 1997, pp. 225–232.
- Jan Baszkiewicz, Powstanie zjednoczonego państwa polskiego na przełomie XIII i XIV wieku, Warsaw 1954.
- Jan Baszkiewicz, Rola Piastów w procesie zjednoczenia państwowego Polski, [in:] Piastowie w dziejach Polski. Zbiór artykułów z okazji trzechsetnej rocznicy wygaśnięcia dynastii Piastów, ed. Roman Hecka, Wrocław 1975, pp. 49–68.
- Zofia Białłowicz-Krygierowa, Posągi memoratywne Przemysła II i Ryksy w dawnej Kaplicy Królewskiej katedry w Poznaniu, [in:] Przemysł II. Odnowienie Królestwa Polskiego, ed. J. Krzyżaniakowej, Poznań 1997, pp. 307–327.
- Maria Bielińska, Kancelarie i dokumenty wielkopolskie XIII wieku, Wrocław 1967.
- Maria Bielińska, Antoni Gąsiorowski, Jerzy Łojko, Urzędnicy wielkopolscy XII–XV wieku. Spisy, Wrocław 1985.
- Janusz Bieniak, Postanowienia układu kępińskiego (15 lutego 1282), [in:] "Przegląd Historyczny", vol. LXXXII, 1991, pp. 209–232.
- Janusz Bieniak, Zjednoczenie państwa polskiego, [in:] Polska dzielnicowa i zjednoczona. Państwo. Społeczeństwo. Kultura, ed. A. Gieysztora, Warsaw 1972, pp. 202–278.
- Janusz Bieniak, Znaczenie polityczne koronacji Przemysła II, [in:] Orzeł Biały. Herb państwa polskiego, ed. S. Kuczyńskiego, Warsaw 1996, pp. 35–52.
- Zbigniew Dalewski, Ceremonia koronacji Przemysła II, [in:] Przemysł II. Odnowienie Królestwa Polskiego, ed. J. Krzyżaniakowej, Poznań 1997, pp. 199–212.
- Edmund Długopolski, Władysław Łokietek na tle swoich czasów, Wrocław 1951.
- Włodzimierz Dworzaczek, Genealogia, Warsaw 1959.
- Sławomir Gawlas, Polityka wewnętrzna Przemysła II a mechanizmy społecznych dążeń i konfliktów w Wielkopolsce jego czasów, [in:] Przemysł II. Odnowienie Królestwa Polskiego, ed. J. Krzyżaniakowej, Poznań 1997, pp. 65–80.
- Karol Górski, Śmierć Przemysła II, [in:] "Roczniki Historyczne", V, 1929, pp. 170–200.
- Roman Grodecki, Polska piastowska, Warsaw 1969.
- Roman Gumowski, Monety królewskie Przemysława II, [in:] "Wiadomości Numizmatyczne", II, 1958, t. 3, pp. 11–15.
- Marian Haisig, Herby dynastyczne Piastów i początki godła państwowego Polski, [in:] Piastowie w dziejach Polski. Zbiór artykułów z okazji trzechsetnej rocznicy wygaśnięcia dynastii Piastów, ed. R. Heck, Wrocław 1975, pp. 149–166.
- Wojciech Iwańczak, Elżbieta Ryksa – królowa, kobieta, mecenas sztuki, [in:] Nasi Piastowie, "Kronika miasta Poznania", 1995, nr 2, pp. 153–164.
- Kazimierz Jasiński, Gdańsk w okresie samodzielności politycznej Pomorza Gdańskiego, [in:] Historia Gdańska, vol. I. ed. E. Cieślaka, Gdańsk 1978, pp. 271–297.
- Kazimierz Jasiński, Genealogia Piastów wielkopolskich. Potomstwo Władysława Odonica, [in:] Nasi Piastowie, "Kronika miasta Poznania", 1995, nr 2, pp. 34–66.
- Kazimierz Jasiński, Ludgarda (ok. 1260–1283), pierwsza żona Przemysła II, księcia wielkopolskiego, od r. 1295 króla polskiego, Polski Słownik Biograficzny, vol. XVIII, Wrocław 1973, pp. 87–88.
- Kazimierz Jasiński, Przemysł II (1257–1296), książę wielkopolski, krakowski, pomorski, król polski, [in:] Polski Słownik Biograficzny, vol. XXVIII, Wrocław 1984–1985, pp. 730–733.
- Kazimierz Jasiński, Rola polityczna możnowładztwa wielkopolskiego w latach 1284–1314, [in:] "Roczniki Historyczne", vol. XXIX, 1963, pp. 215–250.
- Kazimierz Jasiński, Ryksa Elżbieta – Boemie et Polonie bis regina, [in:] Przemysł II. Odnowienie Królestwa Polskiego, ed. J. Krzyżaniakowej, Poznań 1997, pp. 269–280
- Kazimierz Jasiński, Stosunki Przemysła II z mieszczaństwem, [w:] Czas, przestrzeń, praca w dawnych miastach. Studia ofiarowane Henrykowi Samsonowiczowi w sześćdziesiątą rocznicę urodzin, Warsaw 1991, pp. 319–328.
- Kazimierz Jasiński, Szwedzkie małżeństwo księcia wielkopolskiego Przemysła II (Ryksa żona Przemysła) [in:] Monastycyzm, Słowiańszczyzna i państwo polskie. Warsztat badawczy historyka, ed. K. Bobowskiego, Wrocław 1994, pp. 69–80.
- Kazimierz Jasiński, Tragedia Rogozińska 1296 r. na tle rywalizacji wielkopolsko-brandenburskiej o Pomorze Gdańskie, [in:] "Zapiski Historyczne", vol. XXVI, 1961, t. 4, pp. 65–104.
- Kazimierz Jasiński, Z problematyki zjednoczenia państwa polskiego na przełomie XIII i XIV wieku, [in:] "Zapiski Towarzystwa Naukowego w Toruniu", vol. XXI, Toruń 1955, pp. 198–241.
- Kazimierz Jasiński, Zapis Pomorza Gdańskiego przez Mszczuja w 1282 r., [in:] "Przegląd Zachodni", VIII, 1952, nr 5–6, pp. 176–189.
- Tomasz Jurek, Dziedzic Królestwa Polskiego książę głogowski Henryk (1274–1309), Poznań 1993.
- Tomasz Jurek, Przygotowania do koronacji Przemysła II, [in:] Przemysł II. Odnowienie Królestwa Polskiego, ed. J. Krzyżaniakowej, Poznań 1997, pp. 167–180.
- Tomasz Jurek, Testament Henryka Probusa. Autentyk czy falsyfikat?, [in:] "Studia Źródłoznawcze", vol. XXXV, 1994, pp. 79–99.
- Władysław Karasiewicz, Biskup poznański Jan Zaremba 1297–1316, [in:] "Sprawozdania Poznańskiego Towarzystwa Przyjaciół Nauk", nr 49 first and second quarter 1957, pp. 62–64.
- Władysław Karasiewicz, Działalność polityczna Andrzeja Zaremby w okresie jednoczenia państwa polskiego na przełomie XIII/XIV wieku, Poznań 1961.
- Władysław Karasiewicz, Jakób II Świnka arcybiskup gnieźnieński 1283–1314, Poznań 1948.
- Stanisław Kętrzyński, O dwóch pieczęciach Przemysła II z roku 1290, [in:] "Miesięcznik heraldyczny", II, 1932, pp. 21–30.
- Stanisław Kętrzyński, O królestwie wielkopolskim, [in:] "Przegląd Historyczny", vol. VIII, 1909, pp. 129–153.
- Jadwiga Krzyżaniakowa, Rola kulturalna Piastów w Wielkopolsce, [in:] Piastowie w dziejach Polski. Zbiór artykułów z okazji trzechsetnej rocznicy wygaśnięcia dynastii Piastów, ed. R. Heck, Wrocław 1975, pp. 167–195.
- Stanisław Krzyżanowski, Dyplomy i kancelaryja Przemysława II. Studium z dyplomatyki polskiej XIII wieku, [in:] "Pamiętnik Akademii Umiejętności, Wydział Filologiczny i Historyczno-Filozoficzny", vol. VIII 1890, pp. 122–192.
- Stanisław Krzyżanowski, Regnum Poloniae, vol. I, II, [in:] "Sprawozdania Akademii Umiejętności, Wydział Historyczno-Filozoficzny", 1905, nr 5, pp. 14–16, 1913, nr 9, pp. 20–24.
- Brygida Kürbis, O Ludgardzie, pierwszej żonie Przemysła II, raz jeszcze, [in:] Przemysł II. Odnowienie Królestwa Polskiego, ed. J. Krzyżaniakowej, Poznań 1997, pp. 257–267.
- Brygida Kürbis, Dziejopisarstwo wielkopolskie w XIII i XIV w., Warsaw 1959.
- Gerard Labuda, Mściwoj II, Polski Słownik Biograficzny, vol. XXII, Wrocław 1977, pp. 229–231.
- Gerard Labuda, O godności króla i instytucji królestwa, [in:] Przemysł II. Odnowienie Królestwa Polskiego, ed. J. Krzyżaniakowej, Poznań 1997, pp. 27–56.
- Gerard Labuda, Wielkopolska na drogach rozwoju politycznego ku koronacji Przemysła II, [in:] Nasi Paistowie, "Kroniki Miasta Poznania", 1995, t. 2, pp. 10–33.
- Henryk Łowmiański, Początki Polski, vol. VI, Warsaw 1985.
- Norbert Mika, Imię Przemysł w wielkopolskiej linii Piastów. Niektóre aspekty stosunków książąt wielkopolskich z Czechami do połowy XIII wieku, [in:] Przemysł II. Odnowienie Królestwa Polskiego, ed. J. Krzyżaniakowej, Poznań 1997, pp. 247–255.
- Sławomir Musiał, Bitwa pod Siewierzem i udział w niej Wielkopolan, [in:] Przemysł II. Odnowienie Królestwa Polskiego, ed. J. Krzyżaniakowej, Poznań 1997, pp. 161–166.
- Bronisław Nowacki, Czeskie roszczenia do korony w Polsce w latach 1290–1335, Poznań 1987.
- Bronisław Nowacki, Przemysł II, książę wielkopolski, król Polski 1257–1295, Poznań 1995.
- Bronisław Nowacki, Przemysł II 1257–1296. Odnowiciel korony polskiej, Poznań 1997.
- Bronisław Nowacki, Zabiegi o zjednoczenie państwa i koronację królewską w latach 1284 i 1285 na tle rywalizacji Przemysła II z Henrykiem IV Prawym, [in:] Przemysł II. Odnowienie Królestwa Polskiego, ed. J. Krzyżaniakowej, Poznań 1997, pp. 153–160.
- Bronisław Nowacki, Związki małżeńskie książąt jednoczycieli państwa polskiego w drugiej połowie XIII wieku na tle ich polityki zjednoczeniowej. Rola polityczna margrabiów brandenburskich z młodszej linii askańskiej, [in:] Docento discimus. Studia historyczne poświęcone Profesorowi Zbigniewowi Wielgoszowi w siedemdziesiątą rocznicę urodzin, ed. K. Kaczmarka and J. Nikodema, Poznań 2000, pp. 161–171.
- Tomasz Nowakowski, Krakowska kapituła katedralna wobec panowania Przemyślidów w Małopolsce w latach 1292–1306, [in:] "Przegląd Historyczny", vol. LXXXII, 1991, t. 1, pp. 1–20.
- Tomasz Nowakowski, Małopolska elita władzy wobec rywalizacji o tron krakowski w latach 1288–1306, Bydgoszcz 1992.
- Tomasz Nowakowski, Stosunki między Przemysłem II a Władysławem Łokietkiem w okresie walk o Kraków po śmierci Leszka Czarnego (1288–1291), [in:] "Roczniki historyczne", vol. LIV, 1988, pp. 143–161.
- Krzysztof Ożóg, Przemysł II, [in:] Piastowie. Leksykon biograficzny, Kraków 1999, pp. 154–161.
- Jan Pakulski, Itinerarium książęco-królewskie Przemysła II, [in:] "Studia Źródłoznawcze", vol. XXXIX, 2001, pp. 69–94.
- Jan Pakulski, Nałęcze w Wielkopolsce w średniowieczu. Genealogia, uposażenie i rola polityczna w XII–XIV w., Warsaw 1982.
- Jan Pakulski, Rola polityczna Beniamina Zaremby w drugiej połowie XIII wieku, [in:] "Zeszyty Naukowe Uniwersytetu Mikołaja Kopernika w Toruniu. Nauki Humanistyczno-Społeczne", vol. XXXV, Historia V, 1969, pp. 21–32.
- Jan Pakulski, Ród Zarembów w Wielkopolsce w XIII i początkach XIV wieku. Prace Komisji Historii XI, Bydgoskie Towarzystwo Naukowe, serie C, nr 16, 1975, pp. 103–137.
- Jan Pakulski, Stosunki Przemysła II z duchowieństwem metropolii gnieźnieńskiej, [in:] Przemysł II. Odnowienie Królestwa Polskiego, ed. J. Krzyżaniakowej, Poznań 1997, pp. 81–100.
- Zenon Piech, O pieczęciach, herbach i monetach Przemysła II (Uwagi dyskusyjne), [in:] Przemysł II. Odnowienie Królestwa Polskiego, ed. J. Krzyżaniakowej, Poznań 1997, pp. 181–198.
- Zenon Piech, Studia nad symboliką zjednoczeniową pieczęci książąt piastowskich w drugiej połowie XIII wieku i początkach XIV wieku, "Zeszyty Naukowe Uniwersytetu Jagiellońskiego. Prace historyczne", vol. LXXXIV, 1987, pp. 37–60.
- Tomasz Pietras, Krwawy Wilk z pastorałem. Biskup krakowski Jan zwany Muskatą, Warsaw 2001.
- Poczet królów i książąt polskich, ed. VII, Warsaw 1996.
- Barbara Popielas-Szultka, Przemysł II a Pomorze Zachodnie (stosunki polityczne), [in:] Przemysł II. Odnowienie Królestwa Polskiego, ed. J. Krzyżaniakowej, Poznań 1997, pp. 145–152.
- Jan Powierski, Krzyżacka polityka Przemysła II w pierwszym okresie aktywności politycznej, [in:] Przemysł II. Odnowienie Królestwa Polskiego, ed. J. Krzyżaniakowej, Poznań 1997, pp. 101–122.
- Edward Rymar, Próba identyfikacji Jakuba Kaszuby, zabójcy króla Przemysła II, w powiązaniu z ekspansją brandenburską na północne obszary Wielkopolski, [in:] Niemcy – Polska w średniowieczu. Materiały z konferencji naukowej zorganizowanej przez Instytut Historii UAM w dniach 14–16 XI 1983 r., ed. J. Strzelczyka, Poznań 1986, pp. 203–224.
- Edward Rymar, Przynależność polityczna wielkopolskich ziem zanoteckich między dolną Drawą i dolną Gwdą, oraz Wielenia, Czarnkowa i Ujścia w latach 1296–1368, [in:] "Roczniki Historyczne", vol. L, 1984, pp. 39–84.
- Edward Rymar, Stosunki Przemysła II z margrabiami brandenburskimi ze starszej linii askańskiej w latach 1279–1296, [in:] Przemysł II. Odnowienie Królestwa Polskiego, ed. J. Krzyżaniakowej, Poznań 1997, pp. 123–144.
- Tadeusz Silnicki, Kazimierz Gołąb, Arcybiskup Świnka i jego epoka, Poznań 1956.
- Szczęsny Skibiński, Bolesław Chrobry a Przemysł II. O królewskich pomnikach w katedrze poznańskiej, [in:] Przemysł II. Odnowienie Królestwa Polskiego, ed. J. Krzyżaniakowej, Poznań 1997, pp. 299–306.
- Andrzej Skulimowski, Skulimowski M., Magister Mikołaj, nadworny lekarz książąt wielkopolskich w II połowie XIII wieku i na początku XIV wieku, [in:] "Archiwum Historii Medycyny", vol. XXIV, 1958, nr ¾, pp. 285–290.
- Krzysztof Skupieński, Miejsce notariatu publicznego wśród świadków realizacji programu politycznego arcybiskupa Jakuba Świnki, [in:] "Kwartalnik Historyczny", vol. XCVI, 1989, nr 3, pp. 63–84.
- Aleksander Swieżawski, Dux regni Poloniae i heres regni Poloniae. Ze studiów nad tytulaturą władców polskich na przełomie XIII i XIV wieku, [in:] "Przegląd Historyczny", vol. LXXX, 1989, t. 3, pp. 429–438.
- Aleksander Swieżawski, Plany koronacyjne Henryka Probusa. Królestwo polskie czy królestwo krakowskie?, [in:] "Studia z Dziejów Państwa i Prawa Polskiego", vol. IV, 1999, pp. 139–146.
- Aleksander Swieżawski, Przemysł – król Polski, Wydawnictwo "DiG", Warsaw 2006.
- Błażej Śliwiński, Rola polityczna możnowładztwa na Pomorzu Gdańskim w czasach Mściwoja II, UG, Gdańsk 1987.
- Błażej Śliwiński, Rządy Przemysła II na Pomorzu Gdańskim w latach 1294–1295, [in:] "Zapiski Historyczne", vol. LIX, 1994, t. 1, pp. 7–27.
- Agnieszka Teterycz, Małopolska elita władzy wobec zamieszek politycznych w Małopolsce w XIII wieku, [in:] Społeczeństwo Polski Średniowiecznej. Zbiór Studiów, ed. S. Kuczyńskiego, vol. IX, Warsaw 2001, pp. 65–87.
- Jan Tęgowski, Uwagi o pieczęciach Przemysła II, "Acta Universitatis Nicolai Copernici. Historia XXIV. Nauki Humanistyczno-Społeczne", t. 204, 1990, pp. 175–183.
- Jan Tęgowski, Zabiegi księcia kujawskiego Władysława Łokietka o tron krakowski w latach 1288–1293, [in:] "Zapiski Kujawsko-Dobrzyńskie", vol. VI, 1987, pp. 43–68.
- Kazimierz Tymieniecki, Odnowienie dawnego królestwa polskiego, [in:] "Kwartalnik Historyczny", t. XXXIV, 1920, pp. 30–87.
- Bolesław Ulanowski, Kilka słów o małżonkach Przemysława II, [in:] "Rozprawy i Sprawozdania z Posiedzeń Wydziału Historyczno-Filozoficznego Akademii Umiejętności", vol. XVII, 1884, pp. 252–274.
- Zofia Waniek, Powiązania genealogiczne askańsko-wielkopolskie w XII i XIII wieku, [in:] "Prace Komisji Historii", XI 1975, Bydgoskie Towarzystwo Naukowe. Prace Wydziału Nauk Humanistycznych, serie C, nr 16, pp. 89–101.
- Jacek Wiesiołowski, Zabójstwo księżny Ludgardy w 1283 r., [in:] "Kronika miasta Poznania", 1993, nr 1–2, pp. 7–22.
- Bronisław Włodarski, Elżbieta-Ryksa, [in:] Polski Słownik Biograficzny, vol. VI, Kraków 1948, pp. 241–242.
- Bronisław Włodarski, Polska i Czechy w drugiej połowie XIII i na początku XIV wieku, Lwów 1931.
- Jerzy Wyrozumski, Gospodarcze i społeczne uwarunkowania procesu zjednoczeniowego w Polsce XIII wieku, [in:] Przemysł II. Odnowienie Królestwa Polskiego, ed. J. Krzyżaniakowej, Poznań 1997, pp. 57–64.
- Stanisław Zachorowski, Wiek XIII i panowanie Władysława Łokietka, [in:] Grodecki R., Zachorowski S., Dąbrowski J., Dzieje Polski średniowiecznej w dwu tomach, vol. I, by 1933, Kraków 1926, ed. II, Kraków 1995.
- Krystyna Zielińska, Zjednoczenie Pomorza Gdańskiego z Wielkopolską. Umowa kępińska 1282 r., Toruń 1968.
- Benedykt Zientara, Przemysł II, [in:] Poczet królów i książąt polskich, Warsaw 1984, pp. 212–217.
- Paweł Żmudzki, Studium podzielonego Królestwa. Książę Leszek Czarny, Warsaw 2000.

== Chronicles ==
- Chronica Oliviensis auctore Stanislao abbate Olivensi, ed. W. Kętrzyński, [in:] MPH, vol. VI, Kraków 1893, pp. 310–350.
- Cronica Przbkonis de Tradenina dicti Pulcaua, [in:] Fontes rerum Bohemicarum, vol. V, ed. J. Emler, Prague 1893.
- Jan Długosz, Roczniki, czyli kroniki sławnego Królestwa Polskiego, fr. VII, Warsaw 1974.
- Kodeks dyplomatyczny Małopolski, ed. F. Piekosiński, vol. III, Kraków 1887.
- Kodeks dyplomatyczny Wielkopolski, ed. I. Zakrzewski, vol. I–V, Poznań 1877–1908.
- Kronika książąt polskich, ed. Z. Węglewski, [in:] MPH, vol. III, Lwów 1878, pp. 423–578.
- Kronika wielkopolska, ed. B. Kürbis, transl. K. Abgarowicz, introduction and commentaries, B. Kürbis, Warsaw 1965.
- Petra Zitovskeho kronika zbraslavska [in:] Fontes rerum Bohemicarum, vol. IV, ed. J. Emler, Prague 1884.
- Rocznik Traski, [in:] MPH, vol. II, Lwów 1872, pp. 826–861.

== See also ==
- History of Poland (966–1385)
- Dukes of Greater Poland
- Jakub Świnka
- Royal coronations in Poland

Przemysł II Piast dynasty Born: 14 October 1257 Died: 8 February 1296
Regnal titles
Preceded by Bolesław the Pious	Duke of Poznań; 1273 – 1296	Succeeded by Władysław I Łokietek
Preceded by Bolesław the Pious	Duke of Greater Poland, Kalisz, and Gniezno; 1279 – 1296	Succeeded by Władysław I Łokietek
Preceded by Bolesław the Pious	Duke of Wieluń; 1279 – 1281	Succeeded by Henry Probus
Preceded by Henry Probus	Duke of Wieluń; 1287 – 1296	Succeeded by Władysław I Łokietek
Preceded by Henry Probus	High Duke of Poland; 1290 – 1291	Succeeded by Wenceslaus II of Bohemia
Preceded by Bolesław II the Bold	King of Poland; 1295 – 1296	Succeeded by Wenceslaus II of Bohemia
Preceded by Mestwin II	Duke of Pomerelia; 1294 – 1296	Succeeded by Leszek of Inowrocław
