= Przemysł of Inowrocław =

Polish prince

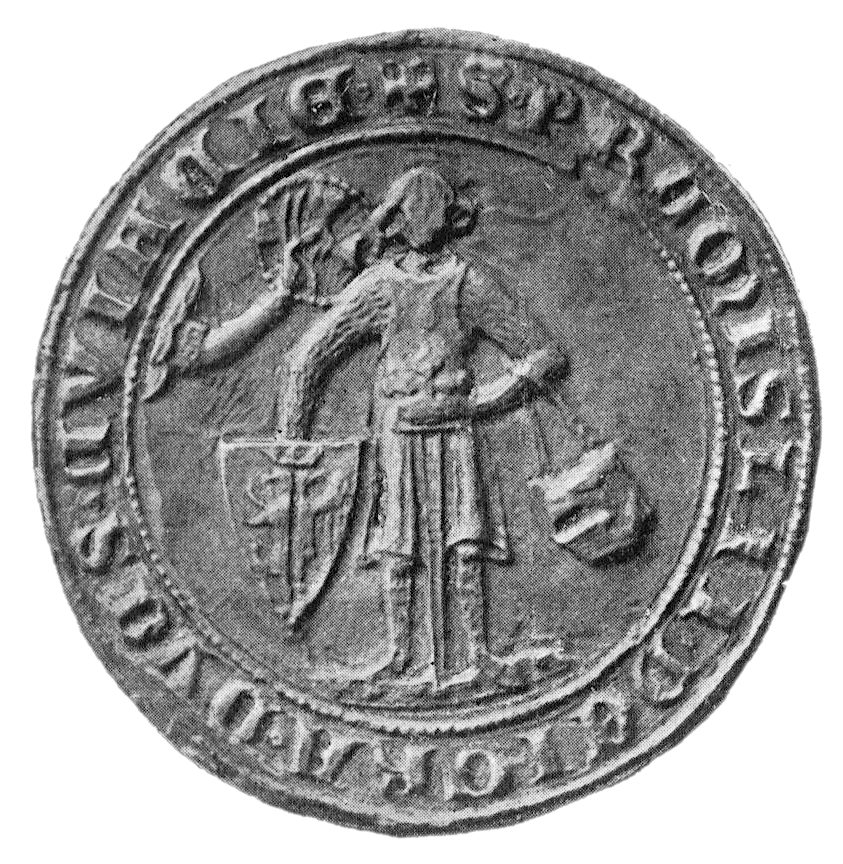
Przemysł of Inowrocław's Seal, 1307.

Przemysł of Inowrocław (pl: Przemysł inowrocławski; ca. 1278 – November 1338 / 16 February 1339), was a Polish prince member of the House of Piast, Duke of Inowrocław during 1287–1314 (under the regency of his mother until 1294 and his brother during 1294–1296), after 1300 vassal of King Wenceslaus II of Bohemia, Duke of Dobrzyń during 1303–1305, after 1306 vassal of the Kingdom of Poland, Governor of the Pomerelia (Gdańsk Pomerania) during 1306–1309 (on behalf of his uncle Władysław I Łokietek), after 1314 ruler over Bydgoszcz and Wyszogród, Duke of Inowrocław after 1320/1324, in 1327 he exchange Inowrocław for Sieradz.

He was the second son of Ziemomysł of Kuyavia and Salome, daughter of Sambor II, Duke of Pomerania. His godfather was probably Przemysł II of Greater Poland, who acted as a mediator in the meeting at Ląd between Bolesław the Pious and Leszek II the Black, where Ziemomysł finally could recover his Duchy.

== Life ==
After the death of their father in 1287, Przemysł and his brothers Leszek and Kazimierz III inherited his domains; however, because they are minors, remained under the regency of their mother and paternal half-uncle Władysław I Łokietek until 1294, when Leszek, as the oldest brother, attained his majority and assumed the government and the guardianship of his brothers. Przemysł attained his majority ca. 1296, but initially ruled jointly with his brothers.

In 1300, he was forced to recognise the sovereignty of Wenceslaus II. During 1303-1312, he ruled Inowrocław on behalf of his brother Leszek, who was in captivity in Bohemia. In 1303, he supported the revolt against his uncle Siemowit of Dobrzyń, which resulted in his direct government over domains until 1305.

In 1306, he paid homage to his uncle Władysław I, in return for which he was appointed Governor of Gdańsk Pomerania, with his base in Świecie. In addition, he tried without success to recover from the Teutonic Order the Michałów Land (with money received from Gerward, Bishop of Kujawy). The post of Governor was lost in 1309, as a result of the invasion of the Teutonic Order.

Shortly after, Przemysł and his brother Casimir III were involved in a financial dispute with Bishop Gerward. In December 1310, both princes looted the district of Raciąż, which belonged to the Bishopric; on 2 January 1311, the Bishop excommunicated both for their robbery and in response, Przemysł and Casimir III imprisoned both the Bishop and his brother Stanisław, Provost of Włocławek. Both parties made an agreement only on 22 November: the Bishop and his brother were released, and the excommunication against the princes was lifted.

In 1314, the formal division of the paternal inheritance between Przemysł and his brothers; he received the northern part of the Duchy, with the main districts of Bydgoszcz and Wyszogród. On 11 June 1318, Przemysł and Leszek entered into a treaty of mutual inheritance, and a few days later, between 18-23 June, Przemysł took part in the meeting at Sulejów. Two years later, in 1320, he testified during the Polish-Teutonic trial.

Between 1320/1324, Leszek unexpectedly abdicated the government, leaving all the Duchy to Przemysł, who in 1325 granted the Magdeburg Law to the district of Solec Kujawski.

Together with his brother, he maintains his alliance with Władysław I. In view of the constant wars against the Teutonic Order, and in order to facilitate the Polish King's open warfare, between 28 May 1327 / 14 October 1328, Przemysł agreed to exchange his ancestral domain of Inowrocław for Sieradz. In this conflict, the new Duke of Sieradz tried to serve as mediator; however, this didn't protect his domain from being ravaged by the Teutonic Knights.

Przemysł died between November 1338 and 16 February 1339, because witnesses of the Polish-Teutonic trial refer to him as recently deceased at this point. He never married or had offspring, and it is unknown where he was buried.
