= Leszek of Inowrocław =

Polish prince

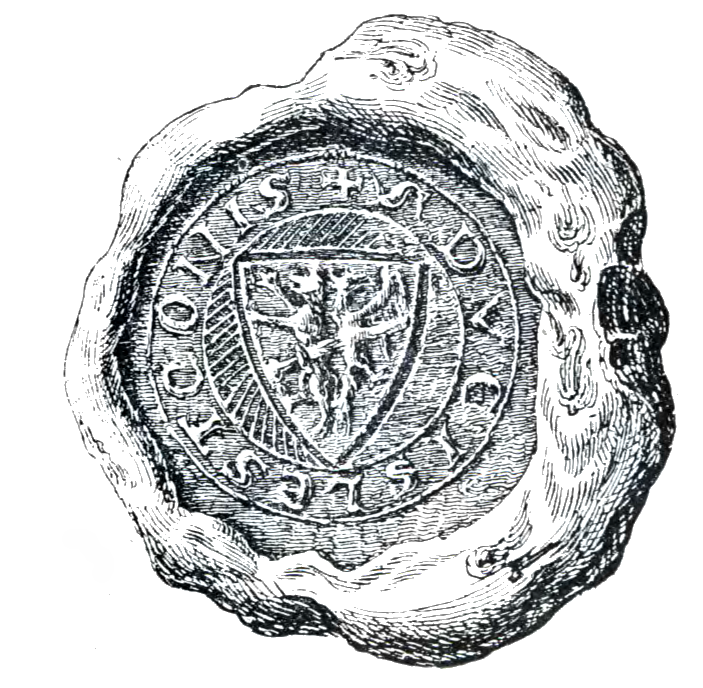
Leszek of Inowrocław's Seal.

Leszek of Inowrocław (pl: Leszek inowrocławski; 1275/1276 – after 27 April 1339), was a Polish prince member of the House of Piast. He was Duke of Inowrocław from 1287 to 1314 (under the regency of his mother until 1294), Duke of Pomerania (Gdańsk Pomerania) in 1296, and ruler over Wyszogród from 1296. In 1300 he paid homage to King Wenceslaus II of Bohemia, in 1303 sold to the Teutonic Order the Michałów Land, during 1303–1312 in captivity in Bohemia, since 1312 vassal of the Kingdom of Poland, during 1314-1320/1324 sole ruler over Inowrocław, abdicated.

He was the eldest son of Ziemomysł of Kuyavia and Salome, daughter of Sambor II, Duke of Pomerania.

== Life ==
After the death of their father in 1287, Leszek and his younger brothers Przemysł and Kazimierz III of Gniewkowo inherited his domains; however, because they are minors, remained under the regency of their mother and paternal half-uncle Władysław I Łokietek until 1294, when Leszek, as the oldest brother, attained his majority and assumed the government and the guardianship of his brothers. He received a good education (contemporary sources even refer to him as litteratus).

In 1296, using the confusion following the death of Przemysł II, he managed to claim the Duchy of Pomerania, under the pretext of being a maternal descendant of the Samborides; however, shortly, he was forced to resign the Duchy to Władysław I, who gave him in compensation the castellany of Wyszogród.

In 1300, after the pressure of Wenceslaus II of Bohemia (recently crowned King of Poland), he paid homage to him. In 1303, Leszek was involved in a military conflict with his uncle Siemowit of Dobrzyń; this prolonged fight caused financial difficulties to the Duke of Inowrocław and forced him to pledge the Michałów Land to the Teutonic Order. Soon after, and for unknown reasons, he went to Hungary to be reunited with his uncle Władysław I; because he had to pass through areas controlled by Wenceslaus II, he was captured and imprisoned and sent to Bohemia. His captivity lasted until 1312.

In 1314, Leszek agreed to become a vassal of Władysław I, shortly after, he finally decided to make the division of his domains with his brothers. As the oldest, Leszek kept the most important part of the Duchy, including the capital Inowrocław. Four years later, in 1318, he signed with his brother Przemysł a treaty of mutual inheritance.

Between 1320-1324 and for unknown reasons, Leszek abdicated the government of his domains, giving all the power to Przemysł. In 1320 and 1339, he testified during the Polish-Teutonic trial.

Leszek died after 27 April 1339, and it is unknown where he was buried. He never married or had offspring.

== Ancestry ==
Ancestors of Leszek of Inowrocław

8. Konrad I of Masovia
4. Casimir I of Kuyavia
9. Agafia of Rus
2. Ziemomysł of Kuyavia
10. Henry II the Pious
5. Constance of Wrocław
11. Anna of Bohemia
1. Leszek of Inowrocław
12. Mestwin I, Duke of Pomerania
6. Sambor II, Duke of Pomerania
13. Swinisław of Poland
3. Salome of Pomerania
14. Henry II of Mecklenburg
7. Matilda of Mecklenburg
15. Kristina of Skåne
