= Ziemomysł of Kuyavia =

Polish prince

- Issue: Fenenna: Leszek; Przemysł; Kazimierz III of Gniewkowo

Ziemomysł of Kuyavia (Polish: Ziemomysł inowrocławski; c. 1245 – October/24 December 1287), was a Polish prince, member of the House of Piast, duke of Inowrocław during 1267–1271 and 1278–1287, and ruler over Bydgoszcz during 1267–1269 and 1278–1287.

== Early years ==
Ziemomysł was the second son of Casimir I of Kuyavia and his second wife Constance of Wrocław, daughter of Henry II the Pious. In 1257, his mother died, and his father soon married for the third time with Euphrosyne, daughter of Casimir I of Opole. Ziemomysł's stepmother soon caused conflicts in the family with her attempts to obtain territorial benefits for her own children (the eldest of them was the future Polish King Władysław I Łokietek) at the detriment of Ziemomysł and his older full-brother Leszek II the Black; some chronicles even accused Euphrosyne of attempting to poison both stepsons.

== Reign ==
After his father's death in 1267, Ziemomysł inherited the district of Inowrocław. At the beginning of his reign in the small principality, he managed to survive the invasion of the considerable forces of King Ottokar II of Bohemia, who was bound to a Crusade against Lithuania. Was probably at this point that Ziemomysł established close contacts with the Teutonic Order and Sambor II, Duke of Pomerania, alliances which soon brought him serious troubles – the revolt of his own subjects.

The conflict clearly emerged after Sambor II (his father-in-law since 1268) loaned Ziemomysł some German knights. This preference to foreigners disliked the local knighthood, and caused an armed conflict led by the bishop of Kujawy, Wolimir, in 1269. The rebels called the very well-known anti-German Bolesław the Pious to help them. Bolesław took Radziejów, Kruszwica and the castle in Bydgoszcz. Only through rapid action did Ziemomysł and the grant of further privileges to Bishop Wolimir allow him to regain temporary control of his lands.

In 1271, Ziemomysł was involved in the Pomerelian affairs, in which he supported his father-in-law, Sambor II, against Mestwin II. This decision triggered another invasion of Bolesław the Pious, which, combined with another revolt of his subjects, forced Ziemomysł to escape. Ziemomysł recovered his lands only in 1278 as a result of an agreement between Bolesław the Pious and Leszek II the Black in Ląd, where Leszek II returned Inowrocław to his brother only after he promised to distance himself from all his German advisors. Despite the end of the conflict, Bolesław the Pious kept Radziejów and Kruszwica.

The complete normalization of Ziemomysł's rule took place two years later at the Congress of Rzepka, where, after an agreement with Mestwin II, it was stipulated that after his death, the castellany of Wyszogród had to return to Inowrocław. The final break with his pro-German policy was in 1284, when Ziemomysł supported his brother Leszek in a war against the Teutonic Order. The details of this conflict are unknown. Ziemomysł also began the process of giving Town privileges to his subjects, endowing them upon Gniewkowo.

Ziemomysł died between October and 24 December 1287. It is unknown where he was buried, although it is assumed that it happened in the capital of the duchy, Inowrocław.

== Marriage and issue ==
Probably in 1268, Ziemomysł married Salomea, daughter of Duke Sambor II of Pomerania. They had six children:

1. Euphemia (d. young, 3 March 1268/1278);
2. Fenenna (ca. 1268/1277 – 1295) married Andrew III of Hungary;
3. Constance (1268/1280 – 8 August 1331), a nun;
4. Leszek (1275/1276 – after 27 April 1339);
5. Przemysł (ca. 1278 – November 1338/16 February 1339);
6. Kazimierz III of Gniewkowo (1280/1284 – 22 August 1345/13 May 1350).

Because his sons were minors at the time of his death, his widow and half-brother Władysław I Łokietek took the regency on their behalf.
