= Waldemar, Margrave of Brandenburg-Stendal =

Margrave of Brandenburg-Stendal from 1308 to 1319

Waldemar
- Margrave of Brandenburg-Stendal
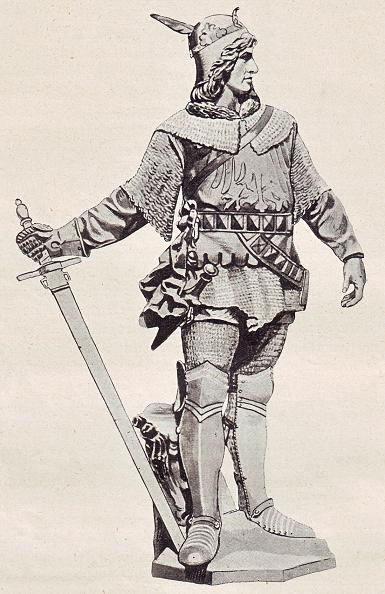
- Statue of Waldemar at the Mühlendamm Bridge in Berlin, created in 1894/95 by the sculptor Max Unger, prototype for the early monuments in the Siegesallee
- Reign: 1308–1319
- Born: c. 1280
- Died: 14 August 1319; Bärwalde, Brandenburg
- Noble family: House of Ascania
- Spouse: Agnes of Brandenburg
- Father: Conrad, Margrave of Brandenburg-Stendal
- Mother: Constance of Greater Poland

Waldemar the Great (German: Waldemar der Große; c. 1280 – 14 August 1319), a member of the House of Ascania, was Margrave of Brandenburg-Stendal from 1308 until his death. He became sole ruler of the Margraviate of Brandenburg upon the death of his cousin John V of Brandenburg-Salzwedel in 1317. Waldemar is known as the last in the line of Ascanian margraves starting with Albert the Bear in 1157; he was only succeeded by his minor cousin Henry II, who died one year later.

== Life ==
He was a son of Margrave Conrad of Brandenburg-Stendal and his wife Constance, eldest daughter of the Piast duke Przemysł I of Greater Poland. Waldemar was co-regent from 1302, and succeeded as margrave upon the death of his uncle Otto IV in 1308.

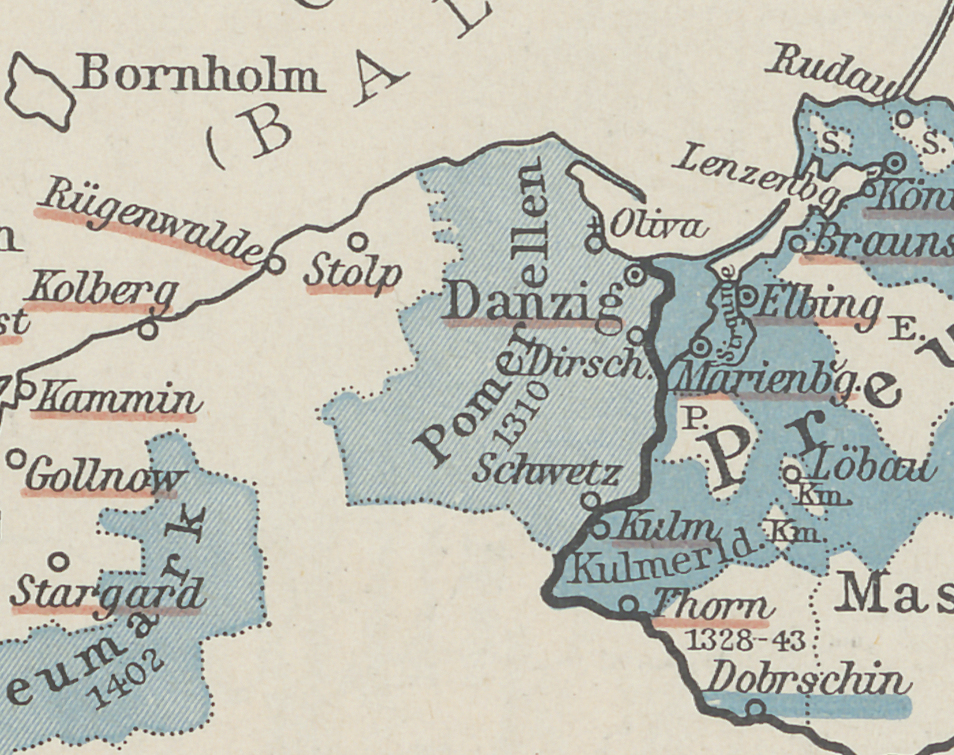
Pomerelia within a map of the State of the Teutonic Order in 1410

In 1307 Waldemar signed an agreement with the Swienca family ceding him the lands of Pomerelia (Gdańsk Pomerania), whereafter Brandenburg troops occupied Świecie, Tczew and all strategic locations up to Gdańsk (Danzig). In turn, the Polish king Władysław I called for the support of the Teutonic Knights, and after their takeover of Danzig, Waldemar by the 1309 Treaty of Soldin relinquished his claims on Pomerelia east of the Łeba River to the Teutonic Order for a payment of 10,000 silver Mark. The castle districts Schlawe and Stolp including the Swienca residence of Rügenwalde at first remained with Brandenburg.

In 1309, Waldemar attempted to take the city of Rostock, but the citizens shut the gates against him. In 1312, Waldemar also waged war against Margrave Frederick I of Meissen. Frederick was captured and arrested; to regain his freedom, he had to cede the March of Lusatia as well as the towns of Torgau and Großenhain to Brandenburg and to pay a ransom of 32,000 silver Mark. In the Imperial election of 1314, Waldemar voted for the Wittelsbach candidate Louis IV against his Habsburg rival Frederick the Fair. In 1316, Waldemar again occupied Dresden until the feud with Meissen was finally brought to an end in 1317.

In the ongoing conflict with Prince Henry II of Mecklenburg, Waldemar supported the citizens of Stralsund against an impending Mecklenburg invasion and occupied the Lordship of Stargard, a former possession of Henry's late wife Beatrix of Brandenburg. Thereby, he provoked a large coalition of Mecklenburg, Werle, and the Kingdom of Denmark against him. In August 1316, Waldemar's troops were defeated near Gransee. According to the 1317 Treaty of Templin, the margrave had to surrender Stargard and Neubrandenburg to Mecklenburg. He also had to waive the previous Pomerelian acquisitions of Schlawe and Stolp, which passed to Duke Wartislaw IV of Pomerania.

In 1319 Waldemar acquired the Silesian towns of Züllichau and Schwiebus.

== Family ==
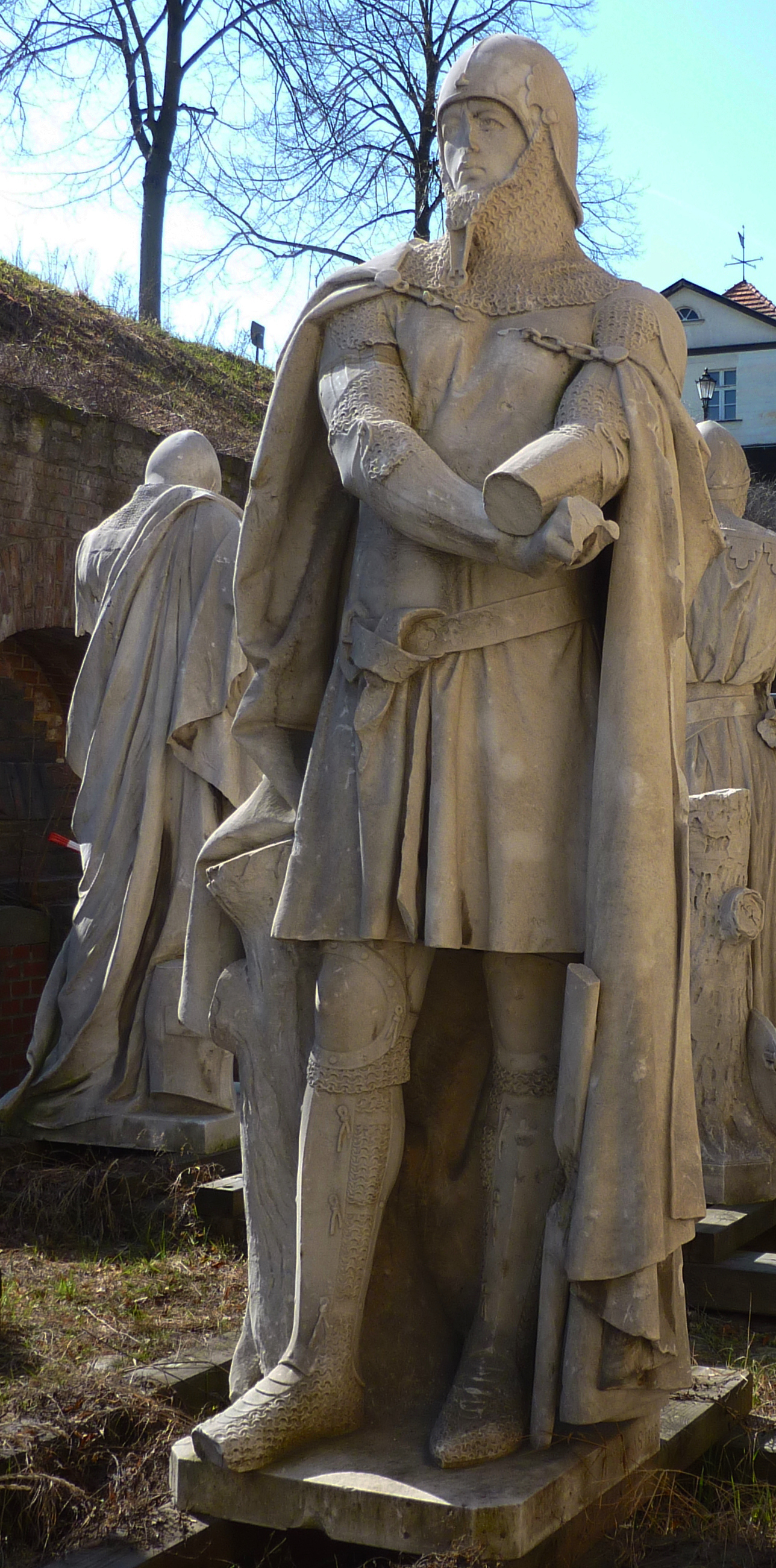
Statue by Reinhold Begas as part of the Siegesallee, 1900

In 1309 he married his cousin Agnes (c. 1296–1334), a daughter of Margrave Hermann of Brandenburg-Salzwedel. The marriage remained childless.

Waldemar was the last governing member of the Brandenburg line of the Ascanian House. With the death of his cousin John V in 1317, the younger Salzwedel line of the Brandenburg margraves became extinct. From 1318 Waldemar also acted as a guardian for his minor cousin Henry II, Margrave of Brandenburg-Stendal. His advance towards the Prussian lands was resumed more than 200 years later, when both Brandenburg and the Duchy of Prussia were under the rule of the Hohenzollern dynasty.

After Waldemar's death, his wife Agnes secondly married Duke Otto of Brunswick-Göttingen in December 1319. When Waldemar's ward Henry II died in July 1320, the Brandenburg branch of the Ascanian house died out in 1320. As a reverted fief, the margraviate fell back to the Wittelsbach king Louis IV. In 1323, he enfeoffed his eldest son Louis with Brandenburg, ignoring the claims of the Ascanian princes of Anhalt.

== False Waldemar ==
In 1348, an impostor appeared in the Archbishopric of Magdeburg and successfully claimed that he was Waldemar, returning from pilgrimage to the Holy Land after somebody else had been buried in his place. Quickly gaining support due to the rivalries between the Wittelsbach and Luxembourg dynasties, King Charles IV reinvested him for about two years before "the last Ascanian" was unmasked and fled to the Anhalt court in Dessau, where he spent the rest of his life.

== Ancestry ==
Ancestors of Waldemar, Margrave of Brandenburg-Stendal

16. Otto I, Margrave of Brandenburg
8. Albert II, Margrave of Brandenburg
17. Ada of Holland
4. John I, Margrave of Brandenburg
18. Conrad II, Margrave of Lusatia
9. Matilda of Groitzsch
19. Elisabeth of Poland
2. Conrad, Margrave of Brandenburg-Stendal
20. Valdemar I of Denmark
10. Valdemar II of Denmark
21. Sophia of Minsk
5. Sophie of Denmark
22. Sancho I of Portugal
11. Berengaria of Portugal
23. Dulce of Aragon
1. Waldemar, Margrave of Brandenburg-Stendal
24. Odon of Poznań
12. Władysław Odonic
25. Viacheslava Yaroslavna of Halych
6. Przemysł I of Greater Poland
13. Jadwiga
3. Constance of Greater Poland
28. Henry I the Bearded
14. Henry II the Pious
29. Hedwig of Andechs
7. Elisabeth of Wrocław
30. Ottokar I of Bohemia
15. Anne of Bohemia
31. Constance of Hungary

Waldemar, Margrave of Brandenburg-Stendal House of Ascania Born: c. 1280 Died: 14 August 1319
Preceded by Otto IV	Margrave of Brandenburg; 1308–1319	Succeeded by Henry II
