= Elisabeth of Wrocław =

Polish duchess

- Duchess consort of Greater Poland
- Born: c. 1232
- Died: 16 January 1265 (aged 32–33); Modrze, Poznań, Duchy of Greater Poland
- Noble family: House of Piast (by birth and marriage)
- Spouse: Przemysł I of Greater Poland
- Issue: Constance, Margravine of Brandenburg-Stendal; Euphrosyne of Greater Poland; Anna of Greater Poland; Euphemia of Greater Poland; Przemysł II
- Father: Henry II the Pious
- Mother: Anne of Bohemia

Elisabeth of Wrocław (Polish: Elżbieta wrocławska) (c. 1232 – 16 January 1265), also known as Elisabeth of Poland, was a daughter of Henry II the Pious and his wife, Anna of Bohemia. She was a member of the House of Piast and was Duchess consort of Greater Poland by marriage.

== Family ==
Elisabeth was the seventh of ten children born to her parents. Her siblings included: Bolesław II the Bald, Mieszko, Duke of Lubusz, Henry III the White, Konrad I, Duke of Silesia-Glogau, Ladislaus of Salzburg, Gertrude, Duchess of Masovia and Constance, Duchess of Kujavia.

Elisabeth's maternal grandparents were Ottokar I of Bohemia and his second wife, Constance of Hungary. Constance was daughter of Béla III of Hungary and his first wife, Agnes of Antioch. Elisabeth's paternal grandparents were Henry I the Bearded and his wife, Hedwig of Andechs (later canonized a saint in the Roman Catholic Church).

== Life events ==
Elisabeth spent her childhood in Sanctuary of St. Jadwiga in Trzebnica where she would have lived with her paternal grandmother Hedwig, who would have been a big influence to her granddaughter. It is not certain whether there was pressure for Elisabeth to join the monastery. Elisabeth remained at Trzebnica until she was kidnapped by her brother Bolesław II the Bald because her family wanted her to marry Przemysł I of Greater Poland.

The marriage was for political reasons like most royal marriages of the time. Przemysł wanted to regain some of his father's lost lands in Silesia. The marriage helped the reincorporation of Kalisz into Greater Poland.

Little is known about the rule of Elisabeth as Duchess consort of her husband's lands. In 1250 she founded a monastery in Owińska. Some nuns were brought to it from her childhood home of Trzebnica.

Elisabeth and Przemysł had five children:

1. Constance of Greater Poland (1245/46 – 8 October 1281); married in 1260 Conrad, Margrave of Brandenburg-Stendal.
2. Euphrosyne of Greater Poland (1247/50 – 17/19 February 1298), Abbess of St. Clara in Trzebnica.
3. Anna of Greater Poland (1253 – aft. 26 June 1295), Abbess at Owińska.
4. Euphemia of Greater Poland (1253 – 5 September 1298), twin of Anna; a nun at St. Clara, Wrocław.
5. Przemysł II (b. posthumously, 14 October 1257 – 8 February 1296).

When Elisabeth's husband died on 4 June 1257, he left Elisabeth her dower, in which was an estate in Modrze. Elisabeth died on her estate on 16 January 1265 and was buried in the Poznań cathedral.

Elisabeth's granddaughter from her son was Elisabeth Richeza of Poland who became the second wife of Wenceslaus II of Bohemia.

== See also ==
- List of kidnappings
- List of solved missing person cases

== Ancestry ==
Ancestors of Elisabeth of Wrocław

16. Władysław II the Exile
8. Bolesław I the Tall
17. Agnes of Babenberg
4. Henry I the Bearded
18. ?
9. Christina
19. ?
2. Henry II the Pious
20. Berthold I of Istria
10. Berthold IV, Duke of Merania
21. Hedwig of Wittelsbach
5. Hedwig of Andechs
22. Dedi III, Margrave of Lusatia
11. Agnes of Rochlitz
23. Matilda of Heinsberg
1. Elisabeth of Wrocław
24. Vladislaus I, Duke of Bohemia
12. Vladislav II of Bohemia
25. Richeza of Berg
6. Ottakar I of Bohemia
26. Louis I, Landgrave of Thuringia
13. Judith of Thuringia
27. Hedwig of Gudensberg
3. Anna of Bohemia
28. Géza II of Hungary
14. Béla III of Hungary
29. Euphrosyne of Kiev
7. Constance of Hungary
30. Raynald of Châtillon
15. Agnes of Antioch
31. Constance of Antioch
