= 1253 =

1253 in various calendars
- Gregorian calendar: 1253; MCCLIII
- Ab urbe condita: 2006
- Armenian calendar: 702; ԹՎ ՉԲ
- Assyrian calendar: 6003
- Balinese saka calendar: 1174–1175
- Bengali calendar: 659–660
- Berber calendar: 2203
- English Regnal year: 37 Hen. 3 – 38 Hen. 3
- Buddhist calendar: 1797
- Burmese calendar: 615
- Byzantine calendar: 6761–6762
- Chinese calendar: 壬子年 (Water Rat); 3950 or 3743 — to — 癸丑年 (Water Ox); 3951 or 3744
- Coptic calendar: 969–970
- Discordian calendar: 2419
- Ethiopian calendar: 1245–1246
- Hebrew calendar: 5013–5014
- Hindu calendars
- Vikram Samvat: 1309–1310
- Shaka Samvat: 1174–1175
- Kali Yuga: 4353–4354
- Holocene calendar: 11253
- Igbo calendar: 253–254
- Iranian calendar: 631–632
- Islamic calendar: 650–651
- Japanese calendar: Kenchō 5 (建長５年)
- Javanese calendar: 1162–1163
- Julian calendar: 1253; MCCLIII
- Korean calendar: 3586
- Minguo calendar: 659 before ROC 民前659年
- Nanakshahi calendar: −215
- Thai solar calendar: 1795–1796
- Tibetan calendar: ཆུ་ཕོ་བྱི་བ་ལོ་ (male Water-Rat); 1379 or 998 or 226 — to — ཆུ་མོ་གླང་ལོ་ (female Water-Ox); 1380 or 999 or 227

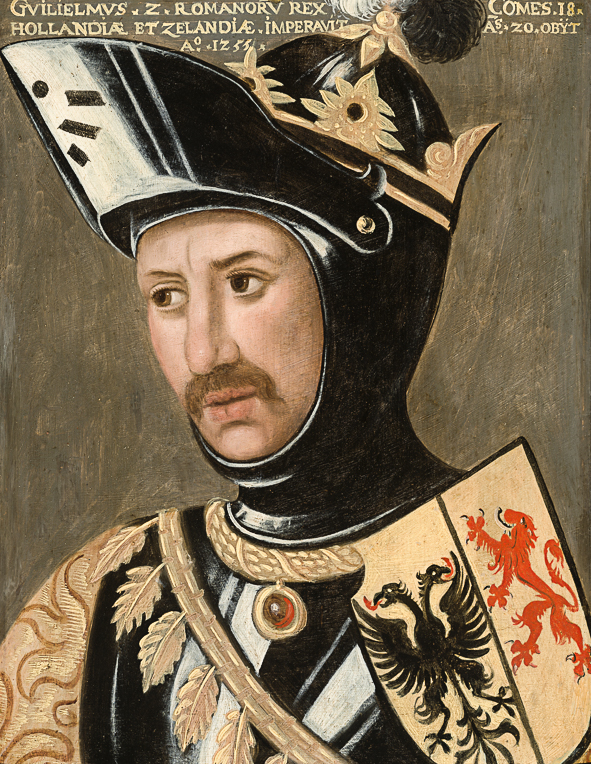
William II of Holland (1227–1256)

Year 1253 (MCCLIII) was a common year starting on Wednesday of the Julian calendar.

== Events ==
=== By place ===
==== Europe ====
- January 18 – King Henry I of Cyprus ("the Fat") dies and is succeeded by his son Hugh II, who is only a few months old. His mother, Queen Plaisance of Antioch, claims the regency of Cyprus and the titular regency of Jerusalem. The High Court of Cyprus confirms her position, but the barons of Outremer require her attendance in person before they will recognize her. John of Ibelin, count of Jaffa, remains as bailli, and Plaisance contemplates marrying John's youthful son Balian. Meanwhile, King Louis IX of France ("the Saint"), still staying at Acre, continues to administer the government.
- Summer – The Kingdom of Galicia–Volhynia becomes a vassal state to the expanding Mongol Empire. Prince Daniel of Galicia is crowned king of Ruthenia (rex Russiae) and becomes officially an Orthodox subject of the Papal States.
- July 4 – William II, count of Holland, defeats the Flemish forces under Guy of Dampierre at Westkapelle. He forced him and his mother, Margaret II, to respect the division of Flanders and Hainaut.
- July 6 – Mindaugas and his wife Morta are crowned as king and queen of Lithuania, ruling between 300,000 and 400,000 subjects.
- October 10 – German imperial forces under King Conrad IV suppress the Sicilian rebellion and recapture Naples.

==== England ====
- August 6 – King Henry III leads an expedition to Gascony, to repel a rumoured invasion from Castile. Meanwhile, Simon de Montfort returns from Gascony where he allies himself with the barons who oppose Henry.
- Henry III meets with the nobles and church leaders to reaffirm the validity of Magna Carta in exchange for taxation.

==== Levant ====
- April – An-Nasir Yusuf, Ayyubid ruler of Damascus, cedes Palestine, together with Jerusalem, Nablus and the coastline of Al-Sham to Aybak, Mamluk sultan of Egypt.

==== Asia ====
- April 28 – Nichiren, Japanese Buddhist monk, declares his intent to preach the Lotus Sutra and Namu Myōhō Renge Kyō as the true Buddhism, thus founding Nichiren Buddhism.
- May – Louis IX of France ("the Saint") dispatches William of Rubruck from Constantinople on a missionary journey to Karakorum to seek an alliance against Syrian and Egyptian Muslims.
- Mongol forces under Hulagu Khan begin a campaign against the Nizari Ismaili State. An advance guard (12,000 men) under Kitbuqa captures several fortresses in Quhistan.
- Mongol forces under Kublai Khan conquer the Dali Kingdom (modern-day Yunnan). The population migrates to Siam (modern Thailand).
- Kublai Khan introduces the baisha xiyue song and dance suite to the music of Yunnan.

=== By topic ===
==== Literature ====
- Matthew Paris, English Benedictine chronicler, completes the major part of his Chronica Majora, a chronicle of English history.

==== Religion ====
- October – Pope Innocent IV returns to Rome, after being deposed for 9 years by former Emperor Frederick II, whose clash forms an important chapter in the conflict between the Papal States and the Holy Roman Empire.
- Innocent IV offers the crown of Sicily, which he controls, to Richard of Cornwall and Charles of Anjou, both of whom refuse, and later to the 8-year-old Edmund, son of Henry III of England.
- The upper Basilica of Saint Francis of Assisi, the earliest important structure of Italian Gothic architecture, is completed in Assisi.
- Sligo Abbey, a Dominican monastery, is founded by Maurice FitzGerald, Norman chief governor of Ireland.

== Births ==
- March 1 – Mattia de Nazarei, Italian abbess and saint (d. 1319)
- March 20 – Wareru, founder of the Martaban Kingdom (assassinated 1307)
- September 11 – Dmitry Borisovich, Russian nobleman and prince of Rostov (d. 1294)
- October 17 – Ivo of Kermartin, Breton priest and saint (d. 1303)
- November 25 – Katherine of England, English princess (d. 1257)
- Amir Khusrau, Indian Sufi musician, poet and scholar (d. 1325)
- Anna of Greater Poland, Polish princess and abbess (d. 1295)
- Berengaria of Castile, Spanish princess and regent (d. 1300)
- Blanche of France, daughter of Louis IX ("the Saint") (d. 1323)
- Eschiva of Ibelin, Outremer noblewoman and regent (d. 1312)
- Eufemia of Greater Poland, Polish princess and nun (d. 1298)
- Everhardt I, count of Limburg and Hohenlimburg (d. 1308)
- Hugh II (de Lusignan), Cypriot ruler and regent (d. 1267)
- John II ("the One-Eyed"), count of Holstein-Kiel (d. 1321)
- Nikō, Japanese Buddhist monk and disciple (d. 1314)

== Deaths ==
- January 1 – Marino Morosini, doge of Venice (b. 1181)
- January 18 – Henry I ("the Fat"), king of Cyprus (b. 1217)
- April 3 – Richard of Chichester, English bishop (b. 1197)
- April 5 – Wilbrand von Käfernburg, German archbishop
- April 22 – Elias of Cortona, Italian friar and vicar general
- June 11 – Amadeus IV, Italian nobleman and knight (b. 1197)
- June 12 – Boniface II ("the Giant"), king of Thessalonica (b. 1201)
- July 8 – Theobald I, French nobleman and trouvère (b. 1201)
- July 22 – Albert IV, German nobleman and knight (b. 1180)
- August 11 – Clare of Assisi, Italian nun and saint (b. 1194)
- September 22 – Dōgen, Japanese Buddhist priest (b. 1200)
- September 23 – Wenceslaus I, king of Bohemia (b. 1205)
- October 9 – Robert Grosseteste, English bishop (b. 1168)
- October 22 – William de Vesci, English nobleman (b. 1205)
- November 16 – Agnes of Assisi, Italian abbess and saint
- November 21 – Christian II, German archbishop (b. 1185)
- November 29 – Otto II, German count palatine (b. 1206)
- Ahmad al-Tifashi, Almohad poet and anthologist (b. 1184)
