= Euphrosyne of Greater Poland =

Polish princess and abbess (died 1298)

Euphrosyne of Greater Poland (Polish: Eufrozyna wielkopolska; 1247/50 – 17/19 February 1298) was a Greater Poland princess, member of the House of Piast and abbess of St. Clara in Trzebnica.

She was the second daughter of Przemysł I, Duke of Greater Poland and Poznań, by his wife Elisabeth, daughter of Henry II the Pious, Duke of Wrocław.

== Life ==
After her father's death in 1257, Euphrosyne and her siblings remained under their mother's care, and after her death in 1265 were raised by their paternal uncle Bolesław the Pious. The religious environment of Bolesław's court certainly impacted in his nieces; all three who remained unmarried (Euphrosyne and her sisters, twins Anna and Euphemia) took the veil.

Euphrosyne became a nun in the Cistercian monastery of Trzebnica, and in 1278 she became the Abbess. Documentation from the years 1285–1297 shows a high activity of Euphrosyne as Abbess, especially in economic matters of the monastery. Presumably, during her sovereignty, in Trzebnica was transcribed the Life of her maternal great-grandmother, St. Hedwig of Andechs.
