= Romanesque House in Wrocław =

Coordinates: 51°6′44.5″N 17°2′18″E

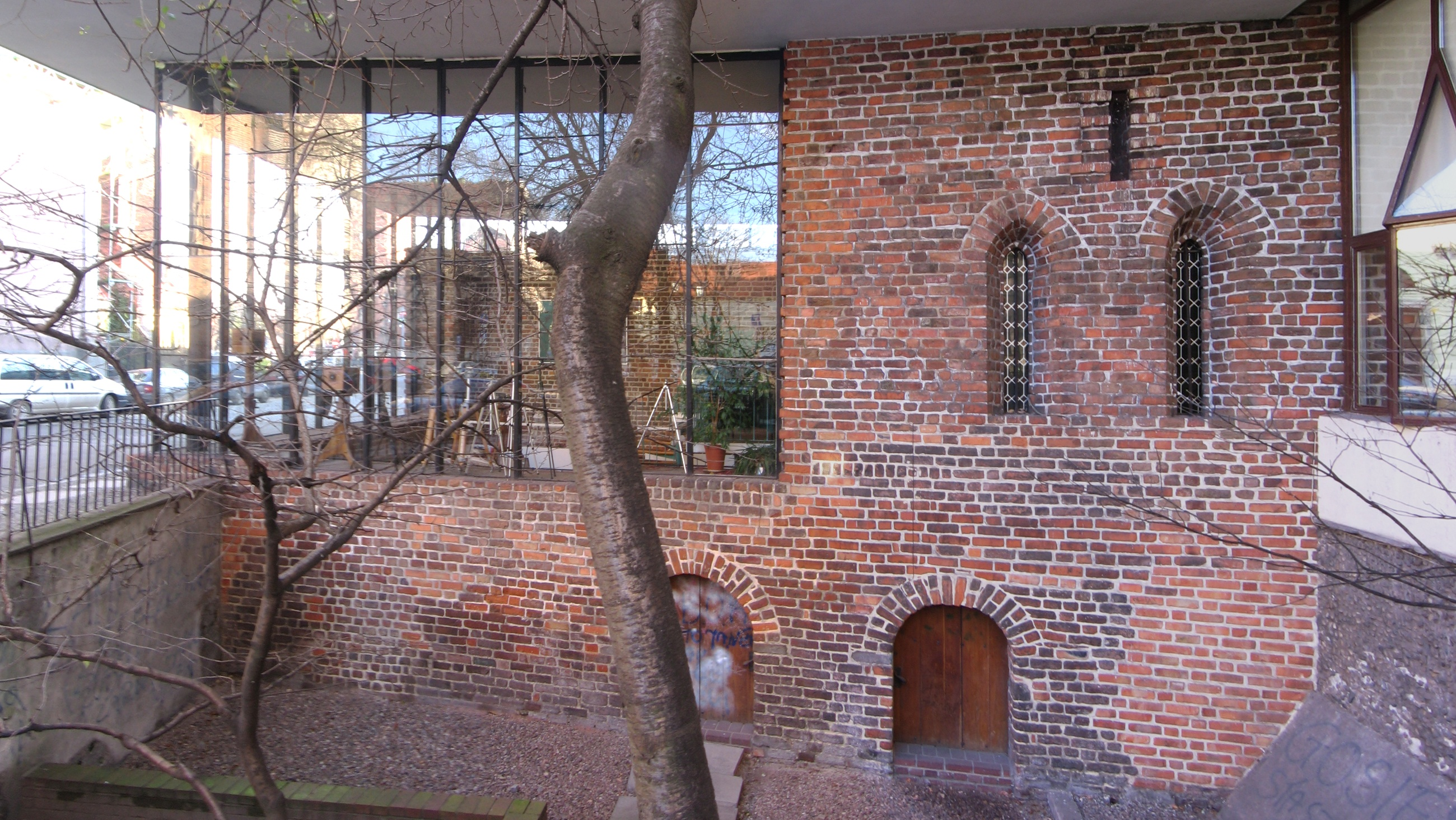
- Interactive map of the Romanesque House in Wrocław area

Romanesque House in Wrocław (Polish: Domek Romański), or House of the Ladies of Trzebnica in Wrocław (Polish: Dom Panien Trzebnickich we Wrocławiu), is a Romanesque villa at Plac Biskupa Nankiera (Bishop Nankier's Square) in Wrocław. More precisely, it is an early-Gothic building with Romanesque elements that dates back to the beginning of the 13th century (mentioned in 1208), partly reconstructed after World War II. It was the centre for the Cistercians of Trzebnica, which is why it was called the House of the Ladies of Trzebnica. Nearby, along the Kotlarska Street, were the Nowe Jatki, a medieval shopping center belonging to the monastery.

The building was erected on a trapezoidal plan made of brick laid in a Wendish thread (two-wheeled, also called Slavonic). The Romanesque elements of this building, including the arches in the central part, are mixed with Gothic details of the windows and the arches of the vaults. On each of the two floors of the building there were originally three rooms. The building was repeatedly rebuilt, and remained the property of the monastery until the dissolution of the monasteries in 1810.

During WWII the site around Bishop Nankier's Square was damaged. During the renovation in 1959, historic fragments of the oldest architectural foundation of the building located under the street level were discovered. From 1966 to 1969, the site was partially reconstructed according to the project of Henryk Dziurla. Over eight centuries, the level of neighbouring streets has risen to the height of the upper storey of the building, which is why the entrance today is subterranean. In the southern part of the lower storey there are fragments of the old barrel vaults, and on the upper floor, cross vaults.

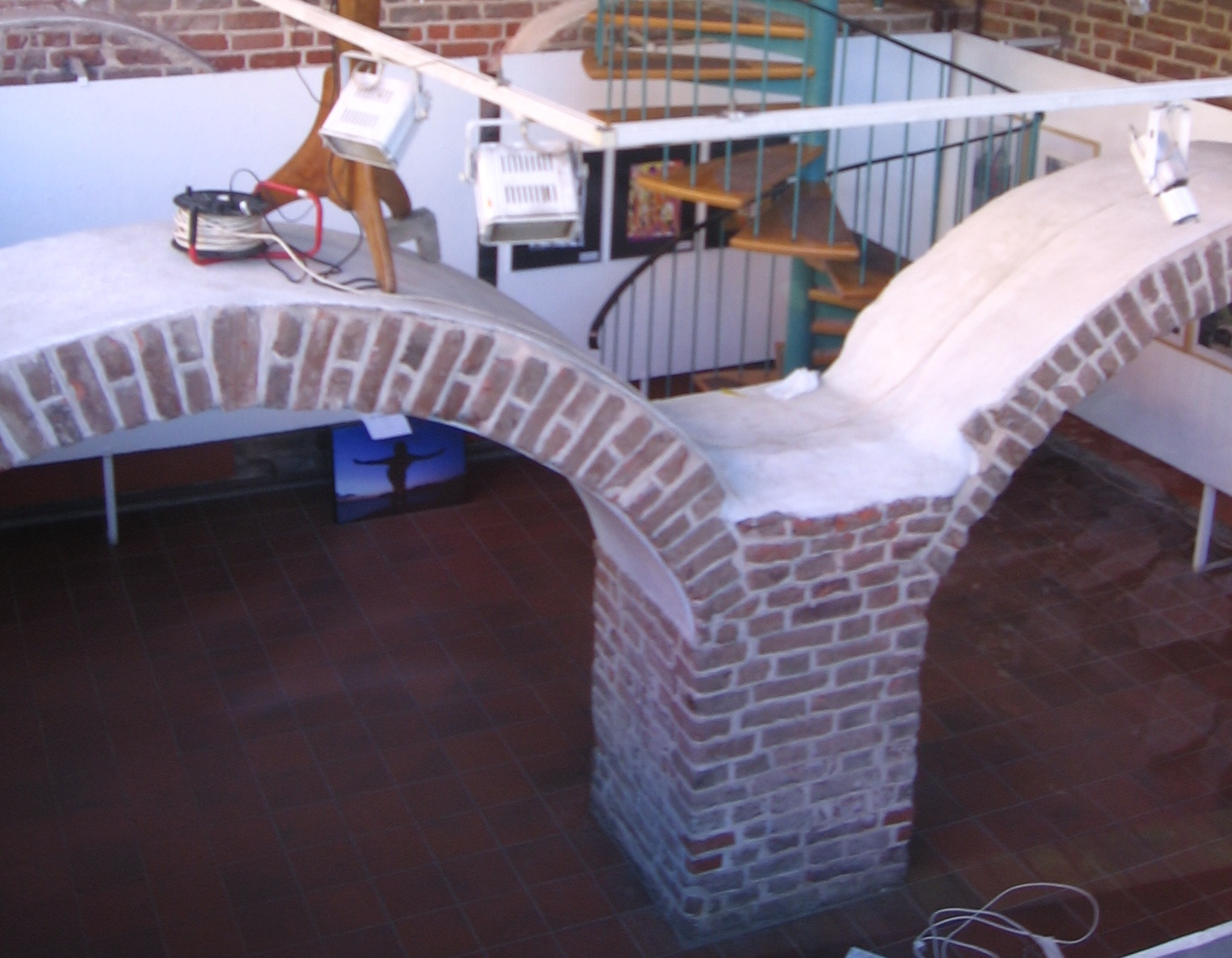
The building in use as a gallery

During the reconstruction the ceiling was partially removed, joining the upper and lower storeys, and the whole building was covered with a contemporary reinforced concrete roof. The above-ground part was glazed from the outside. The place was then adapted for the needs of the art gallery under the patronage of the Center for Cultural Arts in Wrocław (OKiS). Later, the gallery was transformed into Foto-Medium-Art Gallery, and become one of the most important Neo-avantgarde centres in Poland. Then it changed its name to the Lower Silesia Centre of Photography, "Romanesque House". From January 2017 it is called the Foto-Gen Gallery. In April 2017, a bronze plaque commemorating the Cistercian foundation "House of the Ladies of Trzebnica" was placed in the facade of the building and the name Dom Panien Trzebnickich (House of the Ladies of Trzebnica) came back into official use .

Foto-Gen Gallery specializes in showing photography and new media. There are regular exhibitions for home and international artists, presentations as well as lectures organized there. Media reportages from these events can be seen on Centre for Cultural Arts in Wrocław (OKiS) video channel, local and nationwide media.

== Bibliography ==
- Encyklopedia Wrocławia, Wrocław 2000, ISBN 83-7023-749-5
