= 1295 =

1295 in various calendars
- Gregorian calendar: 1295; MCCXCV
- Ab urbe condita: 2048
- Armenian calendar: 744; ԹՎ ՉԽԴ
- Assyrian calendar: 6045
- Balinese saka calendar: 1216–1217
- Bengali calendar: 701–702
- Berber calendar: 2245
- English Regnal year: 23 Edw. 1 – 24 Edw. 1
- Buddhist calendar: 1839
- Burmese calendar: 657
- Byzantine calendar: 6803–6804
- Chinese calendar: 甲午年 (Wood Horse); 3992 or 3785 — to — 乙未年 (Wood Goat); 3993 or 3786
- Coptic calendar: 1011–1012
- Discordian calendar: 2461
- Ethiopian calendar: 1287–1288
- Hebrew calendar: 5055–5056
- Hindu calendars
- Vikram Samvat: 1351–1352
- Shaka Samvat: 1216–1217
- Kali Yuga: 4395–4396
- Holocene calendar: 11295
- Igbo calendar: 295–296
- Iranian calendar: 673–674
- Islamic calendar: 694–695
- Japanese calendar: Einin 3 (永仁３年)
- Javanese calendar: 1206–1207
- Julian calendar: 1295; MCCXCV
- Korean calendar: 3628
- Minguo calendar: 617 before ROC 民前617年
- Nanakshahi calendar: −173
- Thai solar calendar: 1837–1838
- Tibetan calendar: ཤིང་ཕོ་རྟ་ལོ་ (male Wood-Horse); 1421 or 1040 or 268 — to — ཤིང་མོ་ལུག་ལོ་ (female Wood-Sheep); 1422 or 1041 or 269

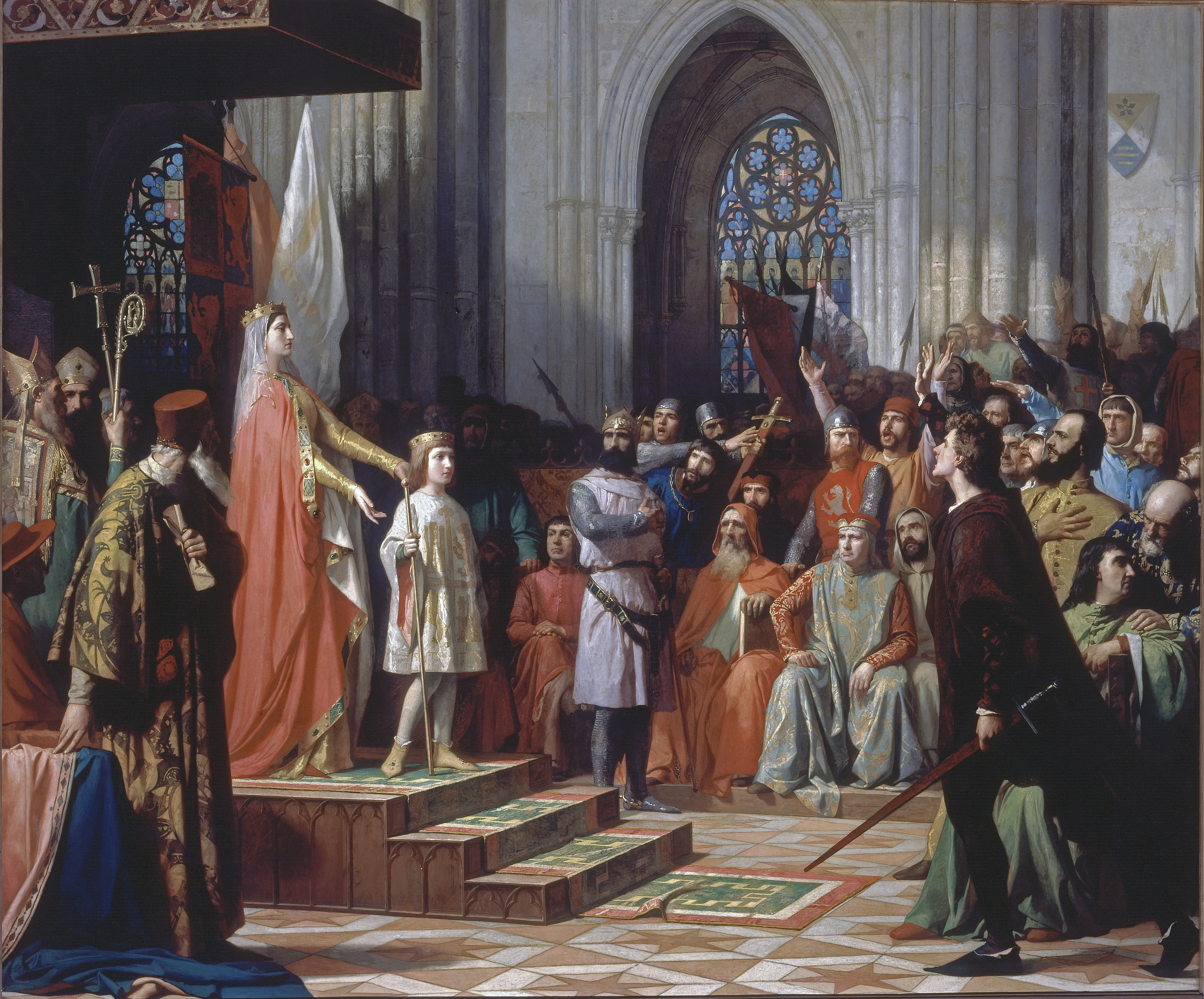
Queen María de Molina shows her son Ferdinand IV of Castile in the Cortes at Valladolid.

Year 1295 (MCCXCV) was a common year starting on Saturday of the Julian calendar.

== Events ==
=== By place ===
==== Europe ====
- April 25 – King Sancho IV of Castile ("the Brave") dies of a fatal illness (possibly tuberculosis), after a 11-year reign at Toledo. He is succeeded by his 9-year-old son Ferdinand IV ("the Summoned") as ruler of Castile and León. In the Cortes at Valladolid, Henry of Castile the Senator is appointed guardian of Ferdinand, while Queen María de Molina becomes his regent. During the summer, Ferdinand is betrothed to the 5-year-old Princess Constance of Portugal. Hostilities between Castile and King Denis of Portugal ("the Poet King") are ended by a peace agreement.
- June 20 – Treaty of Anagni: Pope Boniface VIII arranges a peace treaty between King Philip IV of France ("the Fair"), Charles II of Naples ("the Lame"), and James II of Majorca. James returns Sicily to the Papal States, seeking to bring peace between the Capetian House of Anjou and the Kingdom of Sicily; the effort is in vain. Boniface is determined to put an end to the War of the Sicilian Vespers, because he wants to declare a new Crusade for the reconquest of the Holy Land.
- June 26 – Przemysł II is crowned king of Poland at Gniezno, the first coronation of a Polish ruler in 219 years. Przemysł travels to Pomerelia where he confirms the privileges of the monasteries in Oliwa and Żarnowiec. He also visits other major cities: Gdańsk, Tczew and Świecie. In August, Przemysł returns to Greater Poland but in October he travels again to Gdańsk.
- July 22 – War of Curzola: Genoese raids on the Venetian quarter in Constantinople lead to a formal declaration of war with the Republic of Venice. A Venetian fleet (some 40 war galleys) attacks Galata, the quarter of the Genoese merchants. Emperor Andronikos II Palaiologos arrests surviving Venetians in the capital and joins the war with the Republic of Genoa.
- Marco Polo returns to Venice after 24 years of travel in China. When the Polos arrive, Venice is engaged in a naval war with the rival city of Genoa. Marco joins the war and arms a galley equipped with a trebuchet.
- October 23 – The first treaty forming the Auld Alliance ("Old Alliance"), between Scotland and France against England, is signed in Paris by Kings John Balliol and Philip IV.

==== Britain ====
- March 5 – Battle of Maes Moydog: English forces led by William de Beauchamp, 9th Earl of Warwick defeat the Welsh rebels (some 700 men), near the modern-day town of Llanfair Caereinion in Wales. In a night attack on the Welsh infantry, William uses cavalry to drive them into compact formations, which are then shot up by his archers. Madog ap Llywelyn, proclaimed "Prince of Wales", and the remnants of his army are routed and retreat across the Banwy River, in which many drown.
- November 13 – King Edward I of England ("Longshanks") summons the Model Parliament to Westminster, the composition of which serves as a model for later parliaments. The parliament agrees that a tax can be raised to allow him to launch campaigns against France and the rebellious Scots for the forthcoming year.
- Construction begins on Beaumaris Castle in Anglesey under the direction of James of Saint George as part of the conquest of Wales by Edward I.

==== Asia ====
- October 4 – Mongol leader Baydu Khan is executed after a 7-month reign at Tabriz. He is succeeded by Ghazan, who becomes ruler of the Ilkhanate. He converts to Islam, ending a line of Vajrayana (Tantric Buddhist) leaders.
- King Jayavarman VIII is overthrown after a 52-year reign. He is succeeded by his son-in-law Indravarman III as ruler of the Khmer Empire (modern Cambodia).

== Births ==
some dates approximate

- March 21 – Henry Suso, German priest, mystic and writer (d. 1366)
- September 16 – Elizabeth de Clare, English noblewoman (d. 1360)
- Catherine of Austria, German noblewoman and princess (d. 1323)
- Egill Eyjólfsson, Icelandic deacon, scholar and bishop (d. 1341)
- Giovanni Colonna, Italian cardinal (House of Colonna) (d. 1348)
- Hōjō Moritoki, Japanese nobleman and regent (shikken) (d. 1333)
- Joanna of Flanders, Flemish noblewoman and regent (d. 1374)
- John III, French nobleman and knight (House of Dreux) (d. 1331)
- John of Montfort, French nobleman (House of Montfort) (d. 1345)
- Juan Alfonso de la Cerda, French nobleman and knight (d. 1347)
- Margaret of Valois, French noblewoman and princess (d. 1342)
- Nicephorus Gregoras, Byzantine historian and writer (d. 1360)
- Nijō Tameakira, Japanese nobleman and waka poet (d. 1364)
- Odo IV of Burgundy (or Eudes), French nobleman and knight (d. 1349)
- Reinald II of Guelders ("the Black"), Dutch nobleman and regent (d. 1343)
- Reynold Cobham, English nobleman and diplomat (d. 1361)
- Robert de Eglesfield, English nobleman and chaplain (d. 1349)
- Takatsukasa Fuyunori, Japanese nobleman and regent (d. 1337)
- Vitalis of Assisi, Italian Benedictine monk and hermit (d. 1370)

== Deaths ==
- January 2 – Agnes of Baden, Duchess of Carinthia, German noblewoman (b. 1250)
- January 11 – Bayan of the Baarin, Mongol general (b. 1236)
- March 21 – Gaykhatu, Mongol ruler of the Ilkhanate (b. 1259)
- March 31 – Robert V de Brus, Scottish nobleman (b. 1215)
- April 10 – Baldwin of Avesnes, French nobleman (b. 1219)
- April 25 – Sancho IV ("the Brave"), king of Castile (b. 1258)
- May 28 – Barnim II, Polish nobleman and co-ruler (b. 1277)
- August 1 – Pietro Peregrosso, Italian scholar and cardinal
- August 8 – Ottone Visconti, Italian canon and archbishop
- August 12 – Charles Martel, titular king of Hungary (b. 1271)
- September 15 – Ruggieri degli Ubaldini, Italian archbishop
- October 4 – Baydu, Mongol ruler of the Ilkhanate (b. 1255)
- November 10 – Nicholas Segrave, 1st Baron Segrave, English nobleman (b. 1238)
- December 7 – Gilbert de Clare, 7th Earl of Gloucester, English nobleman (b. 1243)
- December 16 – Roger de Meyland, English sheriff and bishop
- December 20 – Margaret of Provence, queen consort of France (b. 1221)
- Anna of Greater Poland, Polish princess and abbess (b. 1253)
- Beatrice of Navarre, French noblewoman and regent (b. 1242)
- Fenenna of Kuyavia (or Kujawska), queen consort of Hungary (b. 1276)
- Nicholas of Gorran, French preacher and theologian (b. 1232)
- Padishah Khatun, Mongol female ruler and writer (b. 1256)
