= Euphemia of Greater Poland (1253–1298) =

- Born: 1253
- Died: 5 September 1298 (aged 44–45); St. Clara monastery in Wrocław
- Occupations: princess member of the House of Piast and nun at St. Clara in Wrocław
- Parents: Przemysł I (father); Elisabeth of Wrocław (mother)

Euphemia of Greater Poland (Polish: Eufemia wielkopolska) (1253 – 5 September 1298) was a Greater Poland princess member of the House of Piast and nun at St. Clara in Wrocław.

She was the fourth daughter (twin with Anna) of Przemysł I, Duke of Greater Poland and Poznań, by his wife Elisabeth, daughter of Henry II the Pious, Duke of Wrocław. She was named after her paternal aunt Euphemia, wife of Władysław, Duke of Opole. In sources, and like almost all the Piast princesses who bear that name, Euphemia was also called with the diminutive Ofka.

== Life ==
After the death of her father in 1257, Euphemia and her siblings remained under the custody of their mother, and after the mother's death in 1265, they remained under the custody of their paternal uncle Bolesław the Pious. The religious environment under which Euphemia and her unmarried sisters Euphrosyne and Anna (her twin) lived since their early years certainly impacted them: the three took the veil.

Euphemia entered in the St. Clara monastery in Wrocław as a nun. She was the only of the three sisters who never became Abbess of her community: until 1280, the office of Abbess was held by her maternal aunt Hedwig, daughter of Henry II the Pious, and after her resignation, she was replaced with Hedwig, daughter of Konrad I of Głogów, who remained in that position until her death in 1318.

Euphemia died on 5 September 1298. She was buried in the St. Clara monastery in Wrocław.

== Bibliography ==
- K. Jasiński, Genealogia Piastów wielkopolskich. Potomstwo Władysława Odonica, [in:] Kronika Miasta Poznania, vol. II, 1995, p. 52.
- K. Ożóg, Eufemia [in:] Piastowie. Leksykon biograficzny, Wydawnictwo Literackie, Kraków 1999, p. 153.
