= Władysław Odonic =

Duke of Greater Poland (c. 1190–1239)

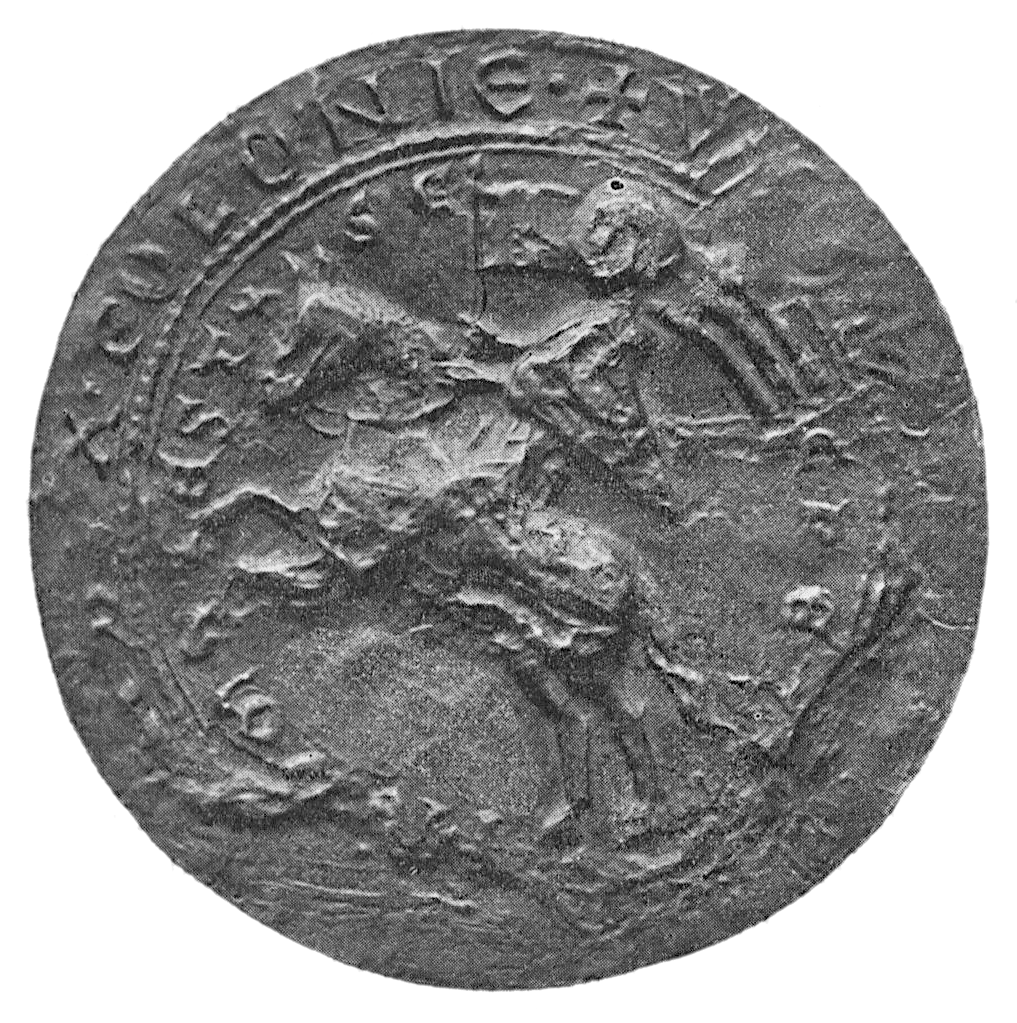
- Władysław Odonic's seal, dated from 1231
- Born: c. 1190
- Died: 5 June 1239
- Buried: Archcathedral Basilica of St. Peter and St. Paul, Poznań
- Noble family: House of Piast
- Spouse: Hedwig
- Issue: Przemysł I Bolesław the Pious; Salomea; Ziemomysł; Euphemia
- Father: Odon of Poznań
- Mother: Viacheslava Yaroslavna of Halych

Władysław Odonic, nicknamed Plwacz or the Spitter, (c. 1190 – 5 June 1239) was a duke of Kalisz 1207–1217, duke of Poznań 1216–1217, ruler of Ujście in 1223, ruler of Nakło from 1225, and duke of all Greater Poland 1229–1234; from 1234 until his death he was ruler over only the north and east of the Warta river (some historians believed that shortly before his death, he lost Ujście and Nakło).

He was the son of Duke Odon of Kalisz by his wife Viacheslava, daughter of Prince Yaroslav Osmomysl of Halych. Władysław was probably named after either his paternal uncle Władysław III Spindleshanks or his ancestor Władysław I Herman.

The nickname "Plwacz" (English: the Spitter) was already given to him in the 13th century chronicles. It is unknown if he received that nickname because of a disease that affected his throat or because he had bad manners. Another nickname used in the contemporary sources was "Odonic", a corruption of his patronymic Odowic ("son of Odon"); it is also unknown why the sources persisted in using the erroneous form instead of the correct one.

== Life ==
=== Early years ===
Duke Odon of Kalisz died on 20 April 1194. Władysław (then only four years old) and his siblings were placed under the care of his paternal uncle Władysław III Spindleshanks (half-brother of Odon), who acted as regent over southern Greater Poland (a duchy created for Odon by his father Mieszko III the Old in 1182). The Duchy of Kalisz itself was directly annexed by Mieszko III to his domains.

=== First War against Władysław III Spindleshanks ===
Mieszko III the Old died in 1202, and Władysław III Spindleshanks inherited the lands of Greater Poland. At some point in the ensuing four years, Władysław III surrendered the Duchy of Kalisz to Henry I the Bearded, Duke of Wrocław, in exchange of Lubusz, part of his effort to become more involved in Pomerania (which bordered Lubusz).

In 1206, Władysław Odonic was declared an adult and began to claim government over his domains. It was especially hard for him to accept the surrender of the Duchy of Kalisz, as the young prince believed it to be part of his rightful heritage. Unable to reach a favorable agreement with his uncle, Władysław Odonic decided to declare open war against Władysław III Spindleshanks. His attempt to overthrow the High Duke was strongly supported by part of the Greater Poland nobility and the Archbishop of Gniezno Henryk Kietlicz, who also wanted to obtain greater independence and benefits for the Church.

=== Duke of Kalisz ===
However, despite the efforts of both Władysław Odonic and Archbishop Kietlicz (who even launched an anathema against Władysław III), the rebellion was short-lived and unsuccessful. Both were banished from the country. Władysław Odonic took refuge in Wrocław in the court of Henry I the Bearded, who, despite his good relations with Władysław III Spindleshanks, decided to fully support the rebel prince. One year later, in 1207, Henry I the Bearded gave to Władysław Odonic the Duchy of Kalisz, but with the condition that in the event he was able to recover the southern Greater Poland lands, Kalisz was to return to Silesia.

=== Congress of Głogów. Attempt to reconcile with Władysław III Spindleshanks ===
Despite these gestures, Henry I the Bearded refused to militarily support Władysław Odonic, as he tried to reconcile both princes through diplomatic channels. In 1208, a meeting was arranged in Głogów, where the Duke of Wrocław and the Bishops of Lubusz and Poznań discovered that the resolution of this situation was to be a difficult task. The meeting ended with a partial success, because Władysław III Spindleshanks reached an agreement with the Archbishop Kietlicz, who could return to Gniezno, with the promise of restitution of all his goods, in exchange for lifting the anathema. However, Władysław Odonic was left with nothing.

=== Close cooperation with the Church ===
In July 1210, the Synod of Borzykowa was organized as a meeting between local bishops and princes, in order to solve the problematic issue of the bull issued by Pope Innocent III, who restored the idea of a unified Seniorate Province under the rule of the eldest Piast. Then, a coalition was formed between Władysław Odonic, Leszek the White (High Duke of Poland since 1206), and Konrad I of Masovia against the politics of Władysław III Spindleshanks and Mieszko I Tanglefoot, Duke of Opole–Racibórz. Also, during the meeting, the privileges obtained by the Polish church at Łęczyca in 1180 were confirmed, including exemption from secular tribunals.

Leszek the White, along with other Piast princes, wanting to ensure the support of the Church, then issued a Great Privilege, which ensured the integrity of the territorial possessions of the Bishops. The privilege was not signed by Henry I the Bearded and Władysław III Spindleshanks, but they later accepted the provisions established there. Mieszko I Tanglefoot was not present in Borzykowa; with the support of the Gryfici family, he decided to lead his army and march against Kraków, where confusion among the citizens left him in total control of the capital without fighting, and he became the new High Duke.

Władysław Odonic's policy of full cooperation with the Church resulted in the issue of a bull by Pope Innocent III on 13 May 1211, in which the Pope declared Władysław to be under his protection. Władysław also actively supported the monastic orders, notably the Cistercians, who received lands in the district of Przemęt on 29 July 1210. On 20 October 1213, a new Cistercian monastery was founded in Ołobok over the Prosna river, which was richly furnished by Władysław.

In 1215 Władysław Odonic took part in the congress of princes and bishops in Wolbórz, where he and the other Piast rulers (including Leszek I the White, Konrad I of Masovia, and Casimir I of Opole) agreed to extend the economic and legal benefits for the Church.

=== Duke of Southern Greater Poland. Conflict with Henry I the Bearded ===
One year later, Archbishop Kietlicz supported the provisions of the IV Lateran Council, wherein papal authority was reinforced and the Fifth Crusade was organized. Also, with the support of the other Polish princes, the Archbishop promoted the surrender of the southern Greater Poland lands to Władysław. Finally, in 1216, Władysław III Spindleshanks gave his nephew the rule over southern Greater Poland.

However, the receipt of these lands near Obra River created a new problem for Władysław. In accordance with the treaty of 1206 between him and Henry I the Bearded, the Duchy of Kalisz had to return to Silesia if Władysław recovered his heritage. In addition, the previous excellent relations with Archbishop Kietlicz also began to deteriorate, and so Władysław managed to get a new protective bull from the Pope (issued on 9 February 1217), this time to protect him against the claims of the local Church hierarchy.

In 1217, a congress of other Piast dukes in Danków proved to be very detrimental to Władysław Odonic. There, his uncle Władysław III Spindleshanks and Leszek the White signed an agreement of mutual succession, which considerably reduced the chances of the young prince to acquire, by peaceful means, his uncle's inheritance.

=== Second War against Władysław III Spindleshanks. Escape from the country ===
The agreement at Danków (which Henry I the Bearded soon joined) and the death of Archbishop Kietlicz enabled Władysław III Spindleshanks to attack his nephew with the benevolent neutrality of the other Piast rulers. Władysław Odonic was unable to defend himself or his lands, and shortly thereafter, he escaped to Hungary.

Almost nothing is known about the first phase of Władysław's exile from Poland. There are some assumptions that the prince attended the expedition of King Andrew II of Hungary to Palestine. Subsequently, he probably went to Bohemia and Germany, where he tried to encourage the help of local rulers.

=== Arrival in Pomerania. Conquest of Ujście and Nakło ===
In 1218 Władysław Odonic finally arrived to the court of Świętopełk II of Pomerania (probably his brother-in-law), who wanted his own political emancipation and broke his homage to Leszek the White. Świętopełk II promised Władysław his support in the effort to reconquer his heritage.

Thanks to the help of the Pomeranian Duke, Władysław was able to capture the north-eastern fortress of Ujście in 1223. Two years later, he was able to repel the counter-attack of his uncle and obtain the district of Nakło.

=== New phase in the War against Władysław III Spindleshanks. Defeat of voivode Dobrogost ===
In 1227, Władysław III Spindleshanks finally decided to attack his nephew directly. For this purpose, he sent troops under the command of Voivode Dobrogost, who besieged Ujście. Not only did the voivode fail to conquer the strongly fortified city, but Władysław Odonic made a surprise attack on Dobrogost's troops and on 15 July, the voivode's army was completely defeated and he was killed. Thanks to this victory, Władysław Odonic was able to take most of Greater Poland.

=== The Congress of Gąsawa and its tragic consequences. Responsibility for Leszek the White's death ===
Afraid that he could lose all of his domains, Władysław III Spindleshanks decided to find a peaceful solution to the dispute with his nephew. For this purpose, a solemn convention of the Piast princes, bishops, and nobles was convened in the Kuyavian district of Gąsawa in November 1227. Among the princes who attended the meeting were Władysław Odonic, Leszek the White, Henry I the Bearded, and Konrad I of Masovia. For unknown reasons, Władysław III Spindleshanks ultimately chose not to appear at the congress, perhaps because his interests were probably represented by Paul, Bishop of Poznań. In addition, the dukes were also to discuss proposals for a solution to the usurpation of the ducal title by Świętopełk II of Pomerania, who used the confusion in Greater Poland to seize Nakło, which belonged to Władysław).

The tragic end of the meeting took place on the morning of 24 November, when, during a break from the deliberations, the princes were attacked by Pomeranians, who killed Leszek the White and seriously injured Henry I the Bearded. By sources and historiography, the main culprit for the murder was Władysław Odonic, although there are some historians who believe that Duke Świętopełk II was also involved in the crime, and some who are inclined to absolve Władysław Odonic from any part in the attack.

=== Friendly relations with Konrad I of Masovia. New struggles with Władysław III Spindleshanks ===
The events of Gąsawa led to a very complicated situation in Poland and brought few benefits to Władysław Odonic in his conflict with his uncle. At the beginning of 1228, Władysław III Spindleshanks, with the help of Silesian forces, managed to defeat his nephew under unknown circumstances, taking him prisoner. However, the Duke of Greater Poland failed to take advantage of this success because later that year, while his uncle was in Lesser Poland, Władysław Odonic managed to escape to Płock, where he established friendly relations with Konrad I of Masovia.

=== Deposition of Władysław III Spindleshanks from Greater Poland and his death ===
In 1229, Władysław Odonic and Konrad I of Masovia took a concerted action against Władysław III Spindleshanks. Władysław Odonic then managed to control his uncle's domains. Much less successful was the participation of Konrad I, whose troops unsuccessfully besieged Kalisz. Władysław III Spindleshanks ultimately could not defend himself and soon after he escaped to Racibórz in Silesia. Władysław Odonic's success was complete, but a risk still remained: in the spring of 1231, Henry I the Bearded launched an expedition against Greater Poland with the purpose of restoring Władysław III Spindleshanks, but the Silesian troops were defeated at the walls of Gniezno.

On 3 November 1231, Władysław III Spindleshanks died unexpectedly, apparently killed by a German girl whom he tried to rape. However, this only changed Władysław Odonic's situation slightly, as his uncle had passed all his rights of inheritance to Henry I the Bearded before his death.

=== Policy of cooperation with the Church. Rebellion of the local nobility ===
Desiring to neutralize the influence of Silesia, Władysław began a policy to be closer to the Church. In 1232, he granted the Bishop of Poznań an immunity privilege under which all subjects on the Bishop's lands were excluded from homage to the Duchy. Bishop Paul was also allowed to mint his own coin.

However, this policy of submission to the church brought a negative effect among the nobility, who in 1233 rebelled against him and offered the Duchy of Greater Poland to Henry I the Bearded. Thanks to the passivity of Henry I, the revolt failed. Henry I's indifference to Greater Poland was extremely beneficial for Władysław Odonic, who obtained from the Silesian Duke the formal resignation from all his claims over the inheritance of Władysław III Spindleshanks.

The establishment of peace enabled Władysław Odonic and Henry (Henry I's son and heir) to participate jointly with Konrad I of Masovia in the expedition organized by the Teutonic Knights against the Prussians during 1233–1234.

=== War against Henry I the Bearded. Loss of half of Greater Poland ===
In 1234, their recently concluded peace was suddenly broken, and hostilities between Henry I the Bearded and Władysław Odonic were renewed. This time, the Silesian Duke was well prepared, and without major obstacles, he seized the southern part of Greater Poland. Władysław was then forced to enter into peace talks with the mediation of Bishop Paul of Poznań and Archbishop Pełka of Gniezno. The terms of the agreement, published on 22 September 1234, were very unfavorable for Władysław Odonic, who had to relinquish all the territories south and west of the Warta River, which included Kalisz, Santok, Międzyrzecz, and Śrem. In gratitude for his mediation, Władysław extended to Archbishop Pełka and the Bishopric of Gniezno the immunity that he gave to the Poznań church in 1232. Even with the ratification of this (unfavorable) agreement on 26 June 1235, both sides seemed aware that the outbreak of a new war would be just a matter of time.

=== Second Part of the War against Henry I the Bearded ===
The war broke out again by the end of 1235, when Władysław Odonic (using the unrest caused by the brutal government in Śrem of the Governor appointed by Henry I the Bearded, Prince Borzivoj of Bohemia), deceitfully tried to recover that part of Greater Poland. The expedition ended with some success (Śrem was recovered and Borzivoj killed during the battle); however, a retaliatory expedition of the Silesian army soon arrived at Gniezno.

Władysław Odonic, having good relations with the Church, began efforts with Pope Gregory IX for the annulment of the 1234 treaty and Henry I's decision to remove him from Greater Poland by force. In 1236, the Pope ordered Archbishop Pełka to create a committee that would resolve the dispute once and for all. Their decision was favorable to Henry, and after protests by Władysław, another committee produced a document invalidating the treaty of 1234, which in turn was repudiated by Henry I.

In 1237, the hostilities were resumed. As a result, Władysław lost the castellanie of Ladzka. Only after the intervention of a Papal envoy, William of Modena, did both sides agree to a truce.

=== Relations with Henry II the Pious - Death ===
The death of Henry I the Bearded on 19 March 1238 did not end the conflict with the Silesian princes because Henry I's son and successor, Henry II the Pious, maintained his pretensions over Greater Poland. In 1239, a new war broke out and once again, Władysław was defeated. This time, he lost the rest of Greater Poland, with the exception of Ujście and Nakło. (Note: However, later historians like Kasimir Jasiński and Krzysztof Ożóg refute this development, believing that Władysław lost Ujście and Nakło in the war of 1239, but remained in Gniezno and Poznań until his death.)

Władysław Odonic died on 5 June 1239 and was buried in the Archcathedral Basilica of St. Peter and St. Paul, Poznań.

== Marriage and issue ==
Between 1218/1220, Władysław married Hedwig (d. 29 December 1249), whose origins are disputed among historians and sources. According to some sources, her parentage is unknown; however, other historians believed that she had a Pomeranian or Moravian origin: she could be the daughter of Duke Mestwin I of Pomerania, and thus be the sister of Świętopełk II, or she could be a member of the Přemyslid dynasty. They reportedly had six children:

1. Hedwig (b. 1218/1220 – d. 8 January aft. 1234), married ca. 1233 to Duke Casimir I of Kuyavia;
2. Przemysł I (b. 5 June 1220/4 June 1221 – d. 4 June 1257);
3. Bolesław the Pious (b. 1224/1227 – d. 14 April 1279);
4. Salomea (b. ca. 1225 – d. April 1267?) married in 1249 to Duke Konrad I of Głogów;
5. Ziemomysł (b. 1228/1232 – d. 1235/1236);
6. Euphemia (b. ca. 1230 – d. 15 February aft. 1281), married in 1251 to Duke Władysław of Opole.

== See also ==
- Dukes of Greater Poland
- Piast dynasty

== Notes ==
Władysław Odonic Piast Dynasty Born: ca. 1190 Died: 5 June 1239
| Preceded by Henry I the Bearded | Duke of Kalisz; 1207 – 1217 | Succeeded by Władysław III Spindleshanks |
| Preceded by Władysław III Spindleshanks | Duke of Poznań; 1216 – 1217 | Succeeded by Władysław III Spindleshanks |
| Preceded by Władysław III Spindleshanks | Duke of Greater Poland (since 1234 only in the Northern part); 1229 – 1239 | Succeeded by Przemysł I and Bolesław the Pious |
| Preceded by Władysław III Spindleshanks | Duke of Poznań; 1229 – 1234 | Succeeded by Henry I the Bearded |
| Preceded by Władysław III Spindleshanks | Duke of Kalisz; 1229 – 1234 | Succeeded by Henry I the Bearded |
| Preceded by Władysław III Spindleshanks | Duke of Gniezno; 1229 – 1239 | Succeeded by Przemysł I and Bolesław the Pious |
