= Constance of Greater Poland =

- Born: 1245/46
- Died: 8 October 1281
- Burial: Cistercian monastery in Chorin
- Spouse: Conrad I
- Issue: John IV; Otto VII; Waldemar; Agnes
- House: House of Piast
- Father: Przemysł I
- Mother: Elisabeth of Wrocław

Constance of Greater Poland (also known as of Poznań) (Polish: Konstancja wielkopolska (poznańska)) (1245/46 – 8 October 1281) was a princess of Greater Poland, a member of the House of Piast, and by marriage a Margravine of Brandenburg–Stendal.

She was the eldest daughter of Przemysł I, Duke of Greater Poland and Poznań, by his wife Elisabeth, daughter of Henry II the Pious, Duke of Wrocław. She was probably named after her maternal aunt Constance, second wife of Casimir I, Duke of Kuyavia.

== Life ==
In 1255 Constance was engaged to Conrad, son of John I, Margrave of Brandenburg. On 19 December of that year, Pope Alexander IV gave her a dispensation to celebrate the marriage, which was necessary because both Constance and Conrad were great-great-grandchildren of Mieszko III the Old (Constance through Mieszko III's son Odon and Conrad through Mieszko III's daughter Elisabeth). With this alliance, Duke Przemysł I and his brother Bolesław the Pious wanted to establish warmer relations with expanding Brandenburg, which became dangerous to the Greater Poland Dukes during the 1250s.

The formal marriage between Constance and Conrad took place in the border town of Santok in 1260, after the death of Przemysł I. Constance's dowry was the castellany of Santok, though without the main city, which remained in Greater Poland, given to the Margraviate of Brandenburg with the consent of a wiec reunited in Greater Poland, which took place on 1 July of that year in Poznań. The castellany guaranteed the amount promised by Przemysł I as a dowry for his daughter in 1255.

During her marriage, Constance bore her husband four children, three sons (John IV, Otto VII and Waldemar) and a daughter (Agnes, later wife of Albert I, Prince of Anhalt-Zerbst).

The marriage between Constance and Conrad did not bring the expected peace between the Brandenburg and Greater Poland rulers: by 1265, they were fighting for the possession of Santok after Brandenburg occupied the main city. The war was fought intermittently and ended only in 1278, when Greater Poland recovered all of its lost domains.

Margrave John I died on 4 April 1266. Brandenburg was then divided into two parts: one held by John I's brother and co-ruler Otto III (who survived him for only one year), called Brandenburg-Salzwedel, and the other ruled by John I's sons (including Conrad), named Brandenburg-Stendal. Because they all jointly used the title of Margrave, Constance became Margravine consort of Brandenburg-Stendal after her husband became co-ruler of Brandenburg-Stendal.

Constance died on 8 October 1281 and was buried in the Cistercian monastery in Chorin. Her husband never remarried and died in 1304; Constance's only descendants were from her daughter Agnes, Princess of Anhalt-Zerbst: through her, she was one of the ancestors of Catherine II the Great of Russia.
