= Krzysztof Ulatowski =

Polish footballer

Personal information
- Full name: Krzysztof Ulatowski
- Date of birth: 25 July 1980 (age 46)
- Place of birth: Trzebnica, Poland
- Height: 1.73 m (5 ft 8 in)
- Positions: Midfielder; striker

Team information
- Current team: Parasol Wrocław
- Number: 14

Youth career
- Orkan Ligota Piękna
- Parasol Wrocław

Senior career*
Years	Team	Apps	(Gls)
1999–2000	Polonia Trzebnica		
2000–2002	Inkopax Wrocław		
2002–2003	Śląsk Wrocław	29	(11)
2003	Zagłębie Lubin	10	(1)
2004–2011	Śląsk Wrocław	174	(26)
2011–2012	MKS Kluczbork	45	(2)
2012–2015	Chrobry Głogów	76	(0)
2015	GKS Kobierzyce		
2015–2019	Polonia Trzebnica		
2019–2021	Bór Oborniki Śląskie	33	(14)
2021–2022	Pogoń Miękinia	20	(3)
2022–	Parasol Wrocław	36	(1)
- * Club domestic league appearances and goals as of 25 July 2024

Krzysztof Ulatowski (born 25 July 1980) is a Polish footballer who plays as a midfielder for Parasol Wrocław.

== Career ==
In his youth, Ulatowski played for Orkan Ligota Piękna and Parasol Wrocław. Then he moved to his first senior club Polonia Trzebnica. Next he played for Inkopax Wrocław. In 2002, he moved to Śląsk Wrocław. In 2003-2004 he played in Zagłębie Lubin. In 2004, he moved to Śląsk Wrocław. In January 2011, he was loaned to MKS Kluczbork.

== Honours ==
Śląsk Wrocław

- Ekstraklasa Cup: 2008–09

Polonia Trzebnica

- Regional league Wrocław: 2016–17

Pogoń Miękinia

- Klasa A Wrocław I: 2021–22
