= Anna of Greater Poland =

Anna of Greater Poland (Polish: Anna wielkopolska; b. 1253 – d. aft. 26 June 1295), was a Greater Poland princess member of the House of Piast and abbess at Owińska.

She was the third daughter (twin with Euphemia) of Przemysł I, Duke of Greater Poland and Poznań, by his wife Elisabeth, daughter of Henry II the Pious, Duke of Wrocław. She was named after her maternal grandmother, Anna of Bohemia.

== Life ==
Duke Przemysł I died in 1257, leaving four minor daughters and a five months pregnant wife. Anna and her siblings were raised by their mother, and after her death in 1265, their paternal uncle Bolesław the Pious took their guardianship. She was raised in a religious environment, which certainly took a great impact in her life: her mother Elisabeth spent her childhood in the monastery of Trzebnica, where she was strongly influenced by her grandmother, the later St. Hedwig of Andechs; in addition, she grew up in the court of her uncle Duke Bolesław and his wife, Jolenta of Hungary, who are deeply devoted.

Before 1280 entered in the Cistercian monastery in Owińska as a nun. During the 1290s (certainly before 1298), she served as an abbess in her community.

It's unknown the exact date of Anna's death. Certainly she died after the coronation of his brother Przemysł II as King of Poland on 26 June 1295, because the Obituary of Lubiąż mentions Anna and her sister Eufrozynie as the sisters of the Polish King. Probably the day of her death was on 19 May, because on that day a mass was offered for the repose of her soul in the monastery of Lubiaz. She was buried in the monastery in Owińska.
