= Santok =

- Village
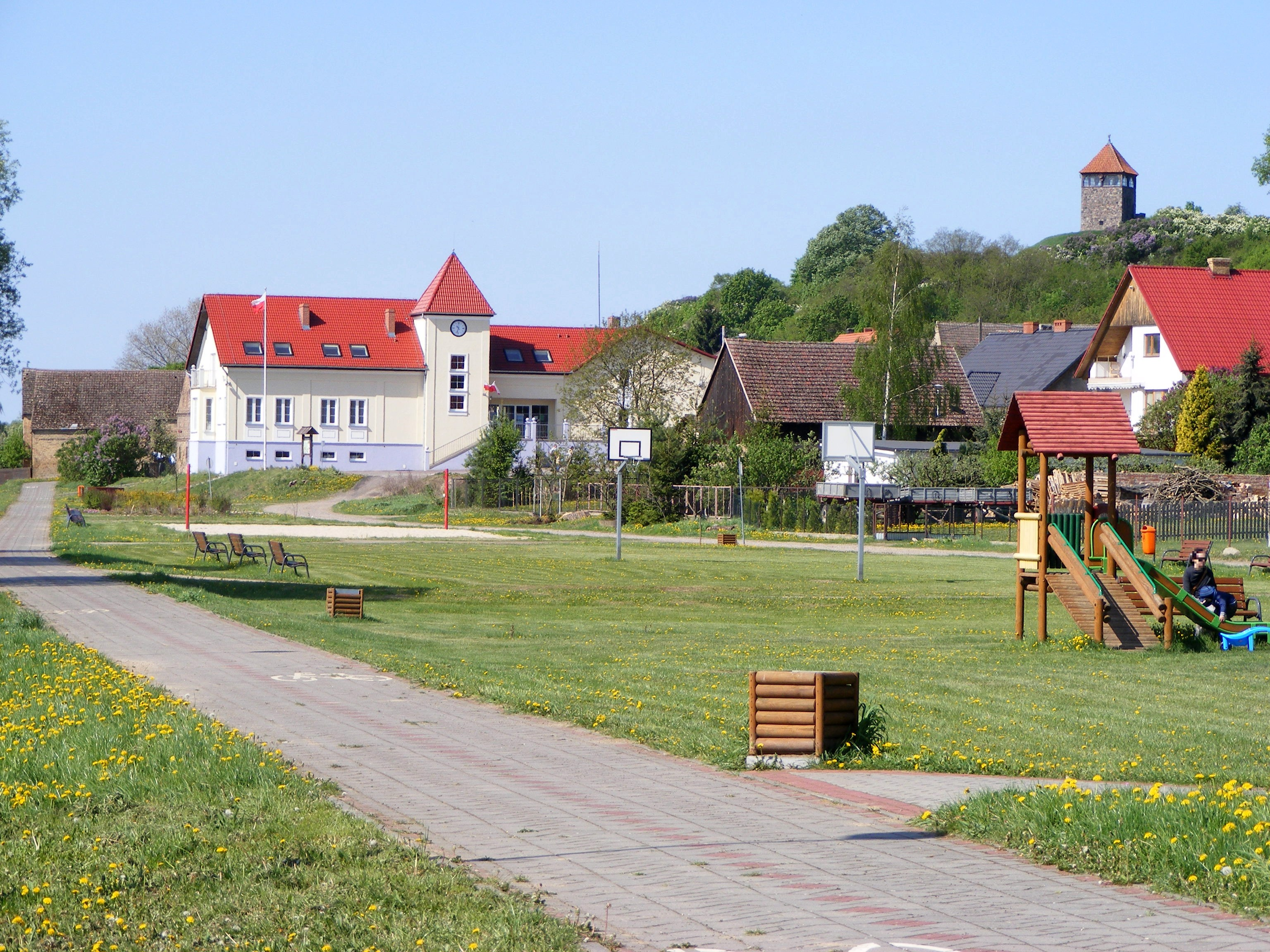
- Town Hall and watchtower

- Coat of arms

- Location within Poland
- Coordinates: 52°44′N 15°25′E
- Country: Poland
- Voivodeship: Lubusz
- County: Gorzów
- Gmina: Santok
- Area: 168.3 km^{2} (65.0 sq mi)
- Population (2006): 780
  - Density: 4.6/km^{2} (12/sq mi)
- Time zone: UTC+1 (CET)
  - Summer (DST): UTC+2 (CEST)
- Postal Code: 66-431
- Area Code: (+48) 95
- Vehicle registration: FGW
- Website: www.santok.pl

Santok [ˈsantɔk] (German: Zantoch) is a village in Gorzów County, Lubusz Voivodeship, in western Poland. It is the seat of the gmina (administrative district) called Gmina Santok.

== Geography ==
Santok is located at the confluence of the Noteć and Warta rivers.

Contemporary Santok is a large village street, over 3 km (2 mi) long. The village is situated at the mouth of Noteć to Warta, on a narrow terrace Pradolina Toruńsko-Eberswaldzka. From the south it is limited by the Warta and Noteć beds, and from the north by the high edge of the Gorzowska Plain.

On the left bank of the Warta, settlements have been preserved, which are now a small wooded hill among wet meadows. Originally, they were located in the fork of Warta and Noteć, but during a catastrophic flood in 1751, Warta changed its channel, creating a new one to the north of the settlement. Archaeological research confirmed the existence of 12 settlement layers in this area, dating from the 8th to 14th centuries.

== History ==
A first fortified settlement at the site was founded in the late 7th century. Santok is mentioned in the 12th century as "barbican and key" (Latin: clavem et terris custodiam) to the Polish kingdom at the border with the Duchy of Pomerania in the Gesta principum Polonorum chronicle by Gallus Anonymus.

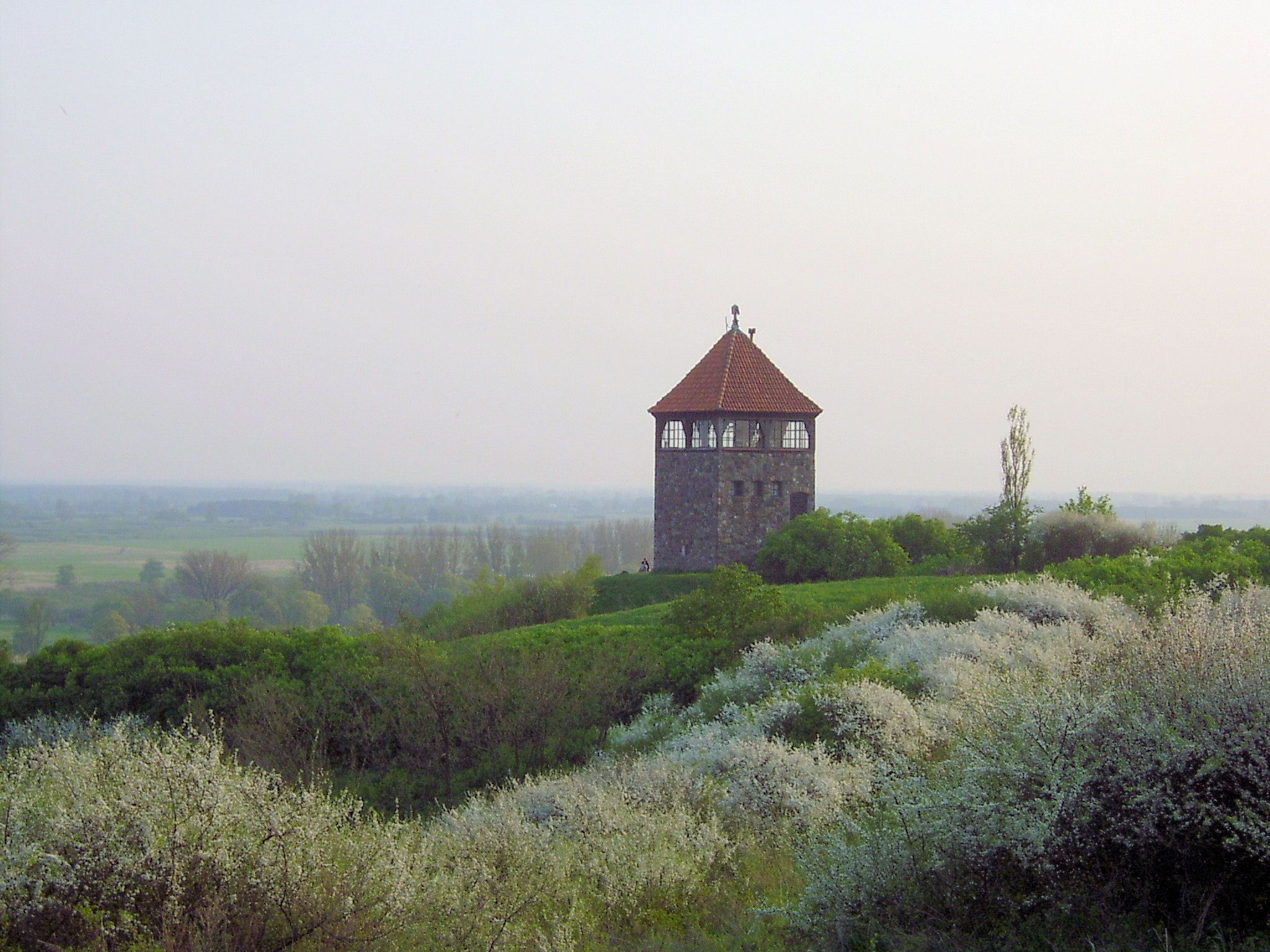
Santok watchtower, 1936 reconstruction

Re-established by Bolesław I the Brave in the days of the medieval Piast dynasty, Santok became an important border fortress of Greater Poland and seat of a castellany. An attack by Duke Barnim I of Pomerania in 1251 was repelled. During the 13th century however, the strategically important hill fort became the object of claims raised by the Ascanian margraves of Brandenburg, who intended to enlarge their territories in the Neumark region east of the Oder river. Upon the marriage of Margrave Conrad of Brandenburg-Stendal with Constance, daughter of the deceased Duke Przemysł I of Greater Poland, in 1260, Santok passed to the margraviate as part of her dowry. Once again reconquered by the Polish duke Przemysł II, it finally was incorporated by Brandenburg upon his death in 1296.

The Polish king Casimir III the Great temporarily recaptured Santok from 1365; still after his death in 1370, the title of a castellan was awarded by the Polish monarchs until the late 18th century. Within the Brandenburg Neumark region, the fortress lost its importance in favour of nearby Landsberg (Gorzów Wielkopolski). In 1402, an agreement was reached between Poland and the Luxembourgs, according to which Poland was to buy and re-incorporate Santok and the surrounding region, but eventually the Luxembourgs sold it to the Teutonic Order. It was devastated by Hussite troops in the course of the Polish–Teutonic War in 1433.

In the 18th century, Santok consisted of two ownership shares. One part belonged to the property complex of Frederick Henry, Margrave of Brandenburg-Schwedt and the remainder was owned by the Schöning noble family. During the Seven Years' War, Santok was plundered and destroyed by Russian troops in 1758.

From 1815, the town belonged to the district of Landsberg in Regierungsbezirk Frankfurt of the Province of Brandenburg in Prussia and since 1871 also Germany. Towards the end of World War II, it was occupied by the Red Army on 20 January 1945. Shortly thereafter, with the implementation of the Oder-Neisse line, Santok again became part of Poland, amid the extensive territorial changes of Poland after World War II. In the following years, the German population was expelled in accordance with the Potsdam Agreement.
