= Jadwiga (wife of Władysław Odonic) =

Jadwiga (died 29 December 1249) was by marriage Duchess consort of Greater Poland.

Her parentage is disputed among historians and sources. Among the possible origins for Jadwiga include:

- Descent from the Pomerelian Samborides lineage of the Dukes of Pomerania, i.e. the daughter of Mestwin I, Duke of Pomerania. This theory is the most accepted among historiography and web sources.
- Descent from the Bohemian Přemyslid dynasty, i.e. the daughter of Prince Sviatopluk, son of Vladislaus II, Duke and King of Bohemia.
- Descent from the German House of Andechs. This origin is supported by the fact that she is called relative of the Grand Master of the Teutonic Knights, Poppo von Osterna.

== Life ==
After Władysław Odonic was expelled from Poland by his uncle Władysław III Spindleshanks, he spent some time in Hungary, Bohemia and Germany before he arrived to the court of Swantopolk II, Duke of Pomerania around 1218. In Pomerania the wedding between Władysław and Jadwiga took place (ca. 1218–1220), an act that reaffirmed the close blood relationship between Jadwiga and the Pomeranian ruler. With the support of Swantopolk II, Władysław began the conquest of Greater Poland, which he completed in 1229.

During her marriage, Jadwiga bore her husband at least four children, two sons —Przemysł I and Bolesław— and two daughters —Salomea (Duchess of Głogów) and Euphemia (Duchess of Opole). Sources also include a short-lived son, Ziemomysł, and a daughter, Jadwiga, first wife of Duke Casimir I of Kuyavia.

Władysław Odonic died on 5 June 1239. Jadwiga survived him for another ten years before she died herself. She is buried at Gniezno Cathedral in Poland.
