= Bolesław the Pious =

Duke of Greater Poland from 1239 to 1247

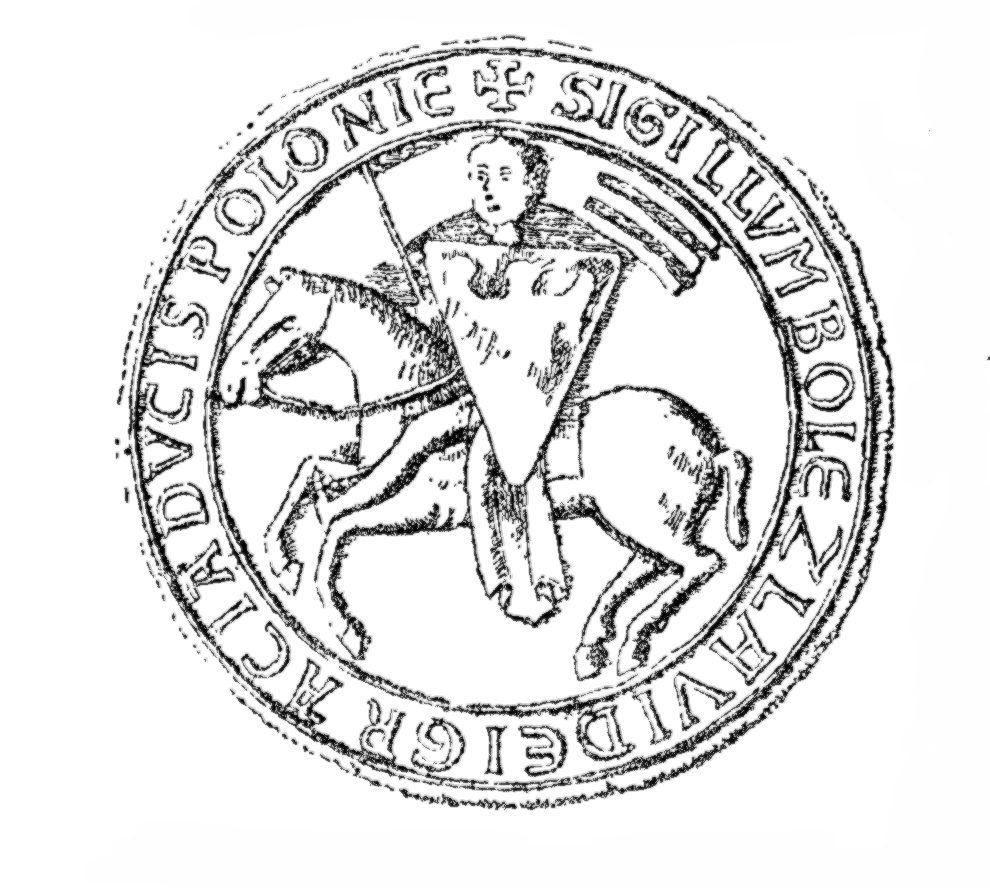
- Seal of Bolesław the Pious, 1258
- Born: between 1224 and 1227
- Died: 14 April 1279; Kalisz
- Buried: Archcathedral Basilica of St. Peter and St. Paul, Poznań
- Noble family: House of Piast
- Spouse: Jolenta of Poland
- Issue: Elisabeth; Jadwiga; Anna
- Father: Władysław Odonic
- Mother: Jadwiga

Bolesław the Pious (1224/27 – 14 April 1279) was a Duke of Greater Poland during 1239–1247 (according to some historians during 1239–1241, sole Duke of Ujście), Duke of Kalisz during 1247–1249, Duke of Gniezno during 1249–1250, Duke of Gniezno-Kalisz during 1253–1257, Duke of the whole of Greater Poland and Poznań during 1257–1273, in 1261 ruler over Ląd, regent of the Duchies of Mazovia, Płock and Czersk during 1262–1264, ruler over Bydgoszcz during 1268–1273, Duke of Inowrocław during 1271–1273, and Duke of Gniezno-Kalisz from 1273 until his death.

He was the second son of Władysław Odonic, Duke of Greater Poland by his wife Jadwiga, who was probably the daughter of Mestwin I, Duke of Pomerania, or a member of the Přemyslid dynasty. His name was very popular in the Piast dynasty, so it is unknown exactly after whom he was named. Very soon Bolesław received the nickname of "the Pious" (Latin: Pius, Polish: Pobożny), given to him during his lifetime by the Chronicle of the Chapter of Poznań. In 1264, Bolesław granted the first written privilege to the Jews of Greater Poland.

== Early years ==
The first years of Bolesław saw him share the fierce dispute of his father against Władysław III Spindleshanks (his own uncle) for his inheritance. However, Władysław Odonic took care properly for the upbringing of his offspring, evidenced by the fact that Bolesław, like his older brother Przemysł I, was able to read and write Latin.

== Guardianship of Przemysł I ==
Because Bolesław was a minor when Władysław Odonic died on 5 June 1239, his elder brother Przemysł I ruled alone at first. Historians agree the territory the brothers inherited started out small, but disagree as to whether it extended beyond Ujście and Nakło in northern Poland. In 1241, Przemysł and Boleslaw began reclaiming the lands their father had lost. By 1243 the brothers regained most of the Duchies of Poznań and Gniezno, in 1244 Kalisz, in 1247 Santok, and in 1249 Wieluń. In 1244, Bolesław supported his brother in a conflict between the local nobility and the clergy led by the Bishop of Poznań Bogufał II for the privileges their father had granted shortly before his death. On 24 April 1245 Przemysł I acknowledged Boleslaw's coming of age by knighting him during a solemn Mass in honor of St. Adalbert of Prague in Gniezno, celebrated by Archbishop Pełka Liz.

The indivisibility of the Duchy was not to Bolesław's liking, and in 1247 he persuaded his brother Przemysł I to provide territory for his sole leadership: the land between the Prosna River and Przemęt, north of the Warta River and thence to the Odra River; in short it was the Duchy of Kalisz. This division, though rather unjust for Bolesław, was approved by the Church, and after he protested, he was threatened with the excommunication. Despite the fact that he now had his own district, Bolesław did not pursue a foreign policy; this would continue to be the responsibility of his brother. This was revealed during the dispute with Duke Casimir I of Kuyavia regarding the possession of Ladzka, which was given to him by Henry II the Pious as a dowry for his daughter Constance, Casimir I's second wife. This decision was not recognized by Władysław Odonic's sons, but eventually they reconciled and even signed an alliance with the Kuyavian Duke, which effectively ended any attempt to change the ownership of the disputed land.

In 1249 Bolesław, dissatisfied with the tutelage of his older brother, persuaded him to make a new division of their patrimony. He received the Duchies of Kalisz and Gniezno, with the addition of Wieluń, which had recently been returned to the rule of Władysław Odonic's sons. This new division was apparently made peacefully, because later in that same year the brothers together gave support to Konrad I of Głogów against his brother Bolesław II the Bald. However, on 19 May 1250 an unexplained event took place, which was related in the Chronicle of Greater Poland:

Przemysł captured his brother Bolesław and took all his lands and castles.

The conflict certainly was not trivial, since Bolesław did not regain his freedom until 20 April 1253, thanks to the pressures of the powerful Greater Poland clergy. The final reconciliation between the brothers occurred in May of that year at a meeting in Pogorzelica near Giecz, where thanks to the mediation of Pełka, the Archbishop of Gniezno Bolesław recovered his Duchy of Kalisz-Gniezno. After that the brothers cooperated without problems, but Bolesław was still removed from the foreign policy of Greater Poland. On 8 May 1254, Bolesław took part in the national Congress of Piast princes at Kraków on the occasion of the canonization of St. Stanislaus, where they decided to form a coalition against Swantopolk II, Duke of Pomerania. Among the princes who participated were his brother Przemysł I, Casimir I of Kuyavia, Siemowit I of Masovia, Władysław of Opole and Bolesław V the Chaste. In September of that year Bolesław participated in an expedition against Henry III the White launched by his brother and Konrad I of Głogów.

== Sole rulership ==
=== Foreign policy ===
On 4 June 1257 Przemysł I died, aged only 36. With his brother's death, new horizons opened to Bolesław. He became in the undisputed sole ruler over the whole of Greater Poland. Although the posthumous son of his brother, Przemysł II, was born on 14 October of that year, Boleslaw was his guardian until he was declared an adult. The first of Bolesław's new foreign politics was his marriage in 1258 to Princess Jolenta (Helena), daughter of King Béla IV of Hungary. This union resulted in a permanent bond between Bolesław and Hungary, reflected in the assistance given in the conflict with Bohemia after the extinction of the House of Babenberg. For Bolesław, this alliance cost him the devastation of Greater Poland during the winter of 1267–1268 by troops of King Ottokar II of Bohemia during his return from an expedition against the Prussians. One of the stages of this war was also the trip taken by Bolesław together with Bolesław V the Chaste and Leszek II the Black in the autumn of 1273 in order to visit Władysław of Opole, an ally of the Přemyslid dynasty.

=== Relations with Masovia and Kuyavia ===
During 1258-1261 Bolesław was involved in a long and destructive war against Casimir I of Kuyavia and his ally Swantopolk II for the castellanie of Ladzka. To this end, the Greater Poland Duke allied with Wartislaw III, Duke of Pomerania-Demmin, Siemowit I of Masovia, Bolesław V the Chaste and Roman Danylovich, Prince of Navahradak. The war ended in a full victory and Ladzka returned to Greater Poland. The formal treaty was signed on 29 November 1259; however, Casimir I delayed in fulfilled the provisions of the agreement, which led in 1261 to a new military expedition.

On 23 June 1262 Siemowit I was killed at the hands of the Lithuanian troops and his eldest son Konrad II was taken prisoner. Both Konrad II and his younger brother Bolesław II were minors at that time; for this reason, Bolesław became regent of their domains (Duchies of Masovia, Płock and Czersk) for the next two years, until 1264, when Konrad II obtain his freedom and return to Masovia.

In 1268 Bolesław interfered again in the Kuyavian affairs. Casimir I's son, Duke Ziemomysł of Inowrocław, followed a policy of close contacts with the Teutonic Order and Duke Sambor II of Pomerania, who became in his father-in-law. This caused a deep dissatisfaction among the local nobility, who called on Bolesław for help. The Duke of Greater Poland quickly took Radziejów, Kruszwica and the castle in Bydgoszcz; however, rapid action by Ziemomysł regained temporary control of this lands.

Despite this success, Ziemomysł continued with his German-Pomeranian politics, which caused a new revolt by his subjects, who called again Bolesław for help: in 1271 he invaded the Duchy of Inowrocław and forced Ziemomysł to flee. Bolesław retained the Duchy until 1273, when he gave it to Ziemomysł's brother Leszek II the Black, except for Radziejów and Kruszwica, which remained in Greater Poland.

=== War against Brandenburg ===
From the beginning of his sole rule, Bolesław established contacts with the Margraviate of Brandenburg, ruled by the House of Ascania; in this, he followed the policy of his brother Przemysł I, who even betrothed his eldest daughter Constance with Conrad, son of Margrave John I. Three years after Przemysł I's death (in 1260), Constance and Conrad were formally married. As a dowry, Brandenburg received the castellany of Santok (but without the important main city) with the consent of a wiec reunited in Greater Poland, which took place on 1 July 1260 in Poznań.

However, the expected peace due to this marriage was short-lived. In early 1265 Brandenburg occupied the main city of Santok and broke the previous agreement. Thanks to an immediate diplomatic intervention, Bolesław soon signed a new treaty with Brandenburg, under which Greater Poland burned the fortress built in Drezdenko, and Brandenburg also burned his fortress in Santok. But in 1269 war with Brandenburg erupted again. They built a fortress in Sulęcin, and in response Bolesław did the same thing in Międzyrzecz. The invasion of Międzyrzecz launched by the Margraves of Brandenburg was successfully repulsed by Bolesław, who in December 1269 could advance to Lubusz and in addition, during this expedition burned several fortresses, included the one newly built in Sulęcin. Both sides made a new agreement and were restored the fortress in Santok (from Brandenburg) and Drezdenko (from Greater Poland). The latter was captured by Brandenburg in 1270. For this reason, in the spring of 1271 Bolesław organized a major military expedition against Santok and Neumark, ravaging this land terribly, but he could not recover the lost domains.

The war with the House of Ascania wasn't limited to the border areas of Greater Poland. By 1272 Bolesław entered in an alliance with Mestwin II, Duke of Pomerania-Gdańsk; one year later (in 1273), he renewed his homage to Brandenburg and promised his help to the Margraviate against all his enemies, except the Duke of Greater Poland. In the same year was launched another expedition against Brandenburg. Although nominal leadership of the troops was given by Bolesław to his young nephew Przemysł II, the expedition was actually headed by experienced commanders such as the voivode of Poznań, Przedpełk Łodzia, and the castellan of Kalisz Janek. They successfully reconquered both Drezdenko and Strzelce. The last campaign against Brandenburg during Bolesław's lifetime took in the summer of 1278, when Greater Poland troops advanced to Myślibórz and eventually recovered Santok.

=== Internal policy ===
Bolesław continued the policy of Przemysł I and maintained in their positions the nobles appointed by him. He also developed good relations with the Church while also trying to influence the appointment of the most important religious posts. His generosity to the clergy, allowed the Franciscans to establish a post in 1259 in Gniezno. Also during his rule the monastery of Poor Clares in Gniezno was started, which remained unfinished even at the time of Przemysł II's death.

On 16 August 1264 Bolesław granted the first written privilege to the Jews of Greater Poland (the Statute of Kalisz). It regulated the judicial authority over the Jewish population, and Jewish credit and trading activity. The comparatively liberal statute served as a basis for Jewish privileges in Poland until 1795.

=== Last years ===
In 1273, after the victorious expedition against Brandenburg, Przemysł II began to claim his own separated Duchy. Unable to face the powerful pressure, Bolesław agreed to this and given his nephew the district of Poznań. To bind Przemysł II with his politics, Bolesław arranged the marriage of his nephew with Ludgarda, daughter of Henry I the Pilgrim, Lord of Mecklenburg. In addition, Ludgarda was a granddaughter of Duke Barnim I of Pomerania, and thanks to this union the alliance with Western Pomerania was reinforced. Dukes of Greater Poland political path, however, soon spread, as Przemysł II became involved with Henry IV Probus, and Bolesław, using the imprisonment of Henry IV in 1277, tried to force financial concessions. Bolesław supported this policy with the marriage of his firstborn daughter Elisabeth with Henry V the Fat, Duke of Legnica.

Bolesław died on 14 April 1279 in Kalisz and was buried in the Archcathedral Basilica of St. Peter and St. Paul in Poznań.

== Marriage and issue ==
In 1258 Bolesław married Jolenta (Helena) (b. 1244 – d. 16/17 June aft. 1304), daughter of King Béla IV of Hungary. They had:

1. Elisabeth (b. 1261/63 – d. September 1304), married in 1273 to Henry V, Duke of Legnica.
2. Jadwiga (b. 1270/75 – d. 10 December 1339), married in January 1293 to Władysław I the Elbow-high, Duke of Kuyavia and after 1320 King of Poland.
3. Anna (b. 1276/78 – d. bef. 1300), a nun in Gniezno.

After Bolesław died without male heirs, all of the Greater Poland Duchy passed to his only nephew Przemysł II, who was crowned King of Poland in 1295 but murdered the following year. With his death the Greater Poland branch of the Piast dynasty became extinct.

== Sources ==
- Berend, Nora; Urbanczyk, Przemyslaw; Wiszewski, Przemyslaw (2013). Central Europe in the High Middle Ages: Bohemia, Hungary and Poland, c.900-c.1300. Cambridge University Press.
- Davies, Norman (1982). God's Playground: A History of Poland. Vol. I: The Origins to 1795. Columbia University Press.
- Lerski, George J. (1996). Historical Dictionary of Poland, 966-1945. Greenwood Press.

Bolesław the Pious Piast Dynasty Born: 1224/1227 Died: 14 April 1279
Preceded by Władysław Odonic	Duke of Poznań and Gniezno; 1239–1247 with Przemysł I	Succeeded by Przemysł I
Preceded by Przemysł I	Duke of Kalisz; 1244–1249 with Przemysł I	Succeeded by Przemysł I
Preceded by Przemysł I	Duke of Gniezno; 1249–1250	Succeeded by Przemysł I
Preceded by Przemysł I	Duke of Kalisz, Gniezno and Wieluń; 1253–1279	Succeeded by Przemysł II
Preceded by Przemysł I	Duke of Greater Poland; 1257–1279	Succeeded by Przemysł II
Preceded by Przemysł I	Duke of Poznań; 1257–1273	Succeeded by Przemysł II
Preceded by Ziemomysł	Duke of Inowrocław; 1271–1273	Succeeded by Leszek II the Black
