= Przemysł I of Greater Poland =

Duke of Greater Poland

Przemysł I
- Duke of Greater Poland
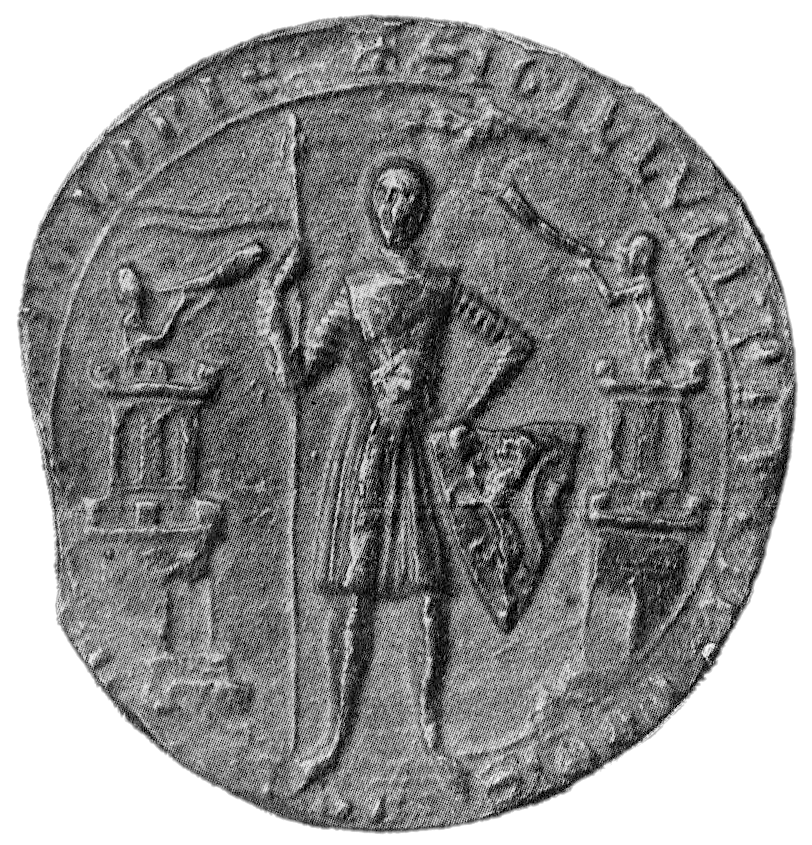
- Przemysł I's seal, dated from 1252
- Born: 4 June 1221; Trzebnica, Silesia
- Died: 4 June 1257 (aged 36); Poznań, Greater Poland
- Buried: Poznań Cathedral
- Noble family: Piast dynasty
- Spouse: Elisabeth of Wrocław
- Issue: Constance of Greater Poland; Euphrosyne of Greater Poland; Anna of Greater Poland; Euphemia of Greater Poland; Przemysł II
- Father: Władysław Odonic
- Mother: Jadwiga

Przemysł I (4 June 1221 – 4 June 1257), a member of the Piast dynasty, was Duke of Greater Poland from 1239 until his death, from 1241 with his brother Bolesław the Pious as co-ruler. He was able to re-acquire large parts of Greater Poland, ruling as Duke of Poznań and Gniezno from 1247 and, upon several inheritance conflicts with his brother, as Duke of Poznań and Kalisz from 1249, sole Duke of Greater Poland from 1250, and Duke of Poznań from 1253 until his death.

The numeral primus ("The First") was given to him in the almost contemporary Wielkopolska Chronicle.

== Life and rule ==
He was the eldest son of the Greater Polish duke Władysław Odonic by his wife Jadwiga (Jadwiga), who was likely a daughter of the Samboride duke Mestwin I of Pomerania, or a member of the Bohemian Přemyslid dynasty (a supposition supported by the name given to her son, the first in the Piast dynasty who bears it), or of the Bavarian House of Andechs. Duke Władysław Odonic ordered that his son be given a comprehensive education; as attested in the Wielkopolska Chronicle, young Przemysł was able to read Latin psalms with ease.

=== Beginning of his government ===
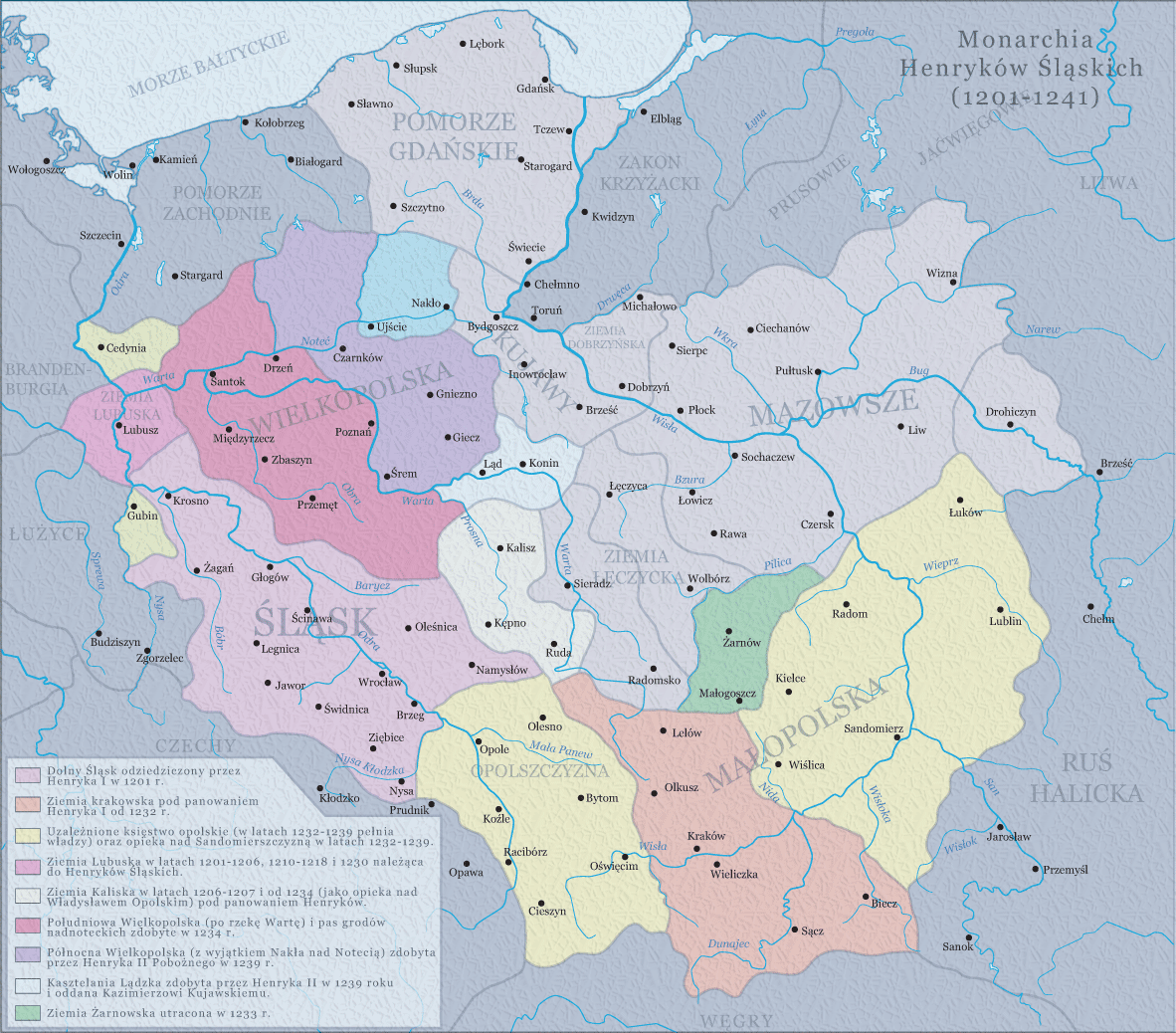
Polish duchies under the rule of Henry I and Henry II 1201–1241

Przemysł first appears in official documents signed by his father from 1232 onward, and after Władysław Odonic's death on 5 June 1239 he began his own rule, during the time of Fragmentation of Poland (1138 - ca. 1314). Two years later (in 1241), Przemysł approved his younger brother Bolesław as an official co-ruler, though this was merely a formality. In reality Przemysł reigned alone.

The principality inherited from his father was composed of northern Greater Poland, which included Ujście and Nakło (although some historians believe that Władysław Odonic lost Ujście and Nakło before his death). Subsequently, he strove to recover the remaining part of Greater Poland. In 1241, after the death of his Silesian cousin High Duke Henry II the Pious at the 1241 Battle of Legnica, Przemysł recovered Poznań and Gniezno, and subsequently managed to conquer also the parts of Greater Poland previously controlled by Dukes of Silesia.

=== Reconquest of lost lands ===
In 1242 Przemysł I reconquered Zbąszyń and Międzyrzecz from Bolesław II the Bald. The presence of Przemysł in Silesia forced the intervention of Duke Swantopolk II of Pomerania, who captured Nakło. However Przemysł quickly took back the control of the district from the Pomeranian ruler.

Despite his success, Przemysł sought to end his disputes with the Silesian Piasts and in 1244 he married Bolesław II's sister Elizabeth, at the monastery in Trzebnica. Contrary to his plans, this marriage did not calm the situation on the Silesian-Greater Poland border, but it did allow Przemysł to recover Kalisz from Duke Władysław of Opole. He failed however in his attempt to recover Wieluń, which was only annexed to Greater Poland in 1249. The actions against the sons of Henry II the Pious were completed in 1247 when Santok was recovered.

=== War in Greater Poland against the opposition, fight with the Silesian Piasts ===
In 1247 Przemysł I was forced by the local knights to give his brother Bolesław the district of Kalisz as a separated Duchy, but in foreign policy he retained full authority over Greater Poland. It was not the final division. A year later, the ruler of Greater Poland crushed the opposition by imprisoning its leaders, the Castellan of Poznań Thomas of Nałęczów and his sons. Przemysł I released them in 1250, when he was involved in the conflict between Bolesław II the Bald and his brother Konrad (husband of Przemysł I's sister Salomea). The intervention of the Greater Poland Duke helped Konrad to obtain the district of Głogów as his own independent Duchy.

In 1249 Przemysł I exchanged again territories with his brother, giving him Gniezno and becoming Duke of Poznań and Kalisz. In 1250, for unknown reasons, Przemysł had Bolesław arrested, becoming in this way the sole ruler of Greater Poland (Poznań, Gniezno and Kalisz). Only at Easter of 1253, after the Church intervention, the brothers were finally reconciled and Bolesław received the Duchy of Kalisz-Gniezno.

During the first half of the 13th century, Przemysł I promoted a more peaceful policy, working closely with his brother-in-law Konrad I of Głogów and giving his sister Euphemia in marriage to Duke Władysław of Opole. Also, he received the help of his brother Bolesław with troops against Duke Casimir I of Kuyavia for the possession of Ladzka. In 1254 he organized an armed expedition against Henry III the White, destroying part of the Bishopric of Wrocław goods (i.e. Oleśnica), for which Przemysł I was excommunicated, and the penalty was only removed after the Greater Poland Duke repaired the damages in the Church states. The next campaign against Henry III was launched in September of the same year, but this time the joint expedition of Przemysł I, his brother Bolesław and Konrad I of Głogów avoided damages of Church goods.

=== War against Brandenburgian expansion ===
In foreign policy, Duke Przemysł's main concern was the expansionism of the Ascanian margraves of Brandenburg in the west. Although he stopped the advance of Brandenburg troops into his domains (Santok in 1247, Zbąszyń in 1251 and Drezdenko in 1252), the situation remained tense on the western border. To address this problem, between 1254 and 1255 Przemysł I tried to establish warmer relations with the House of Ascania through the betrothal of his eldest daughter Constance with Conrad, son of Margrave John I (the marriage took place after Przemysł I's death, in 1260). However, this strategy ultimately back-fired politically as the Ascanians used the marriage to claim rights over the western region of Greater Poland as their "New March".

=== Poznań, capital of Greater Poland ===
In 1253 Przemysł I chose as his capital the city of Poznań, situated on the left bank of the Warta River. He also began the building of the Royal Castle on the hill overlooking the town.

== Religious policy ==
The political line of Przemysł was based on closer cooperation with the Church (especially the Bishops of Poznań, Bogufał II and Bogufał III) which caused the opposition of the knighthood. In 1244 local knights rebelled against him and tried to abolish the judicial and tax immunity gained by the Bishops from Władysław Odonic. Przemysł initially accepted the request, but in 1252 he reestablished the former privilege, and even expanded them even further.

Despite periodic troubles with his lay subjects, Przemysł I had the support of a large group of trusted advisers, such as the Governor of Poznań Przedpełk Łódź, the castellan of Poznań Boguchwał, the Judge Domarat Grzymalita, and the master of the hunt Pakosław Awdaniec.

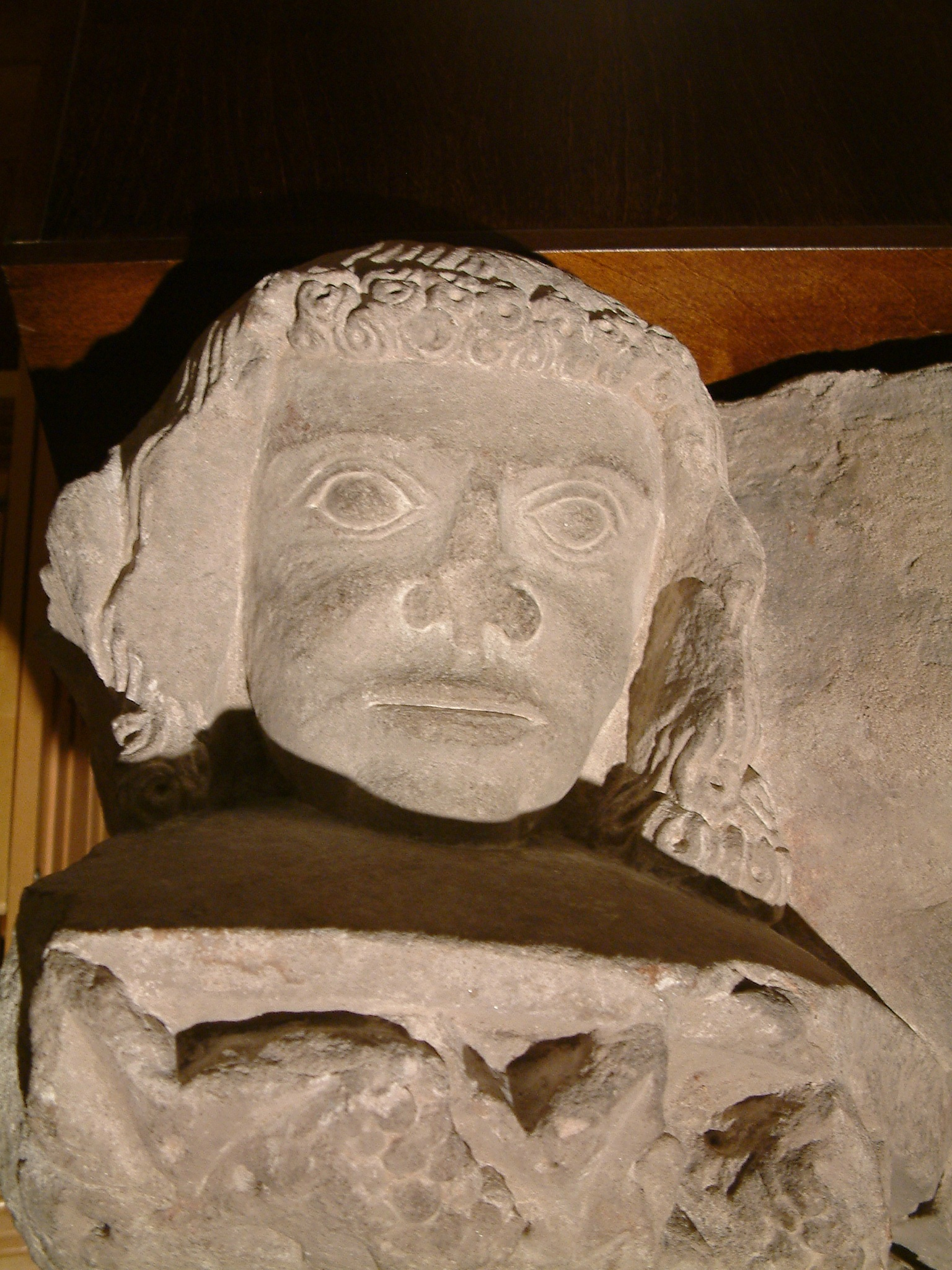
Head traditionally recognised as face of Przemysł I from the Church of Holiest Heart of Jesus and Mother of God of Consolation in Poznań.

On 8 May 1254 Przemysł took part in the national Congress of Piast princes at Kraków which convened for the canonization of St. Stanislaus. Among the princes who participated were his brother Bolesław, Casimir I of Kuyavia, Siemowit I of Masovia, Władysław of Opole and the host, Bolesław V the Chaste. The establishment of friendly contacts with his relatives proved useful one year later, when Duke Mestwin II of Pomerania captured the district of Nakło. After the following war Przemysł was only able to recover Nakło after paying 500 pieces of silver in 1256.

== Death ==
Przemysł I died in Poznań on 4 June 1257 and was buried in the Wawel Cathedral. The head was displayed in the vault of the Church of Holiest Heart of Jesus and Mother of God of Consolation in Poznań. A painting in the Historical Museum of Poznań City Hall is believed to be Przemysł I's portrait, but this has been questioned by art historians.

== Marriage and children ==
In 1244 Przemysł I married with Elisabeth (ca. 1232 – 16 January 1265), daughter of Henry II the Pious, Duke of Wrocław. They had:

1. Constance (1245/46 – 8 October 1281), married in 1260 to Conrad, Margrave of Brandenburg-Stendal.
2. Euphrosyne (1247/50 – 17/19 February 1298), Abbess of St. Clara in Trzebnica.
3. Anna (1253 – aft. 26 June 1295), Abbess at Owińska.
4. Euphemia (1253 – 5 September 1298), twin of Anna; a nun at St. Clara, Wrocław.
5. Przemysł II (posthumously, 14 October 1257 – 8 February 1296).

At the time of Przemysł I's death, his wife was five months pregnant with their last child. His brother Bolesław took over the government of all his domains. After his birth, young Przemysł II remained under the tutelage of his uncle until 1273, when he received Poznań as his own district. Eventually, Przemysł II inherited the whole of Greater Poland after his uncle's death in 1279, subsequently becoming King of Poland in 1295. With his death one year later, the Greater Poland branch of the Piast dynasty, descendants of Duke Mieszko III the Old became extinct.

== See also ==
- Piast dynasty
- List of Polish monarchs
- Dukes of Greater Poland
- Przemysł II of Poland
- Royal Castle, Poznań
- Church of St. John the Baptist in Gniezno established by Przemysł I and Bolesław the Pious

== Footnotes ==
Przemysł I of Greater Poland Piast Dynasty Born: 1220/1221 Died: 4 June 1257
Preceded by Władysław Odonic	Duke of Greater Poland; 1239–1257	Succeeded by Bolesław the Pious
Preceded by Władysław Odonic	Duke of Gniezno; 1239–1249 with Bolesław (1239–1247)	Succeeded by Bolesław the Pious
Preceded by Władysław Opolski	Duke of Kalisz; 1244–1247 with Bolesław	Succeeded by Bolesław the Pious
Preceded by Władysław Opolski	Duke of Wieluń; 1249–1253	Succeeded by Bolesław the Pious
Preceded by Bolesław the Pious	Duke of Poznań; 1249–1257	Succeeded by Bolesław the Pious
Preceded by Bolesław the Pious	Duke of Kalisz; 1249–1253	Succeeded by Bolesław the Pious
Preceded by Bolesław the Pious	Duke of Gniezno; 1250–1253	Succeeded by Bolesław the Pious
