= Trzebnica =

Town in Lower Silesian Voivodeship, Poland

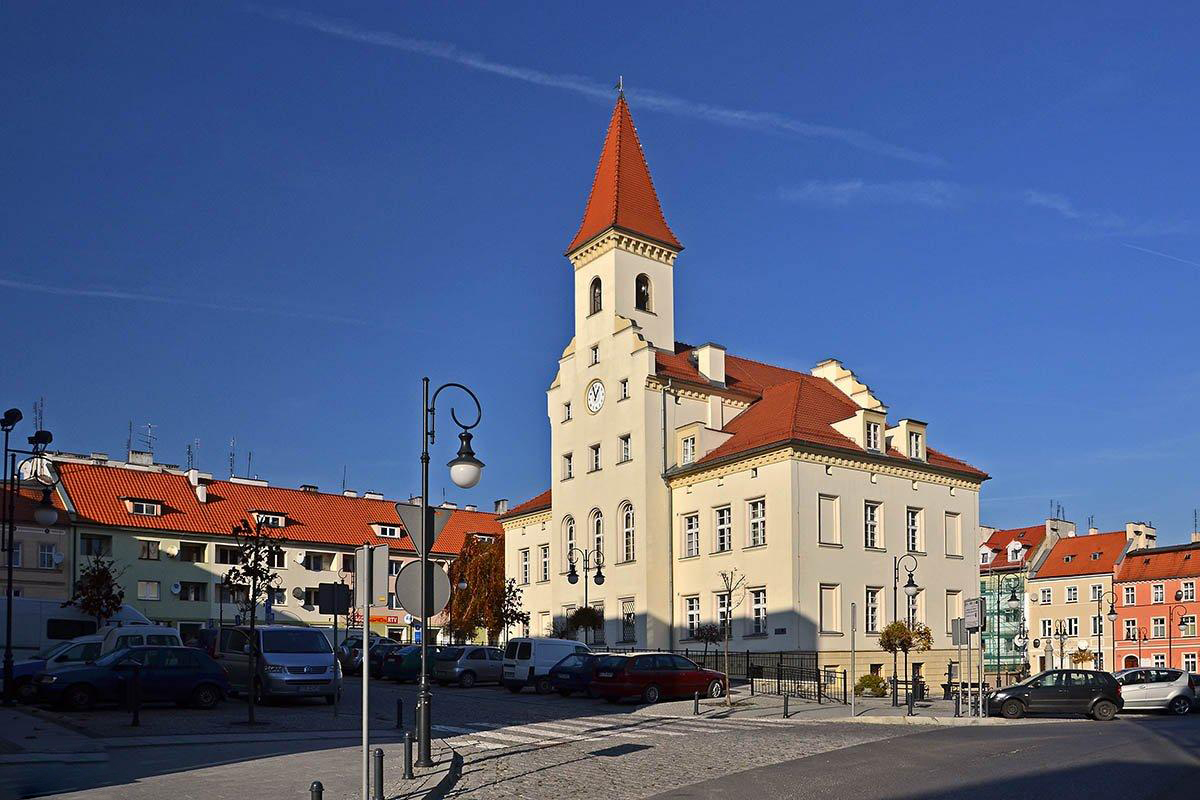
- Trzebnica town hall and market square

- Flag Coat of arms

- Location within Poland
- Coordinates: 51°18′18″N 17°3′41″E
- Country: Poland
- Voivodeship: Lower Silesian
- County: Trzebnica
- Gmina: Trzebnica
- First mentioned: 1138
- Town rights: 1250

Government
  - Mayor: Krystyna Haładaj

Area
  - Total: 8.36 km^{2} (3.23 sq mi)
- Highest elevation: 210 m (690 ft)
- Lowest elevation: 160 m (520 ft)

Population (2019-06-30)
  - Total: 13,331
  - Density: 1,590/km^{2} (4,130/sq mi)
- Time zone: UTC+1 (CET)
  - Summer (DST): UTC+2 (CEST)
- Postal code: 55-100
- Car plates: DTR
- Website: https://trzebnica.pl

Trzebnica (Polish pronunciation: [tʂɛbˈɲit͡sa]; German: Trebnitz, Czech: Třebnice) is a town in Lower Silesian Voivodeship in south-western Poland. It is the seat of Trzebnica County, and of the smaller administrative district (gmina) called Gmina Trzebnica. It is part of the Wrocław metropolitan area. As of 2019, it has a population of 13,331.

Founded in the medieval period, Trzebnica is home to the Sanctuary of St. Jadwiga, one of the historical burial sites of Polish monarchs and consorts and a regional pilgrimage site since the 14th century, listed as a Historic Monument of Poland.

Trzebnica was the temporary capital of Lower Silesia in 1945. In 2017, the town was the co-host of the World Games (orienteering, middle distance).

== Geography ==
Trzebnica lies in the Trzebnickie Hills, approximately 3.5 mi (6 km) north of the regional capital Wrocław.

== History ==
=== Middle Ages ===
Trzebnica was an early medieval religious and trading center, possibly more important than Wrocław. In the 12th century, the area was among the possessions of the Premonstratensian St. Vincent monastery at Wrocław. Trzebnica itself was first mentioned in an 1138 deed, then held by the Polish voivode Piotr Włostowic and later seized by the Silesian duke Władysław II the Exile. As a result of the fragmentation of Poland it was part of the Silesian province of Poland.

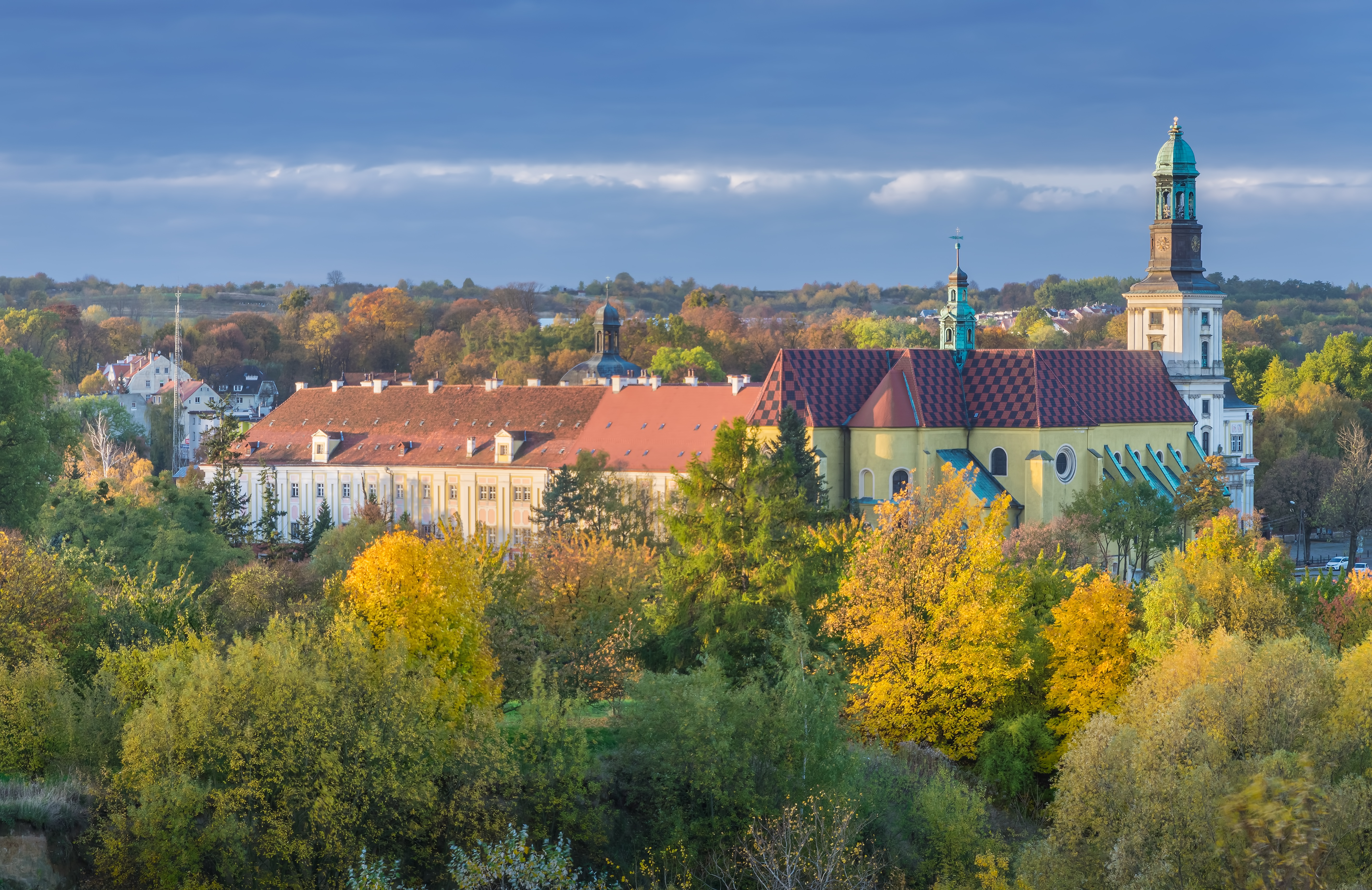
Sanctuary of St. Jadwiga

In 1202 Duke Henry I the Bearded and his wife Hedwig of Andechs founded a Cistercian convent, present-day Sanctuary of St. Jadwiga in Trzebnica, the first in Poland. The couple signed the deed of donation on 23 June 1203 in the presence of Hedwig's brother Ekbert Bishop of Bamberg; the monastery was settled with German nuns descending from Bamberg in Franconia. In 1218 Hedwig's daughter Gertrude became abbess of Trzebnica, the first of many Piast princesses to hold this office. After Duke Henry died in 1238 and was buried in the church, his widow moved to the Cistercian convent which by now was led by her daughter. Hedwig died in October 1243 and was buried there also, while some of her relics are preserved at Andechs Abbey in Bavaria, she was canonized in 1267.

In 1250 Trzebnica received town privileges, it passed under the jurisdiction of the Lower Silesian Duchy of Oleśnica in 1323, a Bohemian fief from 1328. In 1430, the town was plundered by the Hussites. In 1480 Duke Konrad X the White granted the town to the Cistercian abbey.

=== Modern era ===
Town was devastated by fires in 1456, 1505, 1511 and 1534. Some 1,600 people died during an epidemic in 1568. In the 16th and 17th century linen-making developed and in the 18th century clothmaking developed. There were up to 90 clothmakers. As part of the Holy Roman Empire, the town was plundered by Swedish forces during the Thirty Years' War. The nuns then had to flee across the border to nearby Poland. After the war the premises were rebuilt in its present Baroque style. In the 17th century Trzebnica belonged to the Polish-speaking area in Silesia. The monastery remained under the jurisdiction of the Catholic Church in Poland. Many of the nuns were Polish, and in 1668, only four of the 31 nuns had German surnames.

In 1742, Austria ceded Trzebnica (Trebnitz) with most of Silesia to the Kingdom of Prussia following the Treaty of Breslau. Clothmaking collapsed at the beginning of the 19th century. The monastery was finally securalized in 1810. In 1870 the Order of Saint John acquired the former abbey's estates to establish a hospital, cared for by the Sisters of Mercy of St. Borromeo up to today. At the turn of the 19th and 20th centuries, the town and its surroundings still had a significant Polish population. It was heavily damaged during the Vistula–Oder Offensive of the Red Army in the last days of World War II.

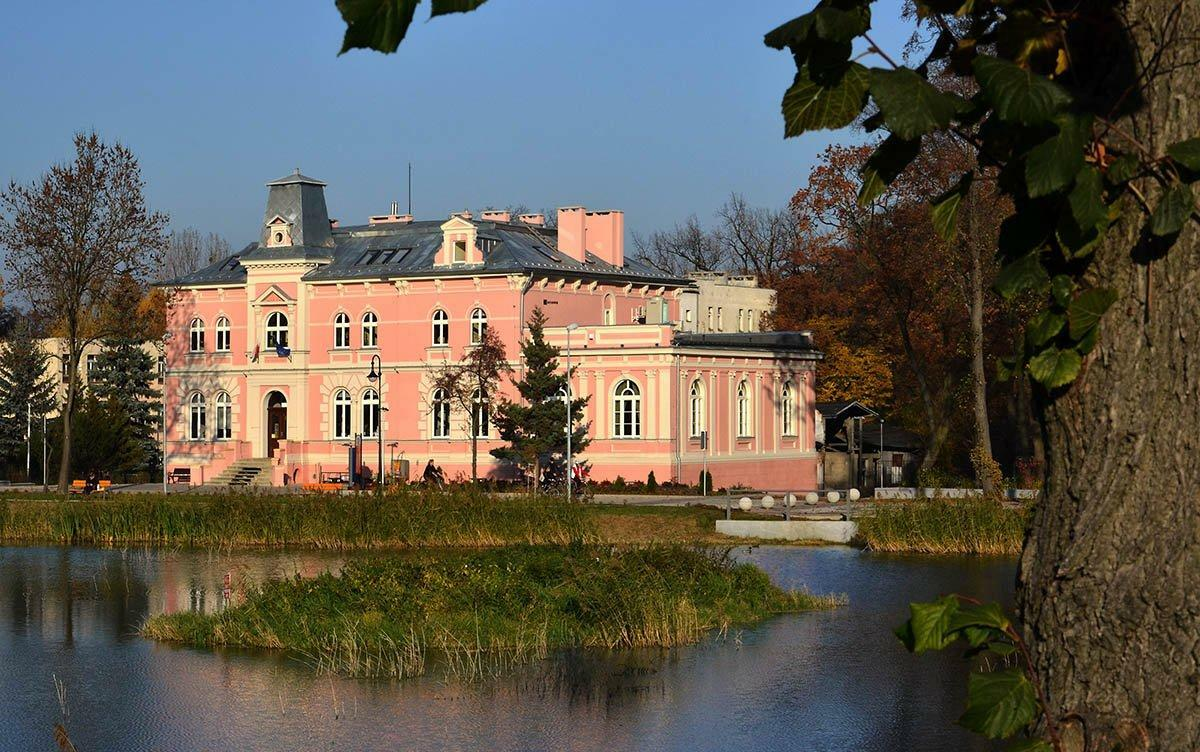
County Office

After Nazi Germany's defeat in World War II, the town was placed under Polish administration in accordance with the Potsdam Agreement. The remaining German population was expelled and replaced by ethnic Poles. From April to June 1945, Trzebnica (instead of Wrocław) was the first post-war regional capital of the Lower Silesian (Wrocław) Voivodeship.

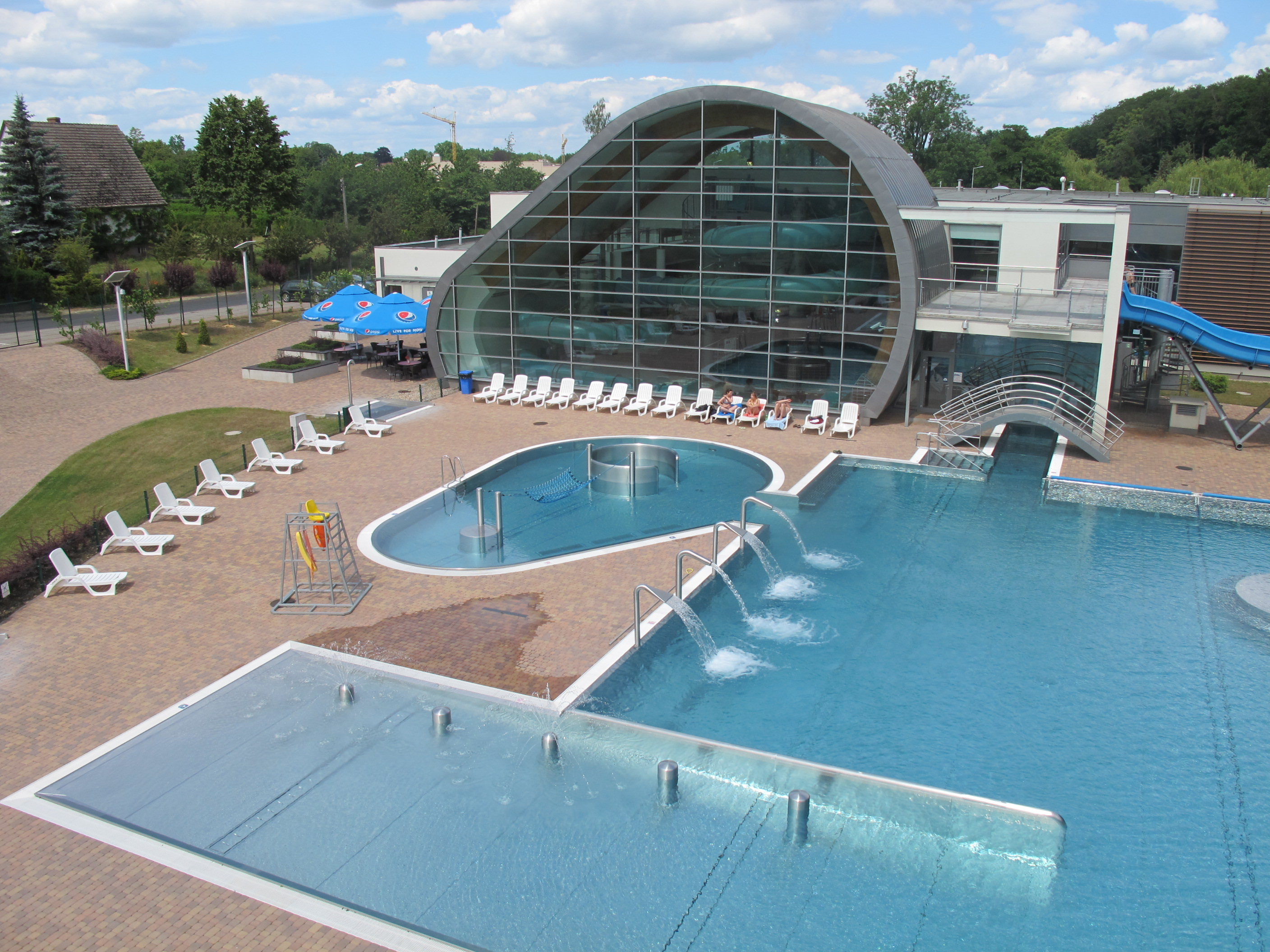
Water park in Trzebnica

== Notable people ==
- Saint Agnes of Bohemia (1211–1282), daughter of King Ottokar I of Bohemia, educated at Trzebnica Abbey
- Przemysł I of Greater Poland (1220/21–1257), Duke of Greater Poland
- Euphrosyne of Greater Poland (1247/50–1298), daughter of Duke Przemysł I of Greater Poland, abbess of Trzebnica from 1278
- Jan Willenberg (1571–1613), author of woodcuts, prints and drawings active in Moravia and Bohemia.
- Marie Leszczyńska (1703–1768), Polish princess, daughter of King Stanisław I Leszczyński of Poland, queen consort of France (born here)
- Ernst Niekisch (1889–1967), German politician and exponent of National Bolshevism (born here)
- Gila von Weitershausen (born 1944), German actress
- Ireneusz Mamrot (born 1970), Polish football coach
- Krzysztof Ulatowski (born 1980), former Polish footballer
- Mateusz Gradecki (born 1994), DP World Tour affiliated golfer

== Twin towns – sister cities ==
See twin towns of Gmina Trzebnica.
