= Conrad, Margrave of Brandenburg-Stendal =

Margrave of Brandenburg

- Born: c. 1240
- Died: 1304
- Buried: Chorin Abbey
- Noble family: House of Ascania
- Spouse: Constance of Greater Poland
- Father: John I, Margrave of Brandenburg
- Mother: Sophia of Denmark

Margrave Conrad I of Brandenburg (c. 1240 – 1304) was a member of the House of Ascania and a co-ruler of Brandenburg.

== Life ==
Conrad I was the fourth of six children of Margrave John I of Brandenburg and his wife Sophia, daughter of King Valdemar II of Denmark. He was 26 years old when, in 1266, his father died and he and his elder brothers John II and Otto IV became co-rulers of Brandenburg.

Conrad went on to rule in the newly acquired Neumark part of Brandenburg east of the Oder River, though he rarely appeared on the political scene. On one occasion, he assisted his brother Otto IV, when they allied with Duke Mestwin II of Pomerelia according to the 1269 Treaty of Arnswalde, occupying the Pomerelian city of Gdańsk and gaining the Pomeranian territory around Rügenwalde.

He died in 1304 and was buried beside his wife in Chorin Abbey. There is an entry in the register at Chorin as follows:

Anno 1304 ist zu Sched (?) gestorben Markgraf Conrad (I.) Churfürst zu Brandenburg und ist allhier begraben.

— Theodor Fontane, Wanderungen durch die Mark Brandenburg

Anno 1304 Margrave Conrad (I), Elector in Brandenburg died at Sched (?) and was buried here.

== Marriage and issue ==
Conrad was married to Constance of Poznań (d. 1281), daughter of the Piast duke Przemysł I of Greater Poland. Together they had four children:

- John IV (c. 1261 – 1305)
- Otto VII (d. 1308), Knight Templar
- Waldemar (c. 1280 – 14 August 1319 in Bärwalde)
- Agnes (d. 1329) married in 1300 with Prince Albert I of Anhalt-Zerbst (d. 1316)

== Ancestors ==
Ancestors of Conrad, Margrave of Brandenburg-Stendal

16. Albert the Bear
8. Otto I, Margrave of Brandenburg
17. Sophie of Winzenburg
4. Albert II, Margrave of Brandenburg
18. Floris III, Count of Holland
9. Ada of Holland
19. Ada of Huntingdon
2. John I, Margrave of Brandenburg
20. Dedi III, Margrave of Lusatia
10. Conrad II, Margrave of Lusatia
21. Matilda of Heinsberg
5. Matilda of Groitzsch
22. Mieszko III the Old
11. Elisabeth of Poland
23. Elisabeth of Hungary
1. Conrad, Margrave of Brandenburg-Stendal
24. Canute Lavard
12. Valdemar I of Denmark
25. Ingeborg of Kiev
6. Valdemar II of Denmark
26. Volodar of Minsk
13. Sophia of Minsk
27. Richeza of Poland
3. Sophie of Denmark
28. Alfonso I of Portugal
14. Sancho I of Portugal
29. Maud of Savoy
7. Berengaria of Portugal
30. Ramon Berenguer IV, Count of Barcelona
15. Dulce of Aragon
31. Petronilla of Aragon

== Footnotes ==
Conrad, Margrave of Brandenburg-Stendal House of Ascania Born: c. 1240 Died: 1304
Preceded by John I	Margrave of Brandenburg; With: John II	Succeeded by Waldemar
