= Agnes of Wrocław =

Silesian princess from the Piast dynasty

- Agnieszka
- Born: likely between 1230 and 1236
- Died: May 14, after 1277
- Years active: 1269/1272–1278
- Parent(s): Henry II the Pious and Anne of Bohemia
- Religion: Catholicism
- Church: Latin Church

Agnes of Wrocław (born likely between 1230 and 1236, died 14 May after 1277) was a Silesian princess from the Piast dynasty, a Cistercian nun, and the abbess of the Trzebnica Abbey from 1269/1272 to 1278.

She was the daughter of the Silesian, Kraków, and Greater Poland Duke Henry II the Pious and Anne, daughter of the King of Bohemia, Ottokar I.

== Biography ==
The exact birthdate of Agnes is uncertain, but it is most likely between 1230 and 1236. Births before 1230 are considered unlikely, as Agnes would have been mentioned in the Life of Saint Hedwig (written in 1300), which describes her grandmother Hedwig of Silesia, who lived in the Trzebnica Abbey until her death in 1243. She could not have been born after 1236 either, as she became a nun by 1248 at the latest, which implies she would have reached the canonical age of 12 by that year according to the law at the time.

Agnes was the daughter of Henry II the Pious, Duke of Silesia, Kraków, and Greater Poland, and Anne. She is considered one of the younger children of this royal couple. In the Genealogy of Saint Hedwig, she is listed second among the daughters of Henry II. However, in historiography, it is assumed that she was younger than her sisters who were married off: Gertrude, Constance, and Elisabeth. Agnes is placed eighth among the named children of Henry II and Anne, between Konrad I and Ladislaus.

She was named after four earlier women from the Silesian Piast dynasty who bore the name Agnes: her great-great-grandmother, the wife of the Piast progenitor Władysław II the Exile; her great-grandmother, the mother of Saint Hedwig of Silesia; her aunt, the sister of her father; and another aunt, the sister of her mother.

Agnes was raised in the Trzebnica Abbey, where her aunt, Gertrude, was the abbess. The abbey's atmosphere, influenced by her grandmother Hedwig's piety, played a major role in shaping her early years. As with her sister Elisabeth, there are suggestions that Agnes may have been briefly removed from the abbey by her brother Bolesław II the Horned, possibly with the intent of arranging a political marriage for her. However, that plan fell through, and Agnes returned to the abbey.

Agnes became a nun at the Trzebnica Abbey by 1248. In that year, as a nun, she accompanied her aunt Gertrude on travels to various dukes with whom they shared familial ties, seeking privileges and donations for the monastery. Agnes' advocacy for the community was also evident in 1262, when she secured support at a gathering in Danków, including from Duchess Kinga, as evidenced by a document from Duke Bolesław the Pious. In 1267 or 1268, Agnes took part in the translation (relic transfer) of her grandmother, Hedwig of Silesia. Between 1269 and 1272, she became the abbess of the Trzebnica Abbey.

According to a 1278 general chapter decision, she became abbess against her will, under the threat of canonical penalties. It is unclear whether she directly succeeded her aunt Gertrude, who died by 30 December 1268, or whether she was second in line after Petronela. Despite the Cistercian rules, Agnes had personal income, as confirmed by a letter from Pope Gregory X on 2 January 1273, in which she is addressed as the abbess of Trzebnica. In 1278, she resigned from the abbey's leadership but retained control over its assets as the granddaughter of the monastery's founders.

The details of Agnes' later life are unknown. She likely died on May 14, although the exact year is unclear. Since she was last recorded in sources in 1278, her death is estimated to have occurred in that year or the following. She was buried at the Trzebnica Abbey.

== Bibliography ==
- Jasiński, Kazimierz (2007). Rodowód Piastów śląskich [The Genealogy of the Silesian Piasts] (in Polish) (II ed.). Kraków: Avalon. ISBN 978-83-60448-28-1.
