= Henry II the Pious =

High Duke of Poland from 1238 to 1241

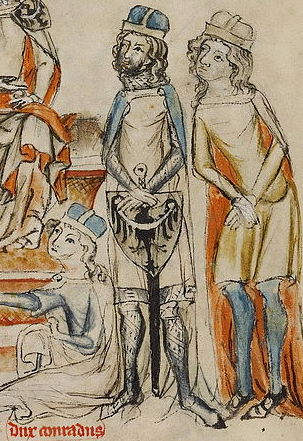
- Henry II (center) holding a shield with the arms of Silesia, Hedwig Codex, c.. 1353

High Duke of Poland
- Reign: 1238 – 1241
- Predecessor: Henry the Bearded
- Successor: Bolesław II the Horned

Duke of Silesia
- Reign: 1238–1241
- Predecessor: Henry the Bearded
- Successor: Bolesław II the Horned
- Born: c. 1196
- Died: 9 April 1241 (aged 44-45); Legnickie Pole
- Burial: St. Vincent and St. James Cathedral, Wrocław
- Spouse: Anne of Bohemia
- Issue: Constance of Wrocław; Bolesław II the Horned; Mieszko of Lubusz; Henry III the White; Konrad I of Głogów; Elisabeth of Wrocław; Ladislaus of Salzburg
- House: Silesian Piasts
- Father: Henry the Bearded
- Mother: Hedwig of Silesia

Henry II the Pious (Polish: Henryk II Pobożny; 1196 – 9 April 1241) was Duke of Silesia and High Duke of Poland as well as Duke of South-Greater Poland from 1238 until his death. Between 1238 and 1239 he also served as regent of Sandomierz and Opole–Racibórz. A member of the Silesian Piast dynasty, he was the son of Henry the Bearded and Saint Hedwig of Silesia.

Henry II inherited a substantial political position at a time when Poland remained divided among several Piast principalities. His accession marked the continuation of his father’s policy of strengthening the Silesian branch of the dynasty and extending its influence over other Polish territories, though he was unable to reunify Poland. Henry II pursued political consolidation through a combination of dynastic alliances, territorial administration, and cooperation with the Catholic Church. His rule was closely connected with the development of Silesia, which under the Piast dukes had become one of the most economically and politically significant regions of fragmented Poland. He maintained his family’s support for religious institutions and German-speaking settlers, while also seeking to preserve his authority against competing princes. His marriage to Anne of Bohemia, daughter of King Ottokar I of Bohemia, was an attempt to reinforce his position within Central Europe.

Henry's rule ended abruptly with the Mongol invasion of Poland in 1241. He assembled a coalition of forces and confronted the Mongol army at the Battle of Legnica on 9 April 1241, where his army was defeated and Henry was killed. The Mongols subsequently withdrew from Poland, but Henry’s death disrupted the consolidation of his territories, which were divided among his sons and other members of the Piast dynasty. His epithet “the Pious” reflects his reputation for religious devotion and his association with the defence of Christian Europe against the Mongol advance. He was venerated locally as a holy figure and, in October 2015, the Roman Catholic Diocese of Legnica opened up his cause for beatification, obtaining him the title of Servant of God.

== Early life ==
Henry the Pious was the second son of High Duke Henry the Bearded of Poland and Hedwig of Silesia. His elder brother, Bolesław, died in 1206. In 1213, his younger brother Konrad the Curly died during a hunt, leaving the young Henry as the sole heir of Lower Silesia. Around 1218, his father arranged his marriage to Anne, daughter of King Ottokar I of Bohemia. This union with the royal Přemyslid dynasty allowed Henry the Pious to participate actively in international politics.

Henry the Bearded quickly designated his sole surviving son as his sole heir, and from 1222, the young prince countersigned documents with his father. By 1224, he had his own seal and notary. In 1227, during a meeting of Piast dukes in Gąsawa, Henry the Bearded and High Duke Leszek I the White were ambushed. Leszek was killed and Henry was seriously wounded. Henry the Pious acted as interim duke. In 1229, Henry the Bearded was captured by Duke Konrad I of Masovia, and again, young Henry the Pious acted as interim duke. During 1229–1230, he led a military expedition to recover and secure the possession of Lubusz Land, and in 1233–1234, he actively supported his father's affairs in Prussia and Greater Poland. In 1234, Henry the Bearded named his son co-ruler. Later, Henry the Bearded took the duchies of Kraków and Silesia, and Henry the Pious was given the duchies of Silesia and Greater Poland. When Henry the Bearded died on 19 March 1238, Henry the Pious became duke of Silesia, Kraków and Greater Poland.

== Sole reign ==
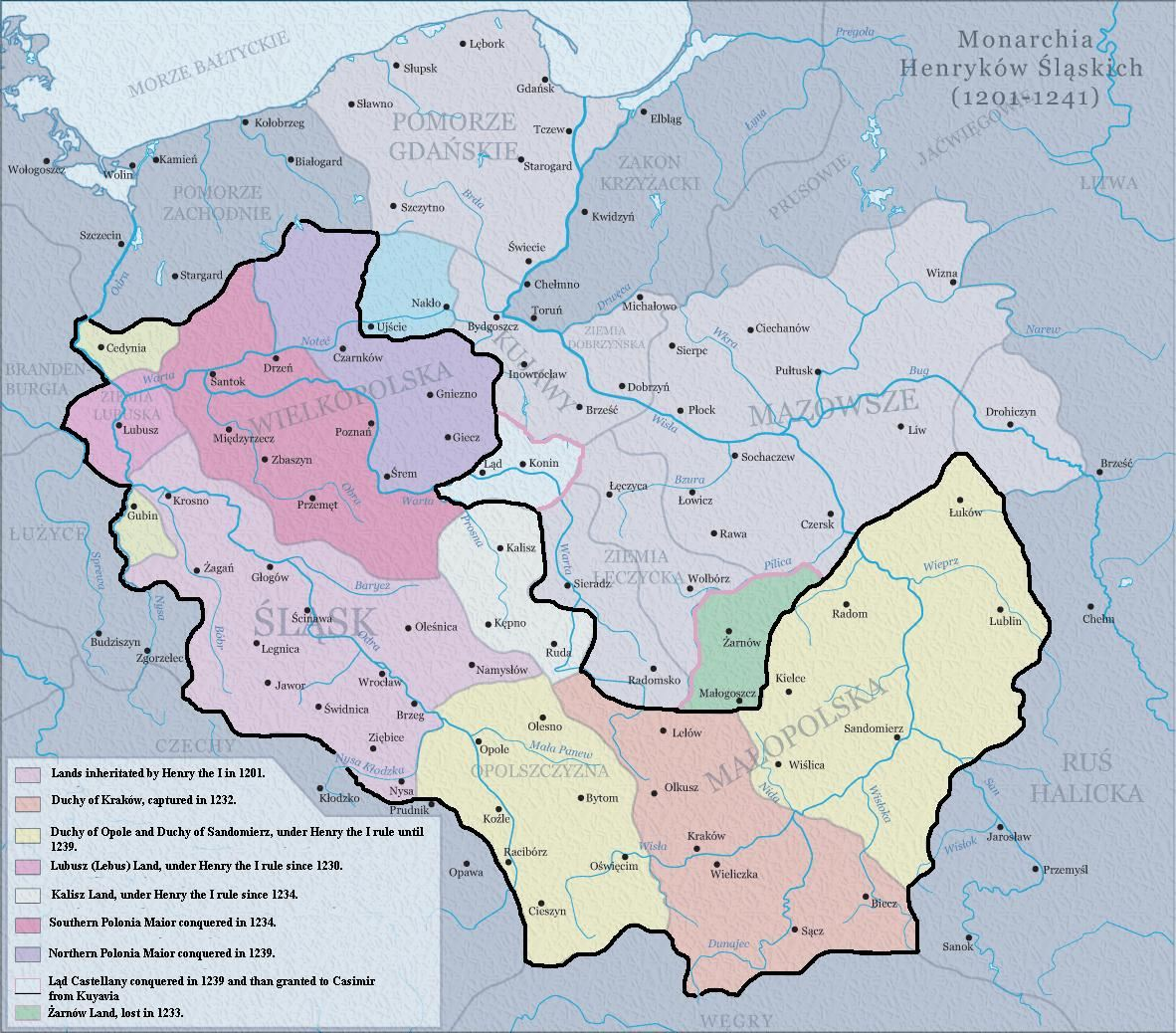
Henry II's reach of power at its greatest extent, 1239

Henry the Pious inherited Lower Silesia from his father. Southern Greater Poland and Kraków were ruled by the Piast princes, although the late duke of Greater Poland and Kraków, Władysław III, had left all his lands to Henry the Bearded. The will was ignored by Duke Konrad of Masovia and Władysław's III nephew Władysław Odonic.

Henry II could retain his authority as a regent over the Upper Silesian Duchy of Opole and Racibórz and the Duchy of Sandomierz during the minority of their rulers Mieszko II the Fat and Bolesław V the Chaste. Nevertheless, in 1239, Henry was compelled to resign the regency, although he remained on good terms with the Dukes of Opole and Sandomierz, and managed to retain Greater Polish Kalisz and Wieluń.

The situation in the northwest was more complicated: Margrave Otto III of Brandenburg took the important Greater Polish fortress at Santok and besieged Lubusz. Henry II also inherited the disputes with Konrad of Masovia, Władysław Odonic, and with the Church, led by Pełka, Archbishop of Gniezno. The situation changed unexpectedly after the death of Władysław Odonic on 5 June 1239, who left two minor sons, Przemysł I and Bolesław the Pious. Henry II took the majority of Odonic's possessions (including Gniezno), leaving Nakło nad Notecią and Ujście to Odonic's sons.

Henry then abandoned the traditional alliance of his family with the Imperial House of Hohenstaufen and supported Pope Gregory IX, immediately resolving his dispute with the Church. He then put an end to his conflicts with Konrad of Masovia by arranging the marriages of two of his daughters to two of Konrad's sons: Gertrude to Bolesław, and Constance, to Casimir I of Kuyavia. In 1239, Henry II reclaimed the Santok fortress from Margrave Otto III after Henry's victory in the Battle of Lubusz.

== Mongol invasion ==
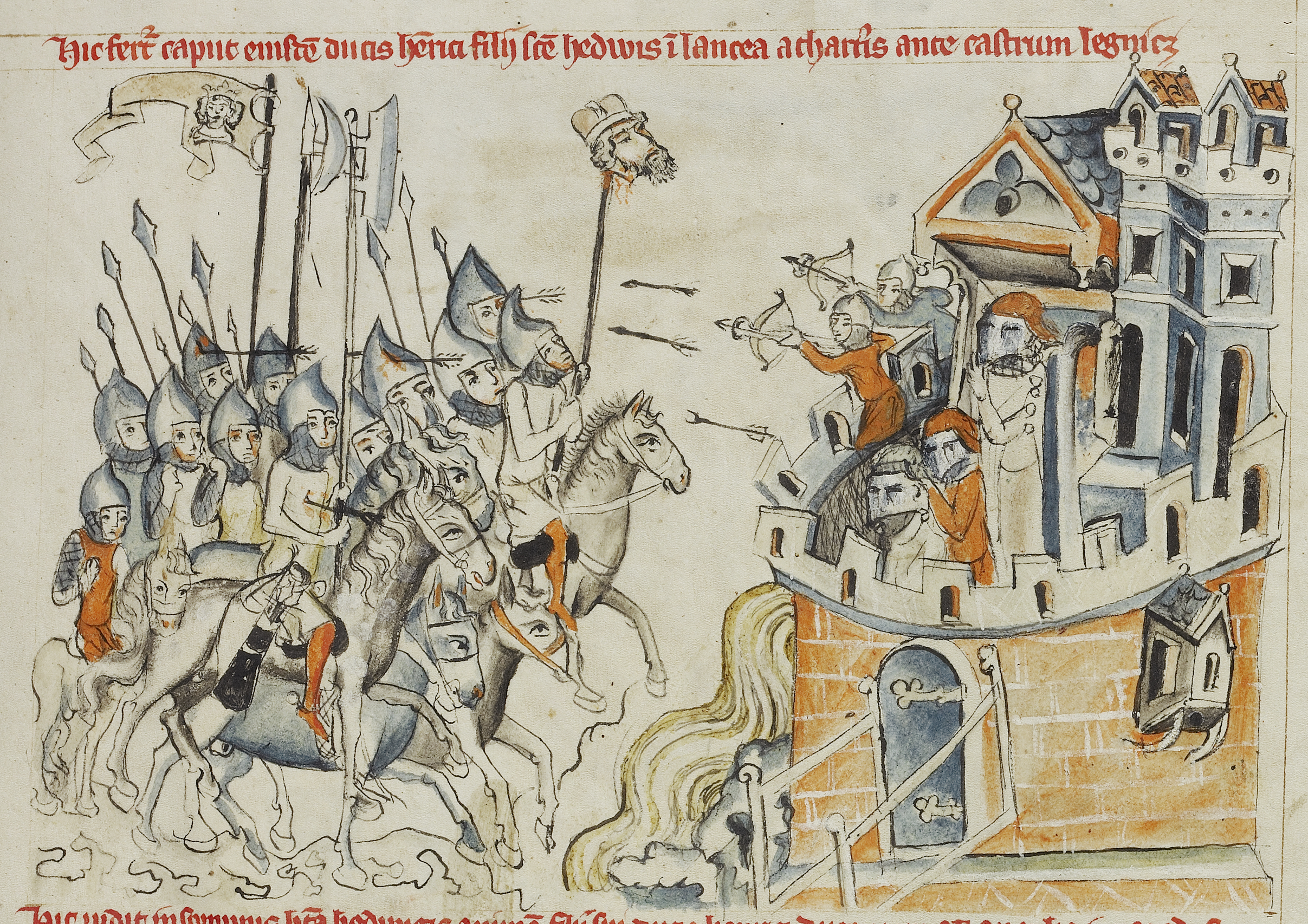
The Mongols carrying the head of Henry II before Legnica, Hedwig Codex, c. 1353

In the east, a new threat emerged with the advance of the Mongols under Batu Khan, who, after invading Rus', selected the Kingdom of Hungary as their next major target. Batu Khan determined that securing Poland was necessary before launching the campaign into Hungary. In January 1241, he sent reconnaissance forces toward Lublin and Zawichost, and the main invasion followed a month later, led by Orda with an army of around 10,000 men. In Lesser Poland, the Mongols encountered limited resistance, defeating and killing much of the Kraków and Sandomierz nobility at the Battle of Tursko (13 February) and at the Battles of Tarczek and Chmielnik (18 March), where the voivode of Kraków, Włodzimierz, and the castellan Klement of Brzeźnica were among the casualties. As a result, all of Lesser Poland, including Kraków and Sandomierz, fell under Mongol control.

Henry did not wait for the promised aid from Western rulers and concentrated the remaining troops of Lesser Poland along with his own Silesian and Greater Poland forces at Legnica. At the time, many European rulers were preoccupied with the conflict between the Holy Roman Empire and the Papacy and did not respond to Henry's appeals for assistance. The only foreign contingents to join him were those sent by King Wenceslaus I of Bohemia and a group of Knights Templar. Some sources report that additional European forces halted near Legnica, possibly out of concern that the Christian army would be vulnerable to the Mongols. The Battle of Legnica took place on 9 April 1241, where Henry was defeated and killed.

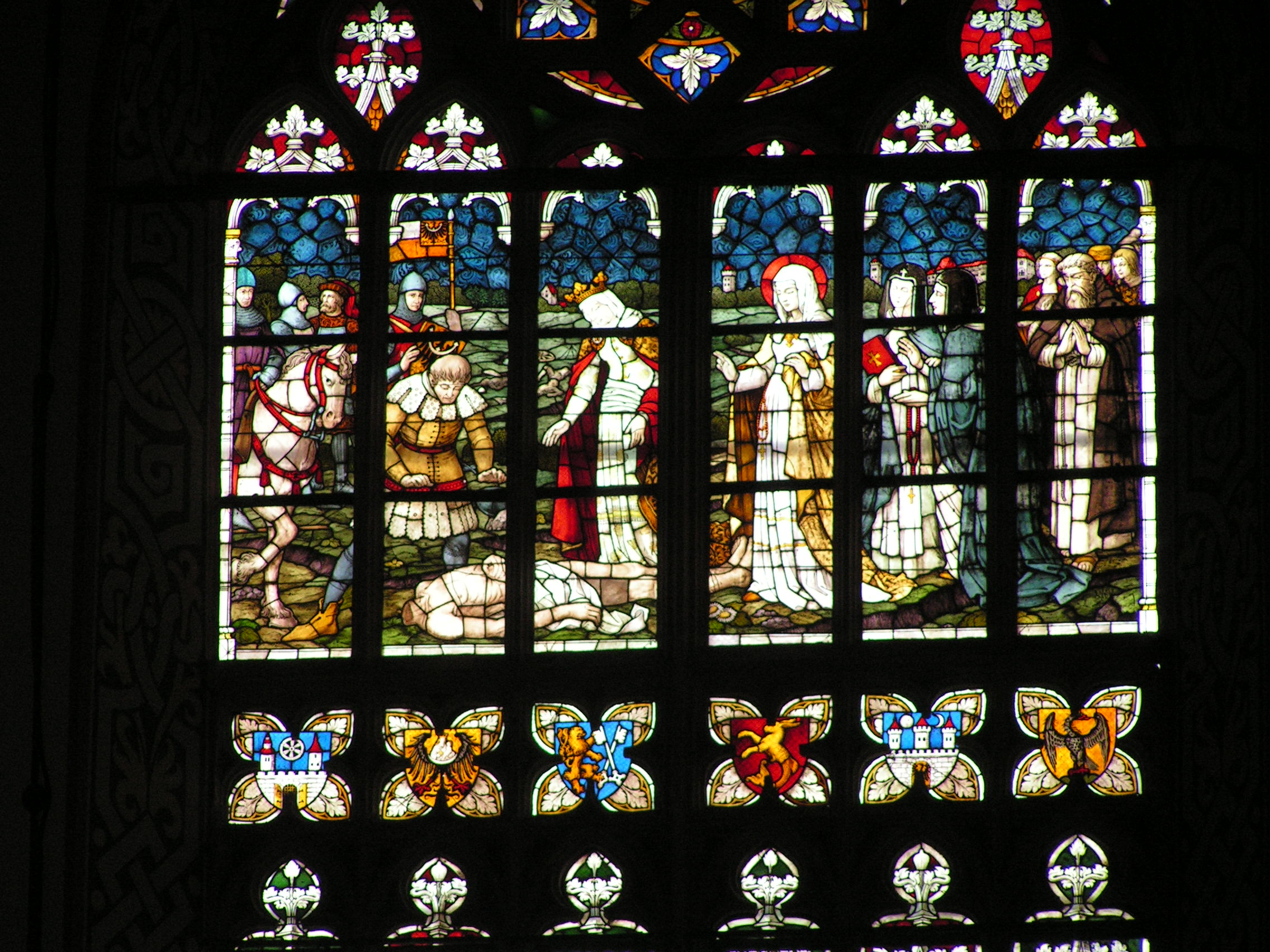
Henry's body discovered on the battlefield, as depicted in a stained glass window at the Lutheran Church of the Virgin Mary in Legnica

Some contemporary sources attributed the defeat to the lack of support from European monarchs, particularly Emperor Frederick II and King Béla IV of Hungary, as well as to the withdrawal of Henry's cousin Mieszko II the Fat, reportedly caused by a Mongol feigned retreat. Two accounts of Henry's death survive: one by Jan Długosz, now regarded as unreliable, and another by C. de Brigia in his Historii Tartatorum, based on eyewitness reports and considered more credible. The Mongols did not attempt to occupy Silesia and soon moved through Moravia toward Hungary, to rejoin Batu Khan's main force. Henry's decapitated body was identified by his wife due to his polydactyly—he had six toes on his left foot—a detail confirmed when his tomb was opened in 1832. He was buried in the crypt of the Franciscan Church of St. Vincent and St. James in Wrocław.

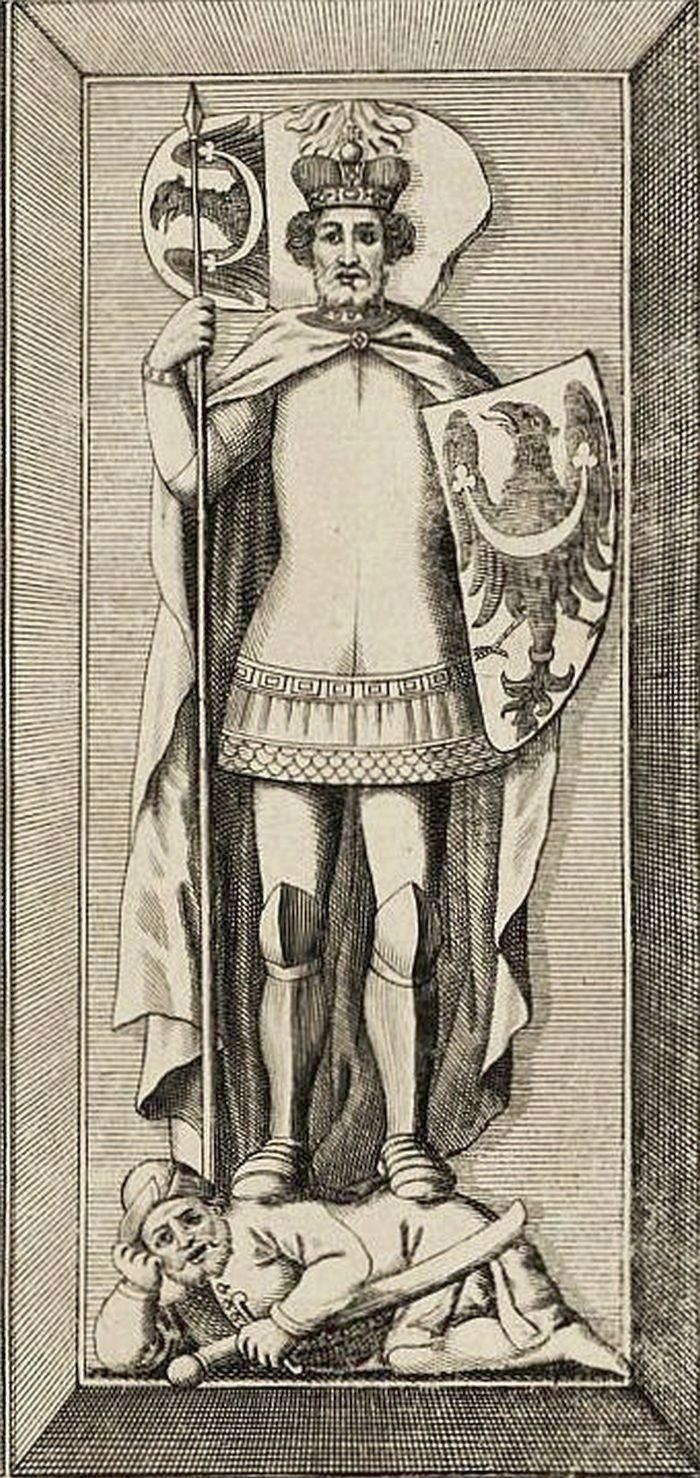
Original tomb effigy of Henry treading on a Mongol, drawing from 1733

Although Henry ruled for only three years, later Silesian, Greater Polish, and Kraków traditions portrayed him as an ideal Christian knight and martyr. His death led to the fragmentation of the Silesian Piast line into numerous ducal branches. With the exception of his grandson Henry IV Probus, these dukes did not regain the position of Polish High Duke and gradually came under the influence of the neighbouring Kingdom of Bohemia.

In 1944, during World War II, Henry's remains went missing after being taken from its tomb by German pseudo-scientists for laboratory tests; they had hoped to prove that the prince was Aryan.

== Marriage and children ==
Between 1214 and 1218, Henry married Anna (ca. 1201 – 23 June 1265), daughter of King Ottokar I of Bohemia. They had:

1. Gertrude (1218/20 – 23/30 April 1244/1247), married in 1232 to Bolesław I of Masovia;
2. Constance (1221/1227 – 1253/3 May 1257), married in 1239 to Casimir I of Kuyavia;
3. Bolesław II the Horned (1220/1225 – 26/31 December 1278);
4. Mieszko (1223/1227 – 1241/1242);
5. Henry III the White (1222/1230 – 3 December 1266);
6. Elizabeth (1224/1232 – 16 January 1265), married in 1244 to Przemysł I of Greater Poland;
7. Konrad (1228/1231 – 6 August 1273/1274);
8. Władysław (1237 – 27 April 1270, buried Salzburg Cathedral), Chancellor of Bohemia (1256), Bishop of Passau (1265) and Archbishop of Salzburg (1265–1270);
9. Agnes (1236 – 14 May after 1277), Abbess of St. Clara in Trebnitz;
10. Hedwig (1238/1241 – 3 April 1318), Abbess of St. Clara in Wrocław.

== See also ==
- History of Poland (966–1385)
- Piast dynasty
- Dukes of Silesia
- History of Silesia

== Sources ==
- Cheshire, Harold T. (1926). "The Great Tartar Invasion of Europe". The Slavonic Review. 5 (13). Modern Humanities Research Association: 89–105. JSTOR 4202032.
- Davies, Norman (1982). God's Playground: A History of Poland. Vol. I: The Origins to 1795. Columbia University Press.
- Halecki, Oskar (2000). Borderlands of Western Civilization: A History of East Central Europe. Simon Publications.
- Klaniczay, Gábor (2000). Holy Rulers and Blessed Princesses: Dynastic Cults in Medieval Central Europe. Translated by Palmai, Eva. Cambridge University Press.

Preceded by Henry the Bearded	High Duke of Poland; 1238 – 1241	Succeeded by Bolesław II the Horned
Preceded by Henry the Bearded	Duke of Wrocław; 1238 – 1241	Succeeded by Bolesław II the Horned
Preceded by Henry the Bearded	Duke of Greater Poland (Only in the Southwest); 1238 – 1241	Succeeded by Bolesław II the Horned
