= Sanctuary of St. Jadwiga, Trzebnica =

Christian sanctuary in Poland

Basilica and sanctuary of St. Jadwiga
- Bazylika i sanktuarium św. Jadwigi
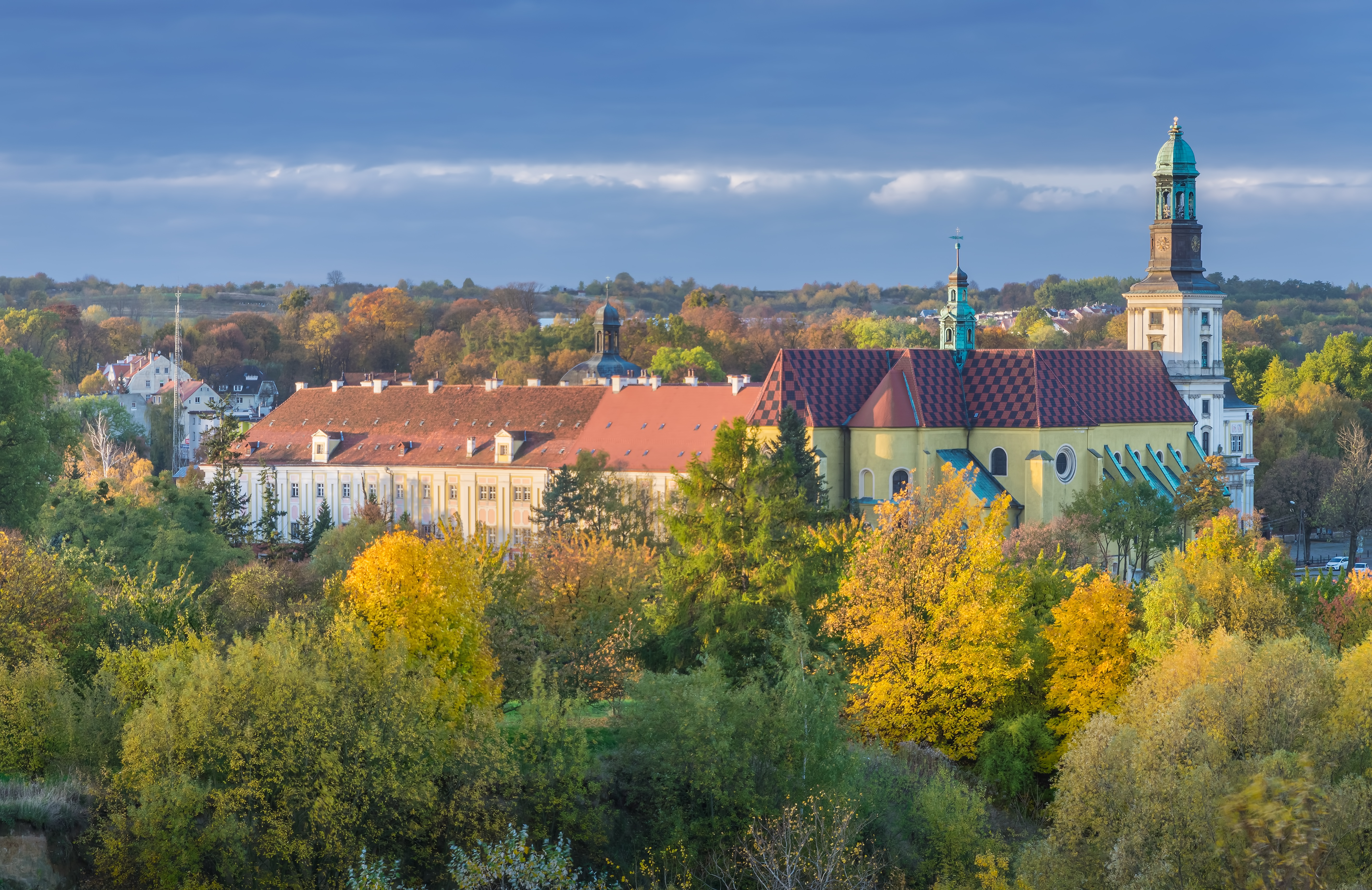
- View of the church and abbey

- 51°18′32″N 17°03′59″E
- Location: Trzebnica
- Country: Poland
- Language: Polish
- Denomination: Catholic

History
- Status: Minor basilica

Architecture
- Functional status: Active

Administration
- Archdiocese: Wrocław

Historic Monument of Poland
- Designated: 2014-07-04
- Reference no.: Dz. U. z 2014 r. poz. 957

Sanctuary of St. Jadwiga in Trzebnica, also known as Trzebnica Abbey, was a convent for Cistercian nuns in Trzebnica, north of Wrocław, in Lower Silesia, Poland. Founded in 1203, it was abandoned for a few decades during the 19th century, and was subsequently taken over by the Sisters of Mercy of St. Borromeo in 1889.

== History ==
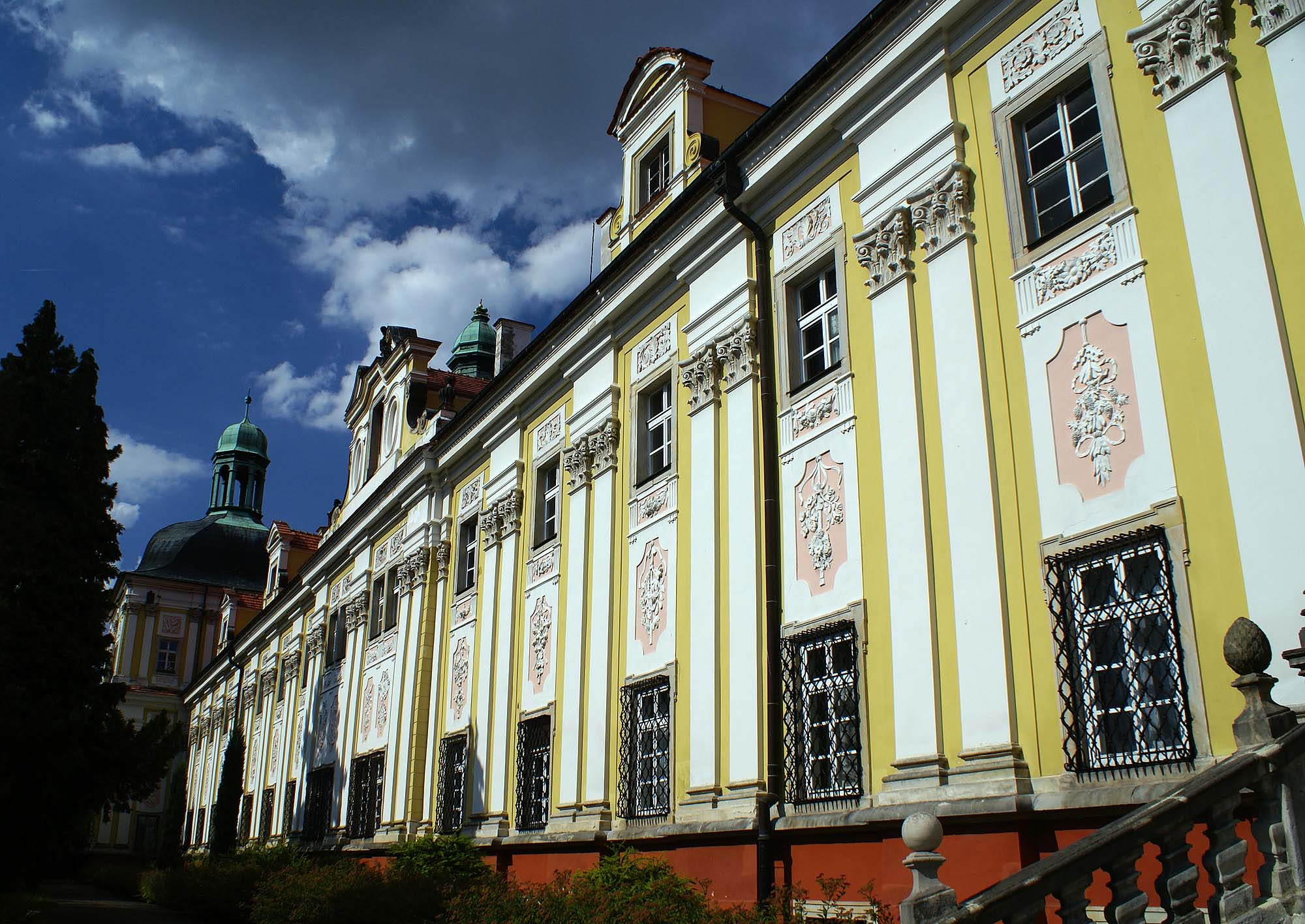
Abbey

The abbey was established by the Silesian Piast Duke Henry I the Bearded and his wife Saint Hedwig of Andechs (Polish: Święta Jadwiga Śląska), confirmed by Pope Innocent III. The legend of its foundation relates that once Duke Henry when out hunting fell into a swamp from which he could not extricate himself. In return for rescue from this perilous position, he vowed to build the abbey. With Hedwig's consent, her brother Ekbert of Andechs, then Bishop of Bamberg, chose the first nuns that occupied the convent. The first abbess was Petrussa from Kitzingen Abbey; she was followed by Gertrude, the daughter of Hedwig. The abbey was richly endowed with lands by Duke Henry. When Hedwig became a widow in 1238, she went to live at Trzebnica and was buried there.

Up to 1515, the abbesses were the first princesses of the Piast dynasty and afterwards members of the nobility. It is said that towards the end of the thirteenth century the nuns numbered 120. The abbey also became a mausoleum of many rulers of the fragmented Silesian Piasts. In 1672 there were 32 nuns and 6 lay sisters, in 1805 there were 23 nuns and 6 lay sisters. The abbey suffered from all kinds of misfortunes both in the Middle Ages and later: from famine in 1315, 1338, 1434, and 1617, from disastrous fires in 1413, 1432, 1464, 1486, 1505, 1595, and 1782. At the Protestant Reformation, most of the nuns were Polish, as were the majority until the eighteenth century. In 1668, only four of the 31 nuns had German surnames. During the Thirty Years War the nuns fled across the border on the territory of the most unaffected Polish–Lithuanian Commonwealth, as they did again in 1663 when the Turks threatened Silesia. The abbey remained under the jurisdiction of the Catholic Church in Poland.

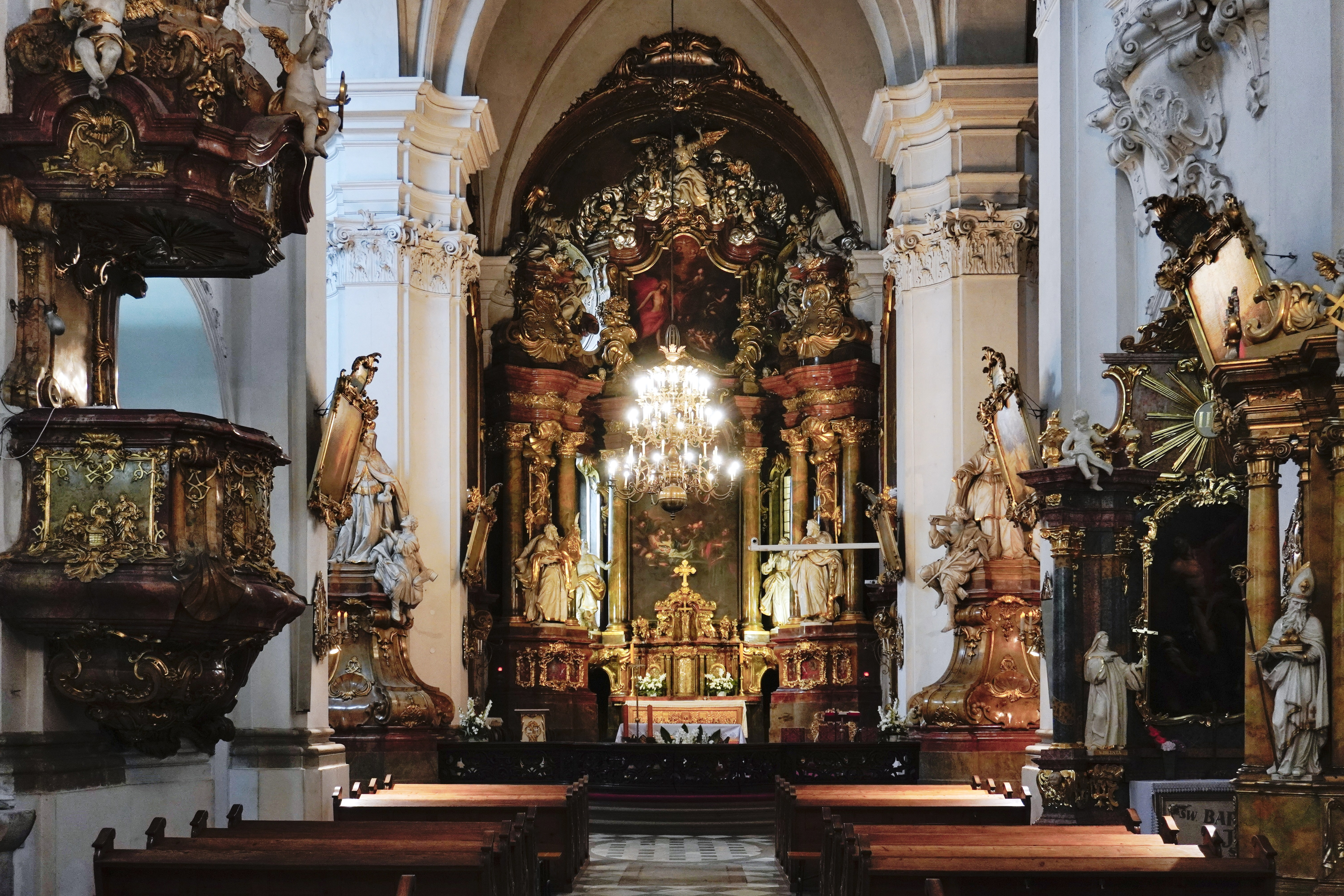
Church interior

In 1742, in the aftermath of the First Silesian War and the Treaty of Breslau, Trebnitz found itself under the governance of Protestant Prussia and started to suffer from political discrimination. The last abbess, Dominica von Giller, died on 17 August 1810, and on 11 November 1810, the abbey was suppressed and secularized by order of King Frederick William III. The building, which was very extensive, was sold later and turned into a cloth factory. In the late 19th century, the ruined abbey was bought by Knights Hospitaller and later by the female order of Sisters of St. Charles Borromeo as a hospital conducted by the sisters.

== Abbey church ==
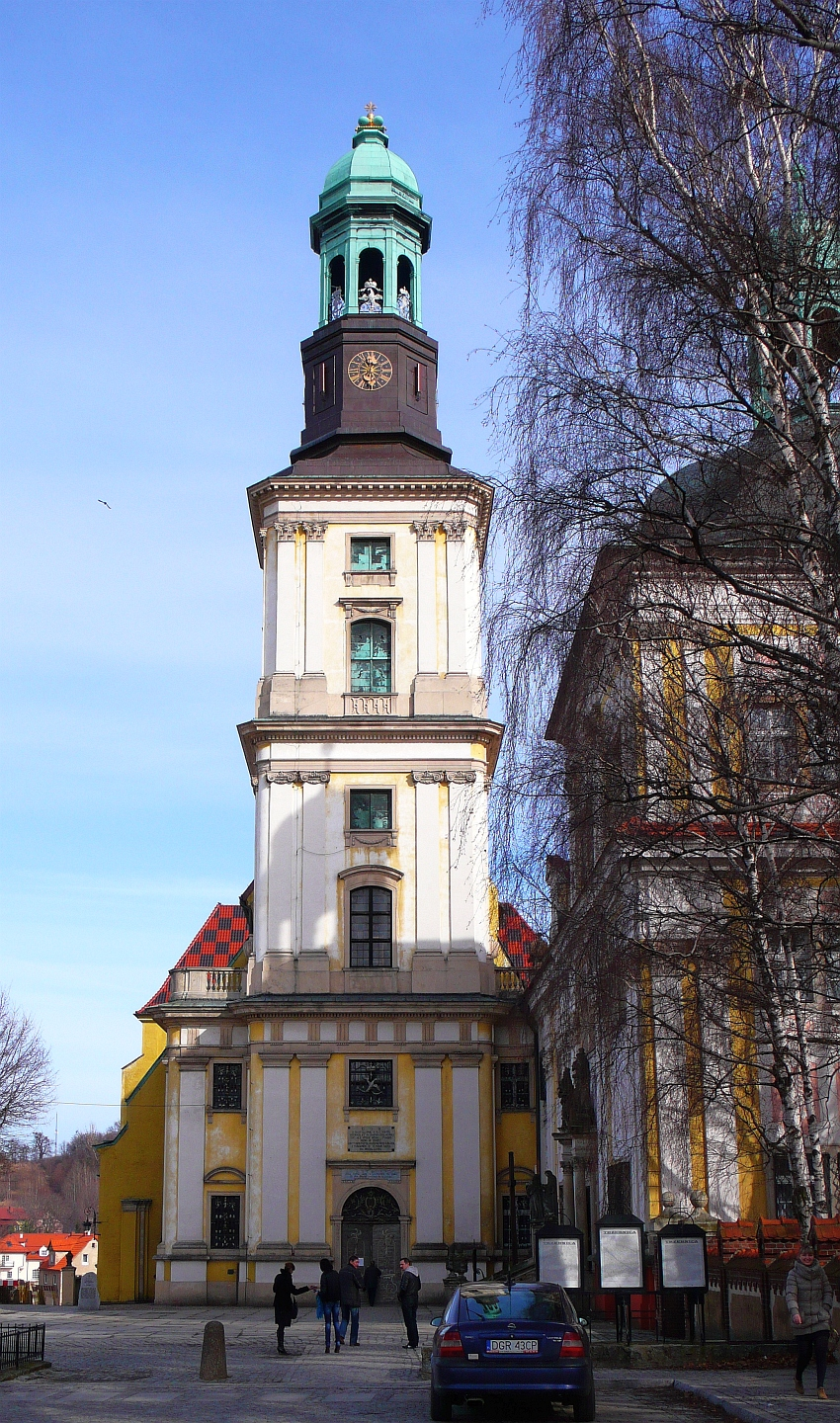
Abbey church

The church, a basilica with pillars in the late Romanesque style, to which Baroque additions were made from 1741. It features several paintings with scenes from the life of St. Hedwig by Michael Willmann. After the secularisation of the abbey, it became the Trebnitz parish church.

The grave of St. Hedwig is located in a chapel to the right of the high altar, donated by her grandson Archbishop Ladislaus of Salzburg in 1267. The grave of Duke Henry I, her husband, is in front of the altar.

== Burials ==
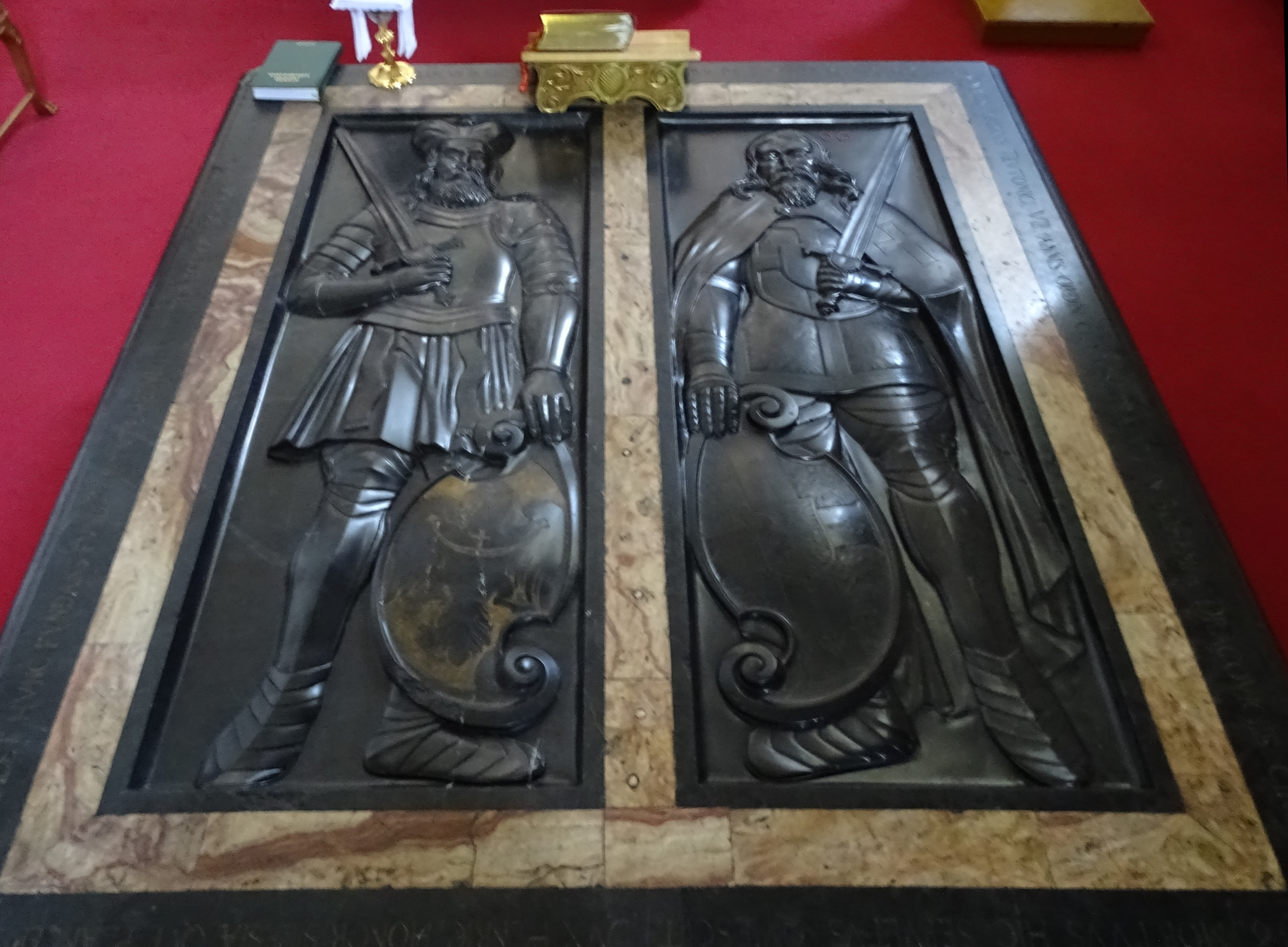
Tomb of Henry I the Bearded and Konrad von Feuchtwangen

- Konrad the Curly, son of Henry I and St. Hedwig, 1213
- Henry I the Bearded, High Duke of Poland, Duke of Silesia and Wrocław, 1238
- Hedwig of Andechs, widow, 1243
- Konrad von Feuchtwangen, Grand Master of the Teutonic Knights, 1296
- Karolina of Legnica-Brieg, last scion of the Silesian Piasts, 1707
