= Hedwig Codex =

Mid-14th century illuminated manuscript

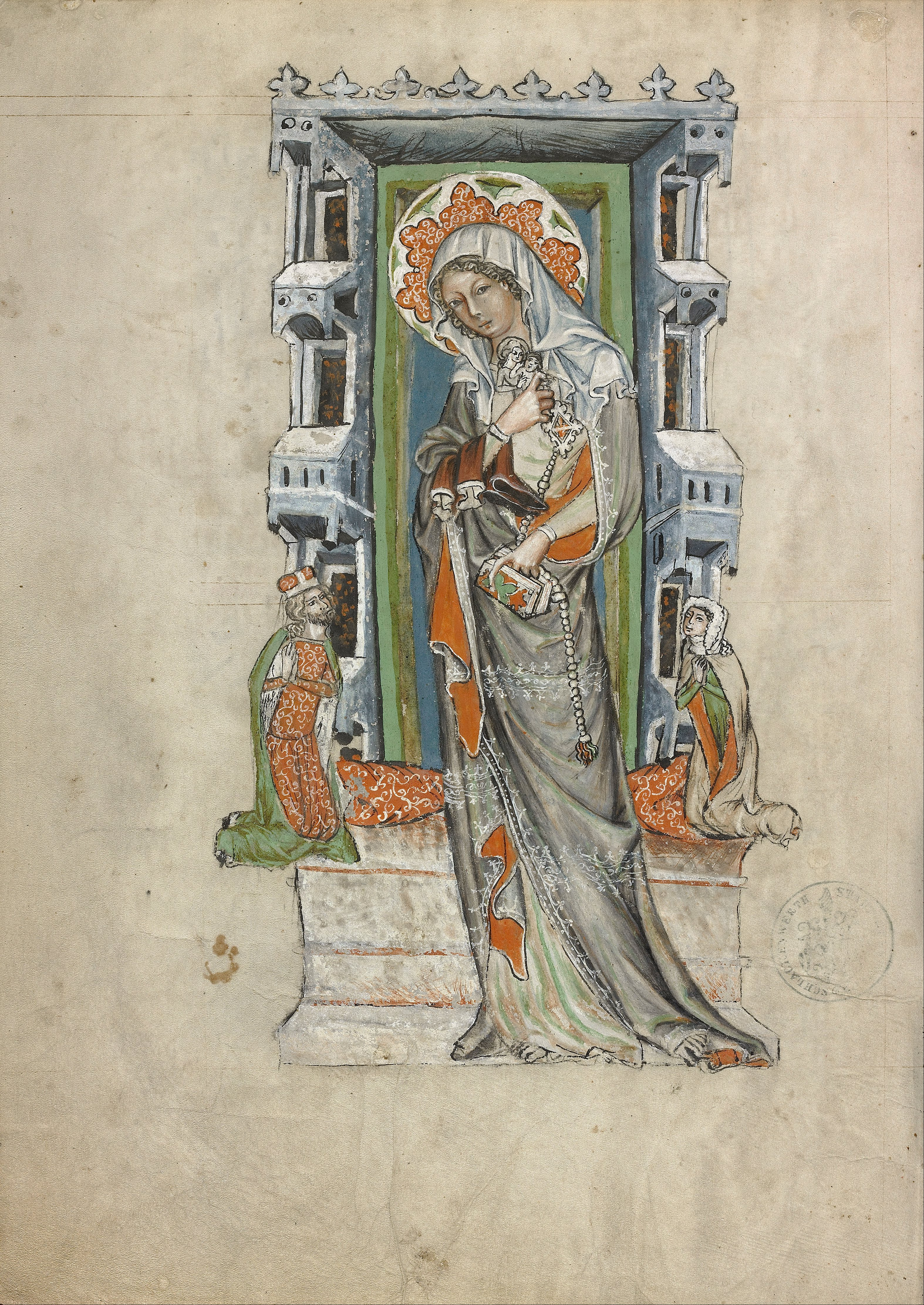
- Saint Hedwig of Silesia venerated by Duke Louis and his consort Agnes (fol. 12v)
- Also known as: Vita beatae Hedwigis
- Type: illuminated manuscript
- Date: 1353
- Place of origin: Silesia
- Language: Latin
- Author: Nicolaus of Prussia
- Illuminated by: Court workshop of Duke Louis I of Liegnitz-Brieg
- Patron: Louis I of Liegnitz-Brieg and Agnes of Glogau
- Material: Tempera colors, colored washes, and ink on parchment bound between wood boards covered with red-stained pigskin
- Size: 13 7/16 x 9 3/4 in.
- Previously kept: Collegiate church of St Hedwig, Brzeg

The Hedwig Codex, also known as the Codex of Lubin (Polish: Kodeks lubiński), is a medieval illuminated manuscript from the mid-14th century. It comprises sixty-one colored drawings and inscriptions which tell the life of Saint Hedwig, High Duchess of Poland and Silesia, her family, and events related to her canonization in 1267. The Hedwig Codex details both the married life of the Hedwig and her life within the Cistercian nunnery of Trebnitz. This art piece, a fine example of Central European Gothic art, is valued especially for its depictions of the Mongol invasion of Europe and Poland.

== History ==
=== Medieval Commission ===
The Hedwig Codex was commissioned by Louis I of Liegnitz-Brieg (Louis of Legnica and Brzeg; Polish: Ludwik I brzeski, German: Ludwig I) with his wife, Agnes of Glogau. Louis I of Liegnitz was also Saint Hedwig's great-great-great-grandson. In spite of the manuscript being made a century after her death, the codex has come to substitute for the holy saint, having a nearly relic-like status. The commission of the manuscript helped further establish a cult in Silesia that revered Saint Hedwig.

Based on Hedwig's hagiography (Latin: Vita beatae Hedwigis), the illustrated codex was produced in 1353 at the court workshop of Hedwig's descendant, Duke Louis I of Liegnitz, in Lubin. Duke Louis, the vassal of the Bohemian king and from mother's side his relative, while from his father's side a member of the branch of the Polish royal Piast dynasty, wanted through this opus to contribute to celebration of his famous ancestor and family. The writer (or even illuminator?) of the manuscript was certain Nicolaus of Prussia (Nycolaus Pruzie).

=== The History of the Codex ===
Duke Louis left the Hedwig Codex to Saint Hedwig in Brzeg, Poland. The manuscript was in Poland for about two-hundred and fifty years. The Hedwig Codex was passed around through Bohemia royalty until its donation to the monastery in the Czech Republic. Upon the Protestant Reformation and the dissolution-secularization of the Brzeg collegiate chapter in 1534, the codex was moved to local gymnasium. During the devastating events of the Thirty Years' War the book was transferred to the town of Ostrov (Schlackenwerth) in western Bohemia (this country and Silesia were part of the same Crown at that time) where was subsequently, after 1671, kept at Piarist monastery.

=== Modern Provenance ===
Two Viennese art dealers obtained the manuscript in 1910 and sold it to philanthropist Rudolph Ritter von Gutmann. In 1938 Nazi authorities in Austria confiscated Gutmanns' art collection, yet the previous owner regained the manuscript in 1947 and passed with it to Canada. For 19 years (1964–83) the manuscript had been returned to Europe again – during that time a facsimile edition, edited by the German art historian Wolfgang Braunfels, was made and published (1972) in Berlin as Der Hedwigs-Codex von 1353. The manuscript was then sold to H.P. Kraus from New York City until it was acquired by the Ludwig Collection located in Cologne. In 1983 the Hedwig Codex was purchased by the J. Paul Getty Trust, Los Angeles.The original manuscript is today part of the Getty Museum collection under the signature Ms. Ludwig XI 7 and has been in thirty-six exhibitions.

== St. Hedwig ==
Hedwig of Silesia married Henry, the future Duke of Silesia, at the age of twelve and had seven children. She did not have much contact with her family, which was common for the upper aristocracy. When she became duchess, she only had contact with one member of her family, her brother Ekbert who was also the bishop-elect of Bamberg, Germany. Hedwig became a widow upon the death of her husband, retreating to the Cistercian nunnery of Trebnitz that she and her husband, Henry, had founded in 1202. Fourteen years later, Hedwig died, Hedwig of Silesia was canonized into a Saint.

It was common for noble widows to retreat to a reputable convent in the medieval period. Even though Hedwig retreated to a convent, she never took vows to enter the order formally, due to the fact that she valued her freedom outside and inside the convent. Hedwig told her daughter Gertrude, who was the abbess of the convent, that she could not be officially bound to the order because she needed to look after the needs of Christ's poor in the world. Hedwig wanted to follow the duties Christ designated to his apostles which in return would grant her eternal life.

By the year 1300 in Silesia, people began referring to Hedwig as patron saint of Silesia. Churches in Poland honored Hedwig by adding a feast day dedicated to her on their ceremonial calendars. Due to the large number of Silesian Catholics, King Fredrick the Great commissioned a church for Hedwig in the year 1740, known as St. Hedwig's Cathedral located in Berlin, Germany.

== Purpose ==
The purpose of the creation of the Hedwig Codex was to celebrate and codify the canonization of Saint Hedwig of Silesia and to claim what was important in her life and sanctity. What interests art historians about the manuscript are its sixty-one tinted drawings which, unlike the text, were originals instead of copies. While the Hedwig Codex details the Saint's life, it does not provide eyewitness statements of the saint, only of the patron. The manuscript is meant to show the marital and penitential life of Saint Hedwig os Silesia. She lived a life of humility that transferred over to the iconography of the manuscript portraying her through maternal imagery. Saint Hedwig of Silesia was perceived as the mother of the poor and a source of comfort for widows and orphans.

== Description ==
=== Design ===
The manuscript has a total of 204 folios. All of the drawings in the Hedwig Codex, with the exception of fol. 9v-12v, are included on single leaves. The material that the manuscript is made out of it red-stained pigskin. The manuscript uses tempera colors and is bounded in between wood boards. Many of the illustrations in the Hedwig Codex have figures on the side to represent witnesses and their appearance also represents the readers. By making the reader a proxy participant, the illustrations in the Hedwig Codex make the legend of Saint Hedwig of Silesia come to life.

=== Text and Script ===
The manuscript has a total of 204 folios, 128 of which are only text. The folios containing only text telling the story of Saint Hedwig of Silesia are known as vita maior and vita minor. The vita maior tells the long life of the Saint while the vita minor is shorter containing prayers, sermons, and about her canonization. The manuscript has a large text script in order to make up for the large size of the manuscript. The manuscript has twenty-four lines on each page which makes it simply legible. Since the manuscript was written by only one scribe, Nycolaus Pruzia, it's an indicator of the conceptual unity of the manuscript.

== Interpretation ==
The Hedwig Codex shows Saint Hedwig of Silesia praying, performing miracles, and giving back to those in need. The manuscript is seen as a symbol of female devotion while also sharing the life of the duchess of Silesia. At the beginning of the manuscript, Hedwig's family tree is depicted in folio 9v and folio 10r, which can be interpreted as a symbol of the political climate the country was enduring. Louis I who commissioned the codex, omitted Anna of Svídnická who was Hedwig's great-great-great-granddaughter and Louis' cousin, as well as St. Elizabeth of Hungary, Hedwig's niece, who was the most famous of the family saints. Since Elizabeth died at an earlier age than Hedwig and had only one daughter as opposed to the seven children Hedwig birthed, Louis I hoped to legitimize himself through Hedwig and prove his direct Piast lineage.

Since its arrival to the J. Paul Getty Museum, art historians, like Jaroslav Folda and Jeffrey Hamburger, have noted that this manuscript is an exemplar of Bohemian book illumination and a testament to woman's religious devotion in the Middle Ages. Jeffrey Hamburger gives an interpretation of the manuscript as evidence of the developing status of art within monastic context.

== Illuminations ==
In fol. 10v of the manuscript, Saint Hedwig is depicted with her family. This folio is anachronistic since the people depicted were already deceased, including Saint Hedwig's parents, making the illustration an impossibility.

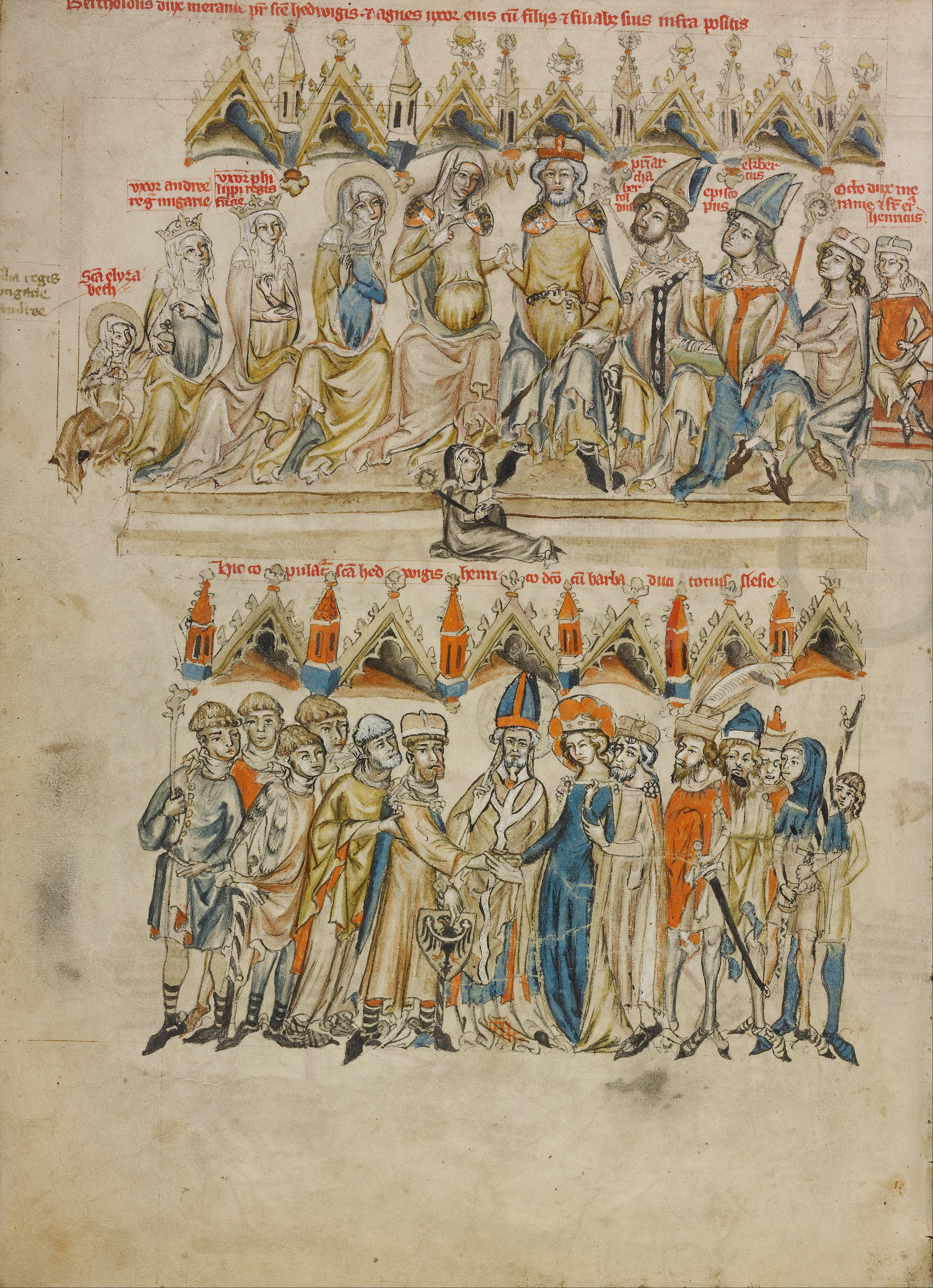
Ms. Ludwig XI 7 (83.MN.126), fol. 10v

The iconography makes the image of Hedwig of Silesia look like a cult image. In fol. 12v, Saint Hedwig appears wearing a grey cloak while clutching the ivory statue of Virgin and child and a pair of shoes on her hands which she carried in case she met someone who was of importance to wear shoes for. A part of Hedwig's legend includes her leaving trails of blood coming from her feet due to her walking barefoot as an imitation of Christ and his apostles and the cold Polish winter. In fol. 12v., Duke Louis I of Liegnitz and his wife Agnes are miniature compared to Hedwig's full-page frontispiece. The ivory statue of Virgin and child that Saint Hedwig is holding in fol. 12v represents her cradling Duke Henry, her deceased son who died fighting the Mongol invaders. Unlike the Virgin Mary, Hedwig is shown without a crown, and instead, is given a red and white halo. Saint Hedwig not having a crown symbolizes her humility.
