= Constance of Wrocław =

Polish-Silesian noblewoman

- Issue: Leszek II the Black: Ziemomysł of Kuyavia

Constance of Wrocław (Polish: Konstancja wrocławska) (c.1221–27 – 21 or 23 February 1257) was a princess of Silesia and the duchess of Kuyavia. She was a member of the Polish House of Piast and mother of Leszek the Black and Ziemomysł of Kuyavia.

== Early life ==
Constance of Wrocław was born in 1227, the second child of Henry II the Pious and his wife Anna of Bohemia, the daughter of Ottokar I of Bohemia and Constance of Hungary. She was named after her maternal grandmother, Constance of Hungary.

Constance and her siblings were brought up away from their parents at the monastery of Trzebnica, where they were cared for by their paternal grandmother Hedwig of Andechs. Hedwig (who was later canonized) greatly influenced the young Constance – she became pious. Later, Hedwig also influenced Constance' son, Leszek.

She was expected to marry soon after coming of age at 12 years, and could do so according to canon law. She married in 1239. At the time only her sister Gertrude was married, to Bolesław I of Masovia. Only one other sister, Elisabeth of Wrocław was to marry, her other sisters becoming abbesses.

Constance was more carefully educated than her future husband, Casimir I of Kuyavia, who was tutored by John Heron, who was later educated by Casimir's parents.

== Marriage ==
In 1239 at Wrocław, Constance married Casimir I of Kuyavia, the second son of Konrad I, Duke of Masovia. In literature there are two theories for the marriage.

The first theory is that Constance's father, Henry, for political reasons wanted a strong alliance with his potential enemy, Konrad I. With Constance's sister Gertrude already married to Konrad's eldest son, her marriage would make a stronger alliance.

The second theory states that Constance's father had internal and external state problems, whereby good relations with the Duke of Mazovia would help greatly, and the marriage of his daughter to the son of the Duke was intended as an effective way to strengthen cooperation. Henry filed a dowry for Constance's marriage to Casimir. This dowry and inheritance of Henry would later cause fighting between Casimir and Bolesław the Pious (1258–1262), ending in Bolesław gaining Greater Poland

Constance's husband, Casimir, was born between 1210 and 1213. He was the second son of Konrad I and Agafia of Rus. He reigned over Kuyavia from 1230 or 1231 after his brother and Gertrude's husband, Bolesław, died. Bolesław, instead of leaving his lands, including Masovia, to Casimir, as stipulated in Konrad's will, passed these to Casimir's younger brother, Siemowit I of Masovia. Casimir had been married once before, to Jadwiga, a Polish noblewoman whose origins are unknown. Casimir and Jadwiga had no children and Jadwiga died childless.

Constance and Casimir had two children:

1. Leszek II the Black (1240-42 – 30 September 1288), Duke of the Fragmentation of Poland
2. Ziemomysł of Kuyavia (1241-45 – 29 October or 24 December 1287), Duke of Kuyavia

== Death ==
The date of death for Constance is disputed. With regard to the year, she is last noted as a living person in a document dated 25 May 1252, whereas the first document indicating her death is from 3 May 1257. As far as the day and month, Nekrolog strzeleński reported that she died on 21 February, but, according to Nekrologu opactwa św. Wincentego we Wrocławiu (en: obituary from the Abbey of St. Vincent in Wrocław), her death occurred on 23 February. Thus, she is considered to have died on 21 or 23 February between 1253 and 1257. Due to the fact that the only three mentions of her death in the documents of Casimir I were from 1257 (3 May, 16 September, and 10 November), it is considered highly likely that she died earlier that year. Constance's burial place is unknown.

The document from 16 September 1257 was issued by her two sons and Casimir to the Bishop of Chełmno. Her sons wanted to have daily Mass celebrated for Constance's soul.

== Ancestry ==
Ancestors of Constance of Wrocław

16. Władysław II the Exile
8. Bolesław I the Tall
17. Agnes of Babenberg
4. Henry I the Bearded
18. ?
9. Christina
19. ?
2. Henry II the Pious
20. Berthold I of Istria
10. Berthold IV, Duke of Merania
21. Hedwig of Wittelsbach
5. Hedwig of Andechs
22. Dedi III, Margrave of Lusatia
11. Agnes of Rochlitz
23. Matilda of Heinsberg
1. Constance of Wrocław
24. Vladislaus I, Duke of Bohemia
12. Vladislav II of Bohemia
25. Richeza of Berg
6. Ottakar I of Bohemia
26. Louis I, Landgrave of Thuringia
13. Judith of Thuringia
27. Hedwig of Gudensberg
3. Anna of Bohemia
28. Géza II of Hungary
14. Béla III of Hungary
29. Euphrosyne of Kiev
7. Constance of Hungary
30. Raynald of Châtillon
15. Agnes of Antioch
31. Constance of Antioch
