= Konrad the Curly =

- Coat-of-arms of Silesian Piasts.
- Born: c. 1198
- Died: 4 September 1213; Czerwony Kosciol
- Noble family: Silesian Piasts
- Father: Henry I the Bearded
- Mother: Saint Hedwig of Andechs

Konrad the Curly (Polish: Konrad Kędzierzawy; c. 1198 – 4 September 1213), was a Polish prince member of the Piast dynasty in his Silesian branch.

He was the third son of Henry I the Bearded, Duke of Wrocław, by his wife (and later Saint) Hedwig, daughter of Berthold IV, Duke of Merania.

== Life ==
Little is known about his early years. The death of his older brother Bolesław in 1208 left him in the second place over the Silesian inheritance, after his brother and new heir Henry II the Pious. He died very young after a fall from his horse during a hunt and was buried in Trebnitz, where his sister Gertrude was the Abbess.

Prince Konrad was the hero of the first alleged ethnic conflict between the Polish and Germans in Silesia. According to an anonymous Silesian monk, the author of the "Polish-Silesian Chronicle" from the turn of the 13th and 14th centuries, Henry I the Bearded tried to leave all his inheritance to Henry II the Pious. This led in a quarrel between the brothers, which degenerated in an open conflict with the passive attitude of their parents. In this dispute, the young Konrad had the support of the Polish, and Henry II gained the favour of the Germans. As a result, both forces clashed in the Battle of Studnica near Opole in 1213, the Germans under the leadership of Henry II defeated the Polish troops of Konrad. The chronicles suggest that Konrad's fatal accident shortly after wasn't coincidental.

Thanks to this information, by the 19th and early 20th century, Prince Konrad became a Polish national hero. Historiography recognized the Battle of Studnica as a breakthrough event for Polish Silesia. The Silesian writer Jan Mikołaj Jaroń created a 1920 drama with the title Konrad the Curly. In 1928, Leon Schiller developed the Silesian Drama at the beginning of the 13th century in five acts. As a defender of the Prince, Zofia Kossak-Szczucka wrote Legnickie Pole in 1931. Konrad's brother and antagonist, Henry II the Pious, was recognized as pro-German.
