= Mieszko of Lubusz =

Mieszko
- Coat-of-arms of Silesian-Piasts.

Duke of Lubusz
- Reign: 1241–1242
- Born: c. 1223/27
- Died: 1242
- Burial: St Peter's Church, Lubusz
- House: Silesian Piasts
- Father: Henry II the Pious
- Mother: Anne of Bohemia

Mieszko of Lubusz (Polish: Mieszko lubuski; c. 1223/27 – 1242), a member of the Silesian Piasts, was Duke of Lubusz from 1241 until his death.

== Life ==
Mieszko was the second son of the Silesian duke Henry II the Pious (1196–1241), by his consort Anne (d. 1265), a daughter of the Přemyslid king Ottokar I of Bohemia. His father succeeded as Polish high duke in 1238, ruling over Silesia and the Seniorate Province, as well as over large parts of Greater Poland. He had to ward off several attacks by the Ascanian margraves of Brandenburg and the Magdeburg archbishops on the westernmost Greater Polish lands, stretching around the former Veleti castle of Lubusz on the banks of the Oder river.

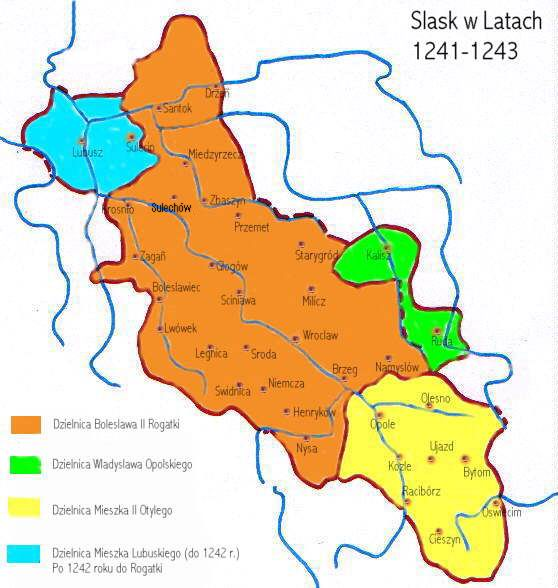
Silesian duchies in 1241–1243, Mieszko's Duchy of Lubusz in blue

When on 9 April 1241 High Duke Henry II was defeated and killed in the Mongol invasion of Poland at the Battle of Legnica, Mieszko and his older brother Bolesław II the Bald were old enough to be considered adults according to the Piast family customs. As contemporary chroniclers called Mieszko with the surname "of Lubusz" (lubuski), it seems possible that his older brother Bolesław, while assuming the rule over Silesia, had to cede him the Greater Polish territories of Lubusz as a separate district, probably by the will of their late father.

This agreement was only effected on a preliminary basis until the younger brothers Henry III the White and Konrad I attained the age of majority. Mieszko, however, was already dead by the beginning of 1242 and was buried in St. Peter's Church below Lubusz Castle. He never married or had children. Shortly afterwards, in 1248/49, Lubusz Land was pledged to the Archbishops of Magdeburg and the Brandenburg margraves by his brother Bolesław II.
