= Ladislaus of Salzburg =

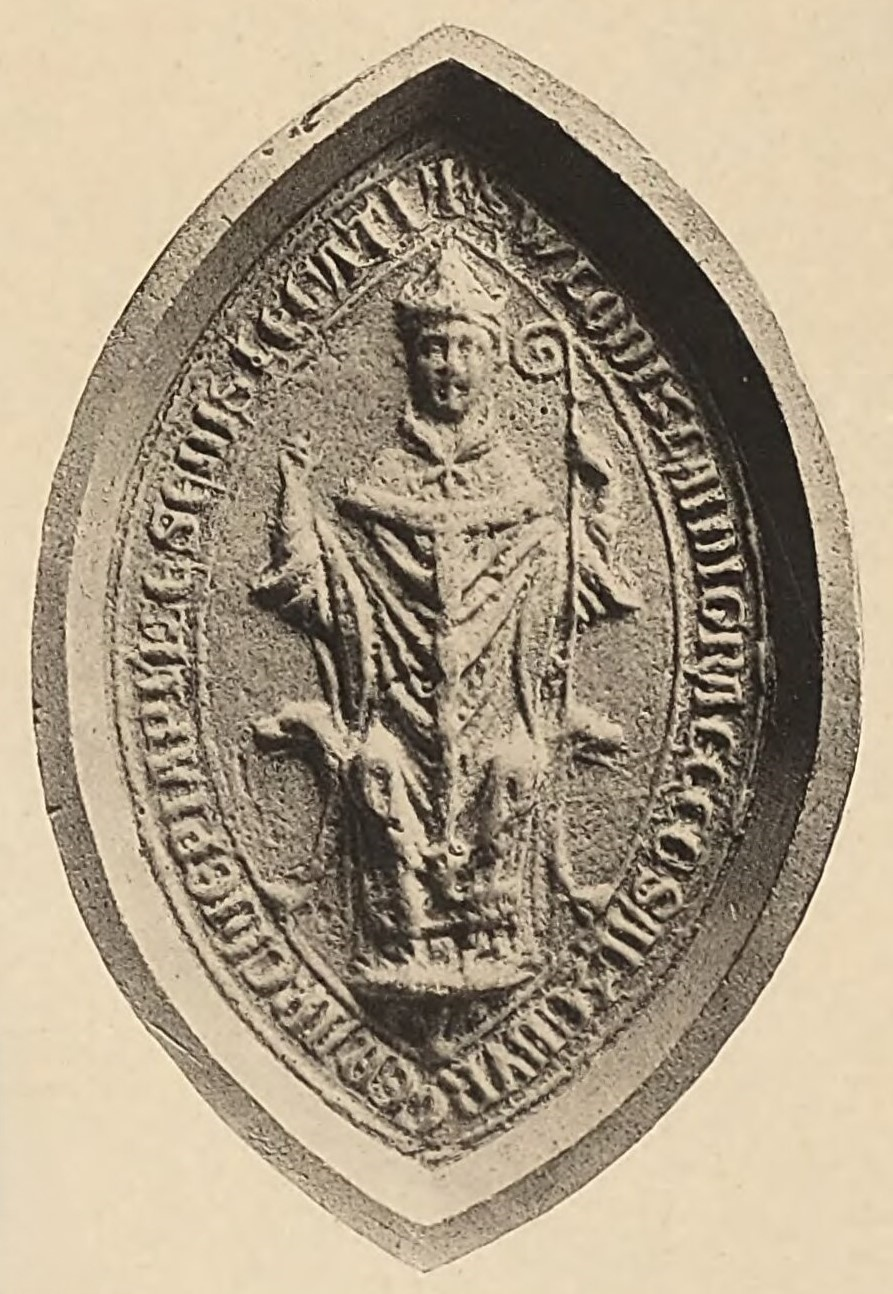
- Seal from 1257

Duke of Wrocław
- Reign: 1248–1270
- Predecessor: Bolesław II the Horned
- Successor: Henryk IV Probus

Prince-Bishop of Salzburg
- Reign: 1265–1270
- Predecessor: Ulrich von Seckau
- Successor: Friedrich II. von Walchen
- Born: c. 1237
- Died: 27 April 1270; Salzburg
- Burial: Salzburg Cathedral
- House: Piast
- Father: Henry II the Pious
- Mother: Anna of Bohemia
- Religion: Catholic

Ladislaus of Salzburg, also known as Władysław of Wrocław (Polish: Władysław Wrocławski) or Władysław of Silesia (German: Wladislaus von Schlesien, Czech: Vladislav Slezský; c. 1237 – 27 April 1270), a member of the Silesian Piasts, was co-ruler in the Duchy of Wrocław since 1248. He served as chancellor of King Ottokar II of Bohemia from 1255 and was elected Bishop of Bamberg in 1257 and Bishop of Passau in 1265. Władysław became Prince-Archbishop of Salzburg in the same year, and from 1268 also served as administrator of the Wrocław diocese.

== Family ==
Władysław was the fifth and youngest son of the Polish Duke Henry II the Pious, by his wife Anna, daughter of the Přemyslid king Ottokar I of Bohemia. He was a member of the Silesian Piasts, elder line of the Polish ruling Piast dynasty. Władysław's grandfather, Duke Henry the Bearded, also regained the Seniorate Province and the Polish throne as High Duke in 1232.

Duke Henry II became co-ruler of his father in 1226 and was able to succeed him as Silesian duke and High Duke of Poland in 1238. When he was killed during the first Mongol invasion of Poland in the Battle of Legnica on 9 April 1241, Władysław's eldest brother Bolesław II the Bald assumed the rule over the Lower Silesian lands and the guardianship of his minor siblings. Stuck in internal conflicts with his brothers Henry III the White and Mieszko, he was not able to secure the Polish throne, which he had to cede to his Piast cousin Konrad of Masovia.

== Life ==
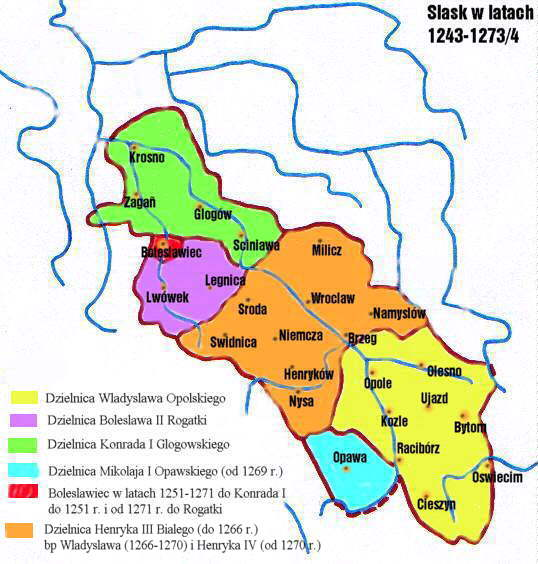
Silesia in 1248–51: Creation of the Lower Silesian duchies of Legnica (violet) and Głogów (green)

With the approval of their mother Anna of Bohemia and with the purpose to not further divide the paternal lands, the younger sons of late Henry II, Władysław and Konrad I, were sent to study at the Italian university of Padua, with the idea that both prepare for an ecclesiastical career. In 1248, their rivalling elder brothers Henry III and Bolesław II finally came to terms: Henry assumed the government over the Lower Silesian lands around Wrocław, after he made a land division with Bolesław II. He chose Władysław as co-ruler, while Konrad I supposedly became co-ruler in the newly established Duchy of Legnica under Bolesław. However, the Duke of Legnica refused to share the power with anybody. Konrad fled to Greater Poland and, backed by his brother-in-law Duke Przemysł I, eventually obtained the Duchy of Głogów as his own share in 1251.

In the case of Henry III and Władysław, the cooperation between the brothers was a mutual agreement with few opportunities to frictions, as Władysław mainly stayed in the Bohemian capital Prague at the court of his maternal cousin King Ottokar II. His role in the undivided Duchy of Wrocław was limited to receive his rents; Henry III took under his hands all the government. Nevertheless, Władysław too issued numerous deeds and in 1261 he and his brother jointly vested the Wrocław citizens with Magdeburg rights. With the support of the Bohemian king, Władysław continued his spiritual career: about 1255 he became a provost at the cathedral chapter of the St Peter and Paul collegiate church in Vyšehrad (today a part of Prague) and thus was appointed Bohemian Royal Chancellor, a post exclusively reserved for the Vyšehrad provosts. The close alliance between the Silesian Piasts and the Přemyslid dynasty strengthened the ties between the lands of Silesia and Bohemia.

Władysław joined the cathedral chapter in Bamberg in 1256 and was elected bishop in the following year, however, he had to resign, as he received no dispensation by Pope Alexander IV due to his young age. Backed by King Ottokar II, he became a member of the Wrocław chapter and in April 1265 he was elected Bishop of Passau. In October he was elected Archbishop of Salzburg; this time he received the consent of Pope Clement IV. Władysław arrived in Salzburg in Spring 1266. He had to return to Silesia upon the death of his brother Duke Henry III the White on 3 December 1266. In his will, he left Władysław the guardianship of his infant son Henry IV Probus and with this, the regency of the whole Silesian duchy of Wrocław.

Henry III's government had not been too beneficial to the church; Władysław, now as a bishop and also regent, was not inclined to preserve the prerogatives of the nobility, but at the end he was forced to accept this. The bishop-regent was an advocate, with his late brother Henry III, for the canonization of their paternal grandmother, Duchess Hedwig of Silesia (née of Andechs). The process was finally completed, when Saint Hedwig was canonized by Pope Clement on 26 March 1267. This was certainly Władysław's great personal success and gave much prestige to the whole family.

The final chord of his great church's career was his nomination in 1268 to the Bishopric of Wrocław. Władysław had no intention to sacrifice the Archbishopric of Salzburg, but thanks to his influence in Prague and Rome he was appointed an apostolic administrator with all the rights of a bishop. Władysław fulfilled all his duties honestly, a quite uncommon attitude among the medieval princes. When he was Archbishop of Salzburg and shortly afterwards received the title of an administrator in the Diocese of Wroclaw, he was able to combine the two positions so that no one can say that these features overwhelm them. The last four years of life he was in constant travels between Salzburg and Wrocław.

Władysław died on 27 April 1270 and was buried in Salzburg Cathedral. In his will, he left his rights over the half of the Duchy of Wrocław to his nephew Henry IV Probus. There were some rumours that the cause of death of the young bishop, with not more than thirty-three years, was poisoning. Guilty of this crime have to be among the nobility, who four years earlier apparently killed Duke Henry III the White, and almost twenty years later his nephew Henry IV shared the same fate. The mere fact of mentioning the same source (the Chronicle of the Silesian Piast Dukes and his likes) stated that the subsequent death of the Dukes of Wrocław in a short term appears to be somewhat suspect. Likely source of sensational suit has gone, but few credible rumors. The sudden death of a young prince caused by natural factors in the time, when the medical service was not the best, could easily be interpreted as a poisoning. Władysław's death was likely, however, natural, which indicates the presumable place of his death, Salzburg. If the Polish nobles actually wanted to kill him, they presumably would have made this when he stayed in Wrocław and may not have chosen a long journey to Germany to eliminate the bishop-regent.

== Sources ==
- "Henryk III Biały" ("Henryk III the White"), Encyklopedia Polski (Encyclopedia of Poland), Kraków, Wydawnictwo Ryszard Kluszczyński, 1996, p. 216.
- This article was translated from his original in Polish Wikipedia.
- Marek, Miroslav. "Complete Genealogy of the House of Piast: Silesia-Wroclaw". Genealogy.EU.
- Chronological Dates in Stoyan

Ladislaus of Salzburg Piast Dynasty Born: c. 1237 Died: 27 April 1270
Regnal titles
Preceded by Bolesław II the Bald	Duke of Wrocław; 1248–1270 with Henry III the White (1248–1266); Henry IV Probus (1266–1290)	Succeeded by Henry IV Probus
Catholic Church titles
Regnal titles
Preceded by Henry I	Prince-Bishop of Bamberg only elect: too young, therefore not papally confirmed 1257	Succeeded by Bertold of Leiningen
Preceded by Otto of Lonsdorf	Prince-Bishop of Passau only elect: succeeded to Salzburg see 1265	Succeeded by Petrus
Catholic Church titles
Preceded by Ulrich of Seckau	Archbishop of Salzburg papally dispensed though too young and lacking Holy Orders; 1265–1270	Succeeded by Frederick II
Preceded by Thomas I	Bishop of Wrocław as administrator 1268–1270	Succeeded by Thomas II Zaremba
