= Anne of Bohemia, Duchess of Silesia =

Anne of Bohemia
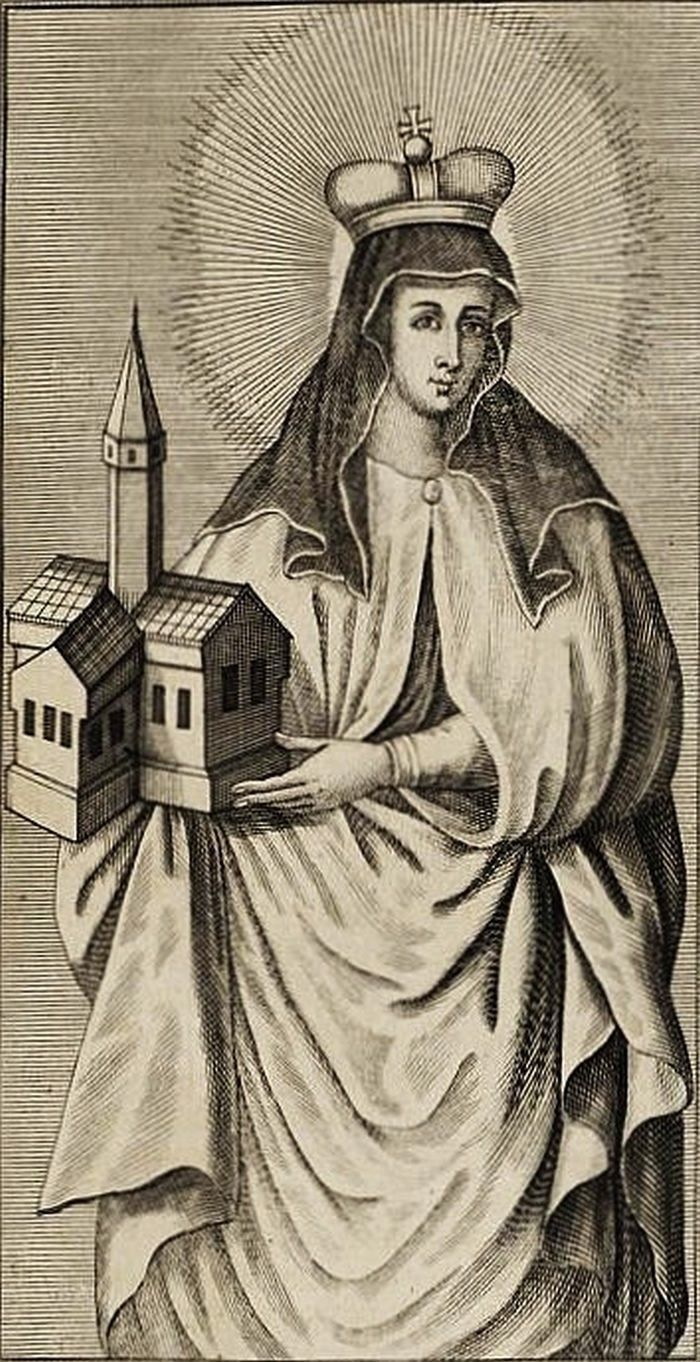

High Duchess consort of Poland
- Tenure: 1238–1241

Duchess of Silesia
- Tenure: 1238–1252
- Born: 1203/1204
- Died: 26 June 1265 (aged 60–61)
- Spouse: Henry II the Pious
- Issue: Constance, Duchess of Kuyavia; Bolesław II the Bald; Mieszko, Duke of Lubusz; Henry III the White; Konrad I, Duke of Silesia-Glogau; Elisabeth, Duchess of Greater Poland; Ladislaus of Salzburg
- Dynasty: Přemyslid
- Father: Ottokar I of Bohemia
- Mother: Constance of Hungary

Anne of Bohemia (Czech: Anna Lehnická, Polish: Anna Przemyślidka; c. 1203/1204 – 26 June 1265), a member of the Přemyslid dynasty, was Duchess of Silesia (Note: Anne was still styled as a duchess after her husband's death in 1241.) and High Duchess of Poland from 1238 to 1241, by her marriage to the Piast ruler Henry II the Pious. She was celebrated by the community of Franciscan nuns at St Clara of Prague Abbey in Wrocław as their founder and patron.

== Life ==
Anna was probably born in Prague, Bohemia, the daughter of King Ottokar I of Bohemia and his second wife, Constance of Hungary. Her maternal grandparents were Béla III of Hungary and his first wife, Agnes of Antioch. Her paternal grandparents were King Vladislaus II of Bohemia and Judith of Thuringia. She was a sister of the Franciscan nun Agnes of Bohemia (1211–1282).

Around the age of twelve (in 1216) she was married to the Piast prince Henry II the Pious, member of the Silesian branch of the Piast dynasty, the son and heir of Duke Henry the Bearded. During internal political struggles, the Silesian Piasts gained large parts of the Polish territories upon the assassination of High Duke Leszek the White in 1227. Henry the Bearded inherited the Duchy of Greater Poland in 1231, and in the following year attained the Seniorate Province and the Polish throne at Kraków. After his death on 19 March 1238 he was succeeded by his son Henry II, co-ruler in the Silesian lands since 1226.

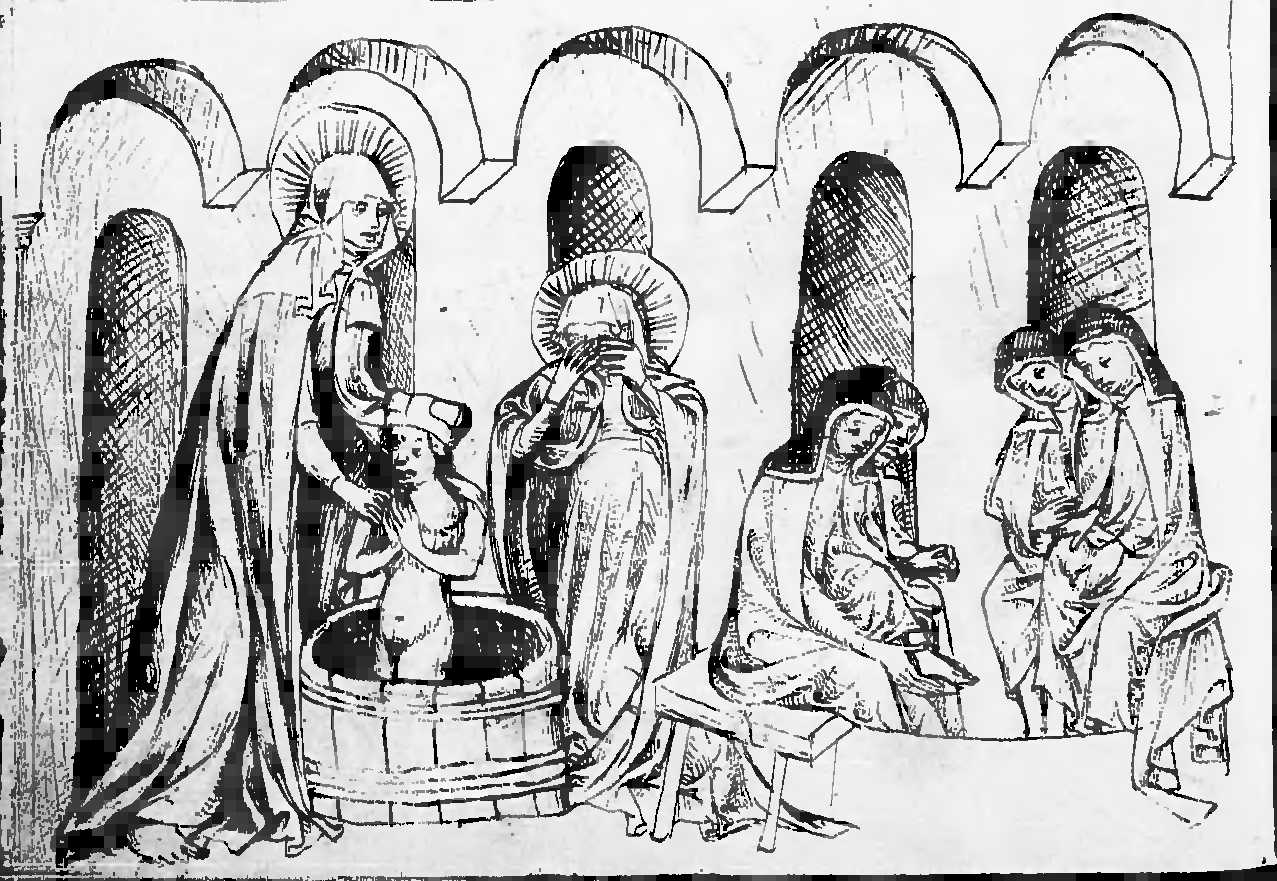
Hedwig of Andechs baptizing her grandson Bolesław II; Anne of Bohemia attending

Anne was widowed only three years later, on 9 April 1241, when her husband was killed fighting against the Mongols at the Battle of Legnica. The following years were mainly marked by her occupation as a regent for her son Bolesław II and his brothers. Nevertheless, the Silesian Piasts were not able to maintain their supremacy in the Polish lands, when the Kraków throne passed to Duke Konrad I of Masovia.

On 8 May 1242, Anne and her son founded the Benedictine abbey of Krzeszów (Grüssau). The Dowager Duchess also was a generous benefactor of the Franciscan nuns in Wrocław, in consultation with her sister Agnes of Bohemia. In 1256 Pope Alexander IV wrote to the bishops of Wrocław and Lebus, explaining that Anne had proposed the construction of a monastery that would house a community of Franciscan nuns, fulfilling her desire, and her dead husband's desire, to build such an institution. In 1257, the construction of the monastery began. Anne donated many goods to the monastery, but made sure that her donations did not violate the vow of voluntary poverty that the nuns had taken; in 1263, a papal bull issued by Pope Urban IV to the nuns at Wrocław states that Anne wanted the nuns to use the property that she had given them only in times of need. The Notæ Monialium Sanctæ Claræ Wratislaviensium names her as the founder of the monastery of St Clare at Wrocław. Her vita, written in the first half of the fourteenth century, links her closely with her mother-in-law Hedwig of Andechs, who is portrayed as the main influence on Anne's religious life.

According to a text known as the Notæ Monialium Sanctæ Claræ Wratislaviensium, a chronicle written by the Franciscan nuns at Wrocław, Anne died in 1265 and was buried in the nuns' choir at the Chapel of St Hedwig, a chapel in St Clara of Prague Abbey in Wrocław.

According to historian Gábor Klaniczay, she was venerated as a saint in Poland, but would never be canonised.

== Children ==
Anna and Henry had ten children:

1. Gertrude (c. 1218/20 – 23/30 April 1247), married by 1232 to Bolesław I of Masovia.
2. Constance (c. 1221 – c. 21 February 1257), married by 1239 to Casimir I of Kuyavia.
3. Bolesław II the Bald (c. 1220/25 – 25/31 December 1278).
4. Mieszko (c. 1223/27 – 1242).
5. Henry III the White (1227/30 – 3 December 1266).
6. Konrad of Głogów (1228/31 – 6 August c. 1274).
7. Elizabeth (c. 1232 – 16 January 1265), married in 1244 to Przemysł I of Greater Poland.
8. Agnes of Trebnitz (c. 1236 – 14 May aft. 1277), left by her mother with the Franciscans at St. Clare in Wrocław.
9. Władysław (1237 – 27 April 1270), Bohemian chancellor, Prince-bishop of Bamberg and Passau, Prince-archbishop of Salzburg.
10. Hedwig (c. 1238/41 – 3 April 1318), Abbess of St Clara in Wrocław.

After lengthy dynastical struggles, Anne's younger sons claimed their rights to the Lower Silesian lands, including Henry III, who after a 1248 partition of the Silesian lands ruled as Duke of Silesia at Wrocław, while Bolesław II went on ti rule as Duke of Legnica. From 1251, Konrad I ruled as first Silesian Duke of Głogów. Anne's son Władysław (Ladislaus; 1237–1270) was appointed chancellor by King Ottokar II of Bohemia in 1256, he was elected Prince-bishop of Bamberg (1257) and Passau, and became Prince-archbishop of Salzburg in 1265. Of her daughters, Gertrude (1219–1246) became the first wife of Boleslav I, duke of Masovia, whilst Hedwig (c. 1240–1318) served as abbess of the monastery of St Clare at Wrocław.

== Sources ==
- Jordan, William Chester; McNab, Bruce; Ruiz, Teofilo F. (2015). Order and Innovation in the Middle Ages: Essays in Honor of Joseph R. Strayer. Princeton University Press. ISBN 978-1400869671.
- Klaniczay, Gábor (2002). Holy Rulers and Blessed Princesses: Dynastic Cults in Medieval Central Europe. Cambridge: Cambridge University Press. ISBN 978-0521420181.
- Rossignol, Sébastien (2014). "The Authority and Charter Usage of Female Rulers in Medieval Silesia, c. 1200-c. 1330". The Journal of Medieval History. 40 (1 (Jan)): 63–84.

Anne of Bohemia, Duchess of Silesia House of Přemysl Born: 1204 Died: 26 June 1265
Royal titles
Preceded by Hedwig of Andechs	High Duchess consort of Poland; 1238–1241	Succeeded by Agafia of Rus
