= Hedwig of Silesia =

High Duchess consort of Poland

Saint Hedwig of Silesia
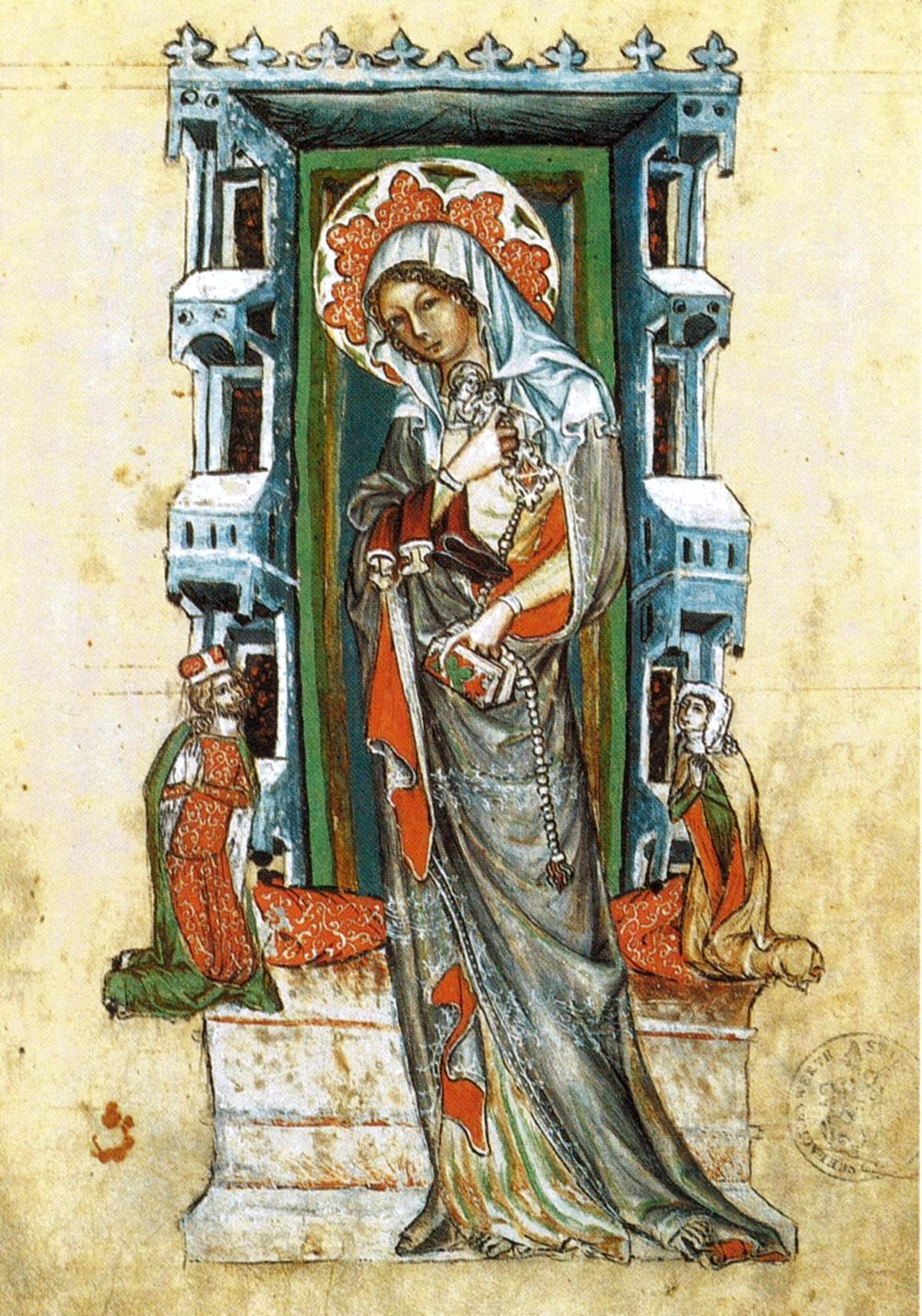
- Saint Hedwig of Silesia with Duke Louis I of Brzeg and Duchess Agnés, Hedwig Codex, Lubin, 1353 (now in the J. Paul Getty Museum, California)
- Born: 1174; Andechs, Bavaria, Holy Roman Empire
- Died: 15 October 1243 (aged 68–69); Trzebnica Abbey, Silesia, Kingdom of Poland
- Venerated in: Catholic Church
- Canonized: 26 March 1267 by Pope Clement IV
- Major shrine: Andechs Abbey and St. Hedwig's Cathedral in Berlin
- Feast: 16 October; moved to 20 October in Canada
- Attributes: holding a church or a pair of shoes in her hands
- Patronage: Andechs Abbey, Brandenburg, Dioceses of Berlin and Görlitz, Kraków, Poland, Silesia, its capital Wrocław, Trzebnica, orphans

Hedwig of Silesia (also Hedwig of Andechs, German: Heilige Hedwig von Andechs, Polish: Jadwiga Śląska, Latin: Hedvigis; 1174 – 15 October 1243), a member of the Bavarian comital House of Andechs, was Duchess of Silesia from 1201 and of Greater Poland from 1231 as well as High Duchess consort of Poland from 1232 until 1238. She was canonized by the Catholic Church in 1267 by Pope Clement IV.

== Life ==
The daughter of Count Berthold IV of Andechs, margrave of Carniola and Istria and his second wife Agnes of Wettin, she was born at Andechs Castle in the Duchy of Bavaria. Her elder sister, Agnes, married King Philip II of France (annulled in 1200) and her sister Gertrude (killed in 1213) married King Andrew II of Hungary, while the youngest Matilda, (Mechtild) became abbess at the Benedictine Abbey of Kitzingen in Franconia, where Hedwig also received her education. Hedwig's brother was Bishop Ekbert of Bamberg, Count of Andechs-Meranien. Another brother was Berthold, Archbishop of Kalocsa and Patriarch of Aquileia, while her brother Henry, Margrave of Istria was the first lord of Carniola.

Through her sister Gertrude, she was the aunt of Elizabeth of Hungary.

=== Duchess consort ===
At the age of twelve, Hedwig married Henry I the Bearded, son and heir of the Piast duke Boleslaus the Tall of Silesia. As soon as Henry succeeded his father in 1201, he had to struggle with his Piast relatives, at first with his uncle Duke Mieszko IV Tanglefoot who immediately seized the Upper Silesian Duchy of Opole. In 1206 Henry and his cousin Duke Władysław III Spindleshanks of Greater Poland agreed to swap the Silesian Lubusz Land for the Kalisz region, which met with fierce protest by Władysław's III nephew Władysław Odonic. When Henry went to Gąsawa in 1227 to meet his Piast cousins, he narrowly saved his life, while High Duke Leszek I the White was killed by the men of the Pomerelian Duke Świętopełk II, instigated by Władysław Odonic.

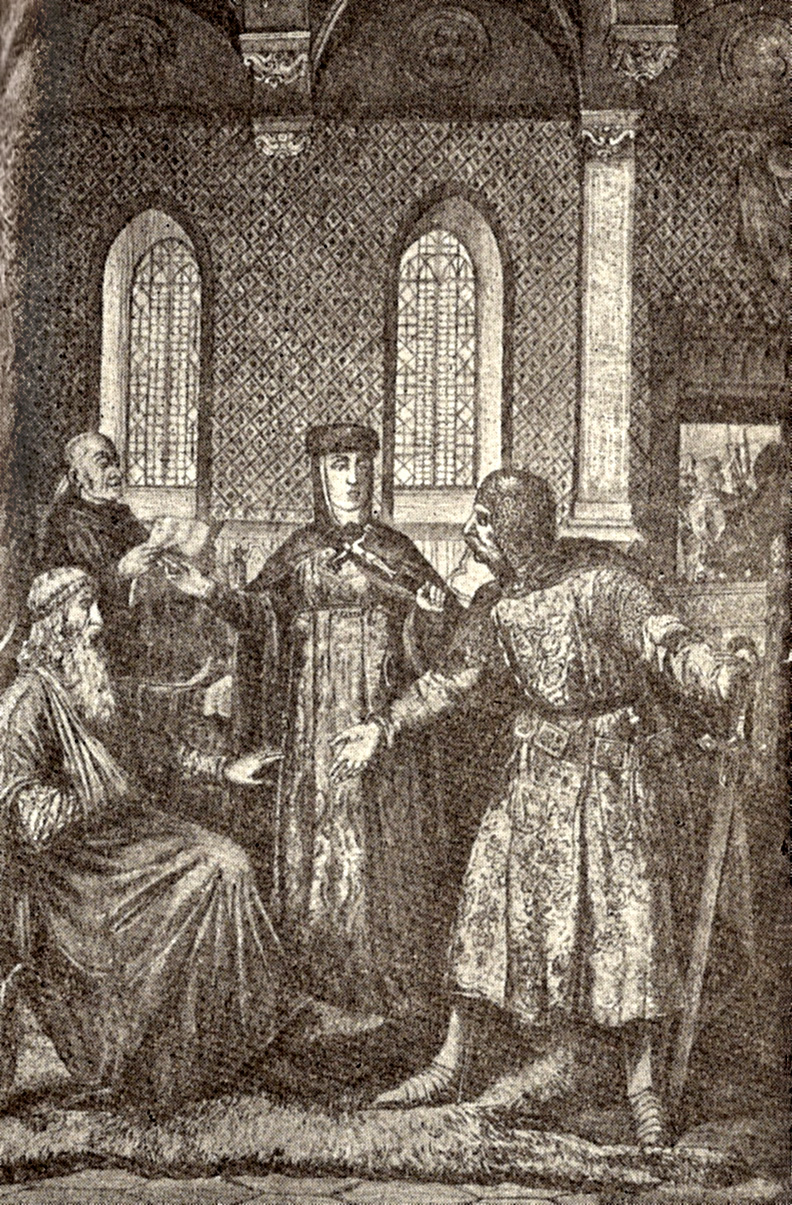
Hedwig intercedes between Henry and Konrad, 19th century depiction

The next year Henry's ally Władysław III Spindleshanks succeeded Leszek I as High Duke; however as he was still contested by his nephew in Greater Poland, he made Henry his governor at Kraków, whereby the Silesian duke once again became entangled in the dispute over the Seniorate Province. In 1229 he was captured and arrested at Płock Castle by rivaling Duke Konrad I of Masovia. Hedwig proceeded to Płock pleading for Henry and was able to have him released.

Her actions promoted the reign of her husband: upon the death of the Polish High Duke Władysław III Spindleshanks in 1231, Henry also became Duke of Greater Poland and the next year prevailed as High Duke at Kraków. He thereby was the first of the Silesian Piast descendants of Władysław II the Exile to gain the rule over Silesia and the Seniorate Province in accord with the 1138 Testament of Bolesław III Wrymouth.

=== Widow ===
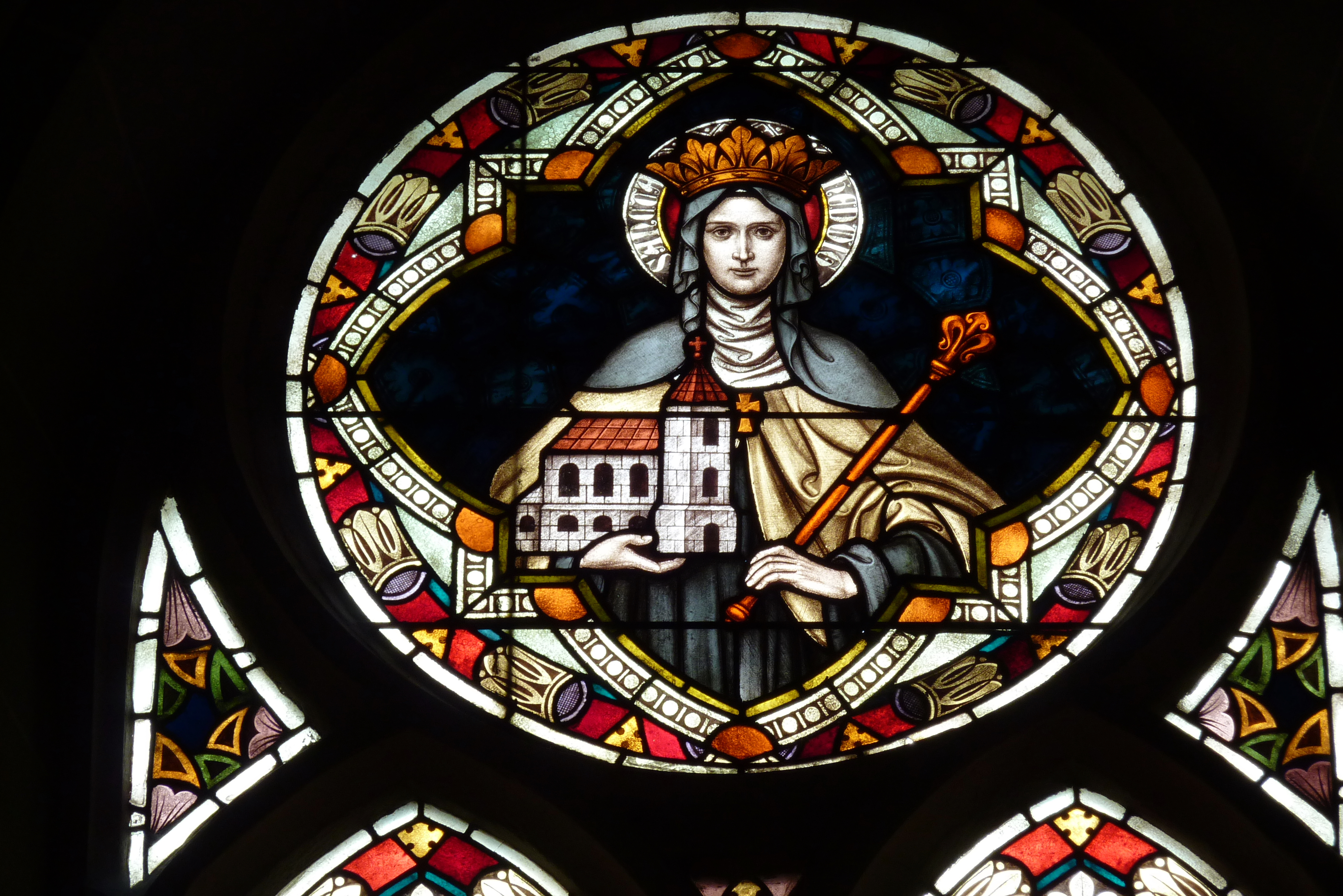
Stained glass at St. Servatius Church, Landkern

Upon his death in 1238, Henry was buried at a Cistercian monastery of nuns, Trzebnica Abbey, which he had established in 1202 at Hedwig's request. Hedwig accepted the death of her beloved husband with faith. She said:

"Would you oppose the will of God? Our lives are His."

The widow moved into the monastery, which was led by her daughter Gertrude, assuming the religious habit of a lay sister, but she did not take vows. She invited numerous German religious people from the Holy Roman Empire into the Silesian lands, as well as German settlers who founded numerous cities, towns and villages in the course of the Ostsiedlung, while cultivating barren parts of Silesia for agriculture.

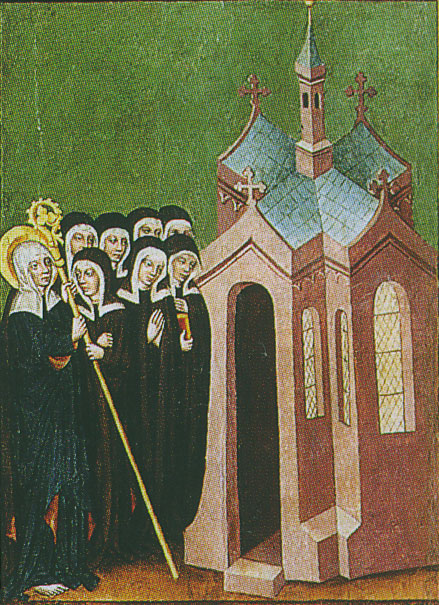
Scene from an altar of St. Hedwig of Silesia, Wrocław, around 1430, restored in 1929, National Museum, Warsaw

Hedwig and Henry had several daughters, though only one surviving son, Henry II the Pious, who succeeded his father as Duke of Silesia and Polish High Duke. The widow, however, had to witness the killing of her son, vainly awaiting the support of Emperor Frederick II, during the first Mongol invasion of Poland at the Battle of Legnica in 1241. The hopes for a re-united Poland were lost, and even Silesia fragmented into numerous Piast duchies under Henry II's sons. Hedwig and her daughter-in-law, Henry II's widow Anna of Bohemia, established a Benedictine abbey at the site of the battle in Legnickie Pole, settled with monks coming from Opatovice in Bohemia.

Hedwig and Henry had lived very pious lives, and Hedwig had great zeal for her faith. She had supported her husband in donating the Augustinian provostry at Nowogród Bobrzański and the commandery of the Knights Templar at Oleśnica Mała. Hedwig always helped the poor, the widows and the orphans, founded several hospitals for the sick and the lepers and donated all her fortune to the Church. She allowed no one to leave her uncomforted, and one time she spent ten weeks teaching the Our Father to a poor woman. According to legend, she went barefoot even in winter, and when she was urged by the Bishop of Wrocław to wear shoes, she carried them in her hands. On 15 October 1243, Hedwig died and was buried in Trzebnica Abbey with her husband, while relics of her are preserved at Andechs Abbey and St. Hedwig's Cathedral in Berlin.

== Veneration ==
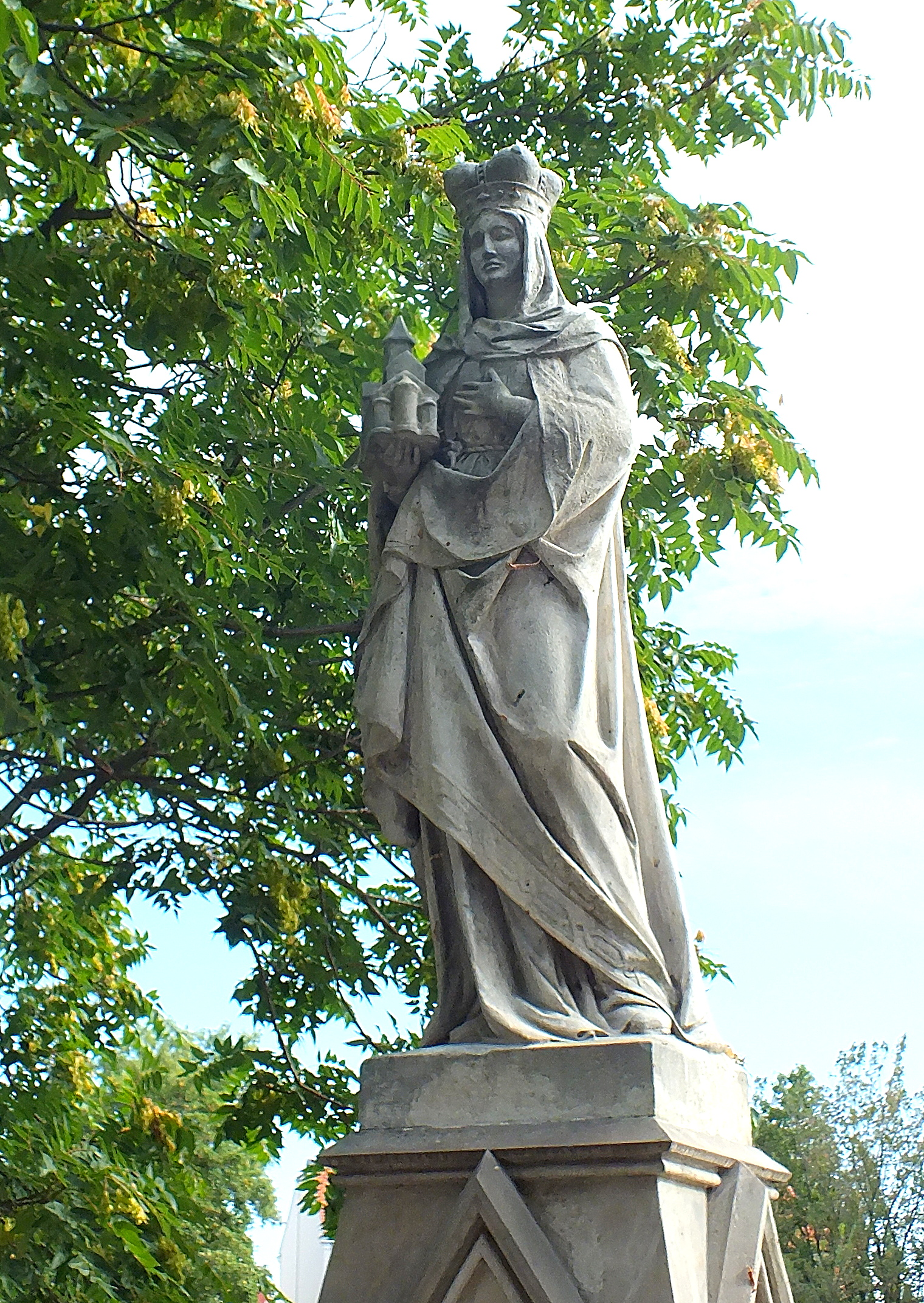
Monument in Wrocław

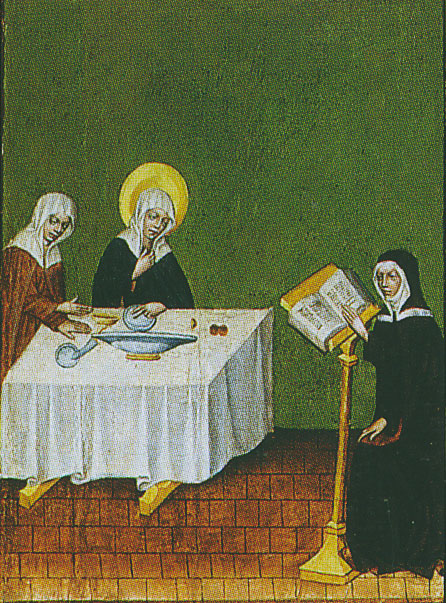
Scene XXV from the Altar of Saint Hedwig

Hedwig was canonized in 1267 by Pope Clement IV, a supporter of the Cistercian order, at the suggestion of her grandson Prince-Archbishop Władysław of Salzburg. She is the patroness saint of Silesia, of Andechs, and of the Roman Catholic Archdiocese of Wrocław and the Roman Catholic Diocese of Görlitz. Her feast day is celebrated on the General Roman Calendar on 16 October. The Order of Saint Paul the First Hermit, who count her as a great benefactor, celebrate it on 8 June. A 17th-century legend has it that Hedwig, while on a pilgrimage to Rome, stopped at Bad Zell in Austria, where she had healing waters spring up at a source which today still bears her name.

In 1773 the Prussian king Frederick the Great, having conquered and annexed the bulk of Silesia in the First Silesian War, had St. Hedwig in Berlin built for the Catholic Upper Silesian immigrants, since 1930 the cathedral of the Roman Catholic Archdiocese of Berlin. After the expulsion of almost all Germans from Silesia, German Silesians carried Hedwig's veneration to all over remaining Germany.

In March 2020 the discovery of Hedwig's remains, that had been missing for centuries, was reported. The remains were found in her sanctuary in Trzebnica, in a silver casket bearing a lead tablet with an inscription confirming Hedwig's identity.

Hedwig glasses are named after Hedwig of Silesia.

== Children ==
Hedwig and Henry I had seven children:

1. Agnes (ca. 1190 – before 11 May 1214).
2. Bolesław (ca. 1191 – 10 September 1206/08).
3. Henry II the Pious (ca. 1196 – killed in Battle of Legnica, 9 April 1241).
4. Konrad the Curly (ca. 1198 – Czerwony Kosciol, 4 September 1213).
5. Sophie (ca. 1200 – before 22/23 March 1214).
6. Gertrude (ca. 1200 – Trebnitz, 6/30 December 1268), Abbess of Trebnitz.
7. A son [Władysław?] (before 25 December 1208 – 1214/17).

== Gallery ==
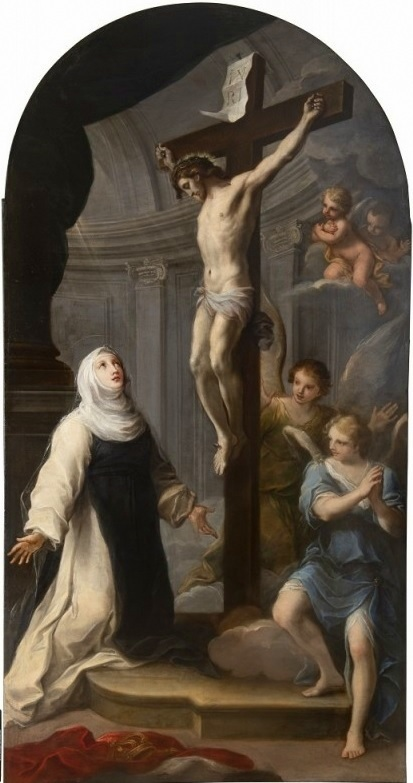
Saint Hedwig of Silesia under the Cross by Szymon Czechowicz

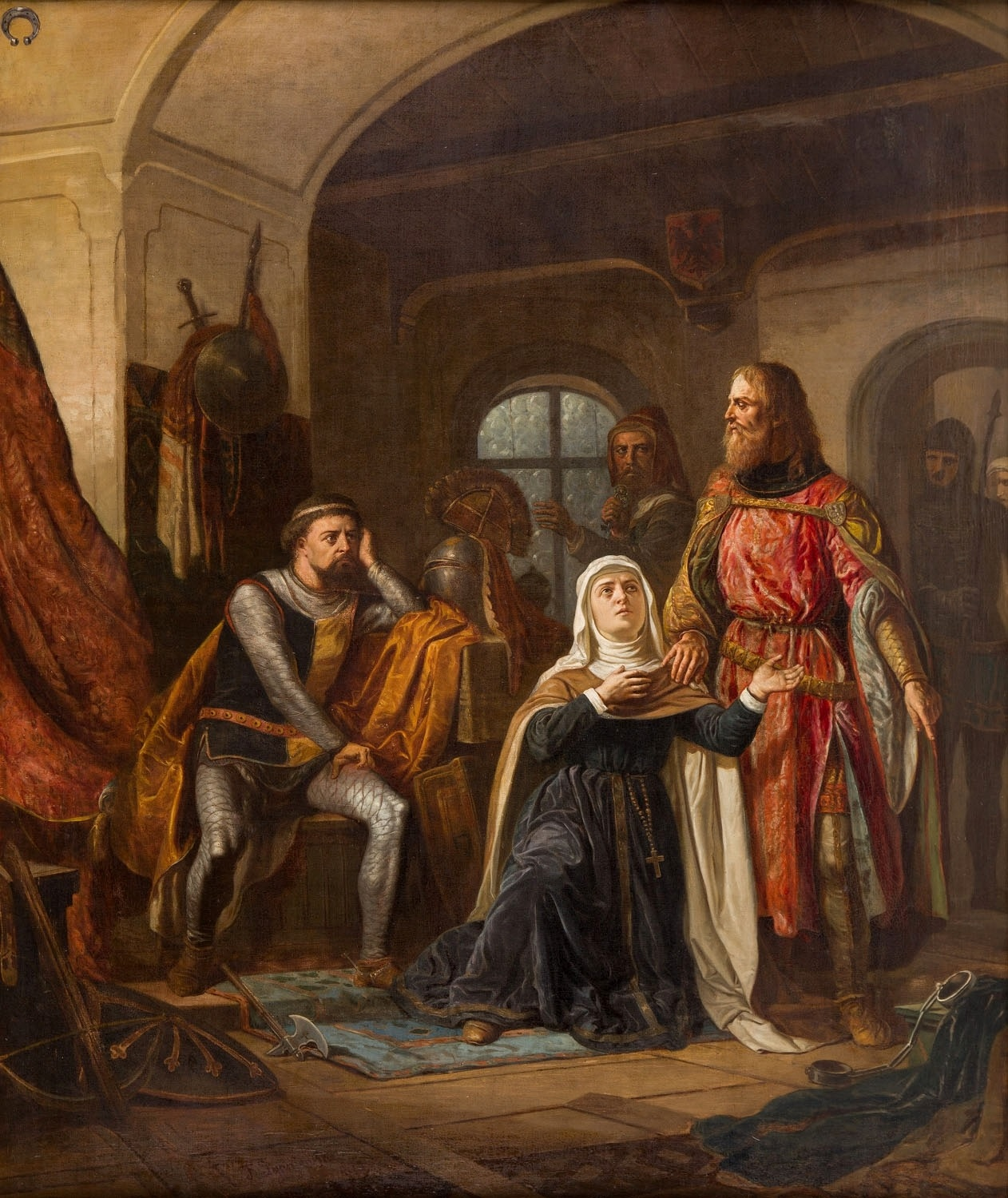
Saint Hedwig reconciles Konrad of Mazowiecki with Henry the Bearded of Silesia, by Feliks Sypniewski

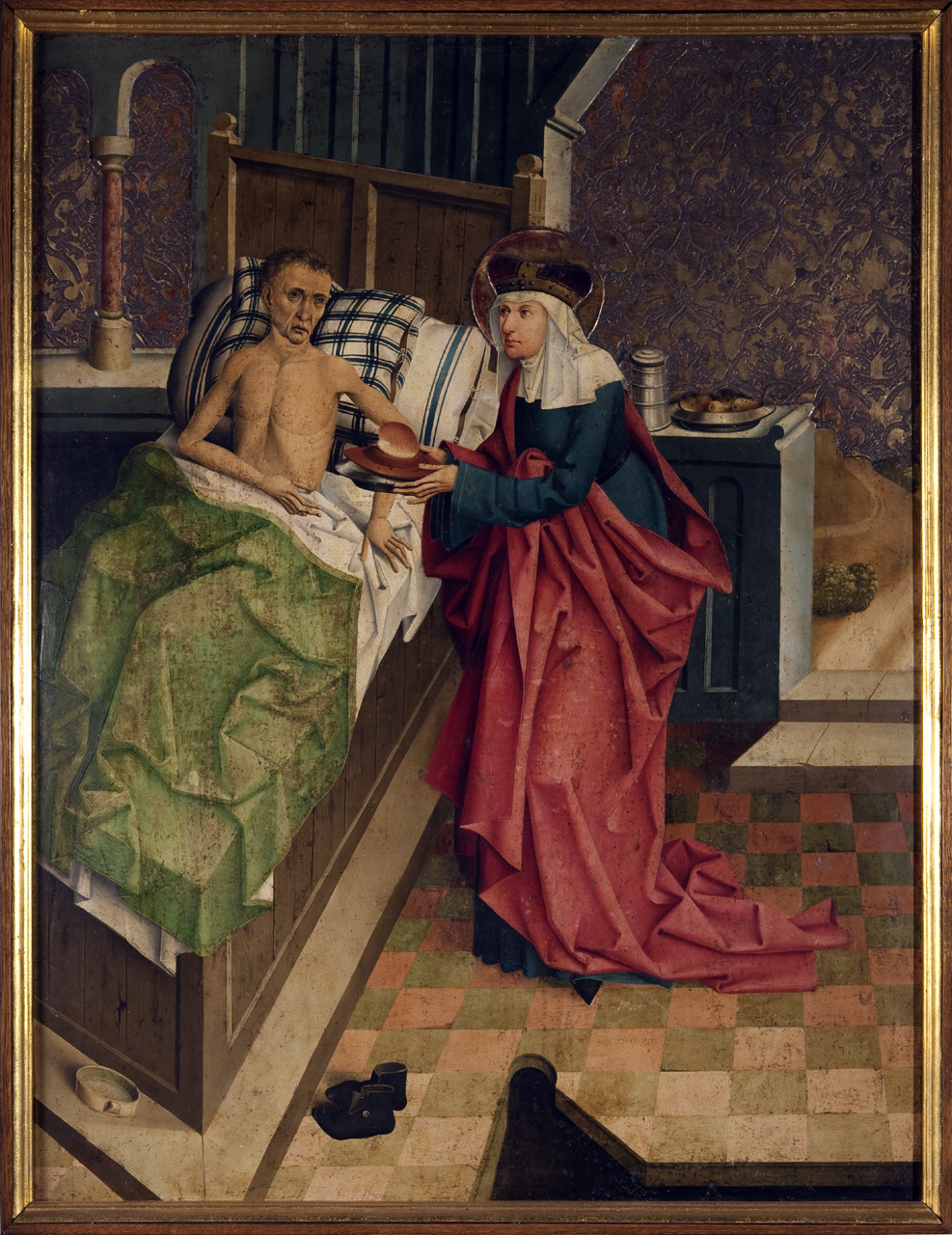
Saint Hedwig depicted on Puchner's Ark

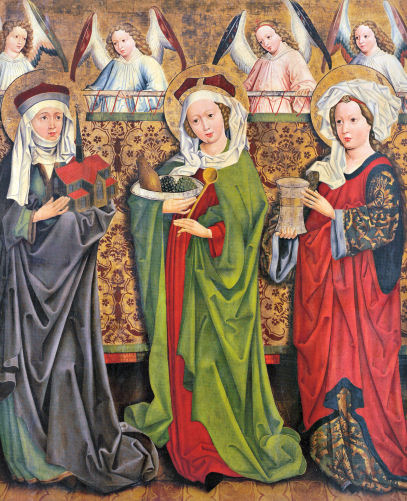
Legnica polyptych (reverse), depicting Saint Hedwig, Saint Elizabeth of Hungary and Saint Mary Magdalene

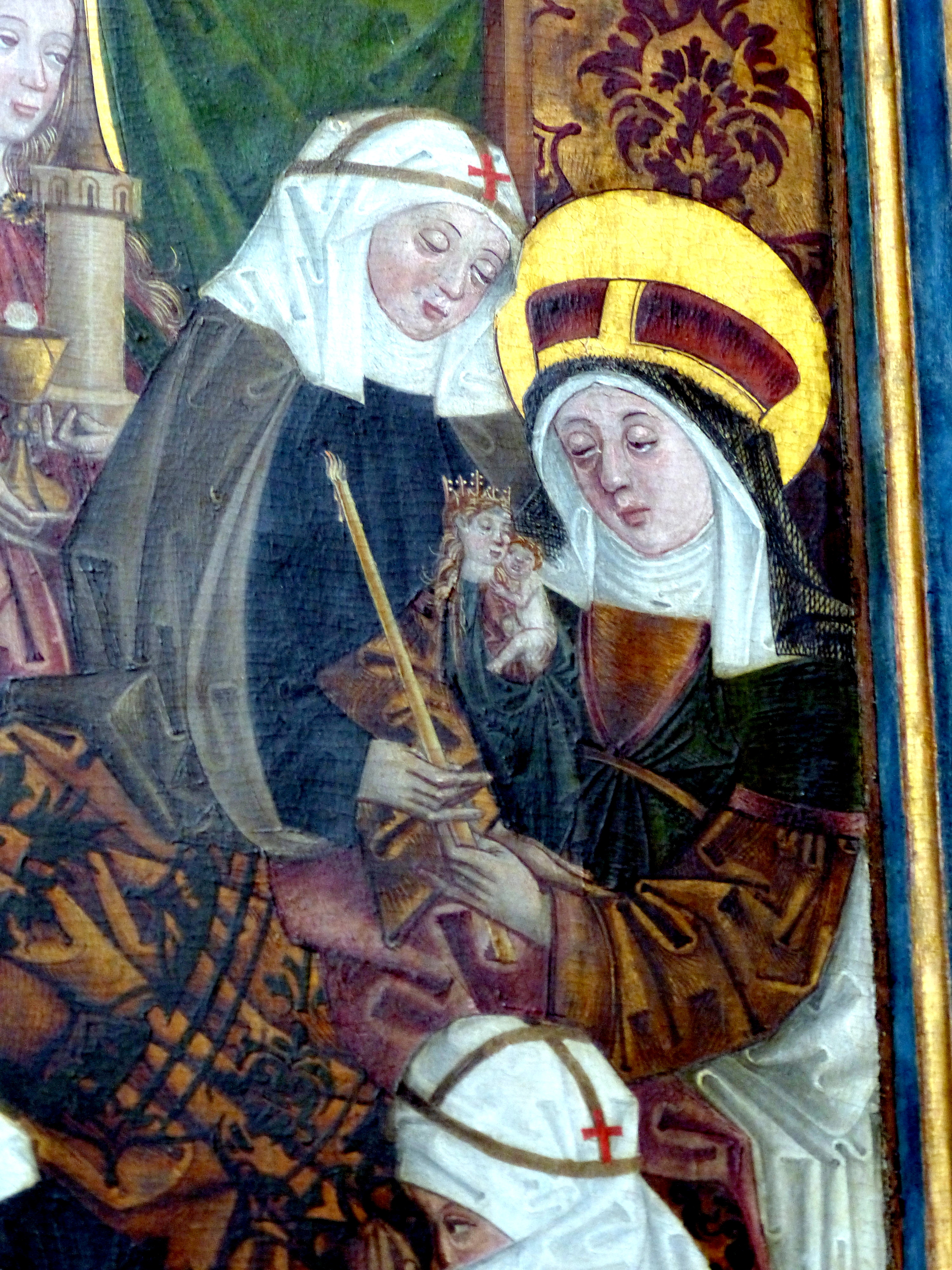
Dying Saint Hedwig looking at a statue of the Virgin Mary, Saint Catherine's church, Brandenburg an der Havel

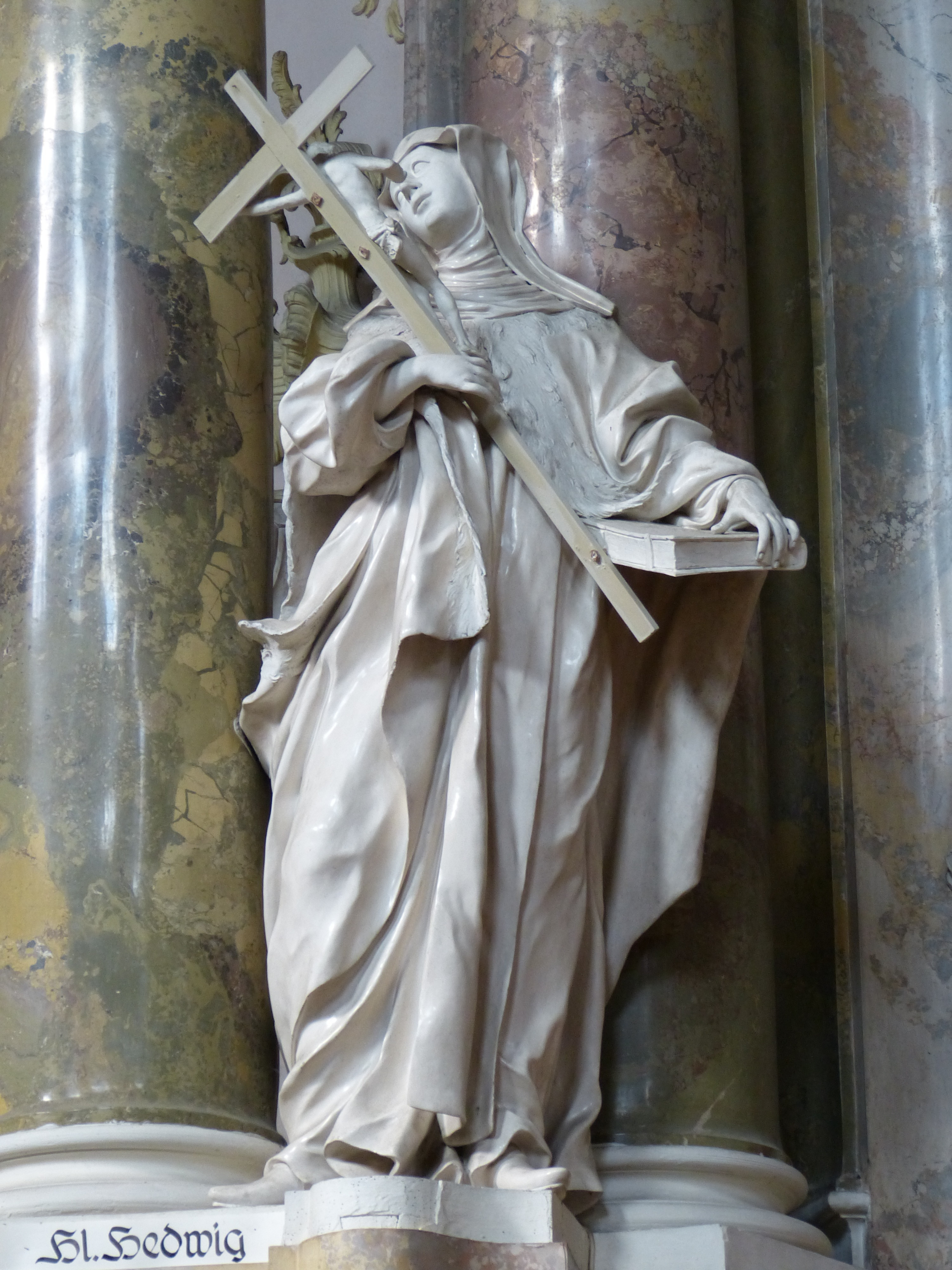
Statue of Saint Hedwig in Engelszell Abbey

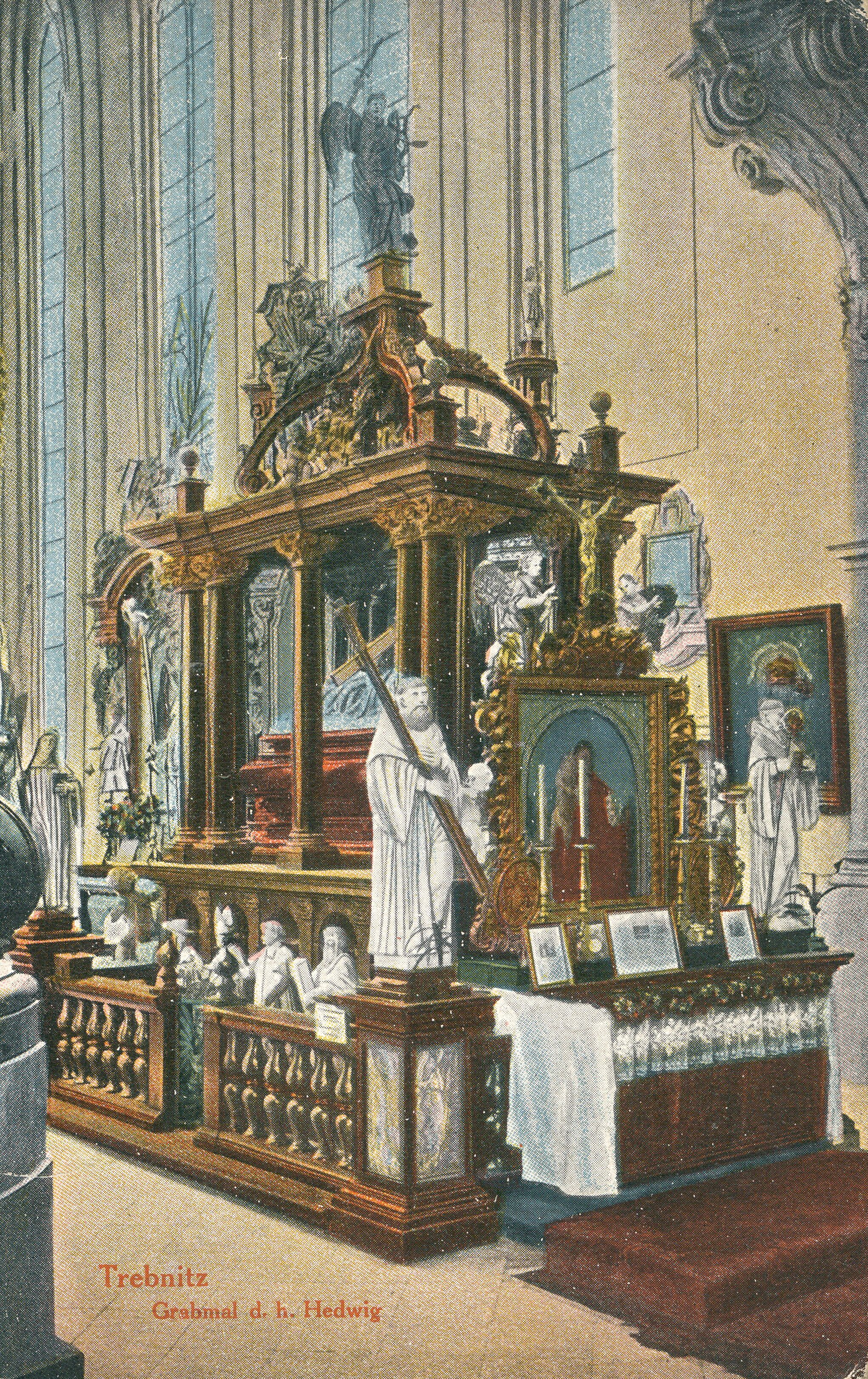
Postcard of the Tomb of Saint Hedwig

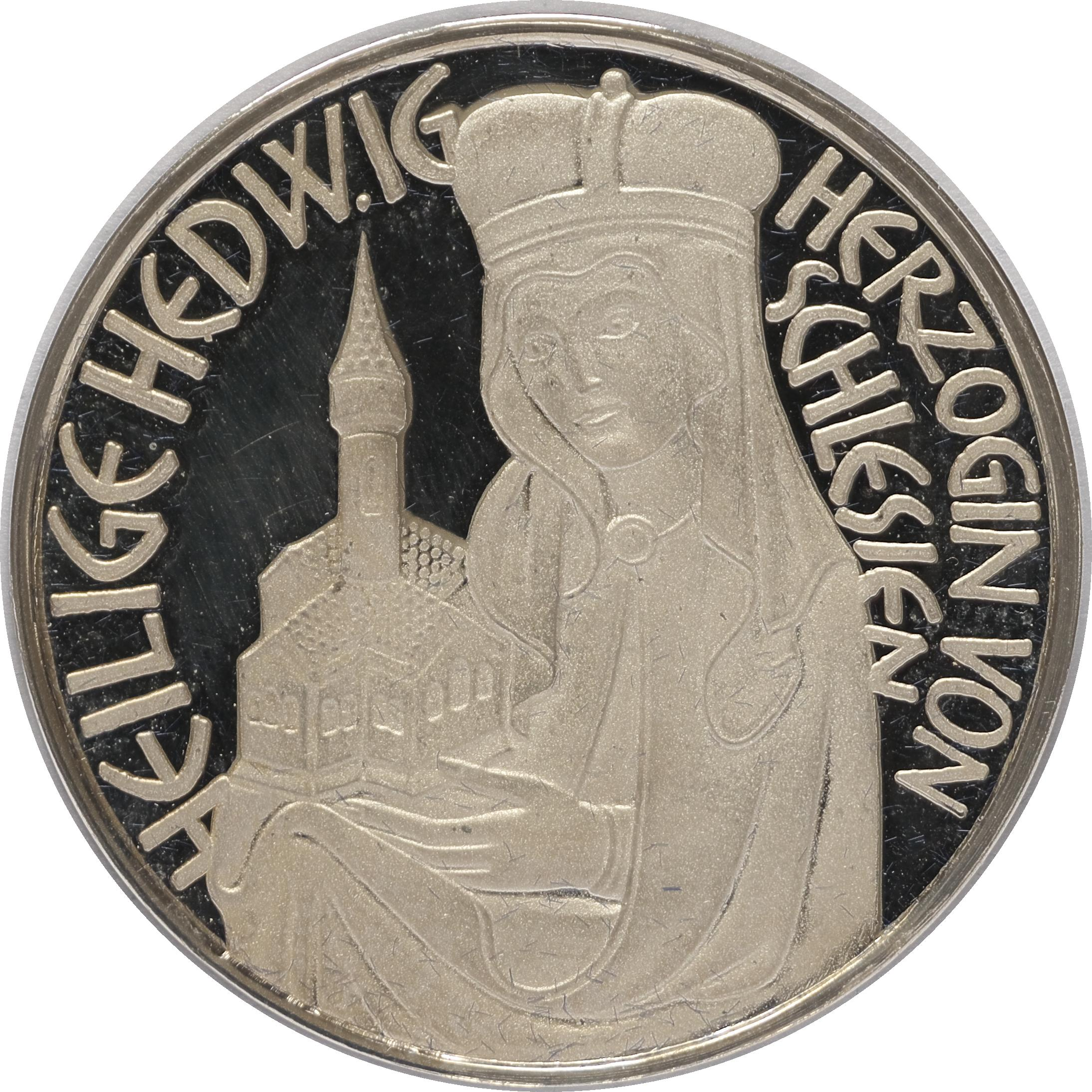
Silver medal of Saint Hedwig

== See also ==
- Saint Hedwig of Silesia, patron saint archive

Hedwig of Silesia House of Andechs Born: 1174 Died: 15 October 1243
Royal titles
Preceded by Agafia of Rus	High Duchess consort of Poland; 1232–1238	Succeeded by Anne of Bohemia
