= Jan Soběslav of Moravia =

Junior margrave of Moravia

Jan Soběslav

Junior Margrave of Moravia
- Born: c. 1357
- Died: c. 30 October 1382
- House: Luxembourg
- Father: John Henry, Margrave of Moravia
- Mother: Margaret of Opava

Jan Soběslav of Moravia (c. 1357 – c. 30 October 1380) was a feudal lord in Moravia. He was a Junior Margrave of Moravia.

In historiography, he was often mistaken for his illegitimate half-brother Jan of Moravia, who went into an ecclesiastical career and rose to the Patriarchate of Aquileia.

== Biography ==
Jan was the second son of John Henry, Margrave of Moravia and Margaret of Opava, born between 1355 and 1357. He was raised in Prague in the court of his uncle, Charles IV, Holy Roman Emperor. He was briefly engaged to Charles' daughter Elisabeth of Bohemia, but the marriage never materialized.

Upon the death of his father, Jan Soběslav and his elder brother Jobst of Moravia quarreled over their inheritance. Jan attacked and illegally occupied estates belonging to Jobst. Their issues were settled in 1377 after mediation by Charles IV.

He and his brothers Jobst and Prokop jointly ruled as Margraves of Moravia. John Soběslav likely died around 30 October 1382. His inheritance was the impetus behind a dispute between Jobst and Prokop, which grew into the Moravian Margrave Wars.

== Ancestors ==
Ancestors of Jan Soběslav of Moravia

16. Henry VI, Count of Luxembourg
8. Henry VII, Holy Roman Emperor
17. Beatrice d'Avesnes
4. John of Bohemia
18. John I, Duke of Brabant
9. Margaret of Brabant
19. Margaret of Flanders
2. John Henry, Margrave of Moravia
20. Ottokar II of Bohemia
10. Wenceslaus II of Bohemia
21. Kunigunda of Slavonia
5. Elizabeth of Bohemia
22. Rudolf I of Germany
11. Judith of Habsburg
23. Gertrude of Hohenberg
1. Jan Soběslav of Moravia
24. Ottokar II of Bohemia
12. Nicholas I, Duke of Opava
25. Agnes of Kuenring
6. Nicholas II, Duke of Opava
26. ???
13. Adelaide of Habsburg
27. ???
3. Margaret of Opava
28. Władysław Opolski
14. Przemysław of Racibórz
29. Euphemia of Greater Poland
7. Anna of Racibórz
30. Konrad III of Masovia
15. Anna of Masovia
31. Anna Radziwil
