= Elisabeth of Moravia =

- Margravine of Meissen
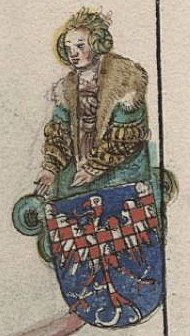
- Born: c. 1355; Brno
- Died: 20 November 1400; Meissen
- Burial: Meissen Cathedral
- Spouse: William I, Margrave of Meissen
- House: Luxembourg
- Father: John Henry of Moravia
- Mother: Margaret of Opava

Elisabeth of Moravia (German: Elisabeth von Mähren, Czech: Alžběta Moravská [ˈalʒbjɛta ˈmorafskaː], Upper Sorbian: Hilžbjeta Morawska [ˈhʲilʒbʲɛta ˈmɔʁafska], c. 1355 – 20 November 1400) was the second daughter and third issue of John Henry of Moravia, (great-grandson of Přemysl II, Otakar, King of Bohemia) and his second wife Margaret of Opava. She became Margravine consort of Meissen by her marriage to William I, Margrave of Meissen (1366).

Elizabeth was buried in Prince's Chapel of Meissen Cathedral.

== Marriage ==
Elizabeth was married to William I, House of Wettin in Meissen, spring 1366. The couple had no children.

== Names in other languages ==
- German: Elisabeth von Mähren
- Czech: Alžběta Míšeňská
- Upper Sorbian: Hilžbjeta Morawska
- Dutch: Elizabeth van Moravië
- French: Élisabeth de Moravie
- Italian: Elisabetta di Moravia
- Latin: Elizabeth a Moravia
- Luxembourgish: Elizabeth vu Mieren
- Polish: Elżbieta z Moraw
- Silesian: Elžbjeta s Morawije

== Titles ==
- Margravine of Meissen.

== Ancestors ==
Ancestors of Elisabeth of Moravia

16. Henry VI, Count of Luxembourg
8. Henry VII, Holy Roman Emperor
17. Beatrice d'Avesnes
4. John of Bohemia
18. John I, Duke of Brabant
9. Margaret of Brabant
19. Margaret of Flanders
2. John Henry, Margrave of Moravia
20. Ottokar II, Přemysl of Bohemia
10. Wenceslaus II of Bohemia
21. Kunigunda of Slavonia
5. Elizabeth of Bohemia
22. Rudolf I of Germany
11. Judith of Habsburg
23. Gertrude of Hohenberg
1. Elizabeth of Moravia
24. Ottokar II, Přemysl of Bohemia
12. Nicholas I, Duke of Opava
25. Agnes of Kuenring
6. Nicholas II, Duke of Opava
26. ???
13. Adelaide of Habsburg
27. ???
3. Margaret of Opava
28. Władysław Opolski, Duke of Opole-Racibórz
14. Przemysław of Racibórz
29. Euphemia of Greater Poland
7. Anna of Ratibórz
30. Konrad III of Masovia
15. Anna of Masovia
31. Anna Radziwil

== See also ==
- Margraviate of Moravia
- Jobst of Moravia
- Špilberk Castle
- Moravia

Preceded by Catherine of Henneberg	Margravine Margraviate of Meissen; 1366 – 1400	Succeeded by Amelia of Mazovia
