= Prokop of Moravia =

15th century nobleman

Prokop
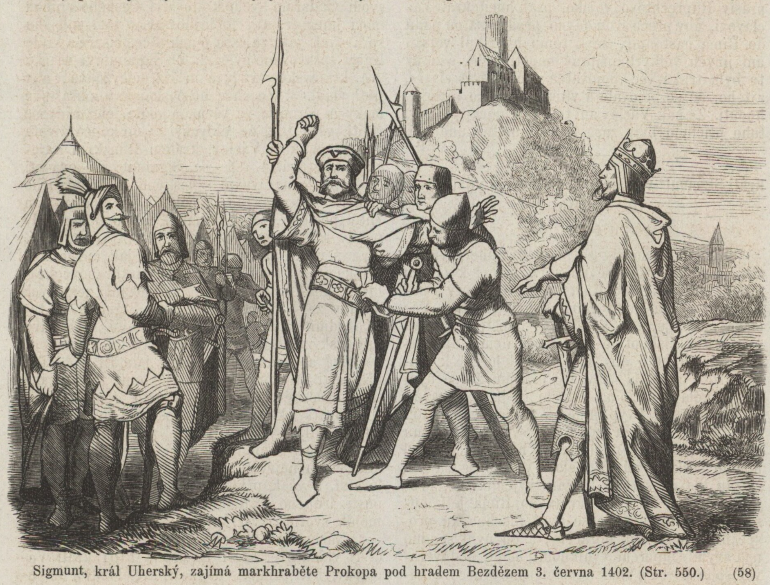
- Prokop of Luxembourg captured by his cousin Sigismund (Česko-moravská kronika, 1868)

Margrave of Moravia
- Reign: 1375–1405
- Predecessor: John Henry
- Successor: Jobst of Moravia
- Born: c. 1358; Brno, Moravia
- Died: 24 September 1405; Královo Pole
- Burial: Královopolský monastery
- Issue: George of Luxembourg (illegitimate)
- House: Luxembourg
- Father: John Henry, Margrave of Moravia
- Mother: Margaret of Opava

Prokop of Moravia, or Prokop of Luxembourg (Czech: Prokop Lucemburský; German: Prokop von Mähren; c. 1358 – 24 September 1405), a member of the House of Luxembourg, was junior Margrave of Moravia from 1375 until his death in 1405 and the provincial governor of the kingdom.

== Biography ==
Prokop was born circa 1358 in the Moravian town of Brno. He was the third son of Margrave John Henry and Margaret of Opava. Upon his father's death in 1375, his eldest brother Jobst was confirmed as Margrave and Lord of Moravia, while Prokop and his brother John Sobieslaw received the title of "junior margraves".

The brothers soon started the so-called Moravian Margrave Wars, fueled by disputes over inheritance and the destabilizing situation after the death of their uncle Charles IV in 1378. Jobst and Prokop ruled Moravia together at that time and participated in the joint efforts of the Luxembourg dynasty to obtain the Polish and Hungarian crowns. They financially supported their cousin Sigismund of Luxembourg in obtaining the Hungarian crown. The Bohemian king Wenceslas IV also sought financial assistance from his Moravian cousins.

In 1402, Prokop became a prisoner of Sigismund of Luxembourg in Prešpurk and remained in prison for two years. Jobst eventually contributed to his release, but Prokop soon succumbed to illness and died on 24 September 1405 in Brno. After his death, Jobst became the sole lord of Moravia.

His illegitimate son George of Luxembourg [cs] was the last descendant of the Luxembourg family. However, due to his illegitimate origin, he could not assert the inheritance rights to the property and titles of his ancestors.

== Ancestors ==
Ancestors of Prokop of Moravia

16. Henry VI, Count of Luxembourg
8. Henry VII, Holy Roman Emperor
17. Beatrice d'Avesnes
4. John of Bohemia
18. John I, Duke of Brabant
9. Margaret of Brabant
19. Margaret of Flanders
2. John Henry, Margrave of Moravia
20. Ottokar II, Přemysl of Bohemia
10. Wenceslaus II of Bohemia
21. Kunigunda of Slavonia
5. Elizabeth of Bohemia
22. Rudolf I of Germany
11. Judith of Habsburg
23. Gertrude of Hohenberg
1. Prokop of Moravia
24. Ottokar II, Přemysl of Bohemia
12. Nicholas I, Duke of Opava
25. Agnes of Kuenring
6. Nicholas II, Duke of Opava
26. ???
13. Adelaide of Habsburg
27. ???
3. Margaret of Opava
28. Władysław Opolski, Duke of Opole-Racibórz
14. Przemysław of Racibórz
29. Euphemia of Greater Poland
7. Anna of Ratibórz
30. Konrad III of Masovia
15. Anna of Masovia
31. Anna Radziwil
