= Constance, Duchess of Wodzisław =

Polish princess (died 1351)

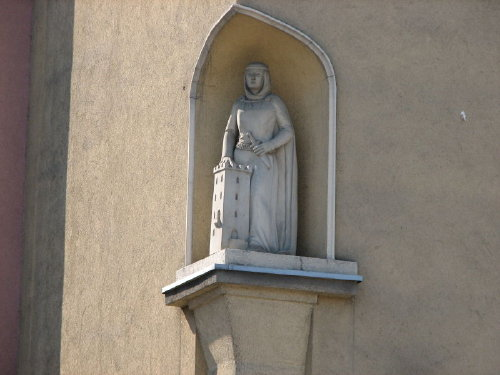
Statue of Duchess Constance of Wodzisław, situated in a corner of the local market.

Constance (Polish: Konstancja; died 1351) was a Polish princess from the House of Piast and sovereign Duchess of Wodzisław Śląski from 1324 until her death.

Her name appears twice in contemporary sources: firstly, in a letter of Pope John XXII dated 22 September 1321, where she is named "Duchess of Racibórz", and secondly in the Chronicle of Racibórz, who give her the title of "Duchess of Wodzisław" (księżną wodzisławską) and mentions her death in 1351. None of these sources showed Constance's parentage. Historians and sources are agreed that she was a member of the Piast dynasty; however, the difficulty of establishing who her father was caused two theories to emerge about her origins.

The first hypothesis states that Constance was the daughter of Duke Władysław of Opole and wife of Henry IV Probus, Duke of Wrocław, who repudiated her after several years of marriage. She moved to Racibórz at the court of her brothers Mieszko I and Przemysław, who gave her the district of Wodzisław as her own Duchy, where she remained until her death. Historians who dispute this theory alleged that Władysław of Opole had a daughter of unknown name, who died shortly after her marriage with Henry IV, or between her repudiation and Henry IV's subsequent marriage.

According to the second hypothesis, based on Constance's titles showed in sources: Duchess of Racibórz and Duchess of Wodzisław, she was the daughter of Duke Przemysław of Racibórz. Certainly she remained unmarried and settled in Wodzisław (which probably was her own independent Duchy) until her death.

== Life ==
=== Daughter of Władysław of Opole ===
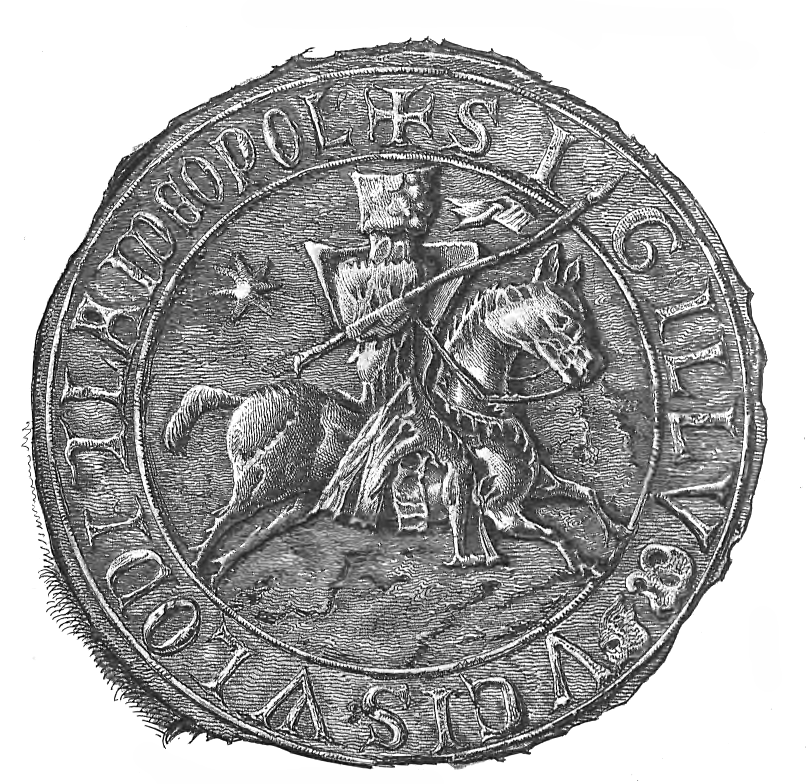
Władysław Opolski's seal, dated from 1247

==== Problems about her identification ====
In medieval sources, it is only known that from the marriage between Euphemia, daughter of Władysław Odonic, Duke of Greater Poland, and Władysław, Duke of Opole, was born a daughter who married Henry IV Probus, Duke of Wrocław. No source directly specified her name, and therefore the historiography is divided about this fact and her correct identification in the Piast dynasty. Some historians share the view that she was Constance of Wodzisław, but the opponents of this idea argue that her name remains unknown. Also not gaining universal approval are the hypotheses arguing that Władysław of Opole's daughter was named either Margareta or Grzymisława. In the absence of proper sources who could clarify this matter, all the information and theories only created more difficulties in reconstructing her life.

==== Birth ====
The exact birth date of the daughter of Władysław of Opole is unknown. The approximate year of birth was established on the basis of one of the two supplications addressed to the Pope, whose credibility are now called into question. In those documents, her brothers (considered by historians as the authors of the two complaints) requested an adjournment of their sister's wedding with Henry IV, since they felt that her age wasn't appropriate for a bride. Since the marriage's date was established between 1277 and 1280, she could be born about 1265. Her birth probably took place in Opole, the capital of her father's Duchy, or in Racibórz. By convention, among the offspring of Władysław of Opole and Euphemia of Greater Poland, she is placed as the fifth and last child, although she could be older than Przemysław of Racibórz. If her name was Constance, she probably was named after her cousin Constance, daughter of Przemysł I of Greater Poland.

==== Marriage with Henry IV Probus ====
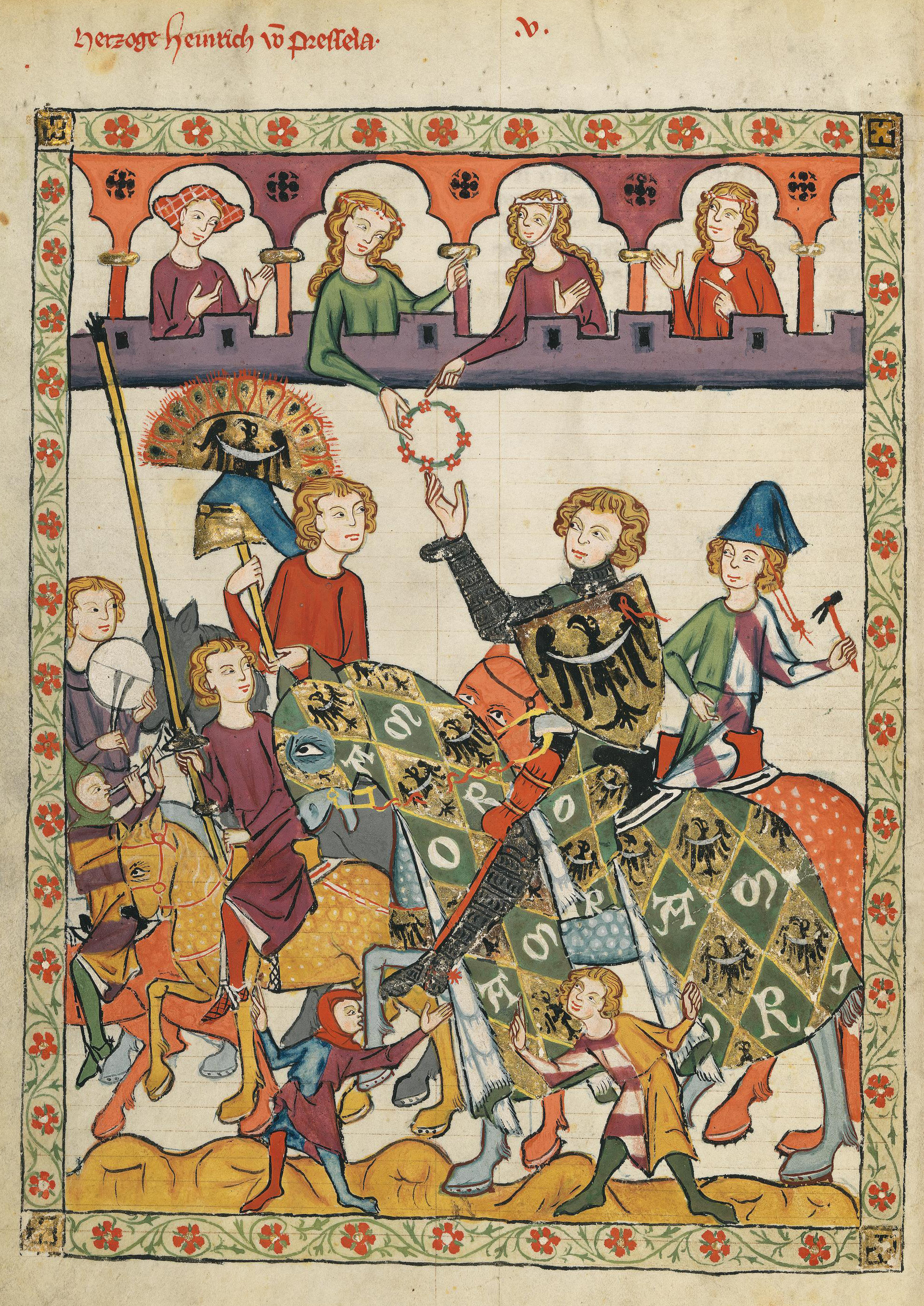
Henry IV Probus, Codex Manesse, about 1300

Władysław of Opole's daughter was married with Henry IV Probus, Duke of Wrocław. Historians place the wedding between the second half of 1277 and March 1280, this is, between the six-months of captivity of Henry IV by his uncle Bolesław II the Bald (since 22 July 1277) and the Congress of Vienna. The wedding couldn't take place prior to 1277, because in the description of the events of Henry IV's imprisonment in the Polish-Silesian Chronicle, the Duke of Wrocław is identified as a boy, which would be impossible if he was then married. In the Congress of Vienna was settled the dispute between the Dukes of Wrocław and Opole, proved in a document were Władysław called Henry IV his son-in-law. It's possible that the consolidation of the agreement was just the wedding between Henry IV and Władysław's daughter.

According to one hypothesis, the marriage between the daughter of Władysław of Opole and Henry IV Probus only could have taken place between 1277 and 1278. This is based on the following considerations:

In a letter of King Ottokar II of Bohemia to Bruno of Schauenburg, Bishop of Olomouc dated 15 August 1277, the King referred to his allies the Opole Dukes. Since they wanted to arrange a meeting in Racibórz, he requests the presence of Duchess Euphemia of Opole and her daughter, calling a Congress to discuss matters relating to the wedding of Władysław's daughter and Henry IV. The treatments of King Ottokar II were explained in his desire to obtain the support of Henry IV and Władysław of Opole in the war against Rudolf I of Habsburg, King of Germany. According to this hypothesis, there is a proof that in the second half of 1277, there was an alliance between the Dukes of Wrocław and Opole. Among the documents issued by Władysław of Opole and his sons, was found an act who provide support for all the plans of Henry IV. This document was issued after the marriage, because there Duke of Opole called Henry IV his son-in-law, and later in 1278, was added a clause that guarantees the obligations of the Duke of Opole with King Ottokar II of Bohemia, who fell on 26 August 1278 in the Battle on the Marchfeld. It is believed that the marriage took place in 1277 after Henry IV regained his freedom at the cost of giving Bolesław II the third part of his lands, including Środa Śląska and Strzegom (both inherited by Henry IV from his uncle Władysław); at that time, the conclusion of an alliance with the Dukes of Opole was the most favorable for Henry IV. The complaints presented to the Pope supported the hypothesis that the wedding took place in Opole, and was chaired by the Bishop of Wrocław, Thomas II Zaremba. Władysław's daughter probably reunited with her husband in Wrocław after she had the proper age to consummate the marriage.

After settling the dispute with Henry IV at the Congress in Vienna in March 1280, Władysław of Opole issued a document, in which he promised to the Duke of Wrocław, his son-in-law, assistance in obtaining the Polish royal crown. This support would be provided with the condition that her daughter (and Henry IV's wife) was also crowned queen with her husband. Giving into question the credibility of the complaints to the Pope, this document suggests the possibility that the marriage between Henry IV and the princess of Opole took place in Vienna in 1280. In 1281 or 1282, Władysław of Opole died. Since then, the relations of Henry IV with the sons of the deceased Duke were completely different. At that time, the disputes with his brothers-in-law, his efforts to obtain the royal crown and the apparent barrenness of his wife added further problems to Henry IV's political aspirations.

==== Repudiation of Henry IV's wife ====
Almost all the modern historiography universally accepted the view that Henry IV Probus repudiated Władysław of Opole's daughter. It is based on the conclusion that the complainants to the Pope against the Duke of Wrocław's conduct are the Dukes of Opole, Henry IV's brothers-in-law. According to this hypothesis, the princess of Opole was repudiated by her husband in 1287 at the latest, because between 1287–1288, the Duke of Wrocław married with Matilda, daughter of Otto V the Long, Margrave of Brandenburg-Salzwedel.

A detonant for the decision of repudiated his wife, was Henry IV's dispute with Bishop Thomas II Zaremba. Expelled from his dominions, the Bishop took refuge in Racibórz at the side of Dukes Mieszko I and Przemysław, Henry IV's brothers-in-law. On 18 April 1287 Henry IV formally asked Mieszko I to refuse his help to Bishop Thomas II, under the threat of rupture of their good relations. He said no, but instead offering as a mediator in the dispute. Despite the adoption of this proposal, Henry IV decided to divorce his wife. Although this move clearly was made against his alliance with the Opole Dukes, the apparent reason for the repudiation was the infertility of his wife, however this fact could be unfounded, because Henry IV's second marriage with Matilda of Brandenburg was also childless. The Dukes of Opole sent to the Pope two complaints requesting the reinstallation of their sister as Henry IV's wife. The waited response never come, certainly because the complaints were sent during the sede vacante who took place between the death of Pope Honorius IV (on 3 April 1287) and the election of Pope Nicholas IV (on 22 February 1288).

==== Theories about her death during the 1280s ====
In modern historiography were found two views, according to which Henry IV's first wife died during the 1280s, before the conclusion of his subsequent marriage with Matilda of Brandenburg. Both hypotheses are opposed to the identification of Władysław of Opole's daughter as Duchess Constance of Wodzisław.

The first hypothesis states that the Opole princess died probably in 1287 or 1288, shortly before the conclusion of Henry IV's second marriage. One fact that supported this view was in any contemporary source was read anything about the Duke of Wrocław's ventures seeking the annulment of his marriage with Władysław of Opole's daughter or any other obstacles, with the exception of a close relationship before marrying Matilda of Brandenburg. In addition, sources not showed any problems for Henry IV about an irregular marital status during his efforts to obtain the royal crown. This hypothesis has been challenged by historians. Is noted that the marriage of Henry IV with the daughter of Władysław of Opole was invalid without a dispensation from the Pope because of a close affinity between husband and wife (the mother of Henry IV, Judith of Masovia, married with Henry III the White as the widow of Mieszko II the Fat, paternal uncle of the Opole princess). Moreover, in these times, there was still the custom which allowed the dismissal of infertile wives. Thus, an annulment for Henry IV's marriage wasn't needed.

According to another hypothesis, the daughter of Władysław of Opole wasn't repudiated by her husband, but died shortly after her marriage. This is supported by the fact that as the wife of Henry IV, she is not mentioned in the Genealogy of St. Hedwig, which happened on several occasions with spouses of short-term childless marriages. By contrast, the only reference about the repudiation of Henry IV's wife were two complaints sent to the Pope by two brothers, identified as Władysław of Opole's sons; in both documents, are described the dismissal of their sister and the exile of the Bishop. Modern historians believed that the complaints are forgeries, based on the following considerations:

The second complaint related that at the time of Henry IV's marriage with the Opole princess, her brothers are minors, a fact who is proved to be false. The first complaint was addressed to Pope Gregory: the only Pope who bears that name during the second half of the 13th century was Pope Gregory X, who died in 1276, before the events reported in the complaints. The contents of both documents shows that the man who dismissed his wife, was the ruler of a foreign language, but both spouses came from the same diocese. Finally, the repudiation of Henry IV's wife wasn't mentioned during his long dispute with Bishop Thomas II Zaremba, who constantly enumerated the Duke's vices.

=== Daughter of Przemysław of Racibórz ===
Przemysław of Racibórz's seal, dated from 1287-1298.

According to another theory, Constance was the daughter of Duke Przemysław of Racibórz and his wife Anna, daughter of Duke Konrad II of Czersk. Probably born before 1307, is understood that she was the youngest child of Ducal couple. She probably named after Constance, Abbess of Trzebnica and daughter of Duke Ziemomysł of Inowroclaw, while her brother, Leszek, was named after Leszek II the Black (Ziemomysł's brother). Constance probably never married. Until her death in 1351 she lived in Wodzisław Śląski, which certainly represented her personal fief.

Assuming that this hypothesis were true, it's easier to explain the title given to Constance in the Papal letter: Duchess of Racibórz. According to some historians, if Constance was the daughter of Władysław of Opole, the appropriate title for her in this document would be Duchess of Opole. In addition, is hard to believe that Constance, daughter of Władysław of Opole, could live almost 86 years. Another point in favor of the hypothesis about the origin of Constance is the fact that after the death of Anna of Czersk, Duke Leszek of Racibórz give the district of Wodzisław (Anna's dower) to Constance, which is more understandable if she was his sister rather than an old paternal aunt. Another argument who supported this view was provided by the archaeological research in the Dominican monastery of Racibórz. The experts founded that in the first half of the 14th century, was buried there an approximately 40-year-old woman who died as result of a disease. If this remains belonged to Constance, they proved that her father could be Przemysław of Racibórz.

=== Rule of Constance in Wodzisław ===
Duchy of Wodzisław (Ducatus Loslensis), according to a 15th-century map.

Following the hypothesis who identified Constance as the daughter of Władysław of Opole, after she was repudiated by her husband came to Racibórz at the side of her brothers Mieszko I and Przemysław. Probably because she lived in that district was called Duchess of Racibórz in the Papal letter of 22 September 1321, in which Duke Władysław of Oświęcim and his wife Euphrosyne of Płock received the right to choose their own confessor. The issue is determined how long Constance stayed in Racibórz. According to one theory, shortly after her arrival, Mieszko I gave to Constance the district of Wodzisław as her own Duchy during her lifetime. Another hypothesis assumes that Constance resided in Racibórz until the death of Anna of Czersk (aft. 13 July 1324), Przemysław's widow, who received Wodzisław as her dower. Then Duke Leszek of Racibórz (son of Przemysław and Anna) gave Constance the domain over Wodzisław, a fact who is easier to explain, if Constance was his sister and not his aunt.

During the reign of Constance, in Wodzisław occurred two significant events. The first of them was the invasion of Casimir III the Great in Silesia from June 1345 during the Polish-Czech War. Polish troops gained the towns of Pszczyna, Rybnik and Żory, all adjacent to Wodzisław. Only the presence of the Bohemian King John of Luxembourg in Fryštát could stop the imminent attack to Constance's duchy. The second event was the epidemic of plague (commonly known as Black Death), by which perhaps the Duchess Constance had died.

Constance ruled over Wodzisław until her death in 1351, according to the message of the Chronicle of Racibórz. Then the heir of the Duchy of Racibórz as husband of Princess Anna, Duke Nicholas II of Opawa, reunited the land to Racibórz.

== Place of burial ==
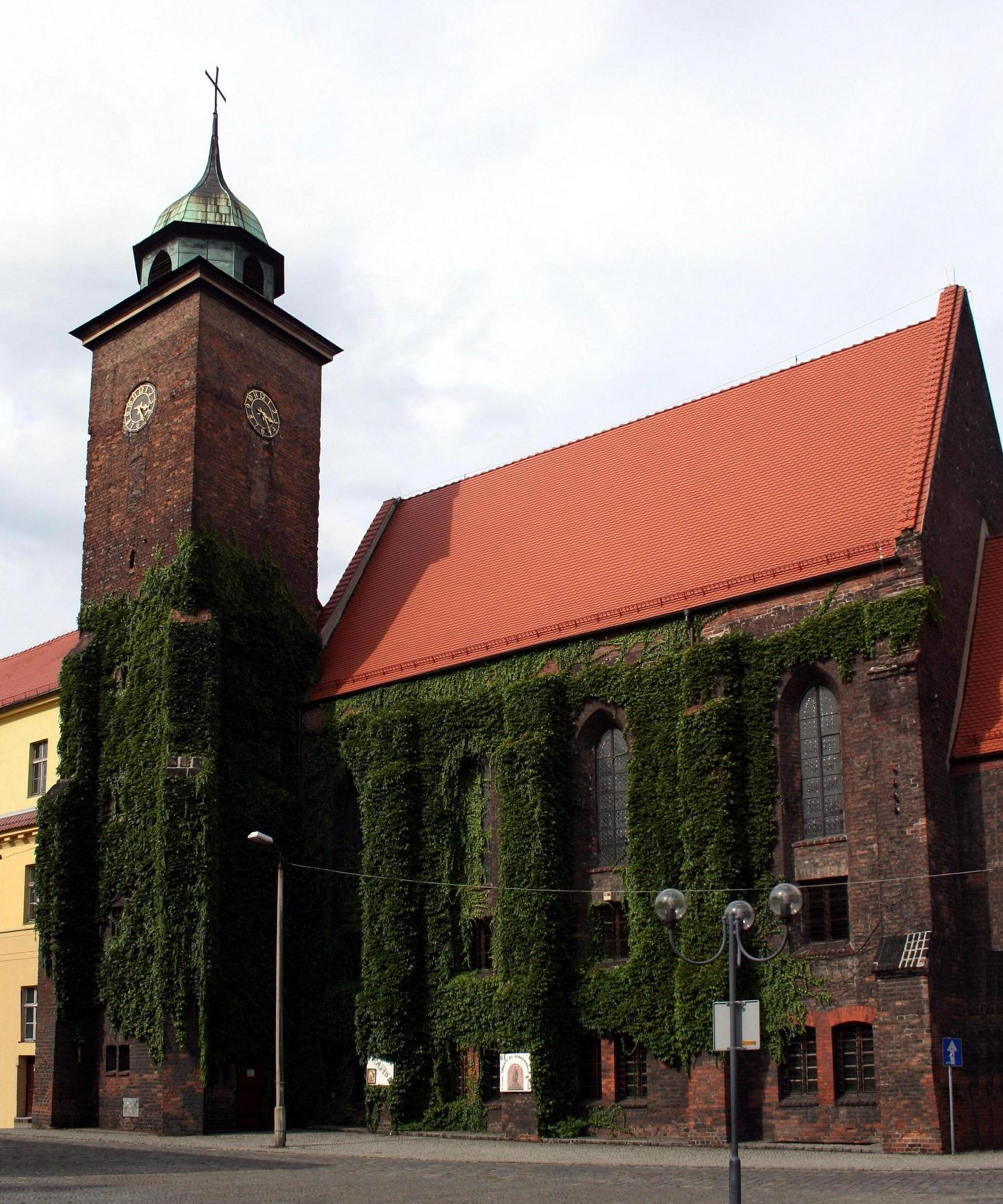
The Dominican monastery of Racibórz, Constance's probable place of burial

Constance's burial place is unknown. It is believed that she was buried either in the parish church or a Franciscan monastery in Wodzisław Śląski, or - more likely - in the Dominican monastery in Racibórz.

In 1992 during excavations in the church of the former Dominican monastery (now a museum) in Racibórz, was a tomb from the first half of the 14th century. Inside were the remains of a woman who died aged about 40 years. Next to them were discovered numerous traces of lime, indicating that the person resting in the grave died as result of an infectious disease. It is known that between 1349–1351 the Duchy of Wodzisław was affected by a plague epidemic. Given that the timeline matches up, it could be inferred that these are the remains of the Duchess of Wodzisław.

== Constance in art and culture ==
The nickname "preclarissima" (the brightest), given to Constance in the Chronicle of Racibórz, indicates that as a ruler, she gained wide respect from her subjects. This is proved by the local legends, where she is named the Gray Lady or Lady of Wodzisław.

In Wodzisław are signs which commemorate Duchess Constance. Her name was given to one street (Duchess Constance Street), a school (The Duchess Constance Gimnazjum No 4), and one of the monumental oak trees on the beach near Balaton lake (Constance). Also, in a niche of the corners of the market town was placed a statue of her.
