= Leszek of Racibórz =

Duke of Racibórz and Koźle

Leszek
- Duke of Racibórz, Koźle
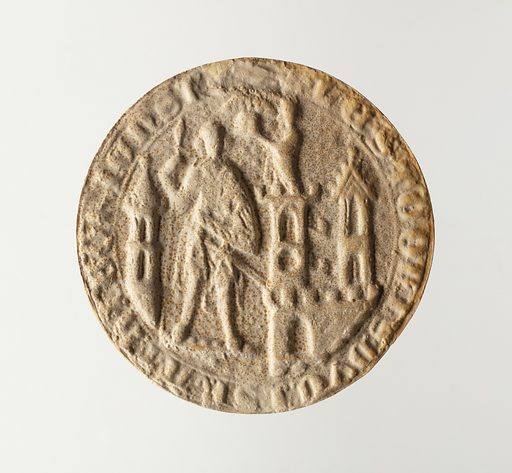
- Seal of Leszek
- Born: c. 1292
- Died: 1336
- Noble family: Silesian Piasts
- Spouse: Agnes of Głogów-Żagań
- Father: Przemysław of Racibórz
- Mother: Anna of Masovia (b.1270)

Leszek of Racibórz (c. 1292 – 1336) was a Duke of Racibórz since 1306 and Duke of Koźle from 1334 until his death.

He was the eldest child and only son of Duke Przemysław of Racibórz by his wife Anna, daughter of Duke Konrad II of Masovia.

== Life ==
After his father's death in 1306, Leszek succeeded him in the Duchy of Racibórz; but, because he was underage at that, he was placed under the regency of his uncle Mieszko I, Duke of Cieszyn until 1308. During this time the Dominican Order was confirmed with the authorization to complete the construction of a monastery in Wodzisław, an event who was celebrate by the Chapter with prayers on behalf of the Duke of Racibórz for all the facilities that he give to the Dominicans. On 19 February 1327, together with other Silesian rulers, Leszek paid homage to King John of Bohemia in Opava.

In 1332, Leszek married with Agnes (ca. 1321 – 7 July 1362), daughter of Duke Henry IV of Głogów-Żagań. The union proved to be childless.

On 21 February 1334 Leszek increased his domains with the acquisition of the Duchy of Koźle by the amount of 4,000 pieces of silver from his cousin Duke Władysław of Bytom, with the compromise that, in the event of his death without issue, Koźle return to the Duchy of Bytom.

Leszek died in 1336 and was buried in the Dominican monastery of Racibórz. After his death, as a result of the arbitrary decision of King John of Bohemia (and despite the strong resistance of the other Piast rulers in Upper Silesia who were their closest male relatives), the Duchy of Racibórz was given to Duke Nicholas II, Duke of Opava, who claimed the rights of his wife Anna, Leszek's oldest sister. Koźle returned to Duke Władysław of Bytom after the payment of a monetary compensation to Euphemia, Leszek's youngest sister.

Regnal titles
Preceded by Przemysław	Duke of Racibórz; 1306–1336	Succeeded by Nicholas II
Preceded by Władysław	Duke of Koźle; 1334–1336	Succeeded by Casimir
