= Matilda of Brandenburg =

Matilda of Brandenburg may refer to:

- Mathilde von Brandenburg (c. 1210–1261) - wife of Duke Otto I of Lüneburg
- Matilda of Brandenburg (d. 1298) (c. 1270–bef. 1298) - wife of Duke Henry IV Probus of Wrocław
