= Church of St. Thomas (Brno) =

Coordinates: 49°11′52.59″N 16°36′27.16″E

- Kostel sv. Tomáše Apoštola a Zvěstování P. Marie
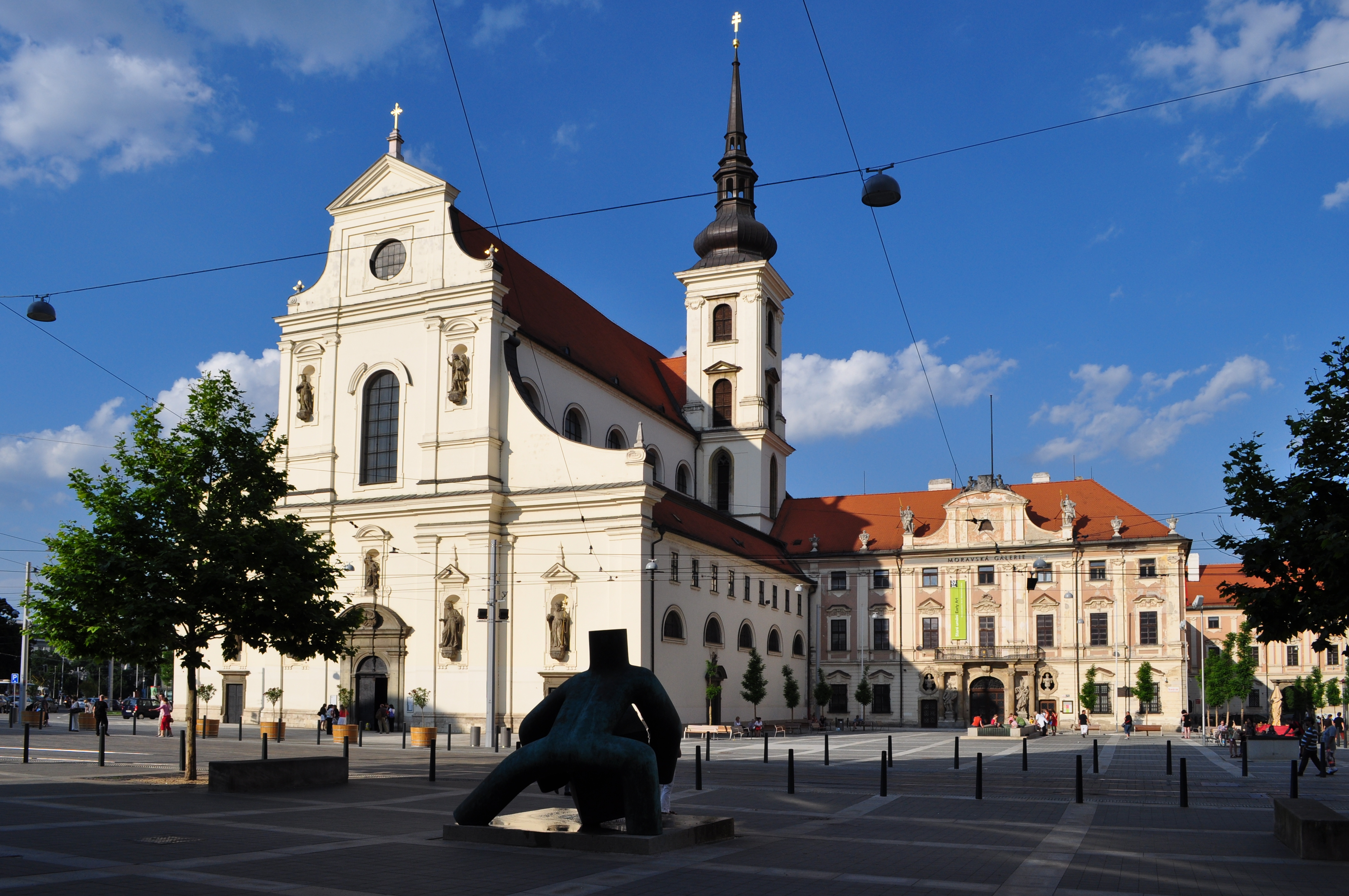
- Church of Saint Thomas and the Annunciation, and the Governor's Palace

- Location within Czech Republic
- Location: Brno
- Country: Czech Republic
- Denomination: Roman Catholic
- Website: https://svtomas.net

History
- Status: Active

Architecture
- Functional status: Parish church
- Architectural type: Church
- Style: Baroque

Administration
- Diocese: Brno

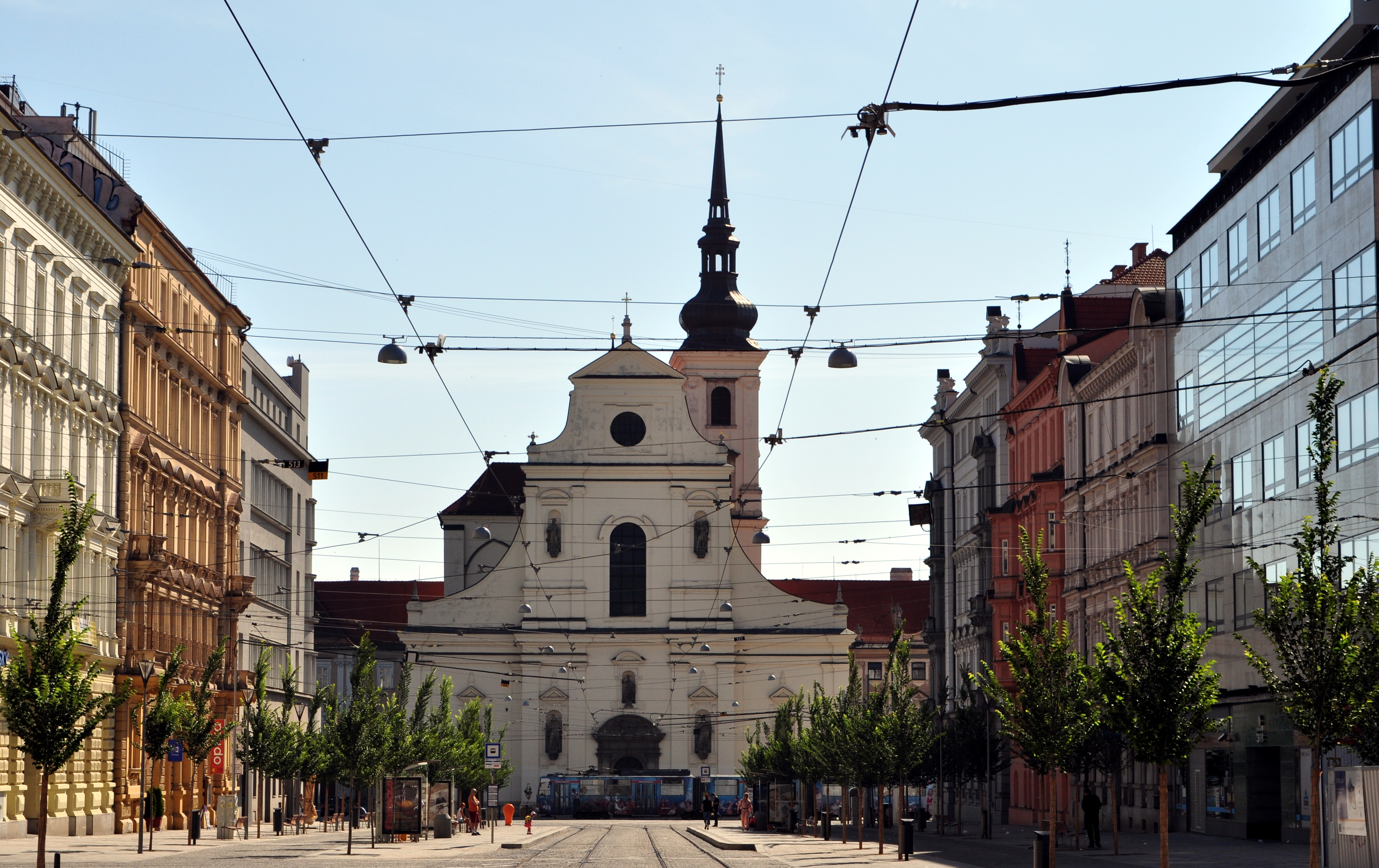
Joštova Street ends by the western facade of the church

The Church of Saint Thomas and the Annunciation (Czech: Kostel sv. Tomáše Apoštola a Zvěstování P. Marie) is a historic church in Brno, Czech Republic.

The church, originally part of an Augustinian monastery, was founded in the middle of 14th century by John Henry of Luxembourg, Margrave of Moravia, with active support of his brother Charles IV., Roman Emperor. After six years of work the church was consecrated (March 13, 1356) by the Olomouc Bishop Jan Očko of Vlašim in the presence of King Charles IV, suzerain of John Henry. Margrave John Henry and his son Jobst of Moravia, titular King of the Germans, are buried here – in the tomb in front of the main altar. John Henry's second consort, Margaret of Opava, reportedly is buried here, as well.

In the south nave is located famous example of polychromed stone statue in high Gothic style, known as Pietà of Saint Thomas

Current baroque appearance dates back to the second half of the 17th century when the church was repaired and rebuilt after severe damage caused by the Swedish siege of Brno during the Thirty Years War.

The architect Adolf Loos was baptized in the church on 1 January 1871.
