= Władysław of Opole =

Władysław of Opole may refer to:

- Władysław Opolski (1225-1282)
- Władysław Opolczyk (1326-1401)
