= Anna of Masovia, Duchess of Racibórz =

Anna of Masovia (c. 1270-after July 13, 1324) was a Princess of Masovia and was a member of the House of Piast.

She was the daughter and only child of Konrad II of Masovia and Hedwig, daughter of Bolesław II the Bald. Between 1289 and 1290 Anna married Przemysław of Racibórz. Anna was Duchess of Racibórz along with her unnamed sister-in-law. She was then widowed May 7, 1306. With her husband, Anna had the following children:

1. Leszek (b. ca. 1292 - d. 1336).
2. Anna (b. 1292/98 - d. 1 January/21 August 1340), married in 1318 with Duke Nicholas II, Duke of Opava.
3. Euphemia (b. 1299/1301 - d. 17 January 1359).

Is also believed that Constance, who ruled in Wodzisław Śląski until her death in 1351 was also her daughter.

When her son Leszek was old enough to exercise power over the principality, Anna probably moved to Wodzislaw where she lived with the consent of her son. She lived with her supposed third daughter Constance. After her death, Anna was buried in Raciborz, presumably the Dominican Church or the Dominican monastery.

== Ancestry ==
Ancestors of Anna of Masovia, Duchess of Racibórz

16. Casimir II the Just
8. Konrad I of Masovia
17. Helen of Znojmo
4. Siemowit I of Masovia
18. Svyatoslav III Igorevich
9. Agafia of Rus
19. Yaroslava Yurikovna
2. Konrad II of Masovia
20. Roman the Great
10. Daniel of Galicia
21. Anna
5. Perejasława of Galacia
22. Mstislav Mstislavich
11. Anna of Novgorod
23. Anna the Cuman
1. Anna of Masovia
24. Henry I the Bearded
12. Henry II the Pious
25. Hedwig of Andechs
6. Bolesław II the Bald
26. Ottokar I of Bohemia
13. Anne of Bohemia
27. Constance of Hungary
3. Hedwig of Silesia
28. Bernhard, Count of Anhalt
14. Henry I, Count of Anhalt
29. Judith of Poland
7. Hedwig of Anhalt
30. Hermann I, Landgrave of Thuringia
15. Irmgard of Thuringia
31. Sophia of Bavaria

== Bibliography ==
- Group work Raciborz Millennium, Ed. News Raciborskie, Raciborz 2002, ISBN 83-912666-2-1
