= Matilda of Brandenburg, Duchess of Poland =

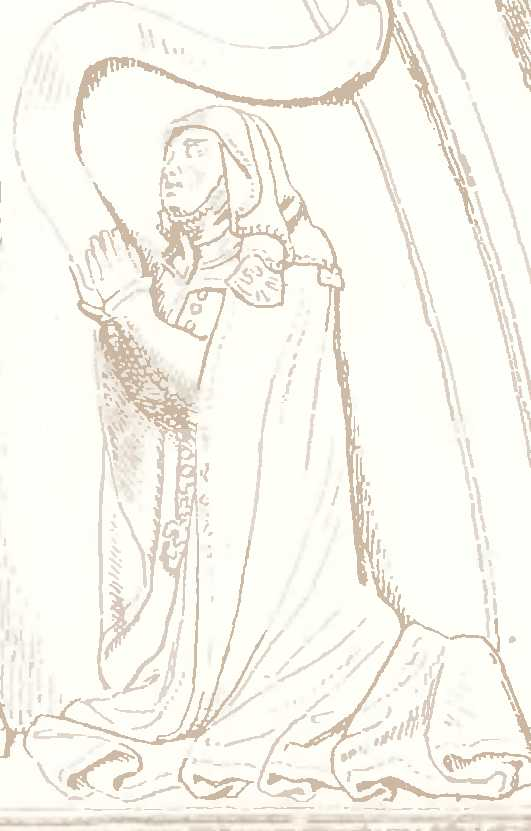
- Noble family: House of Ascania (by birth); Silesian Piasts (by marriage)
- Spouse: Henry IV Probus (m. 1287/1288, d. 1290)
- Father: Otto V, Margrave of Brandenburg-Salzwedel

Matilda of Brandenburg (Polish: Matylda brandenburska, German: Matilda von Brandenburg; c. 1270 – bef. 1 June 1298), was a German princess member of House of Ascania and by marriage Duchess of Wrocław and High Duchess of Poland.

She was the second daughter of Otto V the Long, Margrave of Brandenburg-Salzwedel, by his wife Judith of Henneberg, daughter of Count Herman I, Count of Henneberg and heiress of Coburg and Schmalkalden.

== Life ==
=== Family ===
Matilda had six siblings, three brothers and three sisters. Two of her brothers, Albert and Otto, died young and the eldest, Herman, inherited the whole paternal domains. Matilda's older sister Beatrice married Bolko I the Strict, Duke of Świdnica in 1284. The other two sisters are Kunigunde, who died unmarried, and Judith, who married Rudolph I, Duke of Saxe-Wittemberg in 1303.

The marriage of Matilda's sister into the Silesian branch of the Piast dynasty probably was instrumental to her own future wedding.

=== Marriage ===
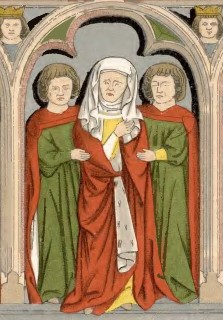
Matilda

By 1287/1288 Matilda married Henry IV Probus, Duke of Wrocław and High Duke of Poland and became his second wife. Henry IV's previous marriage with the daughter of Duke Władysław of Opole (perhaps named Constance) ended either with her death or her repudiation and exile to her homeland. According to other sources, the real reason around the disputed dismissal of the Opole princess was because Henry IV maintained an affair with Matilda and wanted to marry her.

As the couple were relatives, they needed a Papal dispensation, which probably was given shortly after the wedding. They had no children.

On 23 June 1290 Henry IV died unexpectedly, probably poisoned. Soon after, Matilda returned to Brandenburg, where she died before 1 June 1298 and was buried in a Cistercian Kloster Lehnin.

== Bibliography ==
- K. Jasinski, Rodowód Piastów śląskich, Second Edition, Kraków 2007, part I, pp. 160–162.
- M. Spórna and P. Wierzbicki, Słownik władców Polski i pretendentów do tronu polskiego, Kraków 2003, pp. 335–336.

Matilda of Brandenburg, Duchess of Poland House of Ascania Born: ca. 1270 Died: bef. 1 June 1298
Royal titles
| Preceded by Agrippina of Slavonia | High Duchess consort of Poland; 1288–1290 | Succeeded by Rikissa Valdemarsdotter of Sweden |
