= John Henry, Margrave of Moravia =

Count of Tyrol from 1335 to 1341

John Henry
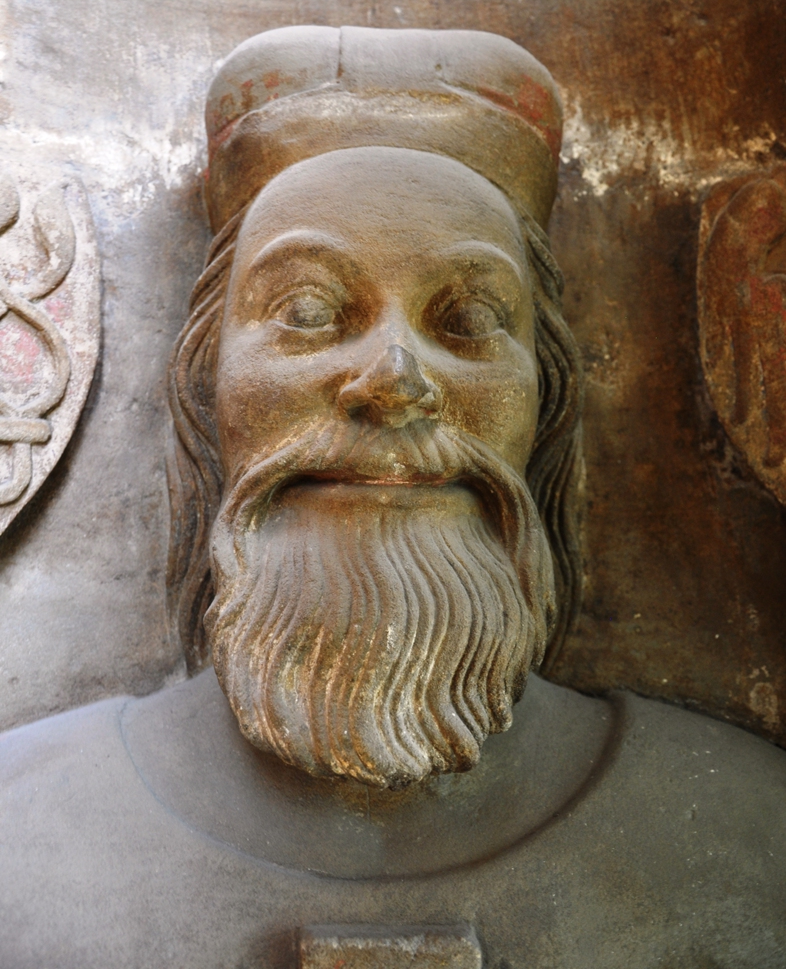
- Bust at St. Vitus Cathedral

Count of Tyrol
- Reign: 1335–1341
- Predecessor: Henry
- Successor: Louis

Margrave of Moravia
- Reign: 1349–1375
- Predecessor: Charles
- Successor: Jobst
- Born: 12 February 1322; Mělník, Bohemia
- Died: 12 November 1375 (aged 53); Brno, Moravia
- Burial: St. Thomas Church, Brno
- Spouse: Margaret, Countess of Tyrol (divorced 1349); Margaret of Opava; Margaret of Austria; Elizabeth of Oettingen
- Issue: Jan of Moravia; Catherine of Moravia; Jobst of Moravia; Elisabeth of Moravia; Anna of Moravia; John Sobieslaw of Moravia; Prokop of Moravia
- House: Luxembourg
- Father: John of Bohemia
- Mother: Elizabeth of Bohemia

John Henry of Luxembourg (Czech: Jan Jindřich Lucemburský, German: Johann Heinrich von Luxemburg, Luxembourgish: Jang Henri vu Lëtzebuerg; 12 February 1322 – 12 November 1375), a member of the House of Luxembourg, was Count of Tyrol from 1335 to 1341 and Margrave of Moravia from 1349 until his death.

== Early life ==
Henry was born at Mělník, the third surviving son of King John of Bohemia (1296–1346) and his wife, the Přemyslid princess Elizabeth (1292–1330). John Henry therefore was the younger brother of Emperor Charles IV. At the time of his birth, the marriage of his parents was already broken; his mother fled to the court of their son-in-law Duke Henry XIV of Bavaria, and John Henry was raised in Cham, Upper Palatinate.

== County of Tyrol ==
King John made attempts to reconcile with his former rival Henry, duke of Carinthia and count of Tyrol, whom he had deposed as king of Bohemia in 1310. In 1327, his younger son John Henry and Henry's daughter, Countess Margaret of Tyrol, were betrothed. As Henry had no sons, King John expected a considerable enlargement of the Luxembourg lands and control over the Tyrolean mountain passes to Italy. John Henry and Margaret were married on 16 September 1330 at Innsbruck. Their suzerain, Emperor Louis IV, in the same year secretly promised Carinthia, the March of Carniola, and large parts of Tyrol to Henry's nephews Dukes Albert II and Otto of Austria.

Henry died on 2 April 1335, and Emperor Louis IV consequently gave Carinthia and southern Tyrol including the overlordship of the prince-bishoprics of Trent and Brixen to the Austrian dukes. King John felt deprived. He put an end to his quarrels with King Casimir III of Poland and campaigned in Austria. A peace was concluded at the city of Enns on 9 October 1336, when John renounced Carinthia, while Margaret and John Henry gained Tyrol.

John Henry's brother Charles acted as regent for his 14-year-old brother John Henry and soon came into conflict with the Tyrolian nobility. Furthermore, John Henry and his wife had developed a strong aversion to each other. Margaret finally took the lead of the insurgence against her husband, when she refused him the access to Castle Tyrol on 1 November 1341. John Henry fled to the Patriarchal State of Aquileia, while his wife claimed that their marriage had never been consummated. Margaret was backed by Emperor Louis IV, who himself had plans to assure the Tyrolian heritage for the House of Wittelsbach. He had the scholars Marsilius of Padua and William of Ockham render an opinion that the marriage was not valid. In 1342, Margaret took her inheritance of Tirol to her next husband, the Emperor's eldest son Margrave Louis I of Brandenburg.

Humiliated, John Henry returned to Bohemia. Furious King John allied with Pope Clement VI, who banned both Louis and Margaret; nevertheless, the Luxembourg rule over Tyrol was terminated. In 1346 John died in the Battle of Crécy and was succeeded by his eldest son, Charles.

== Margraviate of Moravia ==
After John Henry's marriage was conclusively terminated according to canon law in 1349, he married Margaret, daughter of Duke Nicholas II of Opava, and Charles IV gave him the Margraviate of Moravia as appanage. In turn, John Henry had to renounce all rights to the Bohemian throne. His second marriage produced several sons, including the future Margrave Jobst of Moravia. After Margaret of Opava died in 1363, John Henry married Margaret, the daughter of Duke Albert II of Austria and widow of Margaret of Tyrol's son from her marriage with Louis, Count Meinhard III of Tyrol.

John Henry is buried at St Thomas's Abbey, in Brno.

== Genealogy ==
Henry VII; 12 July 1275(6) – 24 August 1313		Margaret of Brabant; 4 October 1276 – 14 December 1311	Wenceslaus II; 27 September 1271 – 21 June 1305		Judith of Habsburg; 13 March 1271 – 18 June 1297
	John of Bohemia; 10 August 1296 – 26 August 1346			Elisabeth of Bohemia; 20 January 1292 – 28 September 1330

1
Margaret of Tyrol
1318 – 3 October 1369
OO 16 September 1330, div.1342
2
Margaret of Opava
26 September 1329 – 1363
OO March 1350
John Henry
12. February 1322 – 12. November 1375
3
Margaret of Austria
1346 – 14. January 1366
OO 26: February 1364
4
Elizabeth of Oettingen

OO c. 1366

1

2/1

2/2

2/3

2/4

2/5

2/6

0 – childless

Catherine of Moravia Duchesse of Falkenberg
1353–1378
Jobst of Moravia

King of the Romans
October 1354–18. January 1411

Elisabeth of Moravia Margravine of Meissen
1355–20. November 1400
Anna of Moravia
1356–98
John Sobieslaw of Moravia

younger (titular) Margrave of Moravia
October 1357– 12. November 1394

Prokop of Moravia

younger (titular) Margrave of Moravia
1358 – September 1403

3

4

0 – childless

0 – childless

== Sources ==
- Boehm, Barbara Drake; Fajt, Jiri, eds. (2005). Prague: The Crown of Bohemia, 1347-1437. Yale University Press.
