= Margaret of Opava =

- Margravine of Moravia
- Born: c. 1330; Opava
- Died: 1363; Brno
- Burial: St. Thomas Church
- Spouse: John Henry of Moravia
- Issue: Catherine of Moravia; Jobst of Moravia; Elisabeth of Moravia; Anna of Moravia; John Sobieslaw of Moravia; Prokop of Moravia
- House: Přemysl-Opava
- Father: Nicholas II of Opava
- Mother: Anna of Racibórz

Margaret of Opava (Czech: Markéta Opavská, Silesian: Margaret s Uopawje, German: Margaret von Troppau, Polish: Małgorzata opawska; 1330–1363) was the youngest daughter of Nicholas II of Opava, (grandson of Přemysl II, Otakar, King of Bohemia) and his third wife Anna of Racibórz. She became Margravine consort of Moravia by her marriage to John Henry of Moravia (1353).

Margaret was buried in Saint Thomas, Brno.

== Children ==
The couple had six children:

- Catherine of Moravia (March 1353 – 1378), consort of Henry, Duke of Falkenberg
- Jobst of Moravia (1351 – 18 January 1411), King of the Romans
- Elizabeth of Moravia/Elizabeth of Meissen (1355 – 20 November 1400). Married William I, Margrave of Meissen.
- Anne, married Peter of Sterberg.
- John Sobieslaw of Moravia (October 1357 – 12 October 1394), (titular, not ruling) Margrave of Moravia
- Prokop of Moravia (November 1358 – September 1405), (titular, not ruling) Margrave of Moravia

== See also ==
- Špilberk Castle
- Veveří Castle

Preceded by Blanche of Valois	Margravine consort of Moravia; 1353 – 1363	Succeeded by Agnes of Opole
