= Konrad II of Masovia =

Polish duke

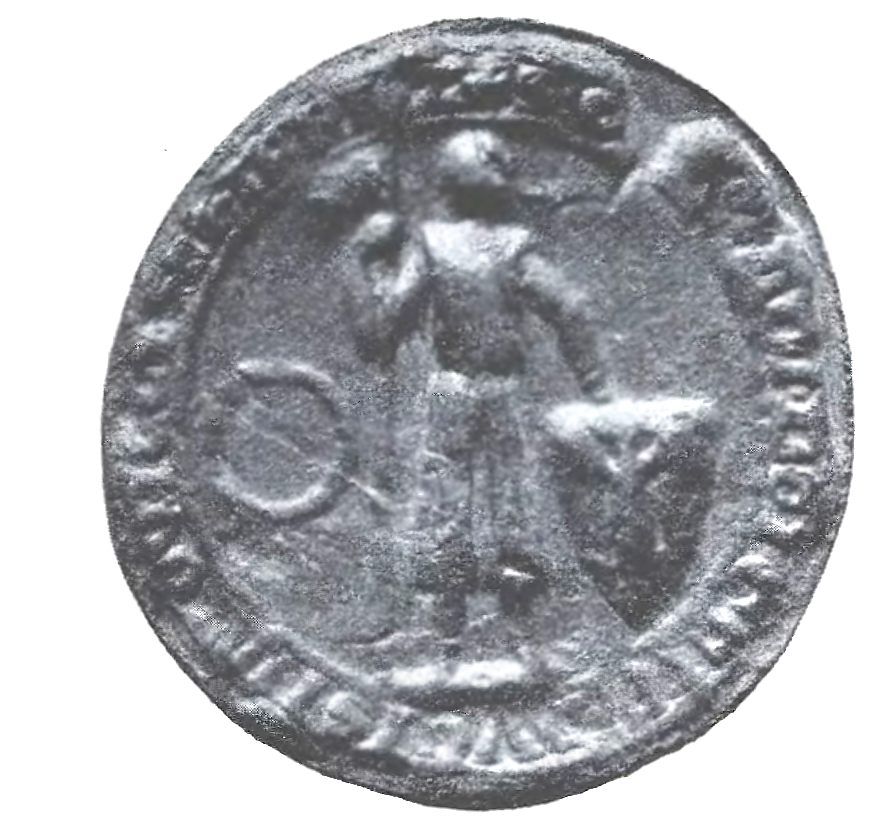
Konrad II's Seal, c. 1285

Konrad II of Czersk (pl: Konrad II czerski; c. 1250 – 24 June/21 October 1294), was a Polish prince member of the House of Piast, Duke of Masovia during 1264-1275 jointly with his brother, after 1275 sole ruler over Czersk and Duke of Sandomierz during 1289.

He was the eldest son of Siemowit I of Masovia and Pereyaslava, a Russian princess.

== Life ==
=== Captivity in Lithuania ===
Konrad II is mentioned for the first time in 1262, when Lithuanian Grand Duke Treniota launched a major campaign against Masovia. He and his father stayed at a small fort in Jazdów when they were surprised by the attack; Siemowit I was killed during the battle and Konrad II was captured by the Lithuanians.

With Konrad II as a prisoner of the Lithuanians and his brother Bolesław II too young to rule, the regency of the Duchy of Masovia was exercised by Bolesław the Pious and the children's mother Pereyaslava. After two years of captivity, Konrad II was released and recovered his lands left to him by his father.

=== Rule ===
In terms of foreign policy, Konrad II continued the line of his father, working closely with Bolesław V the Chaste, Leszek II the Black and Bolesław the Pious. He fought alongside Hungary in the war which opposed Bohemia for the Babenberg inheritance. In 1271 became part of a coalition against Henryk IV Probus, to prevent it from providing support to the Bohemian King Ottokar II. Two years later, the same coalition attacked Władysław Opolski who during the general confusion for the Bohemian-Hungarian war, tried to obtain the Seniorate from Bolesław V, but without results.

In 1275 when his brother Bolesław II attained his majority, forced Konrad II to make a division over their paternal domains. He gave Płock to him, retaining only Czersk. This division didn't satisfied Bolesław II and a prolonged conflict began between the two brothers, who didn't bring any real benefit for any of the parties but caused extensive damage in large parts of the region.

When Bolesław V the Chaste died on 7 December 1279, he was succeeded by his designated heir, Leszek II the Black. The civil war in Masovia prevented Konrad II to claim the Seniorate, but he was allowed to make extensive contacts with the oppositors of the new Duke of Kraków and Sandomierz.

In 1282 Konrad II organized an expedition against Leszek II which ended in a complete failure, although the Masovian troops briefly captured the districts of Radom and Sandomierz. With a better prepared army, Konrad II made another expedition in 1285, where the Czersk army was supported by Lesser Poland rebels gathered around the Topór family; however, Konrad II failed to take the Wawel Castle, defended by the faithful local burghers, led by Leszek II's wife Gryfina of Halych. On 3 May 1285 took place a decisive battle in Bogucice, where with the help of the Hungarians Leszek II obtained a great victory, forcing Konrad II to return to Czersk. In 1286, with the help of Lithuanian troops, he took the district of Gostynin from Władysław I the Elbow-high.

Leszek II the Black died on 30 September 1288; this event offered a new opportunity for Konrad II to ascend the throne of Kraków. This time (in a different way that in 1279) Konrad II -who was just in Ruthenia with his ally and maternal relative Vladimir III Ivan Vasilkovich, Prince of Volhynia- reacted quickly, and with the help of Vladimir III invaded Lesser Poland; however, he had to face the pretensions of another candidates for the throne: Henryk IV Probus and his own brother Bolesław II. Despite this, Konrad II didn't give up, and in 1289 (when the balance seemed to lean in favor of Henryk IV), he concluded an agreement with his brother. The exact terms of the treaty are unknown, but is assumed that in exchange of giving his support to his youngest brother for the throne of Kraków, Konrad II obtained his acceptance to the territorial division made in 1275 and also acquired Sandomierz. At the end, this treaty never came into force, because for unknown reasons Bolesław II resigned his pretensions over the Seniorate despite his victory at the Battle of Siewierz, and Konrad II was expelled from Sandomierz by the half-brother of Leszek II, Władysław I the Elbow-high, who claimed to be his rightful heir.

The events of Lesser Poland where the last political manifestation of Konrad II. He died between 23 June and 11 October 1294 in the district of Czerwińsk nad Wisłą, and was buried in either the Dominican Church of Warka (now destroyed, according to the information given by the Rodowodzie książąt polskich) or in the Abbey of Czerwińsk (according to the reports of Jan Długosz).

== Marriage and issue ==
Around 1265/70, Konrad II married with Hedwig (c. 1250/55 – aft. 1280), a daughter of Bolesław II Rogatka, Duke of Legnica. They had one daughter:

1. Anna (1270 – aft. 13 July 1324), married betw. 1289/91 to Duke Przemysław of Racibórz.

Because he died without male offspring, all his domains passed to his brother Bolesław II, against whom he had fought all his life.

Preceded by Siemowit I	Duke of Masovia; 1264–1294	Succeeded by Bolesław II
