= Euphemia of Greater Poland =

Euphemia of Greater Poland (Polish: Eufemia Odonicówna) (c. 1230 – 15 February after 1281), was a Polish princess member of the House of Piast from the Greater Poland branch and by marriage was Duchess of Kalisz, Wieluń and Opole-Racibórz.

Euphemia was the youngest child of Władysław Odonic and his wife Jadwiga, disputed daughter of Mestwin I, Duke of Pomerania and Swinisław, daughter of Mieszko III the Old.

Euphemia's date of birth is unknown. In literature it claims Euphemia was born around 1230. It is most likely she was born between (1226–1230), fitting in with the dates of birth of her siblings and dates of death of her parents.

== Marriage ==
Euphemia and her siblings married well. Her brother Przemysł I of Greater Poland married Elisabeth of Wrocław, daughter of Henry II the Pious. Another brother Bolesław the Pious married Yolanda of Poland, daughter of Béla IV of Hungary. Euphemia's only sister, Salome of Greater Poland, married Konrad I, Duke of Głogów.

Euphemia married in 1251 Władysław Opolski, son of Casimir I of Opole and Viola, Duchess of Opole. The couple was related in the fourth degree, so they needed a papal dispensation in order for the marriage to be considered valid. It is unknown whether the couple got a papal dispensation.

The marriage was to help bring closer ties between the two Piast branches and, for political reasons, to do with Euphemia's brother, Przemysł.

Władysław and Euphemia had five children:

1. Mieszko I (b. 1252/1256 – d. by 27 June 1315).
2. Casimir (b. 1253/1257 – d. 10 March 1312).
3. Bolko I (b. bef. 21 October 1258 – d. 14 May 1313).
4. Constance (b. 1256/1265 – d. by 1351), married by 1280 to Henry Probus, Duke of Wrocław; they were divorced in 1286.
5. Przemysław (b. ca. 12 June 1268 – d. 7 May 1306).

In 1258, Euphemia and her husband funded a Cistercian in Rudy. In 1281, they gave money to Premonstratensians.

Euphemia died on 15 February during a year after 1281, apparently in 1287. She is buried in Silesia

== Ancestors ==
Mieszko III the Old
Odon of Poznań
Elizabeth of Hungary
Władysław Odonic
Yaroslav Osmomysl
Viacheslavna Yaroslavna
Euphemia of Greater Poland
Mestwin I, Duke of Pomerania
Jadwiga
Mieszko III the Old
Swinisław of Greater Poland
Evdokia of Kiev
