= Anna of Racibórz =

Polish noblewoman

- Anna raciborska
- Born: 1292/1298
- Died: 1340
- Resting place: Dominican monastery of Racibórz
- Occupations: Princess and Duchess of Opawa
- Spouse: Nicholas II, Duke of Opava
- Children: 6
- Parent(s): Duke Przemysław of Racibórz and Anna of Masovia

Anna of Racibórz (Polish: Anna raciborska; 1292/98 – 1 January/21 August 1340), was a Polish princess member of the House of Piast in the Racibórz branch and by marriage Duchess of Opawa and Racibórz.

She was the daughter of Duke Przemysław of Racibórz and Anna of Masovia, daughter of Duke Konrad II of Masovia.

== Life ==
In 1318 Anna married Duke Nicholas II of Opava, illegitimate grandson of King Ottokar II of Bohemia. She bore her husband six children, one son and five daughters:

- Jan I, who later inherited the Duchy of Racibórz
- Euphemia, married Siemowit III of Masovia
- Elizabeth, who became a nun,
- Agnes, also a nun
- Anna, by marriage Burgravine of Magdeburg
- Margaret of Opava, married John Henry of Moravia

In 1336, after the death of her only brother Leszek, Anna's husband was invested with the Duchy of Racibórz (he claimed the succession as the next male relative of the late Duke) after the arbitral decision of King John of Bohemia, despite the strong resistance of the next blood male relatives of Leszek.

Anna died four years later between January–August 1340 and was probably buried in the Dominican monastery of Racibórz.
