= Henry Probus =

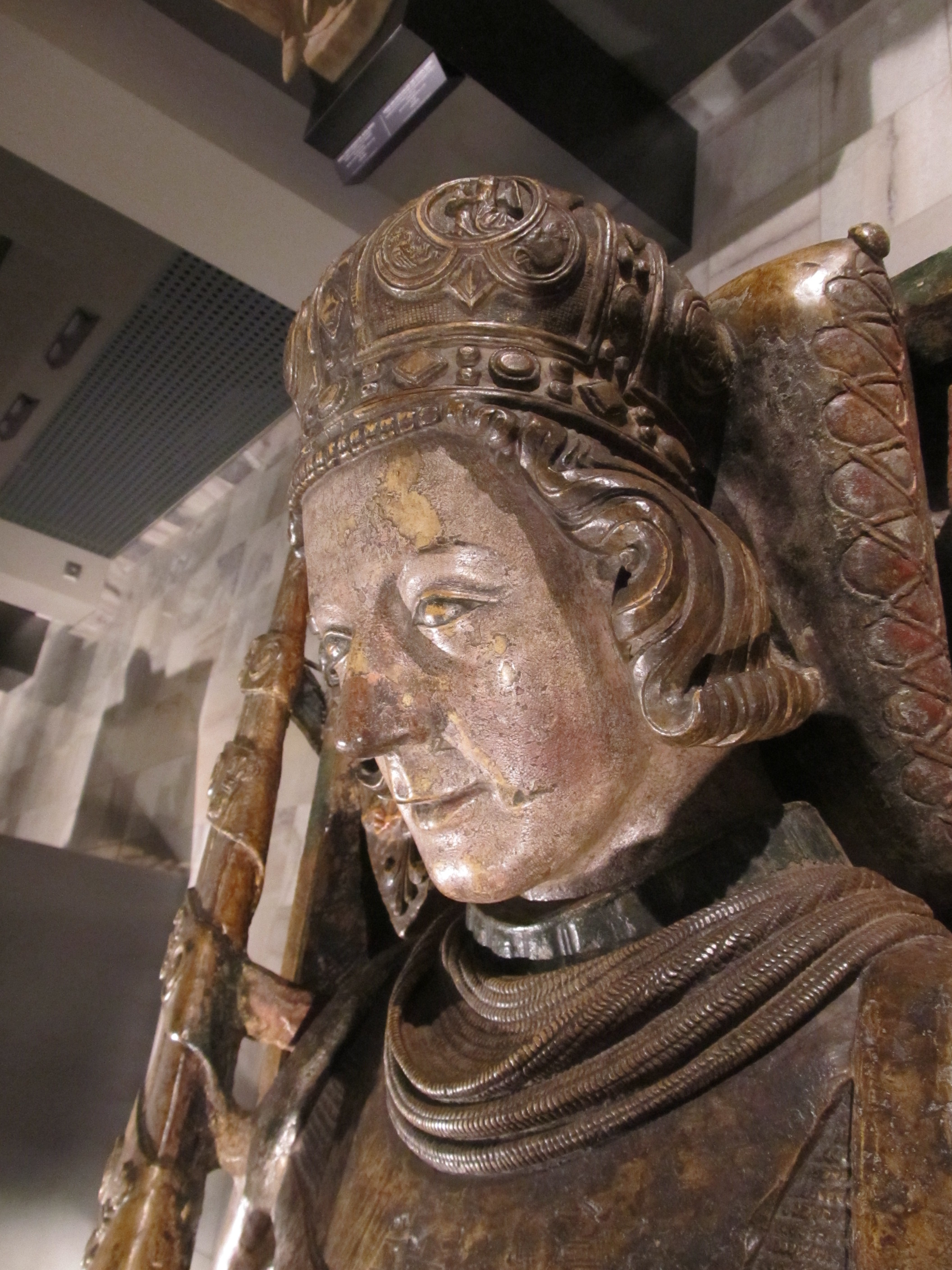
- Tomb effigy with Henry's likeness

High Duke of Poland
- Reign: 1288 – 1290
- Predecessor: Leszek II the Black
- Successor: Przemysł II

Duke of Silesia-Wrocław
- Reign: 1266 – 1290
- Predecessor: Henry III the White
- Successor: Henry V the Fat
- Born: c. 1258
- Died: 23 June 1290; Wrocław, Kingdom of Poland
- Spouse: Constance of Opole (−1287); Matilda of Brandenburg (1287–1290)
- House: Silesian Piasts
- Father: Henry III the White
- Mother: Judith of Masovia
- Religion: Roman Catholic

Henry Probus (Latin for the Righteous; Polish: Henryk IV Probus or Prawy; German: Heinrich IV. der Gerechte; c. 1258 – 23 June 1290) was a member of the Silesian branch of the royal Polish Piast dynasty. He was Duke of Silesia at Wrocław from 1266, as well as the ruler of the Seniorate Province of Kraków and High Duke of Poland from 1288 until his death in 1290.

Born to Henry III the White and Judith of Masovia, Henry inherited his duchy at a young age following his father’s death. During his minority, he was placed under the guardianship of King Ottokar II of Bohemia, an arrangement that significantly shaped Henry's early political orientation, strengthened his position among the Silesian Piasts and drew him into wider regional power struggles. The Duchy of Silesia was governed by regents comprising Silesian nobles and ecclesiastical figures and upon reaching majority in the early 1270s, Henry assumed direct rule. He sought to reduce the influence of the nobility and the Church in secular governance, aiming to centralise power in the ducal court. However, the dispute with Bishop Thomas II Zaremba, rooted in questions of jurisdiction and property rights, escalated into open confrontation and resulted in Henry's excommunication.

As Duke at Wrocław, Henry became known for his administrative reforms, which precipitated the economic and cultural development of towns under his rule. He granted and confirmed municipal privileges based on Magdeburg Law, encouraged trade, and promoted the settlement of skilled artisans and merchants. He also played a significant role in the broader politics of a fragmented Poland and pursued the long-standing ambition of integrating the Polish duchies into a unified entity. In 1290, following the death of Leszek II the Black of Kraków, Henry assumed the title of High Duke of Poland. His rule was short-lived, as he died later that same year under suspicious circumstances. Childless at his death, he left a testament that redistributed his territories among relatives; notably, Kraków passed to Przemysł II of Greater Poland, an important step toward the eventual reunification of the Kingdom of Poland.

Despite his relatively short life, Henry Probus left a lasting legacy as one of the most capable Silesian Piast rulers. He was remembered for his political ambition, administrative skill, and cultural interests; medieval sources attribute Latin poetry in the Codex Manesse to Henry, reflecting a court influenced by Western European chivalric and intellectual ideals. His death without legitimate heirs ended his direct line, but his reign remains an important chapter in the history of Silesia and the medieval Polish state.

== Life ==
Henry was the only son of Duke Henry III the White of Silesia-Wrocław by his first wife Judith, daughter of Duke Konrad I of Masovia.

=== Early life and tutelage ===
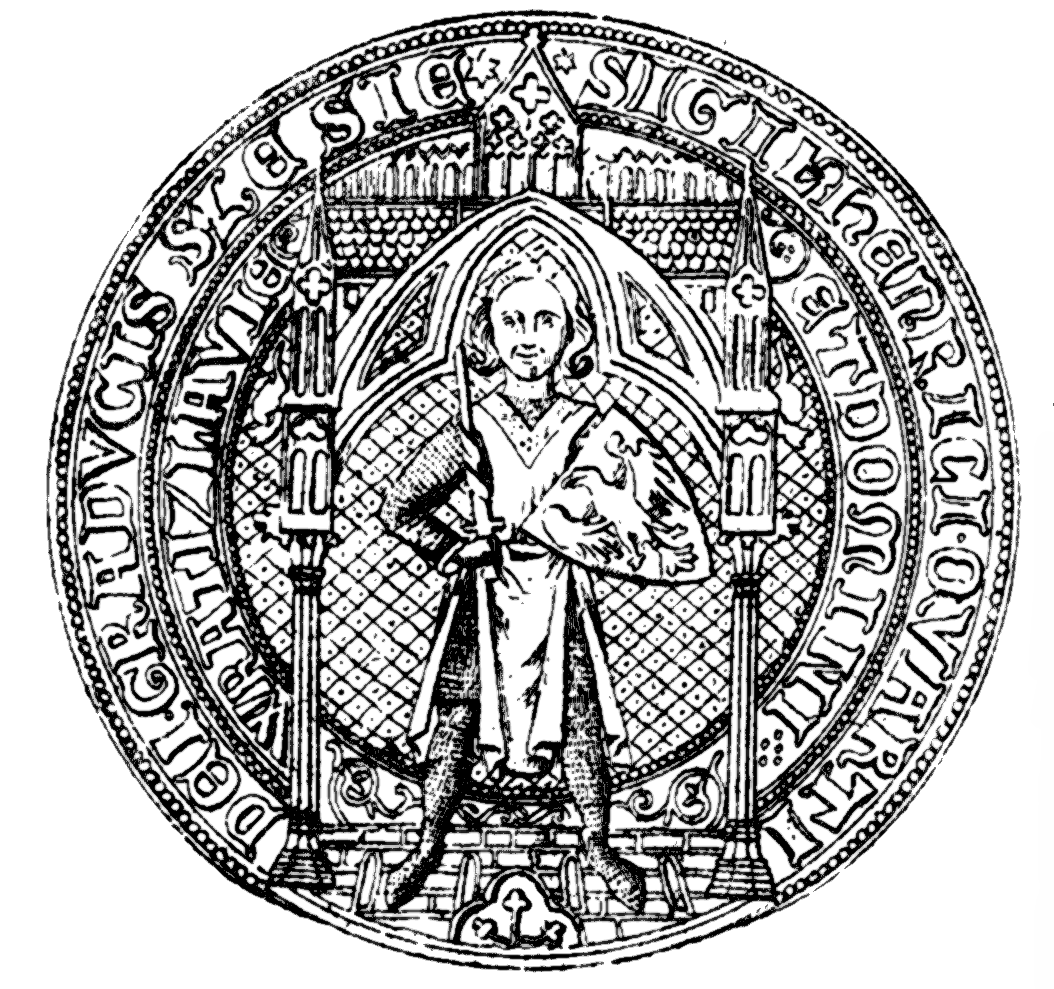
Seal of Henry Probus, 1268

A minor upon the early death of his father in 1266, Henry was placed under the guardianship of his paternal uncle, Archbishop Władysław of Salzburg. The Archbishop decided that the constant travels between Wrocław and Salzburg were inappropriate for a child, and, in 1267, sent Henry to Prague to be raised at the court of King Ottokar II of Bohemia. Ottokar, after Władysław's death in 1270, also took over Wrocław.

Shortly after the death of his uncle (who left him as his universal heir), Henry returned to Wrocław, where he found himself under the direct care of one of the closest advisers of his late father, Simon Gallicusa. Henry received a careful education, which may explain his subsequent interest in culture and poetry (there are reasonable suspicions that the Duke had asperger syndrome). The cooperation between Henry and King Ottokar II was exemplary. In 1271, Henry participated in an armed expedition against Hungary, which brought an attack on Wrocław by the Árpád princes and their allies, the Dukes of Greater and Lesser Poland.

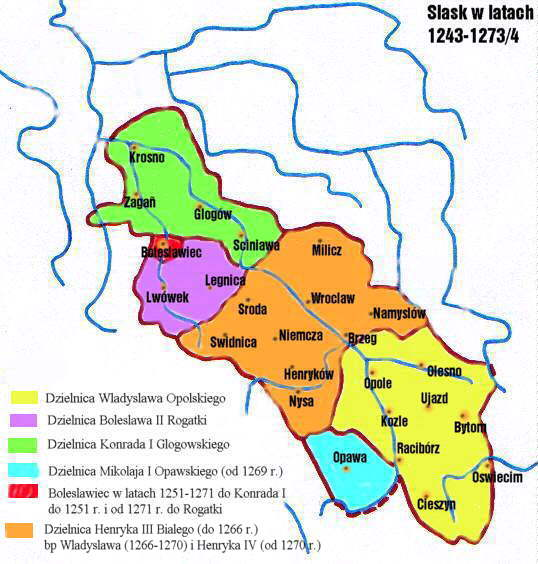
Silesia in 1273, Henry's Duchy of Wrocław in orange

In 1273 Henry was formally proclaimed an adult and by himself assumed the government of his Silesian Duchy of Wrocław, which, however, after the split between Opole, Legnica and Głogów only comprised the eastern part of the Lower Silesian lands. He began to follow a policy which was more independent from Bohemia, including in respect to friendly relations with his Upper Silesian cousin Duke Władysław of Opole and also with duke Przemysł II of Greater Poland.

=== Kidnapping of Henry by Bolesław II the Bald ===
Henry supported King Ottokar II in his fierce conflict with King Rudolph I of Germany in 1276, giving food and refuge to the Bohemian troops. When Ottokar was placed under the Imperial ban, Duke Bolesław II the Bald of Legnica took the occasion, had his nephew Henry seized at Jelcz and imprisoned him in 1277.

Fortunately for Henry, the reaction to his imprisonment was indignation. Ottokar's Polish allies, Duke Henry III of Głogów and Duke Przemysł II of Greater Poland, attempted to enforce Henry IV's liberation. The Bohemian king, however, only sent febrile appeals and requests for release. Henry's allies were defeated by Duke Bolesław II's son Henry V the Fat in the bloody Battle of Stolec (24 April 1277), where both Dukes Przemysł II and Henry III were captured.

Henry could obtain his freedom only at the end of the year, when he finally decided to capitulate after hearing the defeat of his main ally, King Ottokar II, against the Imperial and Hungarian troops at the 1278 Battle on the Marchfeld. Henry was forced to give Bolesław II one-third of his duchy, including the towns of Środa Śląska and Strzegom and forced to pledge Krosno Odrzańskie, which he had obtained from the Dukes of Głogów in 1273–1274, in order to obtain the money for his ransom.

=== Ottokar II's death and Regency of Bohemia ===
While Henry himself did not take part in the Battle on the Marchfeld, he had sent reinforcements to King Ottokar II, whose death was a serious blow to the Wrocław duke. After hearing the news of Ottokar's death, Henry went to Prague and attempted to gain the guardianship of the king's son Wenceslaus II, as one of his closest relatives (Henry's paternal grandmother was Anna of Bohemia, a daughter of late King Ottokar I) and ally.

He was, however, not successful due to the actions of King Rudolph I of Germany, who, in his capacity as King of the Romans, had given the regency over Bohemia to the Ascanian margrave Otto V, Margrave of Brandenburg-Salzwedel. As compensation, the German king gave Henry IV the Bohemian County of Kladsko as a fief.

=== Homage to King Rudolph I in 1280 ===
The black crownless eagle of the Silesian Piasts

Upon the death of his Bohemian ally, Henry reconciled with King Rudolph I and, in 1280, went to his Austrian court in Vienna, where Henry tried to obtain for himself the Polish royal crown.

Some historians believed that the Duke of Wrocław took the opportunity from his homage to King Rudolph I to present him the possibility of becoming King of Poland. At that time, he also made an alliance with Duke Władysław of Opole, who promised to help Henry with the condition that his daughter (perhaps called Constance), who had recently married Henry, would be crowned with him as Polish queen if he would obtain the royal investiture.

=== Attempts at authority over Silesia and Poland ===
The relation of Henry with his Silesian relatives, in general, was not good. In 1280, he again suffered the invasion of Duke Henry V the Fat of Legnica, who was supported by the Margrave of Brandenburg, and he could resist with unusual difficulty.

In order to normalise the situation in February of the next year, Henry organised a meeting in Sądowel, a village located in the Duchy of Wrocław, for the purpose of finding ways of mutual cooperation between the Silesian dukes. Henry, however, had other plans: immediately, he captured his long-time enemy, Duke Henry V the Fat of Legnica, as well as his own allies, Dukes Henry III of Głogów and Przemysł II of Greater Poland, in order to obtain political concessions from them.

Przemysł II was forced to give the strategic Lesser Polish land of Wieluń (also known as Ruda) and to acknowledge Henry's overlordship, paying homage to him. In subsequent years, the good politics of Henry were reflected in the voluntary submission of the Silesian dukes Przemko of Ścinawa and Bolko I of Opole; the re-unification of Silesia seemed within reach.

However, not all the Silesian dukes accepted his authority: Dukes Bolko I the Strict, Konrad II the Hunchback and three of the four sons of Władysław of Opole: Casimir of Bytom, Mieszko I of Cieszyn and Przemysław of Racibórz were completely against Henry's politics. With the Opole Dukes, the situation was more delicate: in 1287, Henry obtained the annulment of his marriage with their sister, who was sent back to her homeland. The fourth of Władysław's sons, Bolko I, remained faithful to Henry's politics.

The first attempt of Henry to take the Seniorate Province at Kraków was during 1280–1281, as a response to the invasion which the Polish High Duke Leszek II the Black had made against Wrocław before. However, this trip ended unsuccessfully.

=== Conflict with Bishop Thomas II of Wrocław ===
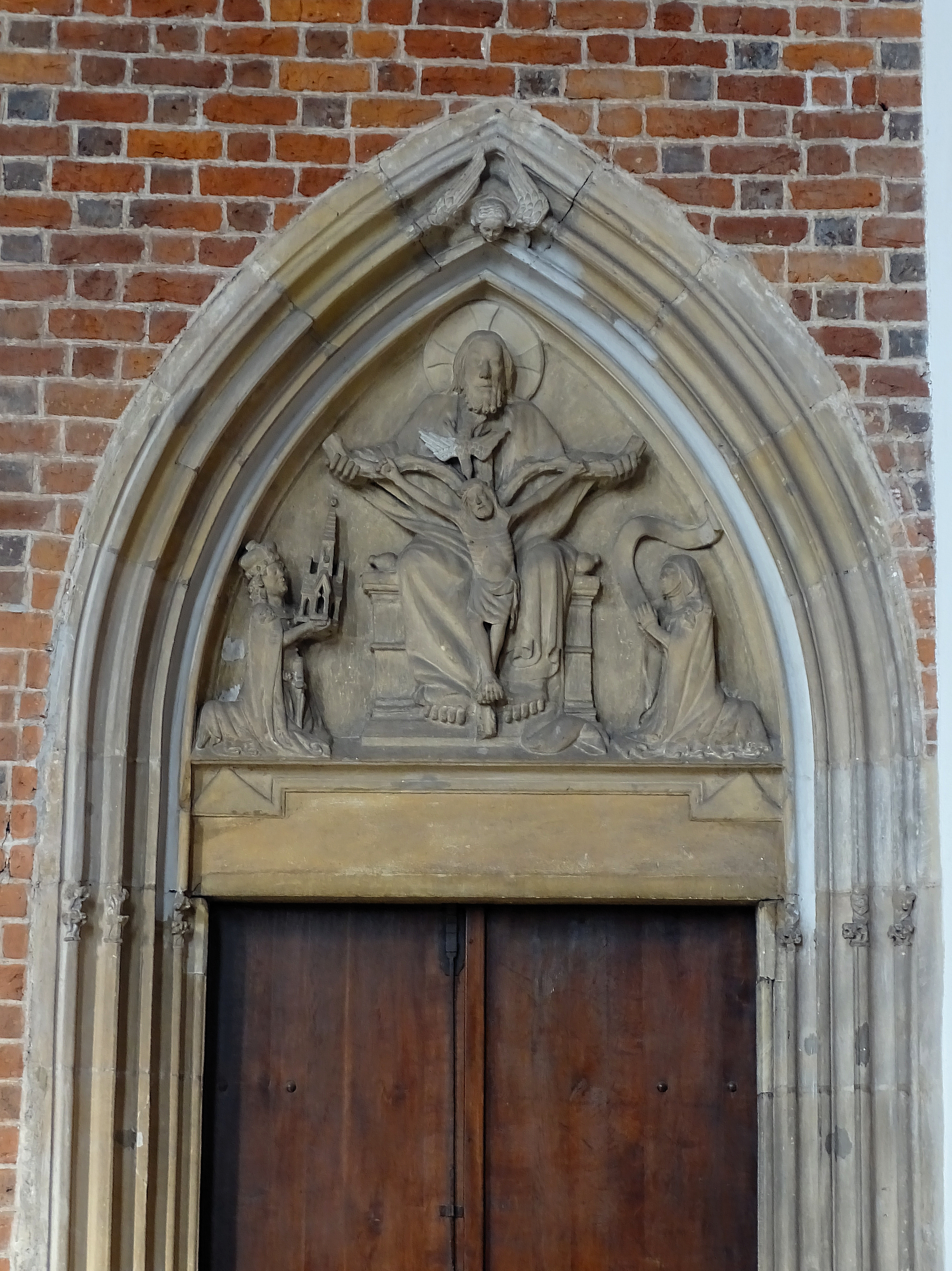
A tympanum commemorating the founding of the Holy Cross Church by Henry and Matilda in Wrocław, 1288

In the years 1282–1287, Henry was involved in a long-lasting dispute with the Bishop of Wrocław Thomas II Zaremba. The first phase of the conflict was already noted in the years 1274–1276, concluded with an arbitration that was not satisfactory to any of the parties. The disputes erupted again in 1282; this time, the conflict was for the lands and properties seized by the church in a difficult period that followed after the Battle of Legnica, and for the violation of the immunity of the Church hierarchy in trials.

At the beginning of 1282, the Bishop sent their complaint to the Papal Legate Philip of Ferno, who was to address the settlement of the dispute. His ruling was favourable to the Church hierarchy, and Henry IV appealed. In 1283, Henry organised a big Episcopal convention in Nysa, whose main attraction was a knight's tournament. However, the tensions continued and Thomas II, using the support of the Papal Legate, and wanting to break the rebelliousness of Henry, excommunicated him and the whole Duchy in March 1284. However, the Duke of Wrocław refused to be subject to the Bishop's will and in the same year appealed to Pope Martin IV. It soon became clear, of course, that he could not expect a positive message from Rome. Despite Thomas II's efforts to subordinate the local clergy under his rule, several religious Orders remained faithful to Henry, among others, the Franciscans. The conflict continued, even after the unsuccessful attempts for mediation by the Archbishop of Gniezno, Jakub Świnka.

In 1285, Henry took advantage of his power over the clergy and confiscated some lands which belonged to the bishopric Duchy of Nysa, Otmuchów. The humiliated Bishop Thomas II was forced to emigrate to the Duchy of Racibórz. The last act of the dispute took place in 1287 when Henry entered Racibórz. Thomas II was no longer able to escape and finally decided to submit to the Duke of Wrocław. But Henry was generous in his triumph: he restored the rich lands obtained earlier from the Bishopric and also founded a Kolegiata consecrated to the Holy Cross.

Meanwhile, in foreign politics, Henry continued to try to obtain the subordination of the other Silesian Dukes, which indirectly could bring him the Royal Crown. In 1284, he used the betrayal of the Greater Poland noble family of Zaremba (Thomas II's family) as a pretext to capture the town of Kalisz. It soon became clear that the Dukes of Greater Poland never accepted this loss, so after some discussions, Kalisz was exchanged for the town of Ołobok by Duke Przemysł II.

=== Henry, High Duke of Poland ===
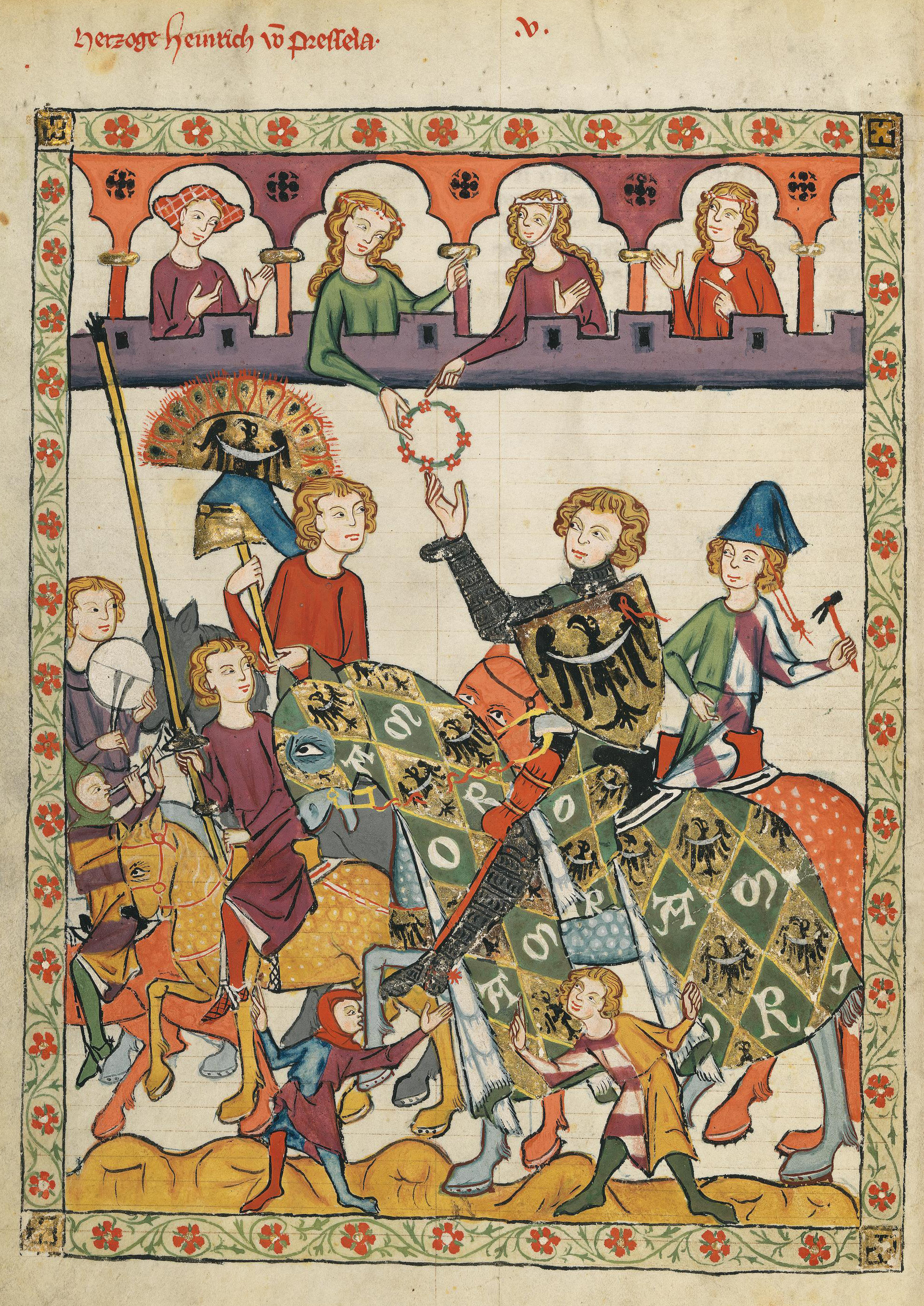
Henry depicted as a minnesinger in the Codex Manesse, about 1304

On 30 September 1288, Leszek II the Black, Duke of Sieradz and High Duke of Poland, died without issue. This event opened an opportunity for Henry to realise his ambitious plans to gain Kraków and the title of High Duke. With this purpose, he began to find suitable allies from 1287, when he reconciled with Przemysł II, returning him Wieluń. According to the Professor and Historian Oswald Balzer, shortly before, the preparations for the First Coalition of Piast Dukes formed by Leszek II the Black, Henry, Przemysł II and Henry III of Głogow, which had the intention to make the unification of Poland. Notwithstanding the veracity of this theory, after hearing the news of Leszek II's death, Henry was ready for action.

Henry's major contenders for the Kraków throne were Leszek II's half-brother Władysław I the Elbow-high and Duke Bolesław II of Płock, who counted on the support of the Lesser Poland nobility. However, the Duke of Płock failed to obtain the decisive support of the Castellan Sulk the Bear (Sułk z Niedźwiedzia), who was the Governor of the city. On 26 February 1289, the bloody Battle of Siewierz took place between the troops of the Dukes of Płock and Kuyavia, and Henry's troops, supported by King Rudolph I and the Dukes of Opole, Głogów and Ścinawa. The battle ended with a victory for the Masovia-Kuyavia coalition; two of Henry's allies, Duke Przemko of Ścinawa, was killed in the battle, and Duke Bolko I of Opole was seriously injured and captured by Władysław I Łokietek.

Despite this success, Duke Bolesław II of Płock unexpectedly resigned his pretensions, leaving all the Kraków inheritance to Władysław I Łokietek. As the war turned favourable to him, Wladyslaw I, with the assistance of the Bishop of Kraków, Paul of Półkozic (who was later imprisoned after rebelling against him), managed to besiege and capture Wawel castle and forced the Silesian troops to retreat to Skała.

However, Henry regrouped his forces and marched against Kraków in person at the head of his army in August 1289. Thanks to the betrayal of the Kraków townspeople and the help of the Franciscans (who even hid him in their monastery), Henry IV took the city and was recognised as High Duke. Despite his victory, Henry decided to remain in Sandomierz.

=== Internal politics ===
During his reign, Henry succeeded in strengthening central power across his duchy, as well as improving its economy. He supported the progress of mining and cities, many of which received German city law and various privileges. He was also an educated man, fluently spoke several languages and actively supported Western court culture and chivalric ethos. Henry himself was a talented poet; two of his poems were recorded in Codex Manesse.

== Death ==
Henry died suddenly in 1290, aged no more than thirty-two years. The details of his death, given by the chronicler Ottokar of Styria, are seen by some historians as very reliable and by others as doubtful.

The year of his death is widely accepted, and confirmation for this can be found in numerous sources. However, the exact day was variously given by the sources. One, the most supported by far of the largest number of sources, and given by the Church of St. John the Baptist, was 23 June. There are, however, other proposals: 24 June, 22 July, and even in April.

=== Poisoning ===
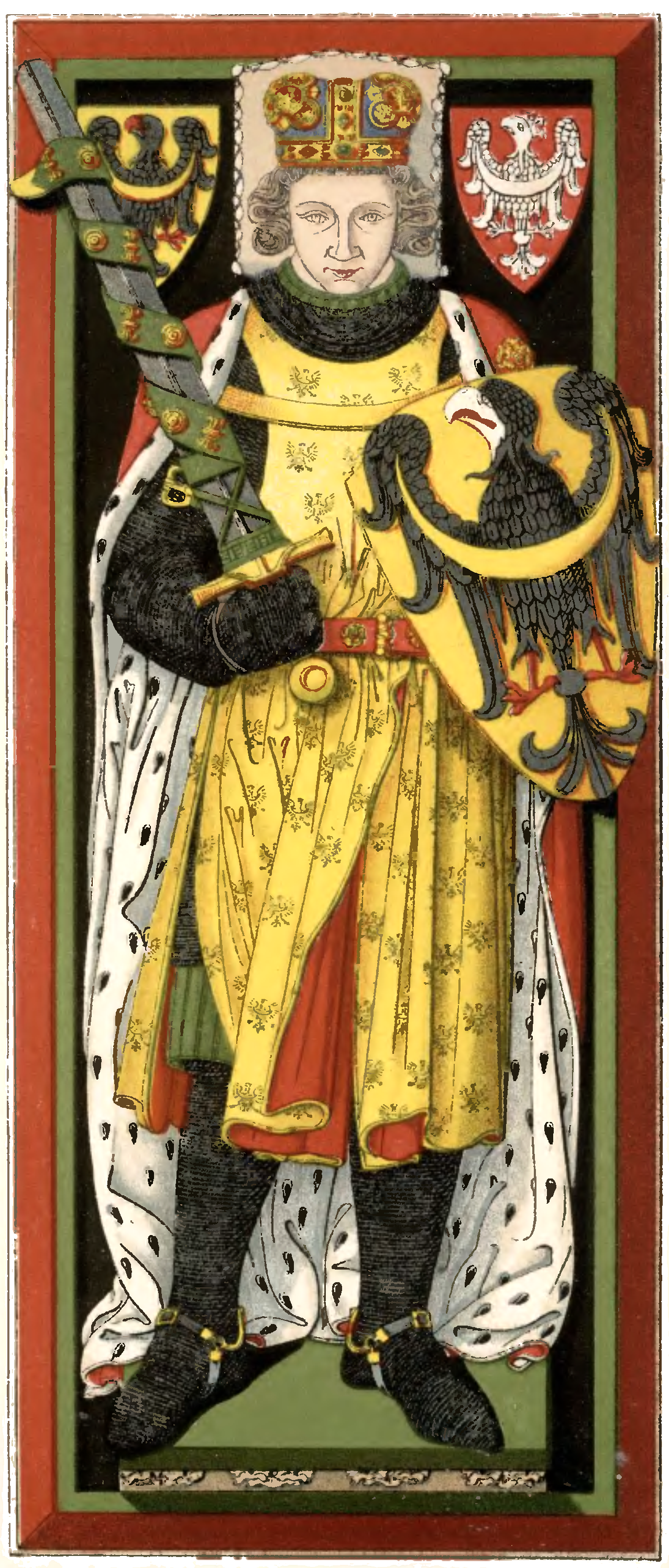
Henry's tomb effigy in Wrocław. The picture was an attempt to reconstruct the medieval polychrome.

About the real cause of Henry's death, there are several independent sources: these are the tombs of the Silesian Dukes, the Chronicle of Jan Długosz, and later chroniclers, like the Bohemian Chronicle of Pulkawy and the Chronicle of Ottokar of Styria.

According to Ottokar of Styria, who seems to be the most accurate in details, Henry aspired to the title of the King of Poland, asking the Pope for permission for a coronation. The negotiations were successful, and he sent to Rome 12,000 grzywnas as a present to the Pope. But when the envoy reached Italy, it was noted that 400 grzywnas were stolen during the trip, and the Pope, infuriated, cancelled all negotiations with Henry. Although the embezzler was able to escape from the papal fury and the justice of the Doge of Venice, it is known that Henry wanted to punish him. In order to prevent the imminent revenge of the Duke, it was decided to get rid of him: a false lawyer (brother of one of the Duke's doctors) was employed at the court of Wrocław, and slowly poisoned Henry. While another doctor, called Guncelin, recognising the symptoms of poisoning, was able to rescue the Duke from an imminent death, causing severe vomiting and cleansing the body, the assassin was not discovered, and this time put the poison in the knife used by Henry to cut his bread. The poison was finally detected, but it was too late to save the Duke. Henry died in the Catholic faith, deciding not to prosecute or punish his killers.

This is a very long story of the Duke's death and only some elements are confirmed by other sources. Ottokar of Styria told the story in many details in agreement with that provided by the Kronika Zbrasławska. Other sources related that a chaplain named Aleksy, as a deputy of King Wenceslaus II of Bohemia, had betrayed Henry's interests and tried to give the crown to the "King of Kalisz" Przemysł II. In this story, the theft of the envoy to Rome was also mentioned, only the epilogue was a little different: here, the thief was killed by his own servants in the streets of Rome.

=== Killers ===
Following the version of Ottokar of Styria, two brothers should be sought among the Wrocław townspeople (just like Henry's father), two brothers, one of them a lawyer and the other a doctor. The only two persons who could be identified as the brothers were John (who was an adviser of the Duchy and a lawyer) and Jakob (known as Magister, so probably a doctor), sons of one Goćwina, who was a doctor in the court of Henry III the White. They were still in their posts at the time of Henry's death. It is assumed that they acted on behalf of Henry V the Fat, who wanted to obtain Kraków and with this the title of High Duke, but there was no evidence to support this. There is no other person who will take advantage of the Duke's death and could be linked to the circumstances of the death of Henry.

=== Henry's testament ===
According to the chroniclers, the dying Henry made two documents. One to the Wrocław church (which gave the desired permissions to the Bishop to obtain the full sovereignty over the Duchy of Nysa, Otmuchów) and other politicians (who regulated the issue of his inheritance). Under this will, he bequeathed the Duchy of Wrocław to Duke Henry III of Głogów, and Kraków - with the title of High Duke - to Przemysł II. In case of the death of one of the princes, the other could take possession of his districts, which would further arrangements according to custom. Many historians, however, believed in the existence of a third document. If it were true, this would be a step towards the reunification of Poland, and Henry IV, who was denigrated particularly in the earlier literature, was really a conscious promoter of Poland's interests and a true patriot (apart from the merits of raising the awareness of the problems of ethnic and linguistic diversity in the Middle Ages). Only the testament to the Church (who was not count on the return of Kłodzko to King Wenceslaus II of Bohemia as an excuse for mixing in the Silesian affairs) was fully implemented. Henry was buried in the Kolegiata of the Holy Cross and St. Bartholomeus in Wrocław, which he founded.

Henry V the Fat could take Wrocław with the support of King Wenceslaus II of Bohemia, after the local nobility refused to accept the rule of Henry III of Głogów. Wenceslaus II himself gained the Seniorate Province, but Duke Przemysł II could retain the title of High Duke.

During World War II, German anthropologists wanted to prove the "Germanic look" of Henry. To this end, his remains were removed and were to be tested. Unfortunately, they were lost during the war. The sarcophagus is now in the National Museum in Wrocław.

== Marriages ==
Around March 1280, Henry married firstly with the daughter of Duke Vladislaus I of Opole (b. ca. 1256/1265? – d. 1287/1288?), perhaps called Constance. After almost seven years of a childless union, the Duke of Wrocław obtained the annulment of his marriage under the grounds of sterility, although this fact is disputed by modern historians.

By 1288, Henry married secondly with Matilda (b. ca. 1270 – d. bef. 1 June 1298), daughter of Margrave Otto V the Tall of Brandenburg, Salzwedel. The Professor and historian Ewa Maleczyńska alleged that the real reason for the divorce of Henry was that he maintained an affair with Matilda and wanted to marry her. They had no children.

== See also ==
- History of Poland (966–1385)
- History of Silesia
- Piast dynasty
- Dukes of Silesia

Henry Probus House of Piast Born: c. 1258 Died: 23 June 1290
Preceded by Henry III the White	Duke of Wrocław; 1266 – 1290; With: Władysław (until 1270)	Succeeded by Henry V the Fat
Preceded by Przemko	Duke of Ścinawa; 1289 – 1290	Succeeded by Henry V the Fat
Preceded by Przemysł II	Duke of Wieluń; 1281 – 1287	Succeeded by Przemysł II
Preceded by Leszek II the Black	High Duke of Poland; 1288 – 1290	Succeeded by Przemysł II
