= Mieszko I, Duke of Cieszyn =

Duke of Cieszyn

Mieszko I
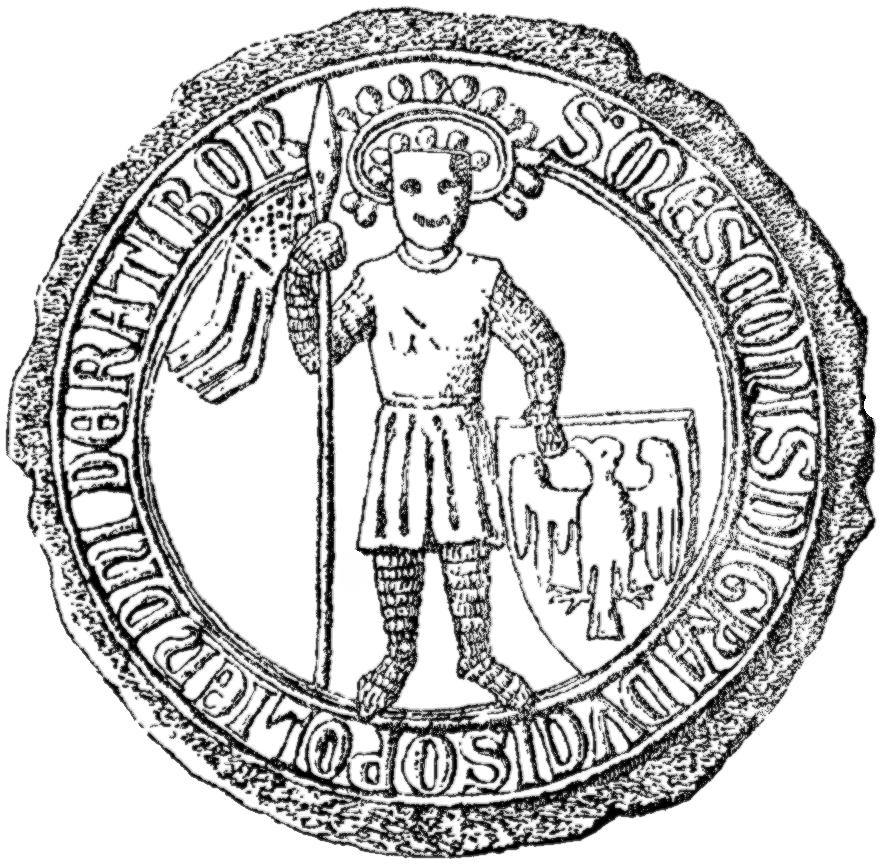
- Mieszko I's seal, dated to 1288.
- Born: 1252/56
- Died: 27 June 1315
- Noble family: Silesian Piasts of Opole
- Spouse: ?Grzymisława Vsevolodovna of Belz
- Issue: Władysław; Casimir I Viola Elisabeth of Cieszyn
- Father: Władysław Opolski
- Mother: Euphemia of Greater Poland

Mieszko I of Cieszyn (Polish: Mieszko cieszyński, Czech: Měšek I. Těšínský, German: Mesko I (Teschen); also known as Mieszko I of Opole; 1252/56 – by 27 June 1315), was a Duke of Racibórz during 1282–1290 (with his brother as co-ruler) and the first Duke of Cieszyn since 1290 until his death.

He was the oldest son of Władysław, Duke of Opole-Racibórz, by his wife Euphemia, daughter of Władysław Odonic, Duke of Greater Poland.

== Life ==
=== Early years ===
Little is known about the early years of Mieszko I's life. His first documented mention was on 21 October 1258, when he appears together with his father and two younger brothers in the consent of the foundation of a Cistercian abbey in Rudy.

=== Duke of Racibórz ===
After his father's death in 1282, and according to the custom during the fragmentation of Poland, Mieszko and his brothers divided the Duchy of Opole-Racibórz between them: Mieszko and his youngest brother Przemysław received together the district of Racibórz as co-rulers. The other two brothers, Casimir and Bolko I, received Opole. Because Przemysław was still a minor at that time, Mieszko ruled alone until he attained his majority, in 1284.

In 1285 Mieszko politically supported the Bishop of Wrocław, Thomas II Zaremba against Henry IV Probus, providing shelter to the Bishop in Raciborz. His politics against Henry IV were reinforced when the Duke of Wrocław repudiated his wife Constance —sister of Mieszko— and sent her back to her homeland. Another consequence of Mieszko's politics was an armed expedition of Henry IV in 1287 against Racibórz, who was sieged. Then Mieszko was forced to refuse his help to the Bishop.

=== Duke of Cieszyn ===
In 1290 the division was made of the Duchy of Racibórz: Przemysław retained Racibórz and Mieszko obtained the rule over the districts of Cieszyn, Oświęcim and Zator. The first time that he signed himself as Duke of Cieszyn was on 1 January 1290.

In internal politics he pursued vigorous policies. Mieszko carried out intensive colonizing policies and founded many settlements. He also gave city rights to several towns: Cieszyn, Oświęcim (in 1291), Bielsko, Skoczów and Fryštát. On 10 November 1292 he granted the city rights to Zator.

=== Struggles for the Throne of Kraków ===
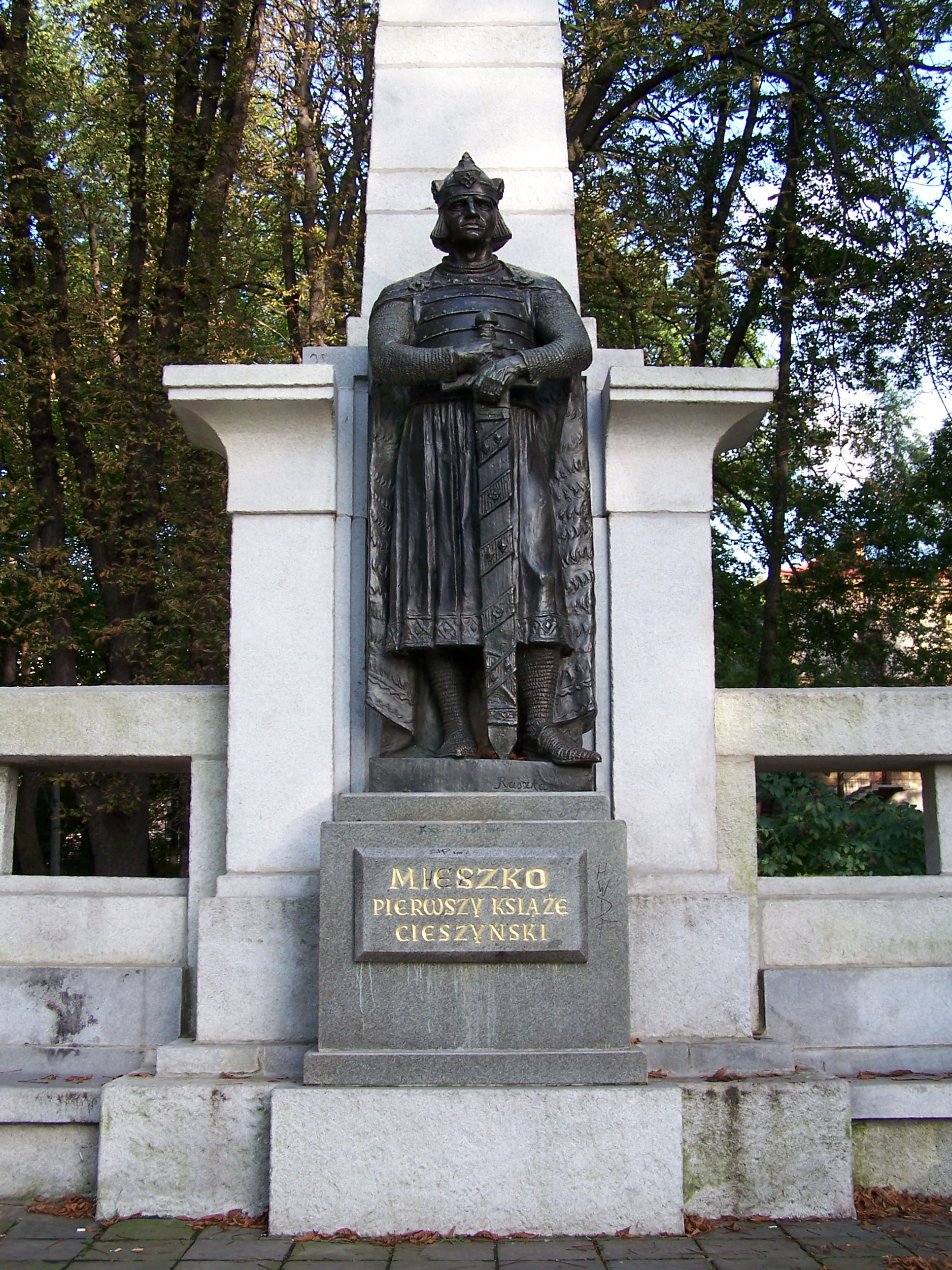
Mieszko I monument in Cieszyn. Sculpted by Jan Raszka.

Mieszko refused to support any of the Piast pretenders to the Polish throne (Henry IV Probus, Przemysł II and Władysław I the Elbow-high). Instead he stood alongside King Wenceslaus II of Bohemia. On 17 January 1291 the formal agreement was signed in Olomouc which formed the alliance between the Bohemian Kingdom, Mieszko and his two brothers Casimir and Przemysław. Mieszko eventually swore homage to King Wenceslaus II, although the exact date was still debatable; the most accepted date by historians was 11 August 1292.

Despite his alliance, Mieszko didn't take an active part in Wenceslaus II's campaign against Władysław I the Elbow-high in 1292; however, he put his army at the King's disposal and later took part in the Battle of Siewierz. Mieszko was present at the coronation of Wenceslaus II as King of Poland in Gniezno in 1300. After the death of Wenceslaus II in 1305, Mieszko continued to support the Přemyslid dynasty in the person of Wenceslaus III, son and successor of Wenceslaus II.

On 5 October 1305, Mieszko obtained his major victory when his daughter Viola Elisabeth married King Wenceslaus III. This union was a chance for Mieszko to make himself one of the most powerful figures in Bohemia, and he even began some attempts to obtain the Polish crown.

However, Mieszko's promising career ended suddenly with the murder of Wenceslaus III (Olomouc, 4 August 1306). Viola Elisabeth never bore Wenceslaus III any children and the Přemyslid dynasty became extinct.

After 1306 the political activity of Mieszko almost disappeared. Is unknown why this happened, because at that time he was only around fifty-years-old and was still considered young enough. The government of the Duchy was increasingly absorbed by his sons Wladyslaw and Kazimierz. The only sign of his political activities during this time was the lease of the Czech city of Kęty to the Bishop of Kraków, Jan Muskata, a strong opposer to the rule of Władysław I the Elbow-high in Greater Poland. However, in contrast to his brother Bolko I, Mieszko didn't support the Rebellion of wójt Albert in 1311.

=== Donations to the Church ===
Mieszko was known for his generosity to the church. Thanks to him, the construction was completed of the Dominican convent at Oświęcim (shortly after 1283). Also, he financially assisted the monastery of Czarnowąsy near Opole and in the Dominican of Cieszyn.

=== Death ===
Mieszko's exact date of death is unknown. Diplomatic sources suggest that he died in 1314 or in the first half of 1315, before 27 June. He was probably buried in the Dominican church in Cieszyn. In 1931 the Polish painter and sculptor Jan Raszka made a sculpture of Mieszko I in Cieszyn.

== Marriage and issue ==
According to some sources, Mieszko's wife died around 1303, but her name is unknown. The Obituary of the Church of St. Vincent in Wrocław showed the existence of a certain "Grzymisława, Duchess of Opole" (Grimizlaua ducissa Opuliensis) who was buried there around 13 September 1286. Her parentage is also unknown, but her name suggests a Russian origin, probably member of the Rurikids. Her title suggests that she may have been the wife of Mieszko I or the first wife of Bolko I (Mieszko I's brother), or maybe a completely different person.

Also, the exact date of their marriage was uncertain, but after a further reconstructions of their children's birth dates, was placed between 1275 and 1280. They had three children:

1. Władysław (born 1275/80 – d. by 15 May 1324)
2. Casimir I (born 1280/90 – d. by 29 September 1358)
3. Viola Elisabeth (born ca. 1291 – d. 21 September 1317), married on 5 October 1305 to King Wenceslaus III of Bohemia

== Footnotes ==
Regnal titles
Preceded by Władysław	Duke of Racibórz; 1282–1290 with Przemysław	Succeeded by Przemysław
Vacant Title last held by Viola	Duke of Cieszyn; 1290–1315	Succeeded by Casimir I
