= Przemysław of Racibórz =

Duke of Raciborz

Przemysław
- Coat-of-arms of Upper Silesia (Cieszyn, Bytom, Strzelce, Racibórz)
- Born: between 21 October 1258 and 12 June 1268
- Died: May 7, 1306 (aged 37)
- Buried: Dominican monastery of St. Jakob in Racibórz
- Noble family: Silesian Piasts
- Spouse: Anna of Masovia
- Issue: Leszek of Racibórz; Anna of Racibórz; Euphemia of Racibórz
- Father: Władysław
- Mother: Euphemia of Greater Poland

Przemysław of Racibórz (Polish: Przemysław raciborski) (between 21 October 1258 and 12 June 1268 – 7 May 1306) was a Duke of Racibórz since 1282 until his death (until 1290 with his brother as co-ruler).

He was the fourth son of Władysław, Duke of Opole-Racibórz, by his wife Euphemia, daughter of Władysław Odonic, Duke of Greater Poland. He was born between 21 October 1258 and 12 June 1268. He was not mentioned among other sons of Władysław on document from 21 October 1258. First document, where Przemysław was mentioned, is from 12 June 1268.

== Life ==
After his father's death in 1281 or 1282, Przemysław and his brother Mieszko I received the districts of Racibórz, Cieszyn and Oświęcim. In 1285, Przemysław, together with the brothers (except Bolko I) supported the Bishop Thomas II Zaremba in his fight against Henry IV Probus, Duke of Wrocław, and even the Bishop found refuge in Racibórz. In 1287 Henry IV made a retaliatory expedition against Racibórz, who was sieged and almost destroyed.

In 1290 was made the formal division of the Duchy of Racibórz. Przemysław retained the main city of Racibórz and Mieszko I obtained Cieszyn and Oświęcim. A year later, the Duke of Racibórz, together with his brothers Mieszko I and Bolko I paid homage to the King Wenceslaus II of Bohemia (the other brother, Casimir was a vassal of Bohemia since 1289). It is unknown whether Przemysław was also considered to be a vassal, but this is very likely.

In the internal politics, Przemysław made two important events in his lands: in 1299 he granted urban privileges to the city of Racibórz and founded a Dominican monastery there.

Przemysław died on 7 May 1306 and was buried in the Dominican monastery in Racibórz.

== Marriage and issue ==
Between 1289 and 1291 Przemysław married with Anna (b. no later than ca. 1270 – d. aft. 13 July 1324), daughter of Duke Konrad II of Masovia. They had at least three children:

1. Leszek (b. ca. 1292 – d. 1336).
2. Anna (b. 1292/98 – d. 1 January/21 August 1340), married in 1318 with Duke Nicholas II of Opawa.
3. Euphemia (b. 1299/1301 – d. 17 January 1359).

Is also believed that Constance, who ruled in Wodzisław Śląski until her death in 1351 was also her daughter.

Leszek, as the only son, inherited the whole duchy, except Wodzisław Śląski, who was given to his wife Anna as her dower.

== Footnotes ==
Regnal titles
Preceded by Władysław	Duke of Racibórz with Mieszko I (until 1290); 1282–1306	Succeeded by Leszek
