= Vladislaus I of Opole =

Silesian nobleman

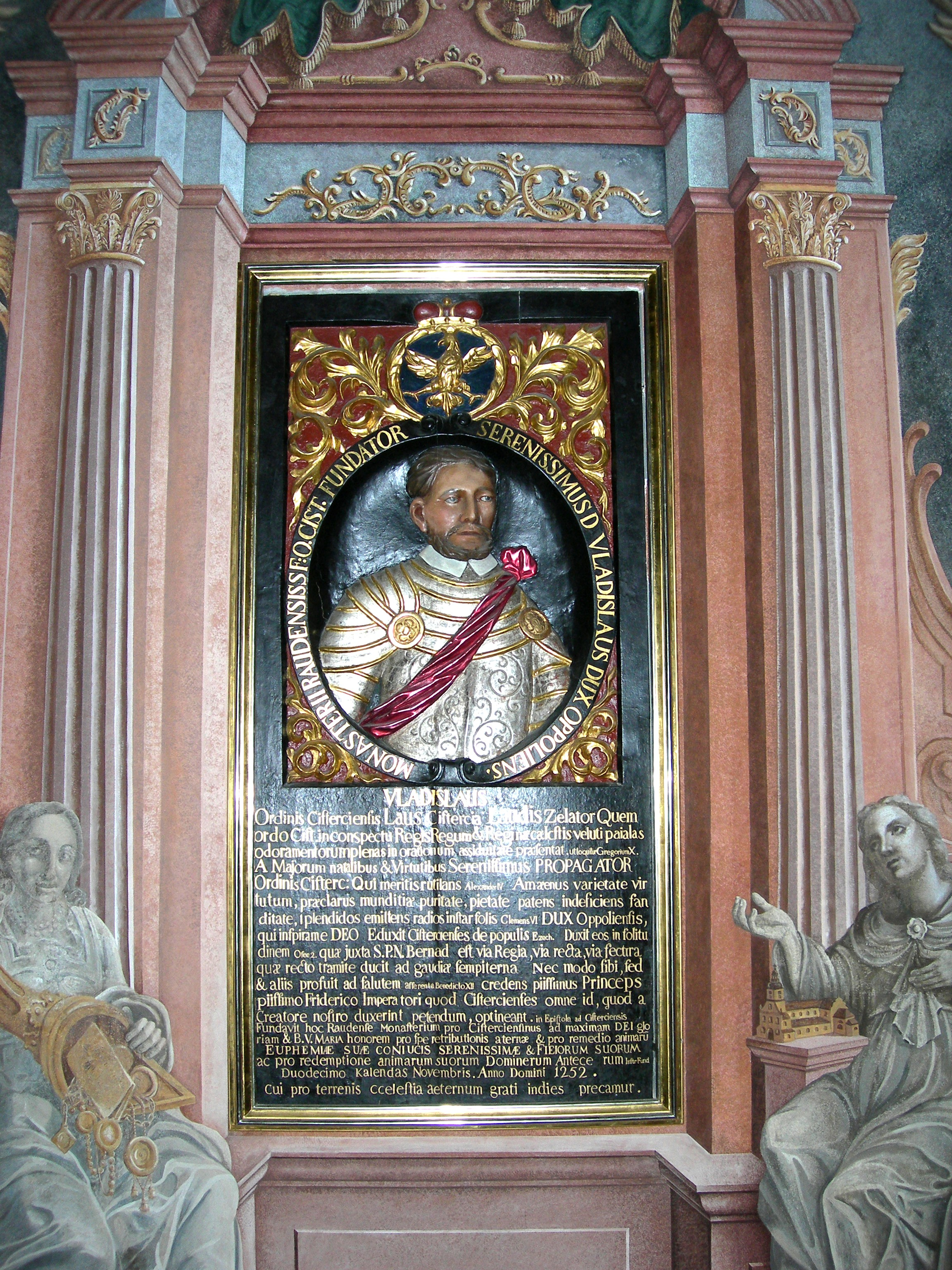
- Władysław Opolski
- Born: c. 1225
- Died: 27 August/13 September 1281/2
- Noble family: Silesian Piasts of Opole
- Spouse: Euphemia of Greater Poland
- Issue: Mieszko I, Duke of Cieszyn; Casimir of Bytom; Bolko I of Opole; Constance, Duchess of Wodzisław; Przemysław of Racibórz
- Father: Casimir I of Opole
- Mother: Viola, Duchess of Opole

Vladislaus I of Opole (Polish: Władysław opolski; c. 1225 – 27 August/13 September 1281/2) was a Duke of Kalisz during 1234–1244, Duke of Wieluń from 1234 to 1249 and Duke of Opole–Racibórz from 1246 until his death.

He was the second son of Casimir I of Opole by his wife, Viola, a Bulgarian princess.

== Life ==
At the time of his father's death in 1230, both Władysław and his older brother Mieszko II the Fat were still minors; because of this, they were placed under the care of their mother Viola and Henry I the Bearded, Duke of Wrocław. In 1234 Henry I the Bearded, wishing to take full control over Opole, moved the young dukes to Kalisz, but without denying their hereditary rights. Four years later, Mieszko II the Fat attained his majority, and Henry II the Pious (son and successor of Henry I the Bearded), was forced to give him government over Opole-Racibórz. Despite this, Władysław and his mother Viola remained in Kalisz, where she acted as regent on his behalf until 1241, when Władysław was declared an adult and able to rule by himself.

Władysław, Duke of Opole, Wieluński, Kujawski and Dobrzyński, promises to help Prince Alexander, his son-in-law.

The death of Henry II the Pious in the Battle of Legnica (1241) put in jeopardy Władysław's rule over Kalisz and Wieluń; the definite loss of these lands appeared to be only a matter of time, thanks to the pretensions of Przemysł I of Greater Poland, who wanted to recover these lands. Eventually, Władysław lost Kalisz in 1244 and Wieluń five years later in 1249.

In 1246 Mieszko II the Fat died without issue, leaving in his will all his lands to his brother Władysław. Soon after, the new duke failed to maintain in his hands the fortress of Lelów, acquired by Mieszko II three years before. Despite this bad beginning of his rule, Władysław made skillful maneuverings with the other Piast Duchies, who allowed to him to maintain his frontiers. By the first half of the 13th century, Władysław's relations with the Dukes of Greater Poland were normalized. Władysław finally gave up his claims over Kalisz and Wieluń, and as a part of his new alliance with Greater Poland, he married Euphemia, sister of Przemysł I.

Shortly after his marriage Władysław, like other Piast Dukes, entered the war between Hungary and Bohemia after the extinction of the House of Babenberg. At first, the Duke of Opole-Racibórz supported the Hungarians, supporting Bolesław V the Chaste in his attacks over Opawa and Głubczyce. However, in 1255, and for unknown reasons, Władysław changed sides and supported King Ottokar II of Bohemia, and in 1260 the duke personally took part in the Battle of Kressenbrunn against the Hungarians. This change of alliance soon brought real benefits to Władysław, in the form of regulations in the frontiers between his duchy and the Bohemian Kingdom. In 1262, at the Congress of Danków, Władysław attempted to make a triple alliance with the Bohemian King, Bolesław V the Chaste and Bolesław the Pious, one of the rulers of Greater Poland, but without significant results.

The opportunity to obtain the throne of Kraków appeared only in 1273. Władysław, despite his alliance with Bolesław V the Chaste entered Lesser Poland with some of his forces. The decisive battle took place on 4 June 1273 in Bogucin Mały, where the Opole-Racibórz army was defeated. In October of that year, Bolesław V the Chaste made a retaliatory expedition against Opole-Racibórz; however, the forces were limited only to destroy specific areas of the duchy. In 1274 Władysław and Bolesław V the Chaste decided to conclude a peace, under which the Duke of Opole-Racibórz probably gave up his claims over the throne of Kraków, in return for which the borders of both duchies were finally eliminated.

On 25 August 1278 the Battle on the Marchfeld took place, which proved to be decisive in terms of King Ottokar II's fate. Despite the successful cooperation with the Bohemian King, this time Władysław didn't send supporting troops to the King. What is more, shortly after receiving news of the Ottokar II's defeat and death, the Duke of Opole-Racibórz attacked Opawa, probably wishing to obtain it. However, the rapid normalization of the situation in Prague and the efficient rule of the regency on behalf of the minor King Wenceslaus II clashed with his intentions. To normalize his now tense relations with the Bohemian Kingdom, Władysław was present in the Congress of Vienna in 1280, where he, alongside to Henry IV Probus, paid homage to King Rudolph I of Germany. This meeting would be an opportunity to Władysław to conclude a new alliance, this time with Henry IV Probus, Duke of Wrocław. The agreement was sealed with the marriage of Henry IV to Władysław's daughter, perhaps named Constance. Władysław also promised to support his new son-in-law in his efforts to obtain the royal crown, but under the condition that his daughter would be crowned as queen.

In internal politics, Władysław sought to continue the work of his predecessors, while increasing the importance of the Church in his lands. He was a founder of many monasteries, like the Dominicans in Racibórz, the Cistercians in Rudy, the Franciscans in Wodzisław and Głogówek and the Benedictine in Orlová). Another important sign of his reign was the institution of Magdeburg Law in almost all the cities of his duchy (such as Bytom, Gliwice, Lubliniec, Oświęcim, Wodzisław, and Żory).

Władysław died between 27 August and 13 September 1282 (1281 according to some sources) and was buried in the Dominican monastery of Racibórz.

== Marriage and issue ==
In 1251 Władysław married Euphemia (c. 1230 – 15 February aft. 1281), daughter of Władysław Odonic, Duke of Greater Poland. They had five children:

1. Mieszko I (1252/56 – by 27 June 1315).
2. Casimir (1253/57 – 10 March 1312).
3. Bolko I (bef. 21 October 1258 – 14 May 1313).
4. A daughter (Constance?) (1256/65? – 1287/88?); married by 1280 to Henry IV Probus, Duke of Wrocław; they were divorced in 1287.
5. Przemysław (c. 12 June 1268 – 7 May 1306).

== Notes ==
Vladislaus I of Opole House of Piast Born: c. 1225 Died: 14 May 1281
Preceded by Henry I the Bearded	Duke of Kalisz with Miesko II (until 1239); 1234–1244	Succeeded by Przemysł I
Preceded by Henry I the Bearded	Duke of Wieluń with Miesko II (until 1239); 1234–1249	Succeeded by Przemysł I
Preceded by Mieszko II the Fat	Duke of Opole-Racibórz; 1246–1282	Succeeded by Casimir and Bolko I (in Opole); Mieszko I and Przemysław (in Racibórz)
