= Eudoxia of Kiev =

Duchess consort of Poland
- Tenure: 1173–1177
- Born: c. 1131
- Died: c. 1187
- Spouse: Mieszko III the Old
- Issue: Władysław III Spindleshanks; Bolesław of Kuyavia; Mieszko the Younger; Salome, Princess of Pomerania; Anastasia, Duchess of Pomerania
- House: Piast
- Father: Iziaslav II of Kiev
- Mother: Agnes of Germany

Eudoxia Iziaslavna of Kiev (Ukrainian: Євдокія Ізяславна, Russian: Евдокия Изяславна, Polish: Eudoksja Izjasławówna; c. 1131 – c. 1187), was a Kievan Rus' princess member of the Izyaslavichi of Volhynia and by marriage Duchess of Greater Poland and since 1173 High Duchess of Poland.

According to some historians she was the daughter of Iziaslav II, Grand Prince of Kiev by his first wife Agnes (perhaps renamed Lyubava), daughter of King Conrad III of Germany.

== Life ==
In 1154, Eudoxia married Mieszko III the Old, Duke of Greater Poland, who had recently lost his first wife, Princess Elisabeth of Hungary. With this union, Mieszko III probably wanted to cement his relations with the Izyaslavichi of Volhynia.

During her marriage, Eudoxia bore her husband five children, three sons —Bolesław, Mieszko the Younger and Władysław III Spindleshanks— and two daughters —Salomea (Princess of Pomerania) and Anastasia (Duchess of Pomerania)—.

In 1173, Mieszko III succeeded his older brother Bolesław IV the Curly as High Duke of Poland and Eudoxia served as his High Duchess consort. However, their reign was short-lived: in 1177 Mieszko III's eldest son Odon rebelled against him, with the help of his uncle Casimir II the Just. The main reason of Odon's rebellion was the favoritism showed by Mieszko III to his children with Eudoxia, and the attempts of the High Duke to force him to become a priest, in order to eliminated from the succession.

Mieszko III was forced to escape and went to Bohemia (where he asked the help of his son-in-law Duke Sobeslav II unsuccessfully), Germany and Pomerania (there, Mieszko III obtain the support of his other son-in-law Duke Bogislaw I).

About Eudoxia's fate nothing is known. She certainly joined her husband in his exile and was alive when Mieszko III recover his Greater Poland domains in 1182, but was dead when he recovered the title of High Duke in 1191. Some sources placed her death around 1187, but others believed that she was alive in 1209.

Eudoxia of Kiev Izyaslavichi of Volhynia Born: c. 1131 Died: c. 1187
Royal titles
Preceded by Maria	High Duchess consort of Poland; 1173–1177	Succeeded by Helen of Znojmo
