= Agnes of Landsberg =

German noblewoman

- Born: 1192 or 1193
- Died: 1266; Wienhausen
- Buried: Wienhausen Abbey
- Noble family: Wettin
- Spouse: Henry V, Count Palatine of the Rhine
- Father: Conrad II, Margrave of Lusatia
- Mother: Elisabeth of Poland

Agnes of Landsberg (1192 or 1193 – 1266 in Wienhausen) was a German noblewoman. She was the third child of Conrad II (1159–1210), Margrave of Lusatia, and his wife, Elisabeth (c. 1153 – 1209), the daughter of Mieszko III the Old (1126–1202), Duke of Poland. She was a daughter-in-law of Henry the Lion.

== Life ==
Agnes was the youngest daughter of the ruling family of Landsberg. Her elder brother was Conrad (died before 1210); her sister was Matilda (c. 1190 – 1225), who married Margrave Albert II of Brandenburg. Agnes married in 1211 to Henry V, Count Palatine of the Rhine (1173 – 28 April 1277 in Brunswick), the eldest son of Henry the Lion.

Ersch and Gruber had this to say about Agnes and her husband:

Henry took possession of Otto's territories after the latter died without heir at the Harzburg in 1218, after a turbulent reign. He handed the Imperial Regalia to Frederick II and retired to Brunswick, where he spent the rest of his life in peace. In 1223, he declared that Otto the Child, the only son of his brother William would be the sole heir of the Welf allodial possessions in Saxony. He died in 1227. He had two daughters and a son by his wife Agnes. He had already transferred the Palatinate to his son, Henry II. However, Henry II died in 1214. It appears that after 1214, Frederick II handed the Palatinate to Duke Louis I, as there are no deeds dated after 1214 in which Henry call himself Count Palatine or takes any action regarding the Palatinate. Henry married his daughter Agnes to Duke Otto the Illustrious of Bavaria and her sister Irmengard to Herman of Baden. There is a theory that the Getrude of Brunswick who married Duke Frederick of Austria may have been a daughter of our Henry. After the death of his beloved Agnes of the Palatinate, Henry remarried to Agnes of Landsberg. From this second marriage, he had no children.

— Ersch and Gruber, Johann Samuel Ersch and Johann Gottfried Gruber: Allgemeine Encyclopädie der Wissenschaften und Künste in alphabetischer Folge, Leipzig, 1828, p. 348

Agnes died in 1266 and was buried in Wienhausen Abbey

== Founding monasteries ==
Between 1217 and 1221, a, probably wooden, Cistercian monastery was constructed on the lower reaches of the Burgdorfer Aue, near Nienhagen, and populated with nuns from the monastery in Wöltingerode. This was an initiative of Henry and his wife Agnes. The monastery no longer exists, but the place where it stood is still called Klosterhof (i.e. "monastery court"). The place was infested by "water musquitos and poisonous worms" and suffered from "unhealthy, swampy air". After about the years, the monastery was moved to Wienhausen. In 1233, the Bishop of Hildesheim confirmed the rights of Wienhausen Abbey.

in 1243, Agnes founded a monk's monastery in Isenhagen. It was later converted to the Cistercian Isenhagen Abbey.

== Domus Ottonis ==
Duke Otto the Child gave his aunt Agnes a house, named Domus Ottonis (i.e. "Otto's house") in the city of Cell, with all the farmland and forests that belonged to it, with permission to leave the house and the lands to Wienhausen Abbey in her will. This house was probably built as a hunting lodge for Otto when his aunt stille lived at Altencelle castle. After Agnes's death, the house came into the possession of Wienhausen Abbey, who would rent it out.
