= Anastasia of Greater Poland =

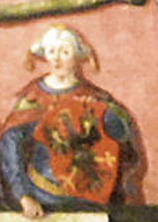
Anastasia of Greater Poland, Duchess Regent of Pomerania

Anastasia of Greater Poland (Polish: Anastazja Mieszkówna; b. ca. 1164 – d. aft. 31 May 1240), was Duchess of Pomerania by marriage to Bogislaw I, Duke of Pomerania, and regent from 1187 until 1208 during the minority of her sons Bogislaw II and Casimir II.

== Life ==
She was the youngest child of Mieszko III the Old, Duke of Greater Poland and since 1173 High Duke of Poland, by his second wife Eudoxia, daughter of Grand Prince Iziaslav II of Kiev.

=== Duchess ===
On 26 April 1177 Anastasia married Bogislaw I, Duke of Pomerania. This marriage reinforced the alliance between Mieszko III and his western neighbors, who started soon before with the marriage of Anastasia's older sister Salomea with Ratibor, the eldest of Bogislaw I's two sons born from his first marriage with Walburgis (who died before 18 April 1172). During her marriage, Anastasia bore her husband two other sons, Bogislaw in 1178 and Casimir around 1180.

The High Duke gained a faithful ally with this son-in-law, who was the only who supported him when he was exiled from Poland due to the rebellion of his eldest son (and Anastasia's half-brother) Odon. In 1181 Anastasia's father was able to reconquer Gniezno and Kalisz with the help of Duke Bogislaw I. They even took Poznań from Odon, who finally reconciled with his father one year later.

=== Regency ===
The deaths of Princes Ratibor (14–15 January 1183) and Wartislaw (18 February 1184), left Anastasia's sons as the only heirs of Duke Bogislaw I. On 18 March 1187 the Duke died while hunting near Sassnitz; at that time, his two surviving sons Bogislaw II and Casimir II were minors. For this, they succeeded in the Duchy as co-rulers under the regency of their mother, who was assisted in the government firstly by Wartislaw, castellan of Stettin (during 1187–1189) and later by Jaromar I, Prince of Rügen (during 1189–1198). However, the real authority over the Duchy of Pomerania was held by Anastasia until 1208, when her sons were declared adults and began their personal government.

=== Later life ===
Anastasia survived both her sons: Casimir II was dead by the end of 1219 and Bogislaw II died on 24 January 1220. Four years later, on 7 July 1224, she issued a document under which she approved the foundation of a Norbertine monastery in Trzebiatów, which was richly endowed by the Dowager Duchess, giving to them a part of her widow's seat (received after his marriage): twenty castles and seven villages. After the construction of the monastery was finished, Anastasia moved there, but she never took the religious vows.

The last time Anastasia appeared in public was on 31 May 1240, when her grandson Wartislaw III confirmed the foundation of the monastery. She died soon after that date and was buried in the Norbertine monastery in Trzebiatów.
