= Bolesław of Kuyavia =

12th-century Polish nobleman

Bolesław
- Duke of Kuyavia
- Coat-of-arms of Piast of Poland
- Born: c. 1159
- Died: 13 September 1195
- Noble family: Piast dynasty
- Spouse: Dobroslawa of Pomerania
- Issue: Eudoxia (Audacia); Wierzchosława; Daughter (Dobroslawa?)
- Father: Mieszko III the Old
- Mother: Eudoxia of Kiev

Bolesław of Kuyavia (also known as Mieszkowic) (Polish: Bolesław kujawski (Mieszkowic)) (c. 1159 – 13 September 1195) was a Duke of Kuyavia from 1186 until his death.

He was the eldest child (but third-born son) of Mieszko III the Old, Duke of Greater Poland and High Duke of Poland in 1173, by his second wife Eudoxia, daughter of Grand Prince Iziaslav II of Kiev.

== Life ==
Almost immediately after his birth, Bolesław was considered the main successor to his father in the Greater Poland inheritance, especially since Mieszko III had become the High Duke and overlord of Poland in 1173 after the death of his brother Bolesław IV the Curly.

In 1177, the authoritarian government of Mieszko III began The Rebellion of The Kraków Nobility and called upon his brother, Casimir II the Just to take the title of High Duke. At the same time was joined to the conspiracy Mieszko III's eldest son Odon (from his first marriage), who resented his father's favoritism for the children born to his second marriage with Eudoxia. The revolt which broke out in Greater Poland between 1177-1179 was a complete surprise to Mieszko III, who was forced to escape from Poland with Bolesław and his younger brothers Mieszko and Władysław. The deposed High Duke took refuge in Bohemia, Germany and then in the court of his son-in-law Bogislaw I, Duke of Pomerania.

Mieszko III regained control over Greater Poland in 1181, thanks to the help of Pomeranian troops. Once he recovered his domains, Mieszko III didn't divide his domains between his sons (as was expected) and already trying to pull his own political plans who were centered in the recovery of Kraków and with this, the Seniorate Province.

In 1186, Leszek, Duke of Masovia died without issue. In his will, he left all the Masovian-Kuyavian principality to his youngest uncle Casimir II the Just. However, Mieszko III could master Kuyavia; soon after, he passed his new acquisition to Bolesław (some historians believed that Bolesław only obtained Kuyavia in 1194 after the death of Casimir II the Just).

Another important year in Bolesław could be 1191, when his father, using the absence of Casimir II the Just (who was involved in the Kievan Rus' succession disputes), seized and conquer Kraków. Then for unknown reasons, Mieszko III didn't personally take the government of the capital, but gave them to Bolesław (although some sources believed that the prince who was appointed Governor of Kraków was Mieszko the Younger). Bolesław's rule as governor in Kraków wasn't too long, because soon Casimir II the Just would recover his authority over the capital and imprison his nephew. However, the victorious Casimir II acted generously and sent the prince with his father.

On 5 May 1194, Casimir II the Just died unexpectedly, leaving two minor sons: Leszek and Konrad. Mieszko III saw his brother's death as a new opportunity to regain the supreme power, however, this time the local nobility stood at the side of Casimir II's sons.

Mieszko III's Greater Poland and Kuyavian troops and the Lesser Poland's troops (who fight on behalf of Leszek and Konrad), led by the voivode Mikołaj Gryfita, faced in the bloody Battle of Mozgawa (13 September 1195); Bolesław was among the casualties. Mieszko III, seriously injured, withdraw to Kalisz without waiting for the Silesia troops who came to his aid, led by Mieszko I Tanglefoot and Jarosław of Opole.

== Marriage and issue ==
Around 1187/89, Bolesław married with Dobroslawa (b. 1162/72 - d. 23 November 1206/after 1230?), a Pomeranian princess. They all certainly had only female offspring, but the exact number remains disputed. Various sources show some of the following three daughters, but no source shows all three of them:

1. Eudoxia (Audacia) (b. ca. 1190/95 – d. 1270), married in 1208 to Henry I, Count of Schwerin.
2. Wierzchosława (b. bef. 1195 – d. 2 January/11 September? ca. 1212), a nun in Strzelno.
3. Daughter (Dobroslawa?) (b. posthumously? bef. 1196 – d. aft. 1249/53), married in 1210/15 to Jaczo I, Lord of Gützkow.

After his death without male issue, Kuyavia returned to his father Mieszko III, but in 1198 he ceded the Duchy to Casimir II's sons in exchange of his recognition as High Duke.

== Notes ==
Bolesław of Kuyavia Piast Dynasty Born: 1159 Died: 13 September 1195
Preceded by Leszek	Duke of Kuyavia; 1186–1195	Succeeded by Mieszko III the Old
