= Jan Zachariasiewicz =

Polish novelist and journalist

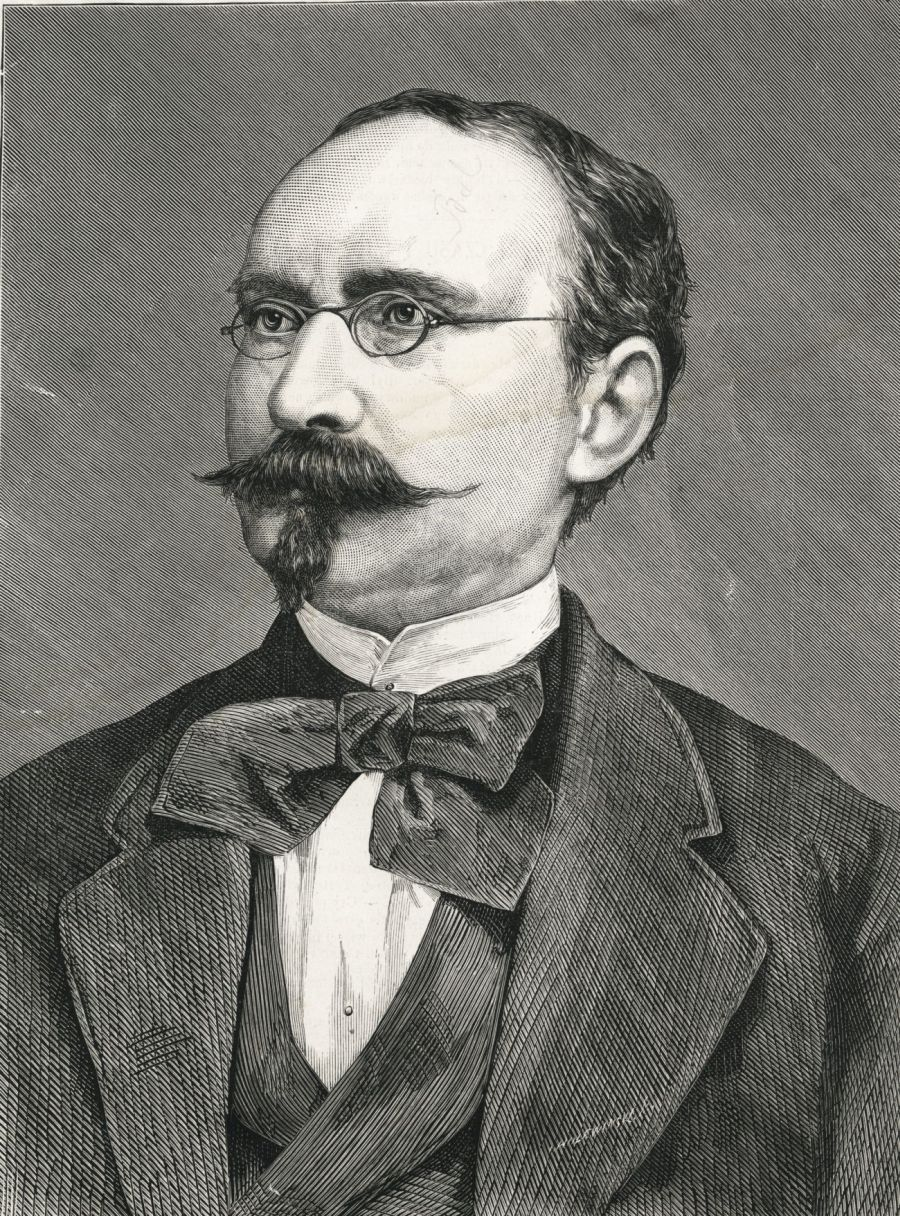
- An engraving of Zachariasiewicz by Józef Holewiński from the weekly newspaper Kłosy, 1875
- Born: Jan Chryzostom Zachariasiewicz; September 1, 1823; Radymno, Kingdom of Galicia and Lodomeria, Austrian Empire
- Died: May 6, 1906 (aged 82); Krzywcza, Austrian Empire
- Education: Universität Lemberg
- Relatives: Franciszek Zachariasiewicz
- Writing career
- Pen name: Maciej Łomża
- Period: 19th century
- Notable awards: Order of Franz Joseph
- Movement: Polish Positivism
- Known for: Coining the term Western Borderlands
- Criminal charges: Printing seditious material
- Criminal penalty: Imprisoned in Spielberg Castle 1842–44 and Theresienstadt fortress 1850–52
- Parents: Aleksander Zachariasiewicz (father); Antonina Martyna née Gwiazdowska (mother)

Jan Chryzostom Zachariasiewicz (Polish pronunciation: [ˈjan xrɨˈzɔstɔm zaxarjaˈɕɛvit͡ʂ]; 1823–1906; Zacharyasiewicz, Zacharjasiewicz) was a Polish novelist and journalist.

== Biography ==
Zachariasiewicz was born on 11 September 1823 in Radymno. During 1842–44 he was a prisoner of Spielberg Castle. Co-editor of Tygodnik Polski, where he published poem Machabeusze. For publishing this work and also for participation in Revolutions of 1848, Zachariasiewicz was later imprisoned in Theresienstadt fortress for two years.

He was a nephew or grandnephew of the bishop Franciszek Zachariasiewicz (1770–1845).

Zachariasiewicz died on 7 May 1906 in Krzywcza.

== Works ==
In Lviv Zachariasiewicz published and edited magazines including:

- Postęp (1848), a radical political magazine, with K. Widman
- Tygodnik Polski (1849)
- Nowiny (1854–1856)
- Kółko Rodzinne (1860)

His notable novels include:

- Skromne nadzieje (1854)
- Na kresach (1860)
- Święty Jur (1862), vol. 1–3
- Człowiek bez jutra (1871)
- Zły interes (1876)
- Wybór pism (1886–1888), a collection of works, vol. 1–11
