= Conrad II of Lusatia =

Conrad II, Margrave of Lusatia
- Born: before 1159
- Died: 6 May 1210
- Buried: Wechselburg Priory
- Noble family: Wettin
- Spouse: Elisabeth of Poland
- Issue: Conrad; Matilda, Margravine of Brandenburg; Agnes, Countess Palatine of the Rhine
- Father: Dedi III, Margrave of Lusatia
- Mother: Matilda of Heinsberg

Margrave Conrad II of Lusatia, also known as Margrave Konrad II of Landsberg (before 1159 – 6 May 1210), was a member of the House of Wettin. He was Count of Eilenburg and Margrave of Lusatia from 1190 until his death. From 1207, he was also Count of Groitz and Count of Sommerschenburg. He was a son of Margrave Dedi III and his wife, Matilda of Heinsberg, the heiress of Sommerschenburg.

== Life ==
Conrad inherited the March of Lusatia and the County of Eilenburg when his father died in 1190. In 1207, he inherited the Counties of Groitz and Sommerschenburg from his brother Dietrich.

In 1195, Emperor Henry VI dissolved the March of Meissen after the death of Margrave Albert I. This made Conrad the highest-ranking nobleman in the area, and the most senior member of the House of Wettin.

In 1196, Conrad travelled via Italy to the Holy Land to participate in the Crusade of Emperor Henry VI. In 1198, he returned home, again via Italy. In 1207, he organized a Landtag at Delitzsch Castle.

Conrad died on 6 May 1210 and was buried in the Wechselburg Priory. His wife Elisabeth was buried in Dobrilugk Abbey. Since he had no male heirs, his territory passed to his cousin Theodoric I, who had been appointed Margrave of Meissen when the March of Meissen was reinstated by Emperor Otto IV in 1198. After 1210, there no longer was a separate Margrave of Lusatia. Instead, Lusatia was held by the Margraves of Meissen, then the Margraves of Landsberg, then divided between Bohemia and Brandenburg.

== Marriage and issue ==
Conrad married Elisabeth (Elżbieta) of Poland, who was a daughter of Mieszko III the Old, the High Duke of Poland, and widow of Soběslav II, Duke of Bohemia. He had three children with her: (Note: The yearbook of Lower Saxon History, vol. 43-44, Hildesheim, 1971, p. 167, disagrees. It mentions only Matilda and Agnes.)

- Conrad (documented as alive in 1207; died before 6 May 1210)
- Matilda (died in 1255 in Salzwedel, buried in Lehnin Abbey), married in August 1205 Albert II, Margrave of Brandenburg
- Agnes (d. 1266), founder of Wienhausen Abbey and buried there; married in 1211 to Henry V, Count Palatine of the Rhine

== Sources ==
- Davies, Norman (1982). God's Playground: A History of Poland. Vol. I: The Origins to 1795. Columbia University Press.
- Lyon, Jonathan R. (2013). Princely Brothers and Sisters: The Sibling Bond in German Politics, 1100-1250. Cornell University Press.
- Heinrich Theodor Flathe (1882). "Konrad von Landsberg" . Allgemeine Deutsche Biographie (in German). Vol. 16. Leipzig: Duncker & Humblot. pp. 587–588.
- Holger Kunde: Das Zisterzienserkloster Pforte — Die Urkundenfälschungen und die frühe Geschichte bis 1236, in the series Quellen und Forschungen zur Geschichte Sachsen-Anhalts, vol. 4, Böhlau, Cologne, 2003, ISBN 3-412-14601-3, p. 99
- Ferdinand Wachter: Geschichte Sachsens bis auf die neuesten Zeiten, part 2, August Lehnhold, Leipzig, 1830, p. 225

Conrad II of Lusatia House of Wettin Born: before 1159 Died: 6 May 1210
Preceded by Dedi III	Margrave of Lusatia; 1190-1210	Succeeded by Theodoric I
