= Lucia of Rügen =

High Duchess consort of Poland
- Tenure: 1202–1206; 1227–1229
- Died: 12 February 1208/1231
- Spouse: Władysław III Spindleshanks
- House: House of Piast (by marriage)
- Father: Jaromar I, Prince of Rügen
- Mother: Hildegard of Denmark

Lucia of Rügen (died 12 February between 1208 and 1231), was the daughter of Jaromar I, Prince of Rügen and his wife Hildegard, daughter of Canute V of Denmark and Helena of Sweden.

In 1186, Lucia married Władysław III Spindleshanks, youngest son of Mieszko III the Old, Duke of Greater Poland and since 1173 High Duke of Poland. This union was beneficial in Mieszko III's interests in Western Pomerania and Denmark.

The marriage was childless. Lucia's character or appearance are unknown. Certainly, her husband wasn't faithful to her and had numerous mistresses.

The only known fact of Lucia's life during her time in Poland was when she was involved in the baptism of the youngest child of Henry I the Bearded and Hedwig of Andechs in Głogów on 25 December 1208. Lucia stayed at the ceremony with her husband, perhaps brought the baby some presents.

Lucia's date of death is disputed among historians. The Obituary of the Monastery of Lubin gives Lucia's date of death as 12 February, but not the year. It is also unknown where she was buried.

== Bibliography ==
- Satała Z., Poczet polskich królowych, księżnych i metres [Polish queens, princesses and meters], Warsaw 1990.
- Urbanski, M., Towards queens and wives of Polish kings, Warsaw 2006.

Lucia of Rügen House of Piast Died: 1208-1231
Royal titles
Preceded by Helen of Znojmo	High Duchess consort of Poland; 1202–1206	Succeeded by Grzymislawa of Luck
Preceded by Grzymislawa of Luck	High Duchess consort of Poland (second time); 1227–1229?	Succeeded by Agafia of Rus
