= Elisabeth of Greater Poland, Duchess of Bohemia =

Duchess of Bohemia from 1173 to 1178

Coat-of-arms of the House of Piast.

Elisabeth of Greater Poland (Polish: Elżbieta Mieszkówna; Czech: Eliška Polská) (c. 1152 – 2 April 1209) was a Polish princess of the House of Piast and, by her two marriages, Duchess of Bohemia and Margravine of Lusatia.

She was a daughter of Mieszko III the Old, Duke of Greater Poland and from 1173 High Duke of Poland, by his first wife, Elisabeth, daughter of King Béla II of Hungary.

Elisabeth's birthdate is unknown. Medieval sources do not even indicate whether the Hungarian princess was her mother. Elizabeth is believed to have been her daughter only because both had the same name. Some scholars report that Elizabeth was born about 1152 or 1154.

== Life ==
=== Duchess of Bohemia ===
Around 1173 Elisabeth was married to Soběslav II, Duke of Bohemia. This union was part of the multiple dynastic arrangements made by Duke Mieszko III. As a result of this agreement, in 1176 Polish troops helped Duke Soběslav II in his fight against the House of Babenberg, the rulers of Austria. In 1178 Prince Frederick (Soběslav II's cousin) besieged Prague; Elisabeth, who at that time was there, was then captured by Frederick, but soon she was set free. On 27 January 1179 Soběslav II was completely defeated in battle on the outskirts of Prague and he took refuge in Skála castle. After a long siege, at the end of 1179, Frederick won the war and became a new ruler of Bohemia. Elisabeth and her husband went into exile in Hungary, where Soběslav II died on 29 January 1180. They had no children.

=== Margravine of Lusatia ===
Elisabeth never returned to Poland. Soon after her husband died (end January or early February 1180), she married Conrad, the fifth son of Dedi V, Margrave of Lusatia. They had three children: one son, Conrad, and two daughters, Matilda and Agnes.

On 16 August 1190, Margrave Dedi V died, and his domains were divided between his two surviving sons: the eldest, Dietrich, inherited the counties of Sommerschenburg and Groitzsch (as the eldest heir of his mother) and the second son, Conrad, received the Margravate of Lusatia (the main paternal domain) and the county of Eilenburg. In consequence, Elisabeth became Margravine consort of Lusatia and Countess consort of Eilenburg. There are no records about her role at the Lusatian court.

=== Death and aftermath ===
At the beginning of 1209, Conrad II defeated the army of Elisabeth's half-brother, Władysław III Spindleshanks, in the Battle of Lubusz. It is assumed that this experience may have contributed to the death of Elisabeth in April 1209. A year later, on 6 May 1210, Conrad II died.

Elisabeth is buried at Dobrilugk Abbey. Her only son, Conrad, died in boyhood; Agnes, the youngest daughter, married Henry V, Count Palatine of the Rhine, but they had no children. Elisabeth's many descendants issued from her eldest daughter Matilda and her husband Albert II, Margrave of Brandenburg.

Royal titles
Preceded by Elisabeth of Hungary	Duchess consort of Bohemia ca. 1173–1178	Succeeded by Elisabeth of Hungary
