= Mieszko the Younger =

Duke of Kalisz

- Duke of Kalisz
- Coat-of-arms of Piast of Poland
- Born: between 1160 and 1165
- Died: 2 August 1193
- Noble family: Piast dynasty
- Father: Mieszko III the Old
- Mother: Eudoxia of Kiev

Mieszko the Younger (also known as of Kalisz) (Polish: Mieszko Młodszy (kaliski)) (between 1160 and 1165 – 2 August 1193) was a Duke of Kalisz from 1191 until his death.

He was the second child (but fourth-born son) of Mieszko III the Old, Duke of Greater Poland and from 1173 High Duke of Poland, due to his marriage to his second wife Eudoxia, daughter of Grand Prince Iziaslav II of Kiev.

== Life ==
We do not know when he was born. His older brother, Bolesław, was born in 1159, while his younger brother Władysław Laskonogi was alive in 1166 or 1167.

Mieszko is documented earliest in 1166 or 1167, in a document signed between Mieszko III and Casimir II the Just at the congress in Jędrzejów, as one of the sons of the Duke of Greater Poland.

Between 1177 and 1179, as a result of the revolt against his father, Mieszko, with his parents and siblings, was exiled from Poland. They probably returned to the country in 1181, when Mieszko III regained the rule over Greater Poland.

In 1184 and thanks to the wise diplomatic affairs of his father, Mieszko the Younger was appointed by the sickly Duke Leszek Governor of the Masovian-Kuyavian principality, and with this, apparently the right of succession after his death. However, the arbitrary and cruel government of Mieszko III, caused Leszek to reassume his alliance with Casimir II the Just, who was appointed his sole heir. In 1185 Mieszko was then deposed and returned to his father's court.

In 1191 Mieszko III could conquer the capital Kraków, but, for unknown reasons he decided that one of his sons (either Mieszko or Bolesław of Kuyavia) exercise the power on his behalf as Governor. However, Casimir II soon regained the control of the district, and the Prince-Governor was exiled. At this point, Mieszko III decided to give the district of Kalisz to his youngest son and namesake, as his own duchy.

Mieszko the Younger died on 2 August 1193. He was buried in the crypt founded by his father in the Cathedral of St. Paul the Apostle in Kalisz. Tombstones of Mieszko the Younger and Mieszko III were found during archaeological excavations in 1958–1960.

For unknown reasons, Mieszko never married or had children. On his death, Mieszko III bequeathed Kalisz to his eldest son Odon.

Mieszko the Younger Piast Dynasty Born: 1160/65 Died: 2 August 1193
Preceded by Mieszko III the Old	Duke of Kalisz; 1191–1193	Succeeded by Odon
