= Stephen of Greater Poland =

Stephen
- Prince of Poland
- Coat-of-arms
- Born: 1150
- Died: 18 October 1177 (aged 27)
- Noble family: Piast dynasty
- Father: Mieszko III the Old
- Mother: Elisabeth of Hungary

Stephen of Greater Poland (Polish: Stefan Mieszkowic; c. 1150 – 18 October 1166/77?), was a Polish prince member of the House of Piast.

He was the second son of Mieszko III the Old, Duke of Greater Poland and since 1173 High Duke of Poland, by his first wife Elisabeth, daughter of King Béla II of Hungary. His name was probably given by his mother.

== Life ==
Nothing is known about Stephen's early years. His existence is confirmed only by two facts: his participation in the congress of Jędrzejów when Mieszko III rebelled against his brother Bolesław IV the Curly and because his name is noted in documents issued to the local Cistercian monastery between 18 October 1166 and 1168.

Stephen's further fate is unknown. He certainly never married or had issue, and is for sure that he died before his father, because Mieszko III left almost all his inheritance to his only surviving son, Władysław III Spindleshanks when he died in 1202. The place of his burial is also unknown.
