= Western Borderlands =

Western parts of the Polish–Lithuanian Commonwealth

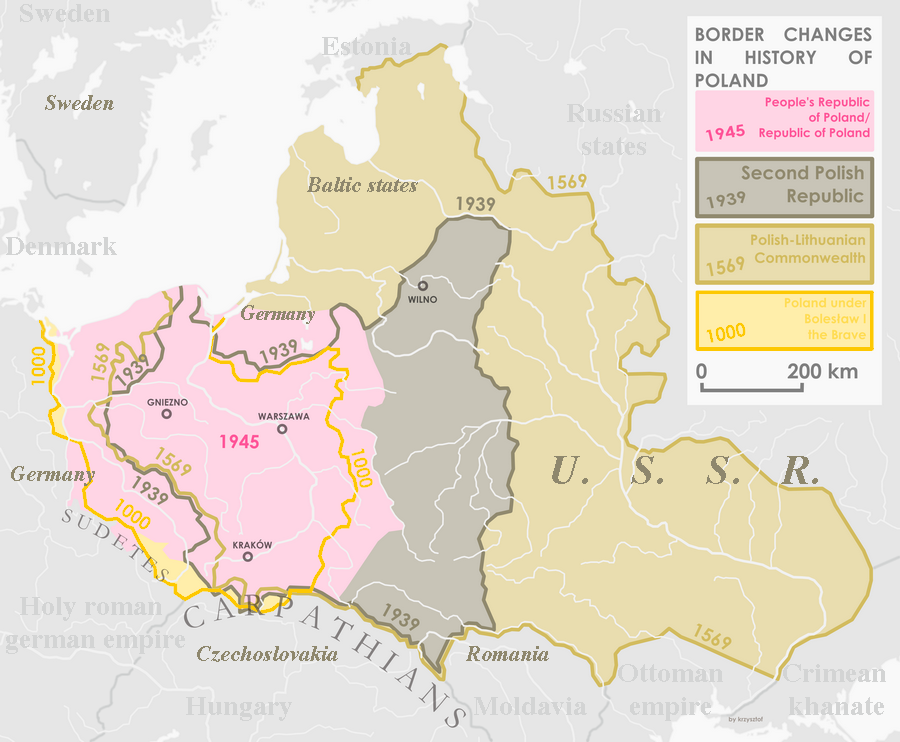
Border changes in history of Poland

Western Borderlands (Polish: Kresy Zachodnie, Polish pronunciation: [ˈkrɛsɨ zaˈxɔdɲɛ]) is a term used to refer to the western parts of the Polish–Lithuanian Commonwealth that in the partitions were annexed by Prussia. This name refers specifically to the regions of Eastern Pomerania, Greater Poland, Warmia, and occasionally Upper Silesia.

This term, styled after Eastern Borderlands (Polish: Kresy Wschodnie) was first used by Jan Chryzostom Zachariasiewicz in his novel Na kresach published in 1860, but it did not enter common usage.

The 19th century history of these regions was quite different from the rest of the former Commonwealth. There were uprisings in 1806, 1846, and 1848 but the main battle between the Polish majority and large German minority was for economic domination in these provinces.

After World War I, most of this area became part of the Second Polish Republic as a result of the Greater Poland and Silesian Uprisings and decisions by the victorious Allies.

During the interwar period interbellum most inhabitants of this area supported the politics of National Democracy political movement. Polish leader Józef Piłsudski was treated with considerable reserve or with open enmity. This was due to his collaboration with the Central Powers in World War I, and a perception that during the years when an independent Poland was being created Piłsudski was more interested in fighting for the Eastern Borderlands to become part of the new state than in fighting for the western Kresy Zachodnie. Following the end of World War II the region continued as part of Poland, as west-shifted Poland extended much into former German territory just to the Oder–Neisse line.

== See also ==
- Former eastern territories of Germany
- Greater Poland Uprising (1918–1919)
- Kulturkampf
- German Eastern Marches Society (Hakata)
- Settlement Commission
- Western Institute
- Recovered Territories
