= Grzymisława of Łuck =

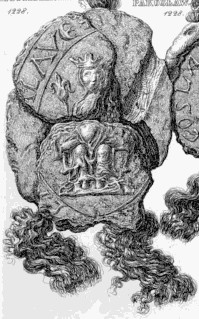

High Duchess consort of Poland
- Tenure: 1207–1210
- Tenure: 1211–1227
- Born: 1185–1195
- Died: c. 8 November 1258
- Spouse: Leszek the White
- Issue: Salomea of Poland; Helena, Princess of Bielsk; Bolesław V the Chaste
- House: Rurik
- Father: Ingvar of Kiev

Grzymisława Ingvarevna of Łuck (born probably between 1185 and 1195; died probably 8 November 1258) was a princess of Kraków. She was a daughter of Ingvar of Kiev, a grand prince of Kiev and prince of Lutsk (Polish: Łuck) from the Monomakhovichi branch of the Rurik dynasty.

== Life ==
In 1207, Grzymisława married Leszek the White, Prince of Kraków. This marriage was part of Leszek's avowed policy of eastward expansion. After the assassination of her husband (24 November 1227), she became regent on behalf of her minor son Bolesław V the Chaste, and briefly had to endure imprisonment by Konrad I of Masovia due to territorial disputes.

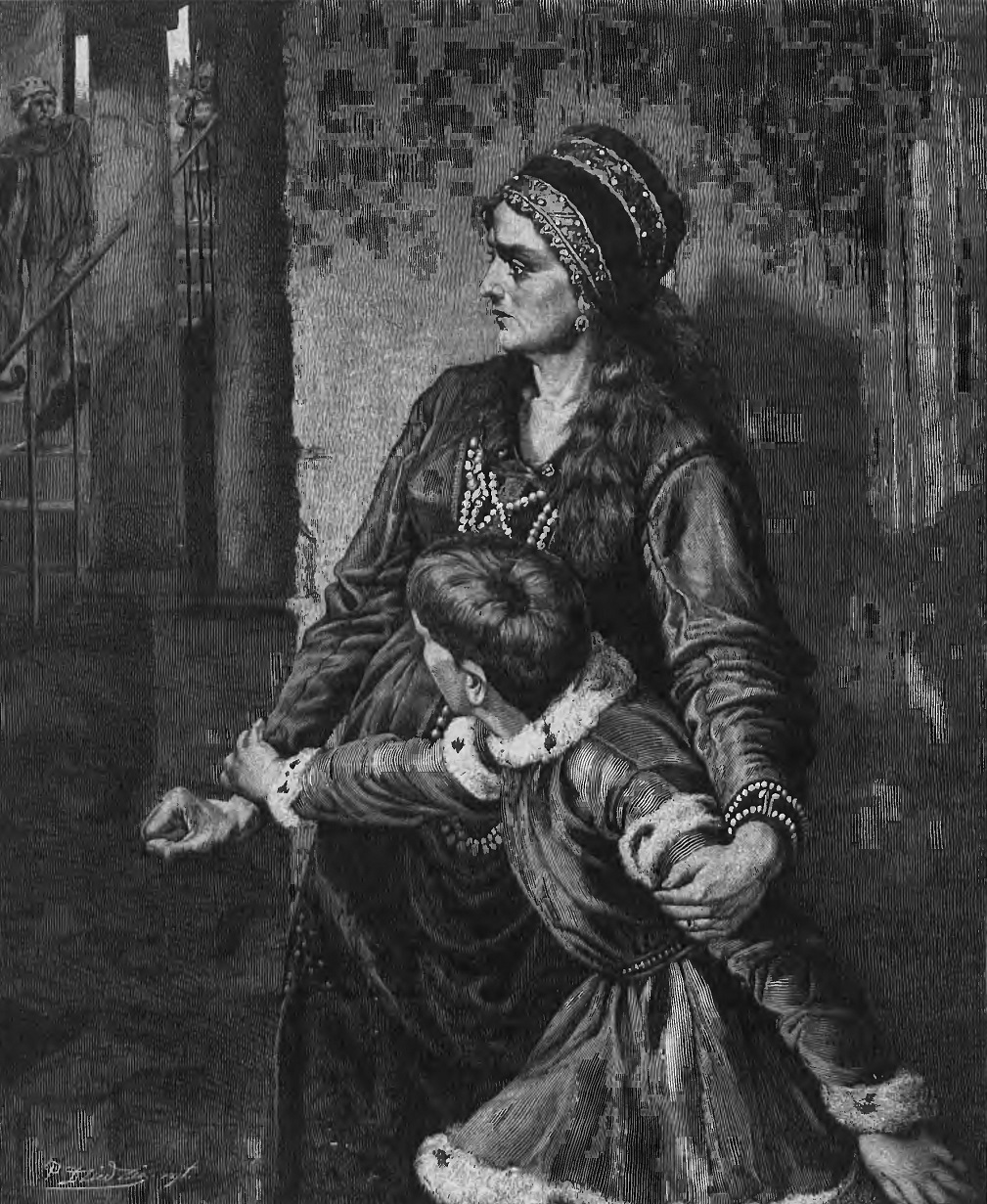
Grzymisława and her son in prison (by P. Dziedzic, based on the work of Damian Krajewski)

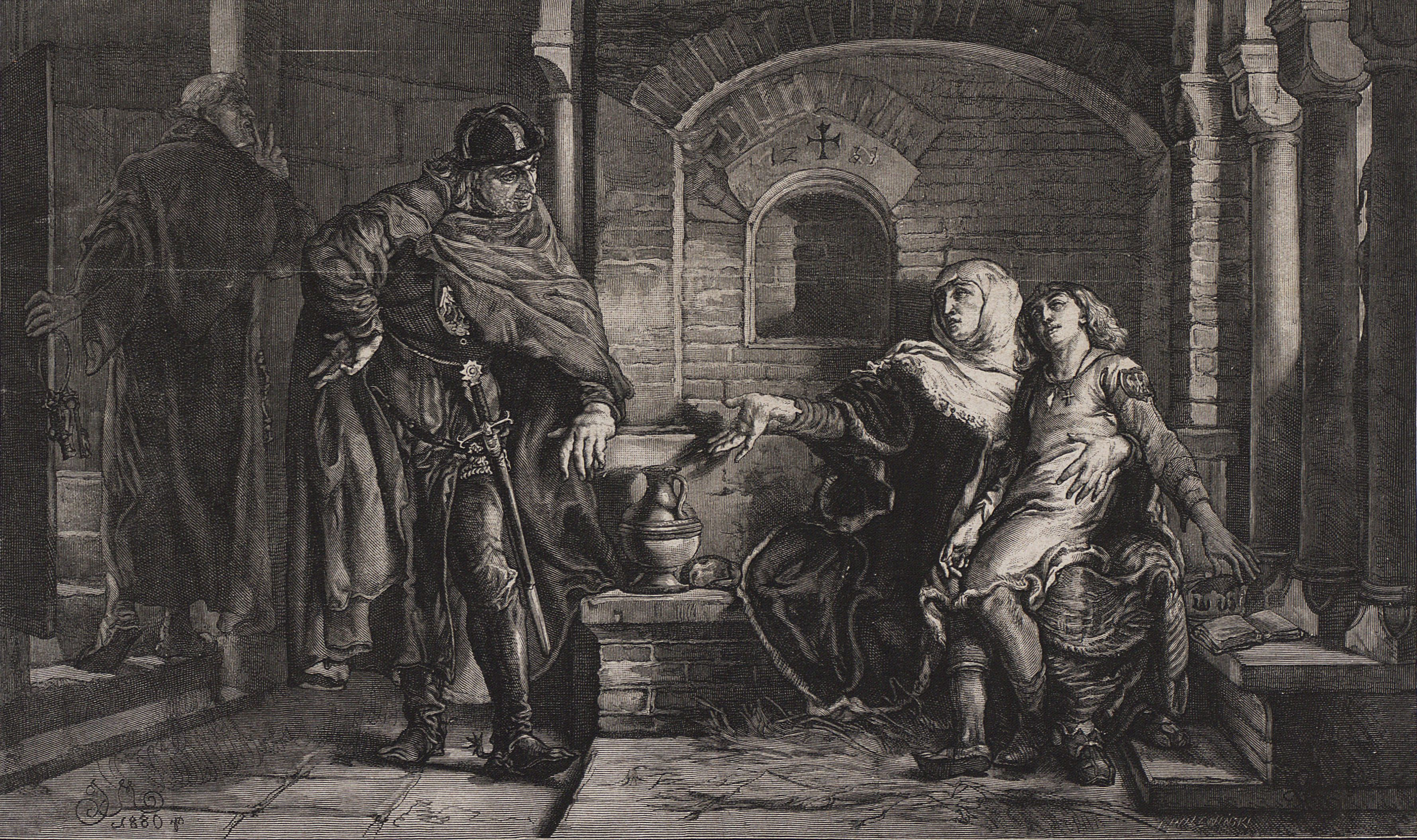
Grzymisława and her son in prison (woodcut by Józef Holewiński, based on the drawing of Jan Matejko)

After becoming independent, Bolesław still received considerable influence from his mother regarding his government. Grzymisława was closely linked with the Monastery of the Franciscans in Zawichost, where she became a benefactress. She died between 14 June and 24 December 1258, with a possible date of 8 November. She was probably buried in the Franciscan monastery in Zawichost.

There are also differing views on Grzymisława's origins, with some historians positing that Leszek the White married or became engaged in 1207 or 1208 to a daughter of Ingvar, whose name is unknown. Later, between 1208 and 1211, he married Grzymisława, perhaps the daughter of Yaroslav of Kiev.

Grzymisława and Leszek had three children:

1. Salomea (1211/1212 – 1268), married Coloman of Lodomeria; later beatified by Pope Clement X
2. Bolesław V the Chaste (21 June 1226 – 7 December 1279), succeeded his father

== Bibliography ==
- Jasiński, K., Rodowód Piastów małopolskich i kujawskich (en: Pedigree of Little Poland and Kuyavian Piasts), Poznań - Wrocław 2001.

Grzymisława of Łuck Rurik Born: 1185–1195 Died: 1258
Royal titles
Preceded by Lucia of Rügen	High Duchess consort of Poland; 1207–1210	Succeeded by Ludmila
Preceded by Ludmilla	High Duchess consort of Poland (second time); 1211–1227	Succeeded by Lucia of Rügen
