= Elizabeth of Hungary, Duchess of Greater Poland =

Duchess consort of Greater Poland from 1138 to 1154

Elizabeth of Hungary

Duchess consort of Greater Poland
- Tenure: 1138-1154
- Born: 1128
- Died: 21 July 1154 (aged 26)
- Spouse: Mieszko III the Old
- Issue: Odon of Poznań; Stephen; Elizabeth, Duchess of Bohemia; Wierzchoslawa Ludmilla, Duchess of Lorraine; Judith, Duchess of Saxony
- House: House of Arpad
- Father: Béla II of Hungary
- Mother: Helena of Raška

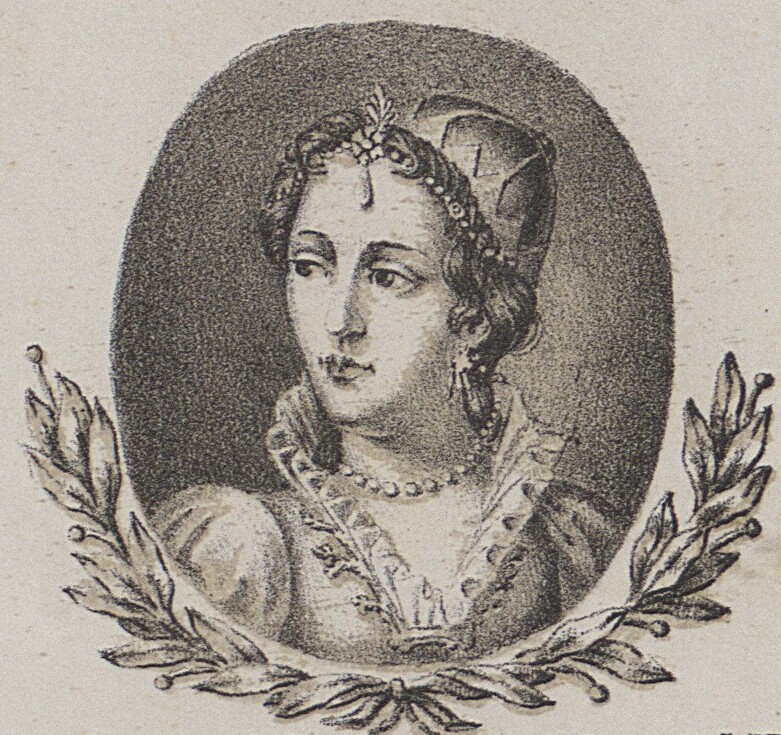

Elizabeth of Hungary (Hungarian: Erzsébet, Polish: Elżbieta; c. 1128 – 21 July 1154) was a member of the House of Árpád and by marriage Duchess of Greater Poland.

She was the eldest child of King Béla II of Hungary and Helena of Raška. This parentage is confirmed in several web sources who followed the message of chronicler Jan Długosz; however, modern historians led by Oswald Balzer refuted this theory on basis of chronological reasons: if Elizabeth's marriage date is correct, she must have been only between 8 and 9 years old, an age which seems extremely young for a bride, even by the standards of the Middle Ages. Balzer assumed that Elizabeth was a daughter of Prince Álmos, Duke of Croatia (father of King Béla II), a parentage which also is supported by further web sources. The disadvantage of this hypothesis are the message of medieval chronicles (for example, the Chronicon Polono-Silesiacum), who firmly established that Elizabeth was a daughter of the Hungarian King, a title Álmos never used because he was only a prince. Another theory was proposed by Kazimierz Jasiński: in his opinion, Elizabeth was a daughter of King Stephen II. Although sources indicated that because of his dissolute lifestyle, Stephen II didn't have any surviving children, according to Jasiński this messages are originated from a later period and don't deserve trust; also, it should be taken into account that frequently skipping for the chroniclers the birth of female offspring.

Around 1136, Elizabeth married with Prince Mieszko, son of the Polish ruler Bolesław III Wrymouth. The wedding was performed as a result of the agreement concluded a year earlier in Merseburg. Two years later (28 October 1138), Duke Bolesław III died; according to his will, Mieszko inherited the Greater Poland province and became in his first duke, with Elizabeth as his duchess.

Elizabeth and Mieszko had:

- Odon
- Stephen
- Elizabeth (Duchess of Bohemia and Margravine of Lusatia)
- Wierzchoslawa Ludmilla (Duchess of Lorraine)
- Judith (Countess of Anhalt and Duchess of Saxony)

Elizabeth died in 1154 aged twenty-six.

== Sources ==
- Davies, Norman (2005). God's Playground A History of Poland. Vol. 1: The Origins to 1795. Oxford University Press.
