= Józef Holewiński =

Polish artist (1848–1917)

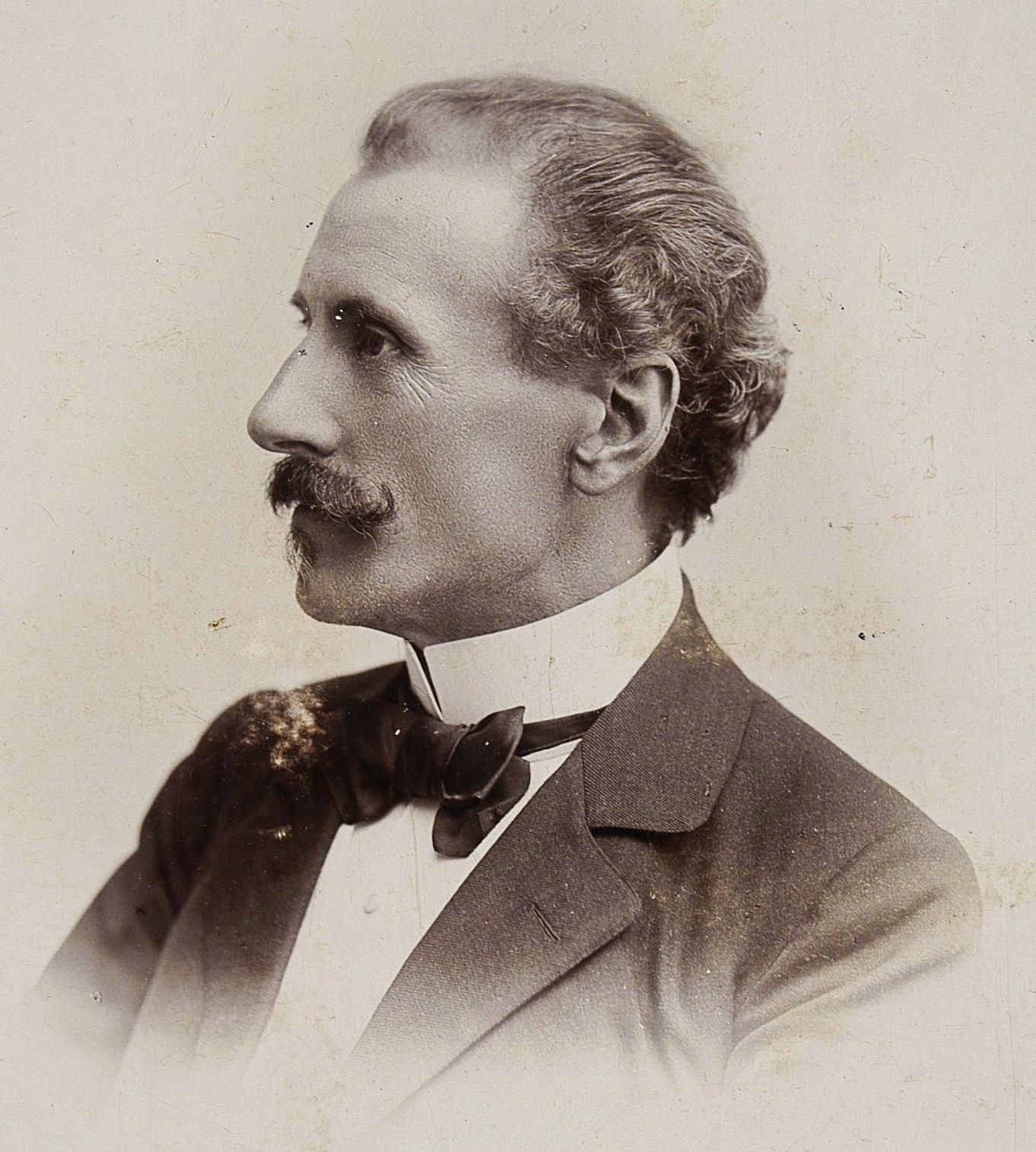
Józef Holewiński

Józef Holewiński (1848–1917) was a Polish graphic artist, engraver and painter.

== Career ==
Holewiński was a leading representative of Polish wood engraving. He did work for a number of periodicals, including Kłosy (Gleanings), Wędrowiec (The Wanderer) and Moderne Kunst (German: Modern Art). From 1891 he was artistic director at the Warsaw Tygodnik Ilustrowany (Illustrated Weekly).

He engraved paintings and drawings for periodicals after Jan Matejko, Juliusz Kossak and others. He executed reproductions for Album Jana Matejki (Album of Jan Matejko, 1876).

Toward the end of his life, Holewiński painted landscapes and portraits.

== Gallery ==
Works by Holewiński:

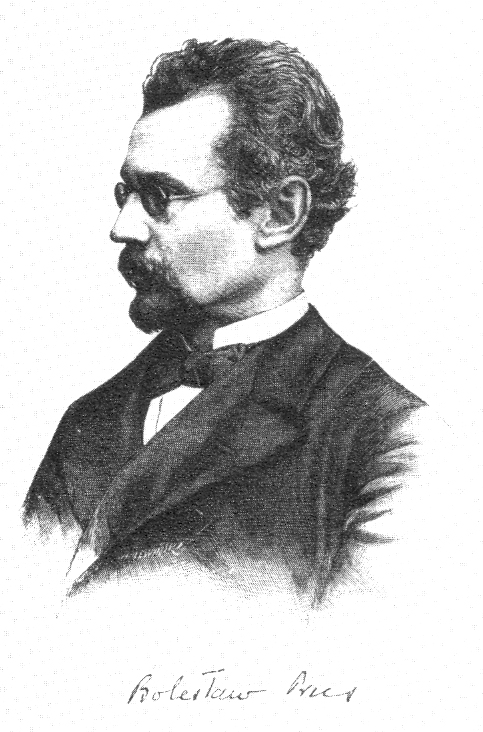
Bolesław Prus (frontispiece to first book edition of Prus' novel, The Doll, 1890)

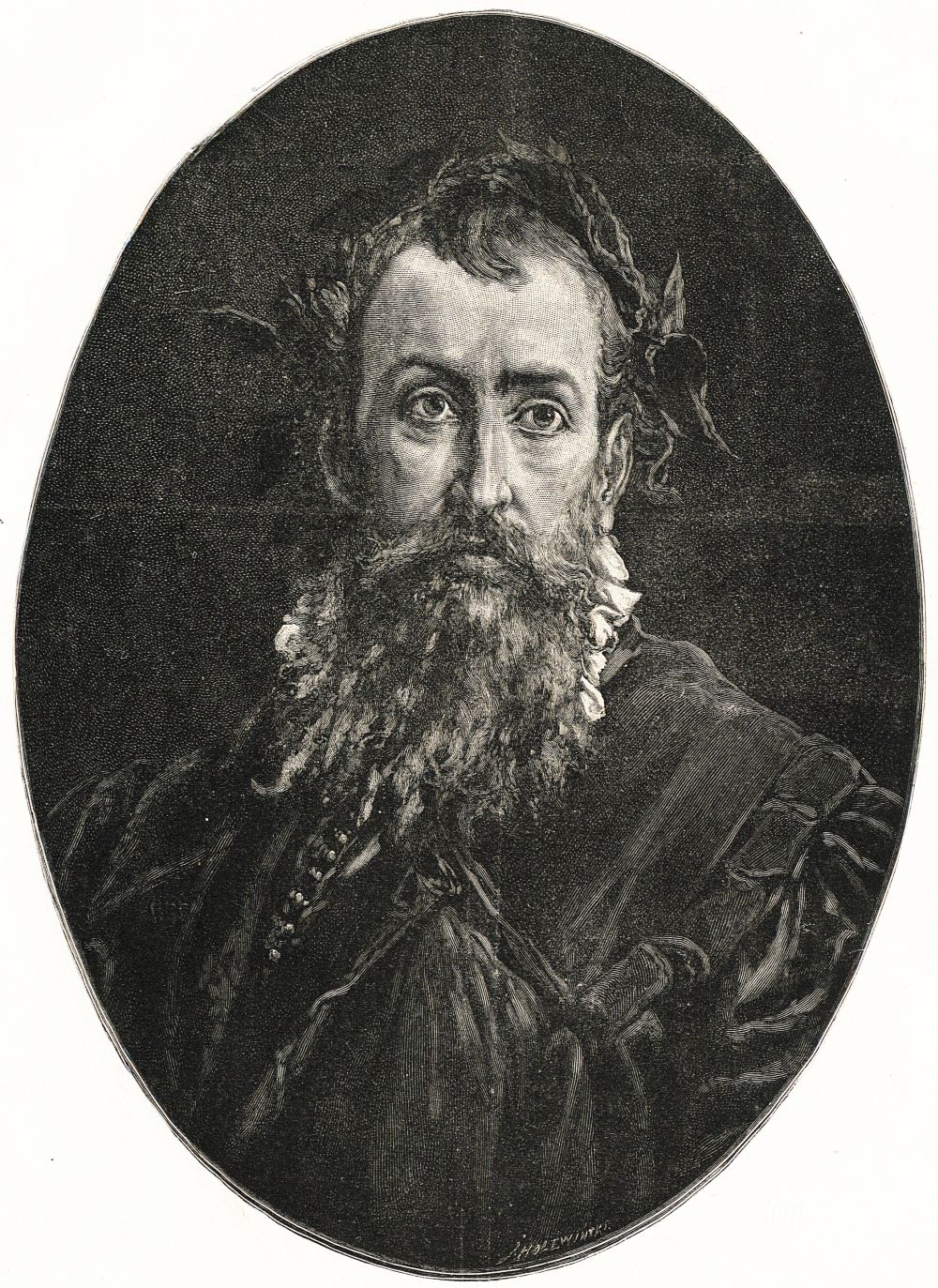
Jan Kochanowski

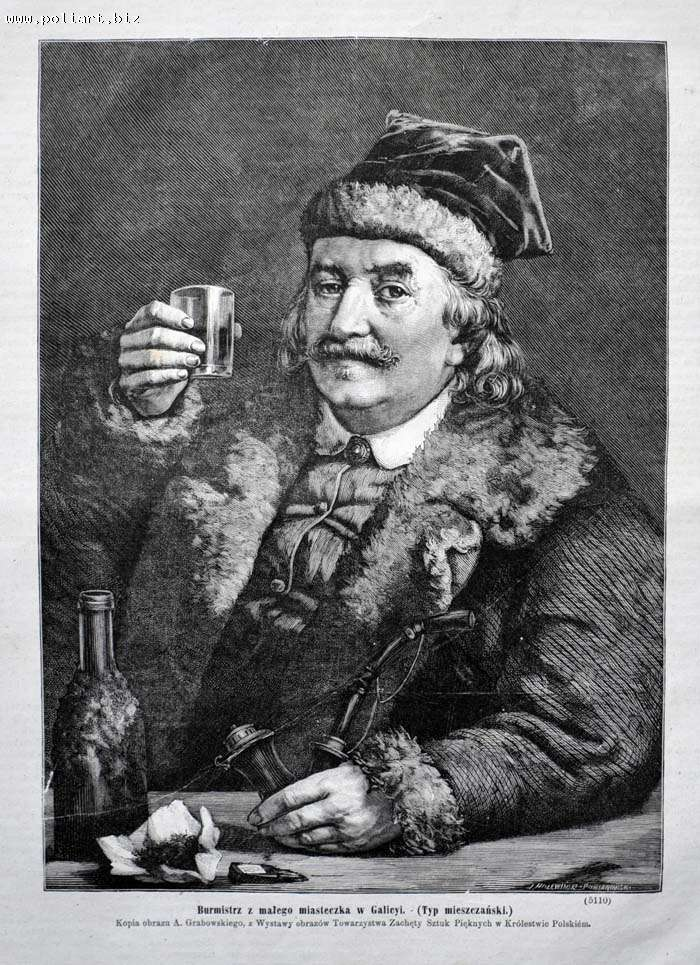
Galician small-town mayor, 1878, after picture by Andrzej Grabowski

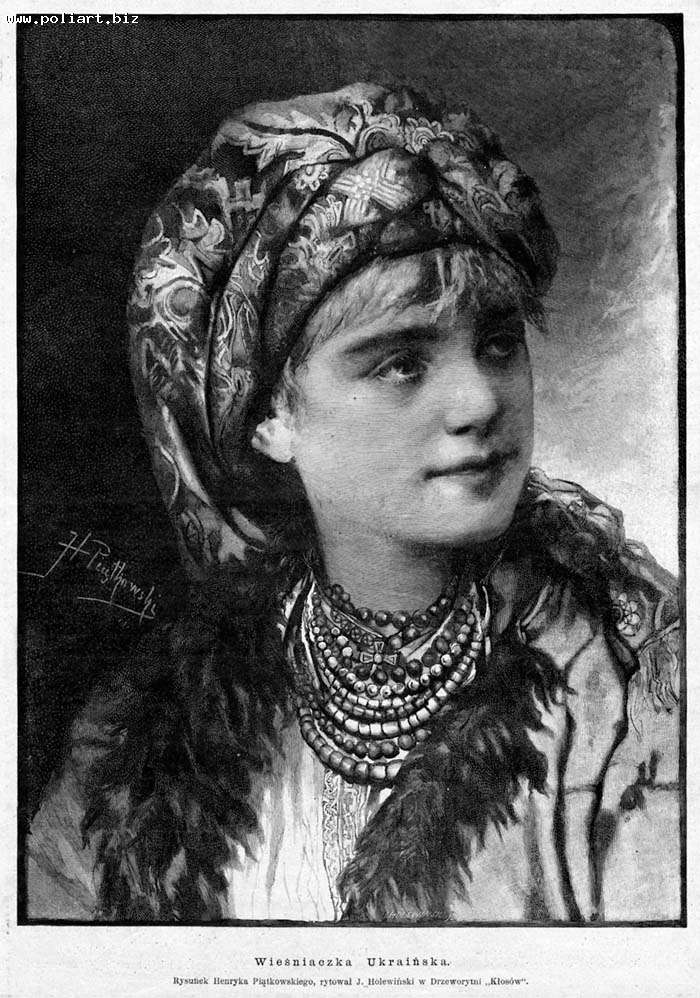
Ukrainian peasant woman, 1886

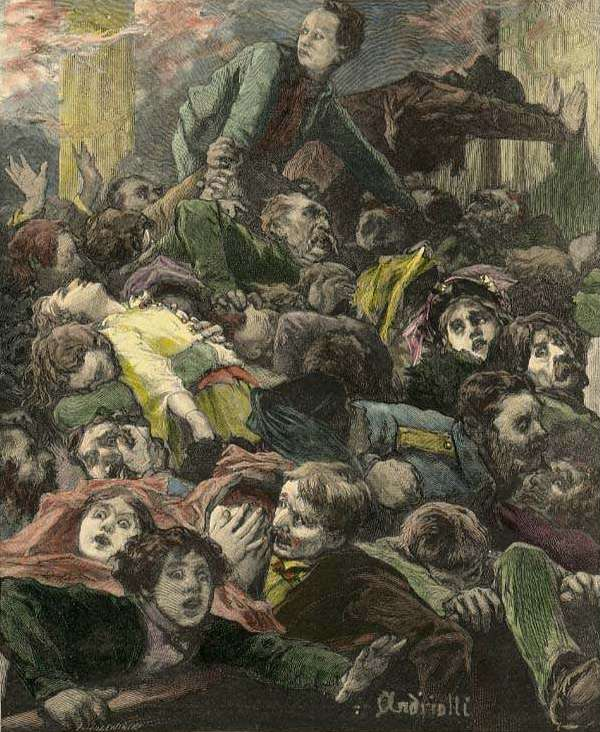
Fire at the Circus, Berdychiv, 1883, after drawing by M.E. Andriolli

== See also ==
- List of Poles
