= Mieszko III of Poland =

Mieszko III
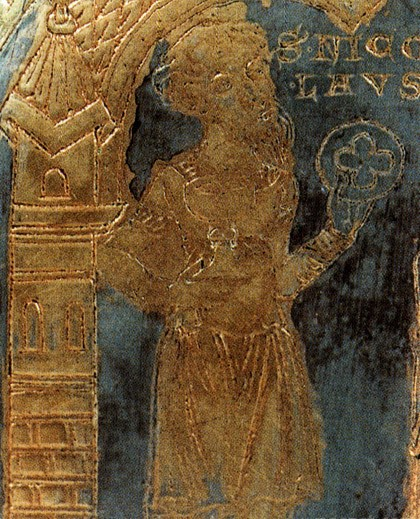
- Mieszko's effigy on a paten, c. 1200

High Duke of Poland
- Tenure: 1173 – 1177; 1191; 1198 – 1199; 1202

Duke of Greater Poland
- Tenure: 1138 – 1177; 1182 – 1202
- Born: c. 1122/1125
- Died: 13 March 1202 (aged 77 or 80); Kalisz
- Burial: Cathedral of Saint Paul the Apostle, Kalisz
- Spouse: Elisabeth of Hungary; Eudoxia of Kiev
- Issue more...: Odon of Poznań; Stephen of Greater Poland; Elisabeth; Wierzchoslawa Ludmilla; Bolesław of Kuyavia; Mieszko the Younger; Władysław III Spindleshanks; Anastasia
- House: Piast dynasty
- Father: Bolesław III Wrymouth
- Mother: Salomea of Berg

Mieszko III (c. 1122/1125 – 13 March 1202), sometimes called Mieszko the Old, was Duke of Greater Poland from 1138 and High Duke of Poland, with interruptions, from 1173 until his death. He was the fourth and second surviving son of Duke Bolesław III Wrymouth of Poland, by his second wife Salomea, daughter of the German count Henry of Berg-Schelklingen.

Under the terms of the seniorate system stemming from his father's testament, Mieszko initially ruled Greater Poland with its capital at Poznań. In 1173, after the death of his elder brother Bolesław IV the Curly, Mieszko became High Duke of Poland, assuming control over Kraków and formal supremacy over the other Piast princes. His rule, however, was marked by internal opposition, largely due to his attempts to strengthen ducal authority with foreign intervention from the Holy Roman Empire, increase revenues, and limit the influence of the nobility and clergy. These policies led to widespread dissatisfaction and ultimately to his deposition in 1177.

Despite being removed from power, Mieszko III remained a persistent and influential political figure for the remainder of his life. He repeatedly attempted to regain the seniorate, forming alliances, exploiting dynastic rivalries, and at times regaining control over Kraków for brief periods. His long political struggle reflects the instability of the seniorate system and the broader fragmentation of Poland into semi-independent principalities during the 12th and early 13th centuries.

Mieszko III died in 1202, still holding authority in Greater Poland, which he had successfully maintained as a hereditary power base. His legacy is contentious; often portrayed by medieval chroniclers as harsh and avaricious, modern historians view him as a ruler attempting to impose stronger centralized governance in a period resistant to such efforts. His reign and repeated bids for supremacy illustrate the structural weaknesses of the Piast seniorate system and its role in prolonging Poland’s political division.

== Early life ==
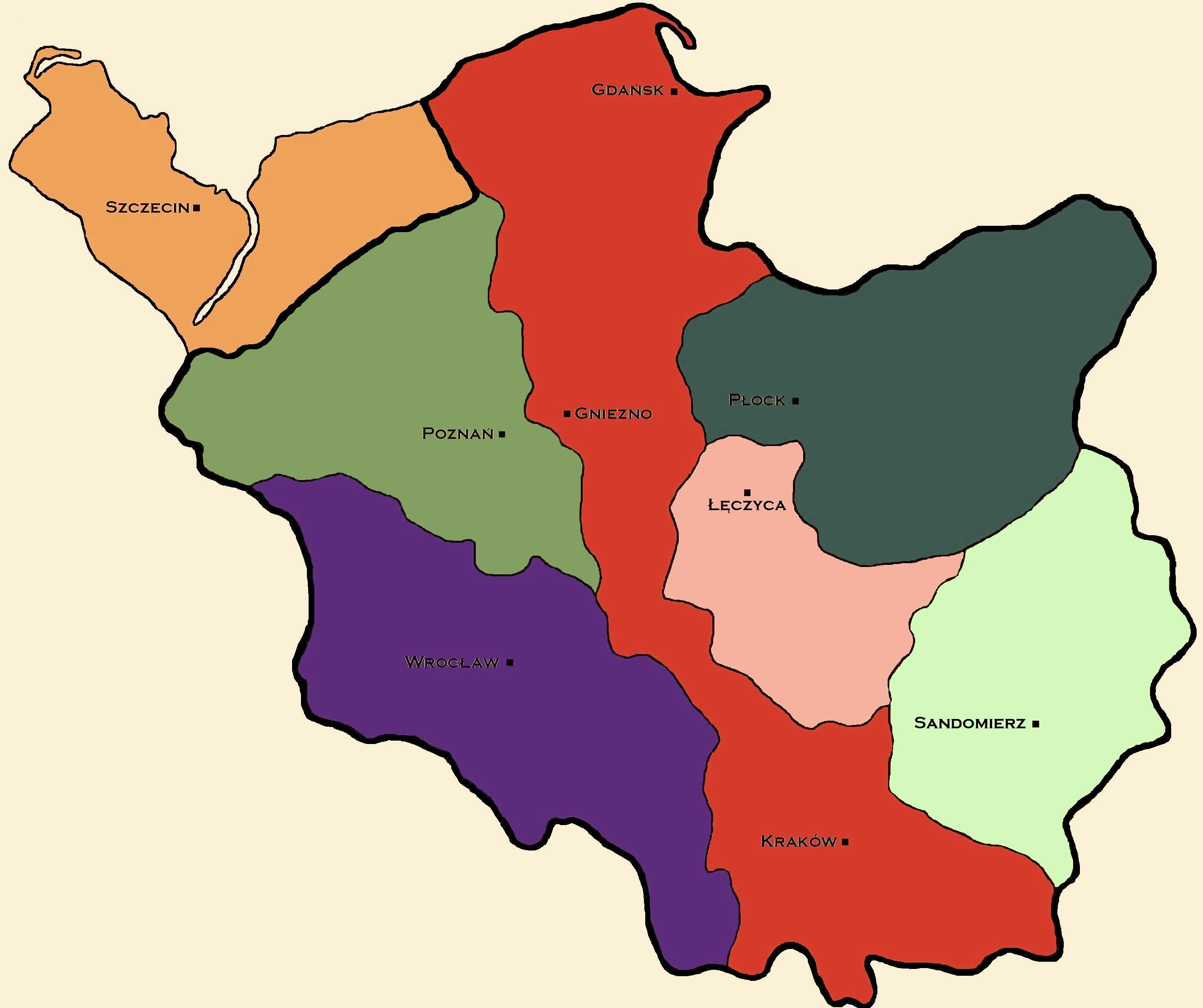
Poland under the sons of Bolesław Wrymouth: Seniorate Province of Władysław II, composed of Eastern Greater Poland, Lesser Poland, Western Kuyavia, Wieluń Land Silesian Province of Władysław II Masovian Province of Bolesław IV composed of Masovia and Eastern Kuyavia Greater Poland Province of Mieszko III composed of Western Great Poland Sandomierz Province of Henry Łęczyca Province of Salomea (Łęczyca Land, Sieradz Land) Pomeranian vassals

According to the 1138 testament of Bolesław III, Mieszko received the newly established Duchy of Greater Poland, comprising the western part of the short-lived Greater Poland. He had previously been duke of Poznań where he had his main residence. His older half-brother, Władysław II, the eldest son of the late duke with his first wife Zbyslava of Kiev, was proclaimed high duke and overlord of the Seniorate Province at Kraków, including the Greater Polish lands of Gniezno and Kalisz, as well as duke of Silesia.

== First conflict with Władysław II ==
The first major conflict with the high duke took place during 1140–1141, when his younger half-brothers Bolesław IV the Curly and Mieszko III, together with their mother but without Władysław's knowledge, divided between them the lands of Łęczyca, which were held only as a wittum by Bolesław's widow Salomea for life and should revert to Władysław's Seniorate Province upon her death.

In 1141, Salomea of Berg organized a meeting at Łęczyca, where she and her sons decided to marry their younger sister Agnes to one of the sons of Grand Prince Vsevolod II of Kiev in order to gain an ally against High Duke Władysław II. Only by Władysław's rapid intervention did the independent plans of the junior dukes fail. Grand Prince Vsevolod II, facing the choice between an alliance with the strong high duke or the weak junior dukes and their mother, chose the former, which was sealed with the betrothal of Władysław's eldest son, Bolesław I the Tall, to Vsevolod's daughter, Zvenislava in 1142. Władysław II had not been invited to the Łęczyca meeting, despite the fact that as the high duke, he had the final voice on Agnes' engagement. In retaliation for this omission, he supported Kievan military actions against Salomea and her sons in the winter of 1142–1143. The first clash between the brothers was a complete success for the high duke.

== Second conflict with Władysław II ==
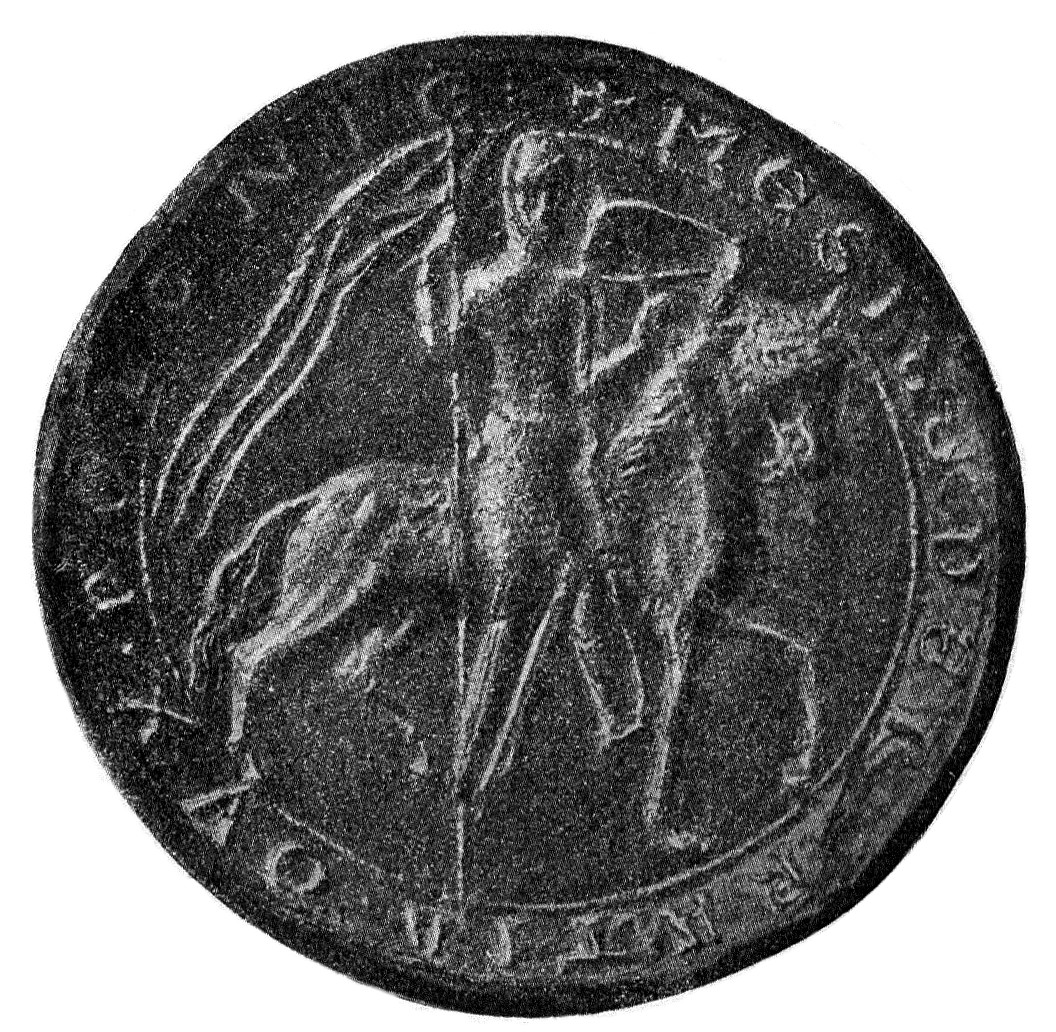
Mieszko's seal from 1145

On 27 July 1144, the Dowager Duchess Salomea died and High Duke Władysław II incorporated the Łęczyca Land into the Seniorate Province as intended by his father's testament. This was again opposed by Bolesław IV and Mieszko III, who wished to give this land to their minor brother, Henry. Fighting took place in 1145. After an unexpected defeat, the high duke was finally able to obtain the victory (Battle of Pilicy), thanks to his Kievan allies.

An agreement was made under which Władysław retained Łęczyca. However, the high duke continued with his intention of reuniting all of Poland under his rule. This provoked the strong opposition from his Silesian voivode Piotr Włostowic, who supported the interests of the junior dukes in order to maintain his own power and position. Władysław, instigated by his wife Agnes of Babenberg, decided to eliminate Włostowic for good. The voivode was captured in an ambush. Agnes demanded Włostowic's death for treason, but the high duke instead chose a terrible punishment: Włostowic was blinded, muted, and expelled from the country. However, the voivode had numerous supporters, who were disgusted by this cruel act. Włostowic fled to the Kievan court, where he began to intrigue against the high duke, thus beginning Władysław's downfall.

== Third conflict and exile of Władysław II ==
The war erupted again in early 1146. This time, Władysław could not count on his Kievan allies, because they were busy with their own issues; in fact, the high duke had sent some of his forces, led by his eldest son Bolesław, to support Great Prince Vsevolod. Władysław's plight had made him swear allegiance to King Conrad III of Germany, half-brother of his wife Agnes. Nevertheless, Władysław was confident of his victory and it initially seemed that success was on his side, as Bolesław IV and Mieszko III, fearing clashes in an open field, escaped to Poznań. At this time, the disaster to the high duke began.

Władysław's cause lost support when he was excommunicated by Archbishop Jacob of Gniezno for his behavior against Piotr Włostowic. He also faced rebellion by his own subjects, who were against his tyrannical rule. The defeat of Władysław was total; by May 1146, all Poland was in the hands of the junior dukes. The former high duke and his family were forced to escape to save their lives, first to Bohemia and later to the Kaiserpfalz of Altenburg in Germany, under the protection of King Conrad III.

Once they had consolidated their rule over Poland, Bolesław IV and Mieszko III made new decisions. Bolesław, as the elder brother, succeeded Władysław as high duke and ruler over Silesia. Mieszko, on the other hand, retained his Duchy of Greater Poland and was satisfied with his role as his brother's ally. Henry, the next-born, finally received his Duchy of Sandomierz. Only the youngest brother, Casimir II, remained without lands.

Urged by his brother-in-law Władysław, King Conrad III of Germany attempted to restore the former high duke to the Polish throne. Eventually, an agreement was reached under which King Conrad accepted the rule of Bolesław IV, and in return the new high duke had to pay a tribute to the German king. The dispute between Władysław and the junior dukes remained unresolved as King Conrad III was busy with the preparations for the Second Crusade to the Holy Land.

== Recognition of the junior duke's authority ==
Meanwhile, the junior dukes had no intention to just wait passively for an arrangement to consolidate their power. In May 1147, they received from Pope Eugene III the confirmation of a foundation for a monastery in Trzemeszno, which was a clear recognition of their sovereignty. In addition, they also sought to improve their relations with the German rulers.

In 1147, simultaneously with the arrival of King Conrad III to the Holy Land, Duke Mieszko III joined the Wendish Crusade against the pagan Polabian Slavs in the former Northern March, which was organized by the Ascanian count Albert the Bear and the Wettin margrave Conrad of Meissen. However, during this trip, Mieszko III politically and militarily supported some Slavic tribes in an effort to protect Polish interests in the Sprevane lands against claims raised by the ambitious Duke Henry the Lion of Saxony. This assistance to pagans infuriated Albert the Bear, who arrived in Kruszwica in early 1148 to improve their alliance. Finally, they made an agreement, which was confirmed by the marriage of the junior dukes' sister Judith with Albert's eldest son Otto.

== Expedition of Emperor Frederick Barbarossa ==
To settle the dispute with Władysław II regarding the Polish throne, Bolesław IV, through the agency of Albert the Bear and Margrave Conrad, agreed to appear at the Imperial Diet in Merseburg in 1152 and pay homage to the newly elected king of Germany, King Conrad's nephew Frederick Barbarossa. However, the high duke broke his promise and remained absent. Meanwhile, Frederick had to secure his rule in the Kingdom of Italy and his coronation as Holy Roman Emperor, wherefore he forged an alliance with Margrave Henry II of Austria, a scion of the House of Babenberg and brother of Władysław's wife Agnes. This coalition brought the Polish affair back to the table.

The Polish campaign of Emperor Frederick began in 1157. For unknown reasons, Bolesław IV and Mieszko III did not try to defend the traditional frontier on the Oder River, but instead burned the castles of Głogów and Bytom and began their retreat into the depths of Greater Poland, where Bolesław's forces finally surrendered to the Imperial troops at Krzyszkowo, near Poznań. After his defeat, the high duke had to ask for forgiveness from the Emperor and the junior dukes had to pay him a large tribute. On Christmas Day in Magdeburg, they promised to send food to the Emperor's Italian expedition and to return the Silesia Province (at least). As a guarantee of the fulfillment, the junior dukes' younger brother, Casimir II, was sent to Germany as a hostage.

Frederick Barbarossa regarded the conflict as resolved and marched against Milan the next year. However, while the Emperor was engaged in Italian affairs, Bolesław IV did nothing to fulfill the agreement. On 30 May 1159, Władysław II died in exile without having ever seen Poland again. Only renewed Imperial pressure enabled Władysław's sons Bolesław the Tall and Mieszko IV Tanglefoot to come into their inheritance four years later, when the junior dukes finally returned Silesia to their nephews in 1163. The province thereby became the ancestral homeland of the Silesian Piasts.

== Death of Henry of Sandomierz and revolt of Casimir II the Just ==
In 1166, Mieszko III and his brothers started another Prussian crusade, whereby Duke Henry of Sandomierz was killed in battle in October of that year. Before his departure, and in case of his death, he had left his duchy to his youngest brother Casimir II the Just, who by their father's testament had remained without lands. However, High Duke Bolesław IV, against his late brother's will, occupied Sandomierz and annexed it to his Seniorate Province.

This decision sparked the rebellion of Casimir II, which was supported by his brother Mieszko III; the magnate Jaksa of Miechów; Sviatoslav, son of Piotr Włostowic; Archbishop Jan I of Gniezno; and Bishop Gedko of Kraków. In February 1168, the rebels gathered at Jędrzejów, where Mieszko III was elected high duke and vested Casimir II with Sandomierz. The final defeat of Bolesław IV did not occur, however, because the high duke accepted the demands of the rebels and divided Henry's duchy into three parts: Wiślica was given to Casimir, Bolesław took Sandomierz proper, and the rest was left to Mieszko.

== Inheritance dispute in Silesia ==
In 1172, another conflict arose among the Silesian Piasts, when Duke Bolesław the Tall chose to ignore the claims of his first-born son, Jaroslaw, by designating his son from his second marriage, Henry I the Bearded, as his sole heir. When Jarosław, forced to become a priest, returned from his German exile, he claimed a share of the Silesian lands. Mieszko III supported his grandnephew in his demands, and a civil war was initiated.

In order to prevent another Imperial intervention, High Duke Bolesław IV sent Mieszko III to Magdeburg, with the sum of 8,000 pieces of silver as a tribute to the Emperor and the promise to resolve this conflict soon. This time, the terms of the 1173 agreement were to be strictly realized. Bolesław the Tall retained his power over Wrocław; however, he had to cede the Silesian Duchy of Opole to his son Jarosław for life and furthermore had to agree on the division of the remaining Silesian lands with his younger brother Mieszko Tanglefoot, who assumed the rule in the new Duchy of Racibórz.

== High Duke of Poland ==
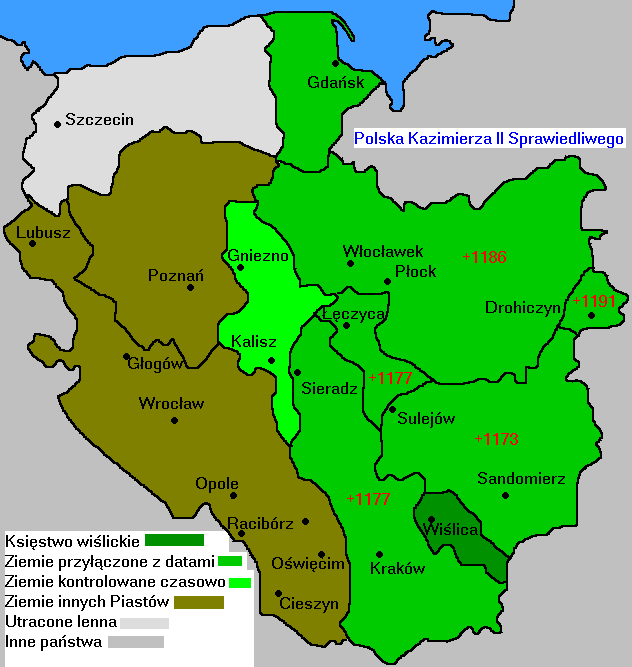
Casimir's acquisitions (in green)

After his brother Bolesław IV died on 3 April 1173, Mieszko III became the new high duke of Poland (dux Totius Poloniae) according to the principle of agnatic seniority. His policy focused on maintaining full power for himself, as the oldest surviving member of the dynasty. Despite his succession to the throne at Kraków, the new high duke remained in Greater Poland, while Lesser Poland was ruled by Henryk Kietlicz as a governor appointed by Mieszko. Harsh tax measures were introduced, which incurred the displeasure of the Lesser Polish magnates. On the other hand, Mieszko had several foreign policy successes through his daughter's marriages: Elisabeth married Duke Soběslav II of Bohemia circa 1173, and through the dynastic arrangement between his daughter Anastasia and the Griffin duke Bogislaw I of Pomerania, Mieszko reinforced Polish sovereignty over the Pomeranian duchy.

In 1177, Mieszko III's first-born son, Odon, fearing for his inheritance, rebelled against his father. He was supported by Bishop Gedko of Kraków, his cousin Bolesław the Tall, and his uncle Casimir II the Just. For Odon, the main reason for his rebellion was the favoritism of Mieszko to the offspring of his second marriage and the attempts of the high duke to force him to become a priest so as to eliminate him from succession. To the other rebels, the reason was the harsh and dictatorial government of the high duke. The rebellion was a complete surprise to Mieszko; during Easter of 1177, he was totally convinced of the loyalty of his relatives, especially when the junior dukes organized a meeting at Gniezno, where the high duke was received by the crowds with cheers.

At first, Greater Poland remained strongly in Mieszko's hands, thanks to his governor, Henryk Kietlicz, his most important follower. At the same time, Casimir II the Just, the clear head of the rebellion, made a divisionary treaty with his allies: all of Silesia was granted to Duke Bolesław the Tall and Greater Poland was given to Odon. This was a significant complication, because since 1173 Bolesław had ruled Silesia alongside his brother Mieszko Tanglefoot and his own son Jarosław of Opole. After they learned of this agreement, both Mieszko Tanglefoot and Jarosław sided with the high duke and rebelled against Bolesław the Tall, who now, busy fighting with his brother and son, lost the opportunity to gain Kraków and obtain the Seniorate Province for himself. In his place, it was Casimir II the Just who took control over the Seniorate Province, and, with this, was proclaimed the new high duke of Poland. After not seeing any possibility of continuing the resistance, Mieszko escaped to Racibórz, under the protection of his nephew and namesake Duke Mieszko Tanglefoot. However, shortly afterwards, the deposed high duke decided to leave Poland and seek foreign support. Odon finally occupied all Greater Poland and was declared duke.

== Exile and return to Greater Poland ==
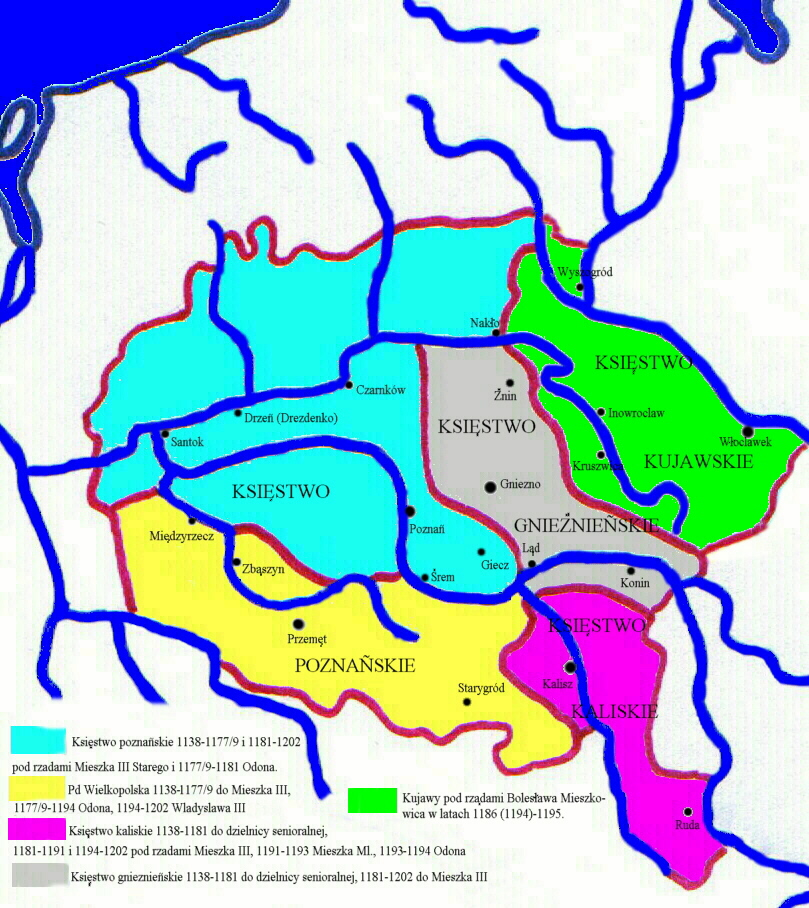
Greater Poland under Mieszko III: Poznań, held by Odon 1177–82 Poznań, held by Odon 1177–1194, by Władysław III 1194–1202 Kalisz, conquered in 1181, held by Mieszko the Younger 1191–93, by Odon 1193–94 Gniezno, conquered in 1181 Kuyavia, held by Bolesław 1186–95

By 1179, Mieszko went to Bohemia, ruled by his son-in-law Soběslav II, who nevertheless refused to help him. Mieszko then turned to Germany and Emperor Frederick Barbarossa, who offered help in his restoration on the Polish throne upon a payment of 10,000 pieces of silver, a sum that Mieszko couldn't amass. Finally, in Pomerania, his other son-in-law, Duke Bogislaw I, agreed to help him. By the agency of his Pomeranian allies, Mieszko forged links with their Polish followers, grouped around Zdzisław, Archbishop of Gniezno, and in 1181, he was able to conquer the eastern Greater Polish lands of Gniezno and Kalisz, which at that time were part of the Seniorate Province. Soon after, Mieszko also managed to recover western Greater Poland, and Odon was pushed to the lands south of the Obra River. In 1182, a formal reconciliation between father and son was achieved. During these events, and for unknown reasons, High Duke Casimir II the Just remained in total passivity; thanks to this, Mieszko had the opportunity to recover all Greater Poland.

Mieszko still had the intention to recover the lordship over all Poland. In 1184, he tried to forge an alliance with Frederick Barbarossa's son, King Henry VI of Germany, offering him a large sum of silver. Casimir II the Just, however, knew his intentions and had simply sent Henry more money than Mieszko.

After his failure with the German king, Mieszko decided to take control over Masovia and Kuyavia, then ruled by his nephew Leszek, the only surviving son of Bolesław IV. Mieszko convinced Leszek to name him as his successor if he died without issue. However, in 1185, one year before his death, Leszek changed his testament and appointed his younger uncle, High Duke Casimir II the Just as his successor, possibly as a result of the harsh proceedings of the Duke of Greater Poland. This time, Mieszko acted quickly, and upon Leszek's death in 1186, he took the Kuyavia region and annexed it to his Duchy. Shortly thereafter, he ceded this land to his son Bolesław.

== Brief restoration ==
In 1191, the foreign policy of High Duke Casimir II the Just triggered dissatisfaction in the Lesser Poland nobility, led by Mieszko's former governor, Henry Kietlicz. With the help of this opposition, Mieszko could finally reconquer Kraków and resume the High Ducal title. He decided to entrust the government of Kraków to one of his sons, either Bolesław or Mieszko the Younger. Casimir, however, quickly regained Kraków and the overlordship and the Prince-Governor was captured; however, he was soon released to be with his father. Probably after the failed expedition over Kraków, Mieszko gave to his son and namesake, Mieszko the Younger, the Greater Polish lands of Kalisz as his own duchy.

When on 2 August 1193, Mieszko the Younger died, his Duchy of Kalisz reverted to the lands of Greater Poland. Shortly thereafter, Mieszko III granted Kalisz to his elder son Odon, who then died eight months later on 20 April 1194. These two early deaths forced Mieszko to make a new divisionary treaty: the duke retained Kalisz for himself, while southern Greater Poland was given to his youngest son Władysław III Spindleshanks, who also assumed the guardianship of the minor son of Odon, Władysław Odonic.

High Duke Casimir II the Just died on 5 May 1194, and Mieszko's pretensions over Lesser Poland were reborn. Unfortunately, this time the local nobility preferred to see on the throne the minor sons of Casimir, Leszek the White and Konrad. Mieszko's attempts to retake the power ended at the bloody Battle of Mozgawa on 13 September 1195, where Mieszko himself was seriously injured and his son Bolesław of Kuyavia died. After the battle, Mieszko withdrew to Kalisz without waiting for the Silesian troops of his allies, Mieszko Tanglefoot and Jarosław of Opole.

== Final settlement ==
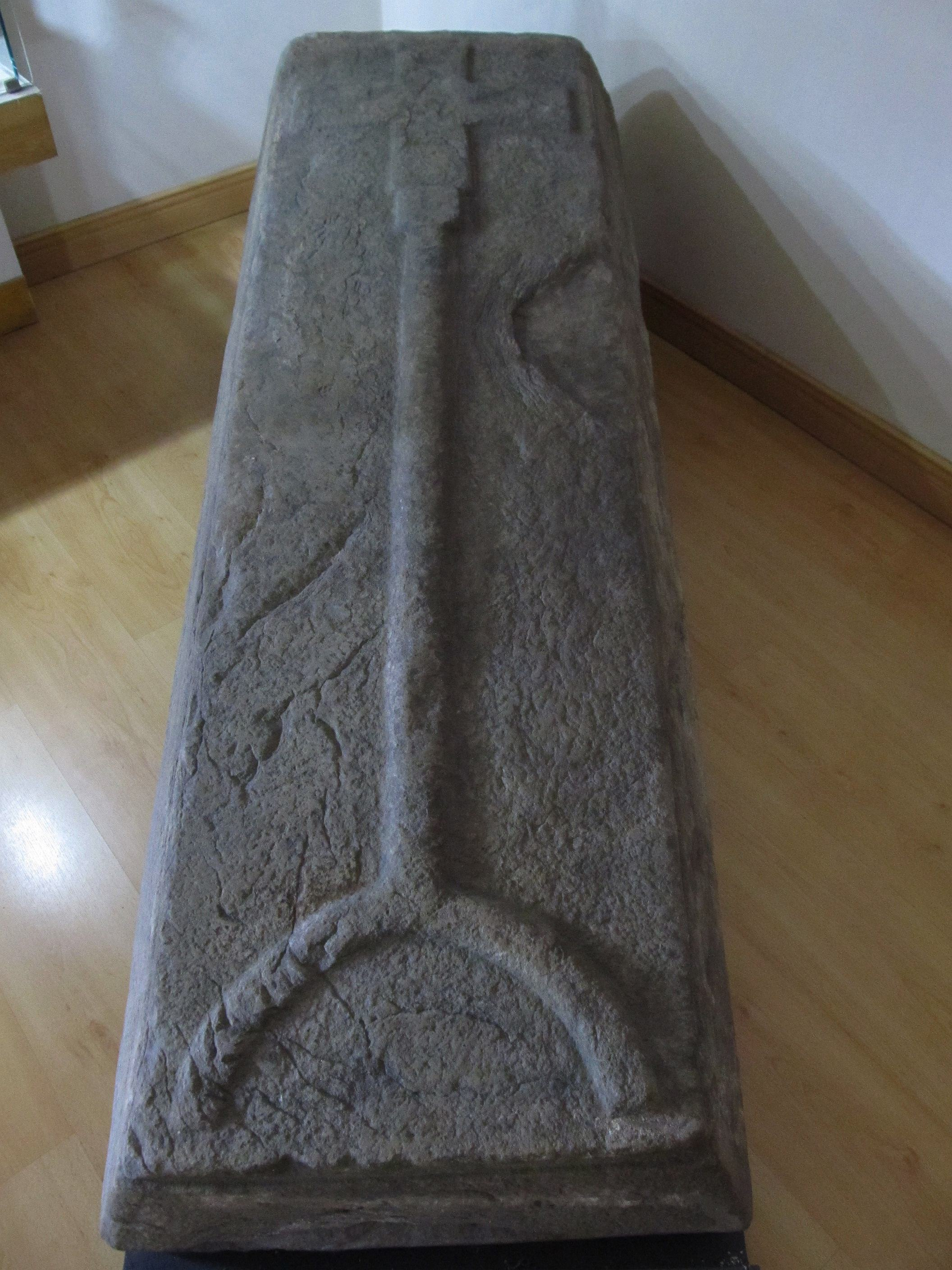
The assumed tombstone of Mieszko III discovered in 1959 and now held at a museum in Kalisz

The Battle of Mozgawa convinced Mieszko that to gain the throne through battle was extremely difficult, so he began to negotiate with the high duke's widow, Helen of Znojmo. In 1198, he was finally allowed to return to Lesser Poland, but was compelled to cede Kuyavia to Casimir's sons.

In 1199, the voivode Mikołaj Gryfita and Bishop Fulko of Kraków again deposed Mieszko and restored Leszek the White as high duke; however, three years later, a new settlement was made and Mieszko was able to return. He retained the title of high duke but was forced to give up part of his powers. He died shortly afterwards; at that time, he had survived all his siblings and his sons except for Władysław III Spindleshanks, who succeeded him as Polish high duke and duke of Greater Poland.

== Marriages and issue ==
Around 1136, Mieszko married firstly with Elisabeth (b. ca. 1128 – d. ca. 1154), daughter of King Béla II of Hungary. They had:

1. Odon (b. ca. 1149 – d. 20 April 1194);
2. Stephen (b. ca. 1150 – d. 18 October 1166/1177?);
3. Elisabeth (b. 1152 – d. 2 April 1209), married firstly ca. 1173 to Duke Soběslav II of Bohemia and secondly c. January 1180 to Conrad II of Landsberg, Margrave of Lusatia;
4. Wierzchoslawa Ludmilla (b. bef. 1153 – d. bef. 1223), married ca. 1167 to Frederick of Bitsch, later duke of Lorraine;
5. Judith (b. bef. 1154 – d. af. 12 December 1201), married ca. 1173 to Bernhard of Anhalt, later duke of Saxony.

By 1154, Mieszko married secondly with Eudoxia of Kiev (b. ca. 1131 – d. aft. 1187), possibly a daughter of Grand Prince Iziaslav II of Kiev. They had:

1. Bolesław (b. 1159 – killed in the Battle of Mozgawą, 13 September 1195);
2. Mieszko the Younger (b. ca. 1160/1165 – d. 2 August 1193);
3. Władysław III Spindleshanks (b. ca. 1161/1167 – d. 3 November 1231);
4. Salomea (b. ca. 1162/1164 – d. 11 May ca. 1183), married bef. 1177 to Prince Ratibor (II) of Pomerania;
5. Anastasia (b. ca. 1164 – d. aft. 31 May 1240), married on 26 April 1177 to Duke Bogislaw I of Pomerania.

== See also ==
- History of Poland (966–1385)

== Bibliography ==
- Davies, Norman (2005). God's Playground A History of Poland. Vol. 1: The Origins to 1795. Oxford University Press.
- Raffensperger, Christian (2018). Conflict, Bargaining, and Kinship Networks in Medieval Eastern Europe. Lexington Books.

Mieszko III of Poland Piast Dynasty Born: ca. 1127 Died: 13 March 1202
New title	Duke of Greater Poland; 1138 – 1177	Succeeded by Odon of Poznań
Preceded by Bolesław IV the Curly	High Duke of Poland; 1173 – 1177	Succeeded by Casimir II the Just
Preceded by Casimir II the Just	Duke of Kalisz; 1182 – 1191	Succeeded by Mieszko the Younger
Preceded by Odon of Poznań	Duke of Greater Poland; 1182 – 1202	Succeeded by Władysław III Spindleshanks
Preceded by Odon of Poznań	Duke of Poznań; 1182 – 1202	Succeeded by Władysław III Spindleshanks
Preceded by Casimir II the Just	Duke of Gniezno; 1182 – 1202	Succeeded by Władysław III Spindleshanks
Preceded by Casimir II the Just	High Duke of Poland; 1191	Succeeded by Casimir II the Just
Preceded by Odon of Poznań	Duke of Kalisz; 1194 – 1202	Succeeded by Władysław III Spindleshanks
Preceded by Bolesław of Kuyavia	Duke of Kuyavia; 1195 – 1198	Succeeded by Leszek the White; Konrad I of Masovia
Preceded by Leszek the White	High Duke of Poland; 1198 – 1199	Succeeded by Leszek the White
Preceded by Leszek the White	High Duke of Poland; 1202	Succeeded by Władysław III Spindleshanks
