= Władysław III Spindleshanks =

High Duke of Poland
- Reign: 1202 – 1206
- Predecessor: Mieszko III the Old
- Successor: Leszek I the White
- Reign: 1228 – 1229
- Predecessor: Leszek I the White
- Successor: Konrad I of Masovia

Duke of Greater Poland
- Reign: 1202 – 1229
- Predecessor: Mieszko III the Old
- Successor: Władysław Odonic
- Born: c. 1167
- Died: 3 November 1231
- Spouse: Lucia of Rügen
- House: House of Piast
- Father: Mieszko III the Old
- Mother: Eudoxia of Kiev

Władysław III Spindleshanks (Polish: Władysław Laskonogi; b. 1161/1167 – 3 November 1231), of the Piast dynasty, was Duke of Greater Poland (during 1194–1202 only over the southern part and during 1202–1229 over all the land), High Duke of Poland and Duke of Kraków during 1202–1206 and 1228–1229, Duke of Kalisz during 1202–1206, ruler of Lubusz during 1206–1210 and 1218–1225, and ruler over Gniezno during 1216–1217.

He was the fifth son of Mieszko III the Old, Duke of Greater Poland and since 1173 High Duke of Poland, but the third-born from his second marriage with Eudoxia, daughter of Grand Prince Iziaslav II of Kiev.

The nickname "Spindleshanks" (Laskonogi) was given to Władysław in the Chronicle of Greater Poland. Jan Długosz assumed that this was in reference to Władysław's unusually long and thin legs.

== Under the rule of Mieszko III the Old ==
The first appearance of Władysław in contemporary sources was around 1168 in reference to the congress of Jędrzejów where, as a small child, he was a witness in a donation to the local Cistercian monastery.

Between 1177 and 1179, Władysław, his parents and siblings were forced to leave Poland as a result of the rebellion of Casimir II the Just and Odon, Mieszko III's eldest son from his first marriage, who resented the clear favoritism shown by his father to the offspring of his second marriage. Władysław returned to his family only in 1181 and, despite being legally an adult, was not given his own district. Around 1186, Władysław married Lucia, daughter of Jaromar I, Prince of Rügen. The union, whose principal purpose was to increase the influence of Mieszko III in Western Pomerania, was childless.

After the death of Władysław's half-brother Odon on 20 April 1194, Władysław assumed the control of the Duchy in Southern Greater Poland (the Obra River), as guardian of his minor nephew Władysław Odonic (son of Odon, born ca. 1190).

On 13 September 1195, the death of his only surviving brother Bolesław in the bloody Battle of Mozgawa left Władysław as the sole heir of Mieszko III, and he began trying to restore the lands controlled by his father in the Duchy of Kraków and to assume the overlordship of Poland.

== Duke of Kraków and Greater Poland ==
Mieszko III died on 13 March 1202. Władysław could succeed his father without barriers in Kraków, Greater and Lesser Poland, thanks to the support of the powerful voivode Mikołaj Gryfita. However, an opponent soon arose to the throne of Kraków: the eldest son of Casimir II the Just, Leszek I the White, but his candidacy collapsed because he based its rule on the count palatine Goworek, who was a stubborn enemy of the voivode Mikołaj.

== Loss of the Kraków throne ==
Władysław's rule as Duke of Kraków and High Duke of Poland lasted for four years, until 1206, when, after the death of his principal supporter voivode Mikołaj Gryfita, Leszek I the White returned to the capital. The cause of the rebellion was a tough enforcement of rights against the powerful nobility and the alliance with the Pomeranians. Some historians placed the loss of Kraków by Władysław in an earlier period: a few months after the death of his father in 1202. In the absence of sources for this period, however, this fact is difficult to verify.

== Plans to restore Polish suzerainty over Pomerania ==
Interest in the Pomeranian affairs, Władysław was involved in two events. The first was a solemn meeting with King Valdemar II of Denmark, during which he attempted to resolve disputes and determine the zone of influence. The second event was a surprising agreement with the Duke of Wrocław, Henry I the Bearded, under which Władysław surrendered the Duchy of Kalisz (part of the patrimony of his nephew Władysław Odonic) in exchange of Lubusz, whereby it was easier to pursue an active policy on the Baltic coast. But in 1209, Władysław lost Lubusz, taken by Conrad II of Landsberg, Margrave of Lusatia (his brother-in-law), who defeated the Duke in the Battle of Lubusz. Eventuality Henry I the Bearded, in the campaign between August 1210 and March 1211, could take Lubusz from the Germans, using the confusion after the death of Conrad II (6 May 1210) and the disputes about his heritage among the members of the House of Wettin.

== Conflicts with Archbishop Henry Kietlicz and Władysław Odonic ==
The loss of Kalisz, put into foreign hands, caused a deep dissatisfaction in Władysław Odonic, who considered this land as part of his patrimony. The young prince (at that time around 16 years) managed to gain the support of the Greater Poland nobles and foremost the Archbishop of Gniezno, Henry Kietlicz, who wanted the opportunity to obtain from Spindleshanks privileges for the local Church and thus limit the power of the ruling house.

However, despite the efforts of both Odonic and Archbishop Kietlicz, the rebellion was short-lived and unsuccessful. Both Kietlicz and Władysław Odonic had to flee to the court of Henry I the Bearded. The excommunication launched by Kietlicz against Spindleshanks was of little help to the insurgents, because of the support given to Mieszko III's son by Arnold II, Bishop of Poznań.

Somewhat surprising was the reaction to these events by Henry I the Bearded, who not only accepted the exiles, but also endowed Władysław Odonic with the Duchy of Kalisz, however, with the condition to return to him after he regained his inheritance. At the same time, the Archbishop Kietlicz went to Rome, where he had a personal meeting with Pope Innocent III. The protest made to the Holy See successfully blocked the attempt to appeal the curse made by Spindleshanks. The Pope also instructed the other Polish princes to help the Archbishop of Gniezno return to his diocese.

== Congress of Głogów and reconciliation with Archbishop Kietlicz ==
Henry I the Bearded became a mediator between the warring parties, and on Christmas Day of 1208, he invited the two Greater Poland Dukes, the Archbishop of Gniezno and the Bishops of Wrocław, Lubusz and Poznań to a meeting in Głogów. After long discussions, a settlement was finally reached between Spindleshanks and the Archbishop Kietlicz, who could return to Gniezno with all his goods restored, in exchange for lifting the anathema against the Duke. However, the conflict between uncle and nephew remained unsolved.

== Congress of Borzykowa ==
In 1210, Spindleshanks supported the efforts of Mieszko I Tanglefoot, who wanted the restitution of the Testament of Bolesław III Wrymouth, under which the Silesian branch is the rightful overlords of Poland. At this point, Władysław was probably the immediate oldest member of the Piast dynasty after Mieszko I, and therefore, he certainly expected that after the imminent death of the venerable Duke of Racibórz, he could receive the title of High Duke and the Duchy of Kraków. However, according to some historians, Henry I the Bearded was older than Spindleshanks. This was most probable, and was reflected in the bull issued by Pope Innocent III on 9 June 1210, where the Holy See demanded the restitution of all the hereditary rights of the Silesian branch according to Bolesław III's testament and also excommunicated Leszek I the White; this edict was made by the request of an anonymous Duke of Silesia, which could have only been Henry I the Bearded (because Mieszko I used the title of Duke of Raciborz-Opole). The situation became quite confused, as nobody was sure who held the real power.

In July 1210, Leszek I the White, Henry I the Bearded, Konrad I of Masovia and Władysław Odonic met with the local Bishops at the Synod of Borzykowa, with the purpose of solving the problematic and mysterious Papal Bull. Mieszko I Tanglefoot wasn't present at the meeting; with an army and thanks to the support of the Gryfici family, he could enter in Kraków and easily took Wawel. However, Archbishop Kietlicz didn't intend to accept the existing situation, and having received from the young princes and the local Church hierarchy words of support, began his efforts in Rome to withdraw the fateful Bull. These treatments were successful, and when in May 1211 Mieszko I Tanglefoot died, Leszek I the White was able to return to the throne of Kraków. The intentions of the older generation had failed.

== Early rise of Archbishop Kietlicz and Władysław Odonic ==
In 1215 Władysław Spindleshanks' position was further weakened by the growth of the power of Archbishop Henry Kietlicz, who supported the provisions of IV Lateran Council, and the subsequent congress of the Junior princes in Wolbórz, where Leszek I the White, Konrad I of Mazovia, Władysław Odonic and Casimir I of Opole not only agreed to extend the economic and legal benefits for the Church, but also supported the claims of Odonic to obtain his rightful inheritance. Finally, in 1216, in order to avoid an armed confrontation, Spindleshanks gave Odonic the district who previously belonged to his father (the exact territory was a matter of dispute between historians: some believed that Odonic received Southern Greater Poland with the Obra River as frontier, and others consider that the young prince received the entire district of Poznań together with his castle). The agreement between uncle and nephew was confirmed by a Bull of Pope Honorius III issued on 9 February 1217. There has also been an official reconciliation with the Archbishop Kietlicz, who received the privilege from Spindleshanks to receive the revenues from the Cistercian monastery of Łekno.

== Fall of Archbishop Kietlicz and the Treaty with Leszek I the White ==
The terms of the reconciliation accorded in 1216 lasted less than a year. The proud and ambitious attitude of Archbishop Kietlicz effectively discouraged his supporters and stopped his meddling in Piast Dukes affairs. His importance suffered a further decline after the defeat of the policies of Pope Honorius III.

In 1217, an unexpected treaty was concluded between the previous antagonists Leszek I the White and Władysław Spindleshanks, under which if one or both rulers died without male issue, the other could inherit all his domains. This agreement clearly affected the interests of the Duke of Kalisz Władysław Odonic, Spindleshanks' nearest male relative.

== Deposition of Władysław Odonic ==
In the same year, the Duke of Greater Poland took advantage of the benevolent neutrality of Henry I the Bearded and finally decided to resolve the conflict with Odonic and took the district of his nephew, forcing him to flee the country. The formal alliance between Spindleshanks and Henry I the Bearded (similar to the previous agreement with Leszek I the White) took place at the end of 1217 or early 1218, during an assembly in Sądowel, through the mediation of the Bishops Paweł II of Poznań and Wawrzyniec of Lubusz. For unknown reasons, the content of the arrangements was beneficial only to the Duke of Greater Poland, who not only received the permission to retain Odonic's district (which included parts of Kalisz, who under the agreement of 1206, was returned to Silesia), but also obtain the district of Lubusz (captured in 1209 by the Margrave of Lusatia Conrad II but recovered by Henry I the Bearded one year later) during his lifetime. The agreement of Sądowel was ratified by a special papal bull issued on 9 May 1218, which further broke down the power of Archbishop Kietlicz.

The first test of the Triumvirate (Władysław III Spindleshanks, Henry I the Bearded and Leszek I the White) was the death in 1219 of Archbishop Henry Kietlicz and the common choice for the post of Archbishop, the chancellor Wincenty z Niałka, one of Spindleshanks' closest associates.

== Return of Władysław Odonic ==
Despite the many benefits, Władysław Spindleshanks received in the congress of Sądowel, he didn't participate in a national campaign against the pagan Prussians. The reason for this was the actions of his nephew Władysław Odonic, who, thanks to the hospitality and collaboration of Swantopolk II of Pomerania (probably Odonic's brother-in-law), began his struggle against the authority of his uncle. The situation worsened when, in October 1223, Odonic surprisingly attacked and managed to conquer the town of Ujście, and soon afterwards (in 1225) the adjacent district of Nakło.

Spindleshanks' situation became more complicated after the loss of Lubusz in 1225, captured by Louis IV, Landgrave of Thuringia, who took advantage of the constant fights of the Greater Poland Duke with his nephew and could conquer this important territory.

== New phase in the War against Władysław Odonic. Defeat at Ujście ==
The decisive battle between uncle and nephew took place in 1227. Spindleshanks sent an army under the command of the voivode Dobrogost to besiege Ujście, but he couldn't take the strong local fortress, and on 15 July, Odonic surprisingly attacked the voivode, who was completely defeated and killed. Thanks to this victory, Władysław Odonic was able to take control over almost all Greater Poland; however, Odonic's ally, Swantopolk II, unexpectedly broke the existing treaty, took Nakło and proclaimed himself Duke and ended his homage to Leszek I the White.

== Congress of Gąsawa and murder of Leszek I the White ==
The alliance of his nephew with the Pomeranian ruler put Spindleshanks' rule in jeopardy, and he feared that he could lose the remainder of his lands; so, he decided to make a peaceful solution to his disputes with Odonic. On St. Martin's day (11 November) 1227, a solemn congress of Piast rulers, bishops and nobles in the small Kuyavian district of Gąsawa was convened, where this and other delicate issues were discussed in order to take further steps. In addition to the instigator of the reunion, Leszek I the White, were also present his brother Konrad I of Masovia, Henry I the Bearded, Wladyslaw Odonic (whose assistance is disputed by historians), the entire episcopate and numerous representatives of Polish magnate families. For unknown reasons, Władysław Spindleshanks didn't appear in Gąsawa, although it is believed that both Archbishop Wincenty of Gniezno and Bishop Paweł II of Poznań watched his interests. Nobody expected the tragedy, which occurred on the morning of 24 November: during a short break between the deliberations in the town of Marcinkowo Górne, a group of Pomeranians attacked both Leszek I the White and Henry I the Bearded; Leszek I was killed and Henry I severely wounded, but did survive.

Contemporary sources and later historiography clearly recognize Swantopolk II as the crime's author. However, some historians believed that Władysław Odonic was an accomplice, passing all the plans and conversations to the Pomeranian ruler during the congress (according to the most recent work of Tomasz Jurek). Historians speculated that in 1227, the hostility between the Duke of Pomerania and Odonic suddenly appeared after Swantopolk II took Nakło. According to the proponents of the view that Odonic participated in the Gąsawa crime, they believed that the capture of Nakło was only a distraction from the true intentions of Swantopolk II and Odonic. There are also other versions of these events, but because of the shortage of resources and ambiguity, there are several theories. Some historians believe that Władysław Spindleshanks was involved in Leszek I's death because it was he, and not Swantopolk II, who obtained the greatest benefits from the crime. This is, though very unlikely, as Władysław was later entrusted with the protection of Leszek's son, Bolesław, and the widow duchess Grzymisława wouldn't do such a thing as give her son to her husband's murderer.

== Recovery of the Kraków throne ==
After the crime of Gąsawa Władysław Spindleshanks turns directly to the offensive. At the beginning of next year and under unknown circumstances, the Duke of Greater Poland, with the help of Silesian troops, could defeat his nephew Odonic, who was taken prisoner. Spindleshanks then went to Lesser Poland, where he presented his claim over the throne of Kraków on the basis of the agreement of mutual succession between him and Leszek I the White, signed in 1217. Although the Duke of Kraków left a one-year-old son, Bolesław V, it was clear that until he reached the proper age, the rule over Kraków had to be taken over by someone else. At the same time, Leszek I's brother Konrad I of Masovia appears in Lesser Poland and also put his claim over the Kraków throne.

The formal election of the new High Duke of Poland was made at a meeting in Wiślica on 5 May 1228, where most of the powerful nobles gathered around the Bishop of Kraków, Iwo Odrowąż, the voivode Marek z Brzeźnicy, Governor of Kraków and Pakosław the Old, voivode of Sandomierz. There was rejected the candidacy of Konrad I of Masovia in favour of Spindleshanks.

== Congress of Cienia ==
The choice of Władysław Spindleshanks as High Duke wasn't an unconditional choice, because during an assembly organized in Cienia Pierwsza, he was compelled to sign two important documents. In the first, the Duke of Greater Poland ensured several privileges to the Church and even expanded it. The second was about the infant son of Leszek I the White, Bolesław V: the new High Duke took over his guardianship and making him his general heir. At the same time, he promised not to introduce any new law without the consent of the nobility and clergy of Lesser Poland. In this way, for the first time, the royal power in Poland was made by election. Spindleshanks assumed the direct rule only over Kraków: the authority over Sandomierz was handed by Bolesław V's mother Grzymislawa, although formally, because in the end it remained under the control of the High Duke.

== Election of Henry I the Bearded as Governor of Krakow ==
Unfortunately, the political situation soon turned against Władysław Spindleshanks. His nephew Władysław Odonic, defeated and imprisoned by him, could escape to Płock and resume the war against him, which made the Duke of Greater Poland unable to prepare for the expected invasion against Konrad I of Masovia (who became now an ally of Odonic). Therefore, he decided, with the approval of Kraków citizens (led by the powerful families of Odrowąż and Gryfici), to choose Silesian Duke Henry I the Bearded as ruler of the city, but only with the title of governor. Spindleshanks' concession was probably given for the military support that Henry I gave to him; in addition, the Silesian Duke obtained the promise of inheritance over Greater Poland, which was indeed a violation of the provisions contained in the Congress of Cienia, where Spindleshanks declared that Bolesław V was his heir.

== War against Konrad I of Masovia and Władysław Odonic ==
Konrad I's military attack on Lesser Poland took place in the summer of 1228. The expedition, however, didn't bring success, because he was surprisingly attacked by Prince Henry, eldest son and heir of Henry I the Bearded, who successfully defeated the Masovian Duke in the Battles of Międzyborzem, Skałą and Wrocieryżem. Konrad didn't give up and one year later he again started military operations, this time with better results, especially after the capture and imprisonment of Henry I after a supposed meeting in Spytkowice; this event successfully paralyzed the opponents of his late brother Leszek the White and Konrad managed to control most of Lesser Poland, although he released Henry I from captivity thanks to the efforts of his wife Hedwig of Andechs. Immediately, he deprived his nephew Bolesław V of the Duchy of Sandomierz and invested his own son Bolesław with this land. Shortly thereafter, Konrad I and his ally Odonic began the direct war against Spindleshanks. Konrad I unsuccessfully besieged Kalisz, despite the help of Russian troops. Spindleshanks, too busy in his fight against Odonic in the north, couldn't come in time to aid the city; however, the powerful city walls were too much for the Silesian Duke, who was forced to withdraw.

== Defeat and escape ==
Spindleshanks was soon defeated by his nephew under unknown circumstances and forced to flee to the court of Duke Casimir I of Opole in Racibórz. The deposition of young Bolesław V by his uncle was the excuse for Henry I to attack the Masovian Duke. Spindleshanks also took advantage of this and renewed his alliance with the Silesian Duke, with the formal transfer of all his rights over both Greater and Lesser Poland to Henry I.

== Last attempt to recover Greater Poland ==
In the spring of 1231, Henry I made his last expedition with Spindleshanks against Władysław Odonic. Despite initial success, thanks to the help given by Paweł, Bishop of Poznań, and Greater Poland noble families Nałęczów, Łabędziów and Niałków, the siege ended in failure at the walls of Gniezno.

== Mysterious death and succession ==
The expedition against his nephew Odonic was the last political activity of Spindleshanks. Following the information of medieval sources, although not properly confirmed by other sources of information, the demise of the former Duke of Greater Poland was under scandalous circumstances. According to the chronicles from the Cistercian French monk Alberic of Trois-Fontaines, the almost seventy-year-old Spindleshanks was murdered in Środa Śląska by a German girl whom he tried to rape. According to some historians, the story is not about Spindleshanks, but his nephew Władysław Odonic.

Another source who confirm the unworthy conduct of Spindleshanks came from Jan Długosz, who wrote that in the last year of his life, his subjects despised him because of his "fornication with prostitutes".

The date of death of Władysław III Spindleshanks was generally placed on 3 November 1231 (another proposed date, 18 August, was suggested only by Jan Długosz, wasn't confirmed, and is rejected by historians).

It is not known where he was buried. Some researchers, based on the information that the Duke died in exile, believe that Władysław III Spindleshanks was buried in Silesia, perhaps in Racibórz. Others, based on late chroniclers, assume that he was buried in the Benedictine monastery in Lubiń.

At his death, Henry I the Bearded, by virtue of the inheritance treaty, became the main claimant over both Greater and Lesser Poland, but his rights over these areas were soon contested and he had to fight to conquer both.

== See also ==
- Poland during the Piast dynasty

Władysław III Spindleshanks House of Piast Born: ~1161/1166 Died: 3 November 1231
Preceded by Mieszko III the Old	Duke of Greater Poland; 1202 – 1229	Succeeded by Władysław Odonic
Preceded by Mieszko III the Old	High Duke of Poland; 1202 – 1206	Succeeded by Leszek I the White
Preceded by Leszek I the White	High Duke of Poland; 1228 – 1229	Succeeded by Konrad I of Masovia
