= Wienhausen Abbey =

Abbey in Lower Saxony, Germany

Coordinates: 52°34′50.66″N 10°11′6.1″E

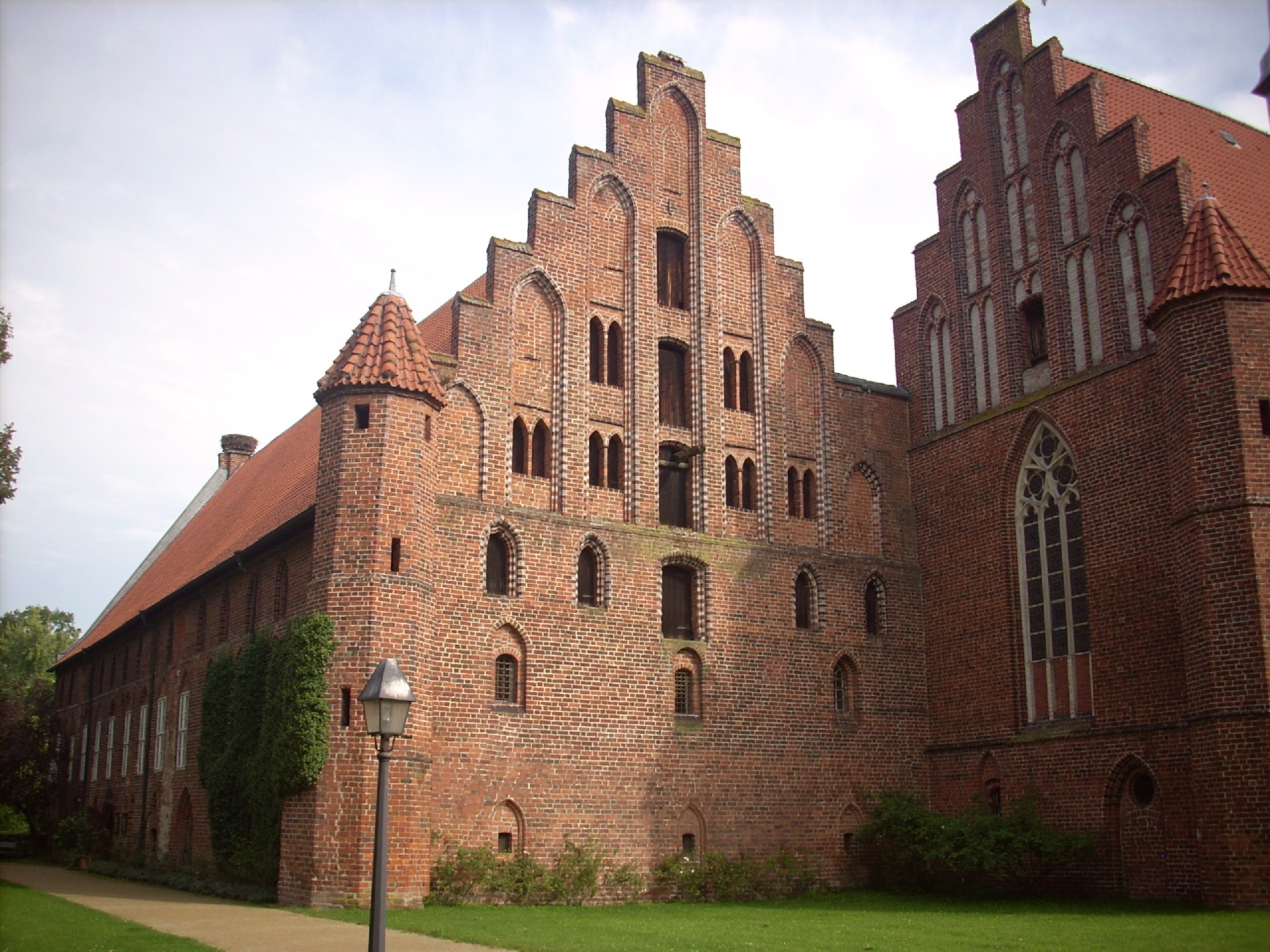
Wienhausen Abbey

Wienhausen Abbey or Convent (German: Kloster Wienhausen) near Celle in Lower Saxony, Germany, is a convent of Evangelical Lutheran women, which, until the Reformation was a Cistercian Catholic nunnery. The abbey owns significant artworks and artifacts, including a collection of tapestries and the earliest surviving example of a type of eyeglasses.

== History ==
The abbey was established in Wienhausen, 15 kilometers (9.3 mi) from the town of Celle, on the bank of the Aller, in or about 1230 by Agnes von Landsberg, daughter-in-law of Henry the Lion, Duke of Saxony and Bavaria. According to the Wienhausen town chronicle, this was the relocation of a monastic foundation made 10 years previously on a site at Nienhagen several kilometers away, which was moved because it had been built on marshland.

In 1233 the foundation of the nunnery here was officially confirmed by Konrad II of Riesenberg, bishop of Hildesheim, who transferred to the new abbey the archdeaconry church that had stood in Wienhausen since the mid 11th century, and the tithes of several villages. The nuns lived according to the Cistercian rule although it is unclear to what extent they were ever formally part of the Cistercian hierarchy.

In 1469 the abbey came under the influence of the reformist Windesheim Congregation and were obliged to tighten up their Cistercian practice; one side-effect of the reform was that the then abbess, Katharina von Hoya, was removed to another nunnery.

In the 16th century, Duke Ernest of Brunswick-Lüneburg enforced the Reformation in his duchy. Despite the opposition of the entire community, the nunnery was transformed from a Roman Catholic into a Lutheran establishment for unmarried noble women (Damenstift) in 1531, after the Duke had broken the resistance of the community by the demolition of the provostry and most of the chapels in the church, and the confiscation of the provostry property, which formed a substantial part of the abbey's income. The destroyed buildings were rebuilt 19 years later (in about 1550) as half-timbered structures. In 1587, the first officially Protestant abbess was installed, and in 1616 the community stopped wearing Cistercian habits, although it had a reputation for secret leanings to Catholicism for many years afterwards.

== Architecture ==
Most of the historic buildings, in the style known as Brick Gothic, are well-preserved. East of the church are a water mill and the farm building. Directly north of the church and at right angles to it are the two conventual building ranges: one dates from the Middle Ages, while the one to the east is a post-Reformation half-timbered building of about 1550. Between them is a two-storey cloister, a Brick Gothic masterpiece.

The church consists of two parts: the original Romanesque 11th century church that belonged to the archdeaconry once based here, that predates the foundation of the nunnery, and originally had a tower that was demolished, in keeping with Cistercian practice, when the abbey was first established here; and a Gothic church built onto the west end of the earlier structure, which comprises the nuns' private chapel (Nonnenchor) on the upper floor and the strangers' church or pilgrims' hall (Pilgersaal) on the ground floor. The Romanesque and the Gothic parts of the building are today separated by a wooden partition wall and are used independently.

Completed in the 14th century, the nuns' chapel is remarkable even among Gothic places of worship for its intricate decorations. The ceiling and walls are completely covered with biblical images and ornaments, which portrayed, among other subjects, the Creation, and the life, death and resurrection of Jesus, and his reign in New Jerusalem. Several artifacts were discovered during a renovation in 1953, including the world's oldest preserved rivet spectacles which date back to the 14th or 15th century. Other artefacts included small religious images on wood or paper, likely used to aid private devotion.

The abbey is known for its collection of Gothic tapestries from the 14th and 15th centuries. Each year following Pentecost, the tapestries are on public display. Subjects include both Christian and secular themes, e.g. the legend of Tristan and Isolde, several saints' stories (including Saints Thomas, Anne and Elizabeth), as well as the Mirror of Human Salvation. The art treasures are maintained and displayed by the members of the community.

Today, with several other women's Lutheran religious houses in the area, collectively known as the Lüneburger Klöster, Wienhausen is maintained by the Monastic Chamber of Hanover (German: Klosterkammer Hannover), an institution of the former Kingdom of Hanover founded by Prince-Regent George IV in 1818, in order to manage and preserve the estates of Lutheran convents on their behalf, now continued as an institution of Hanover's successor state of Lower Saxony subordinate to its Ministry/Department of Science and Culture.

== Images ==
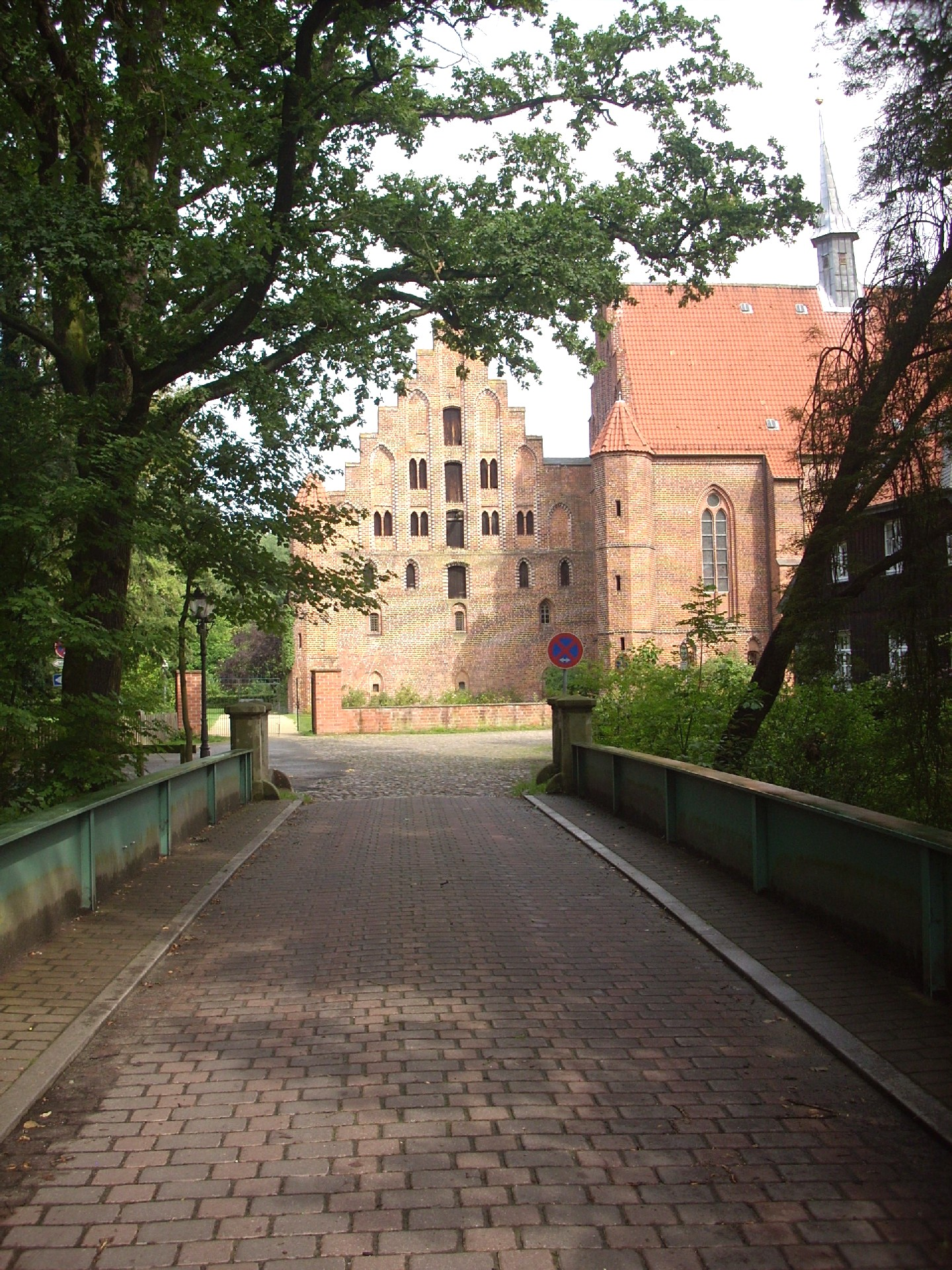

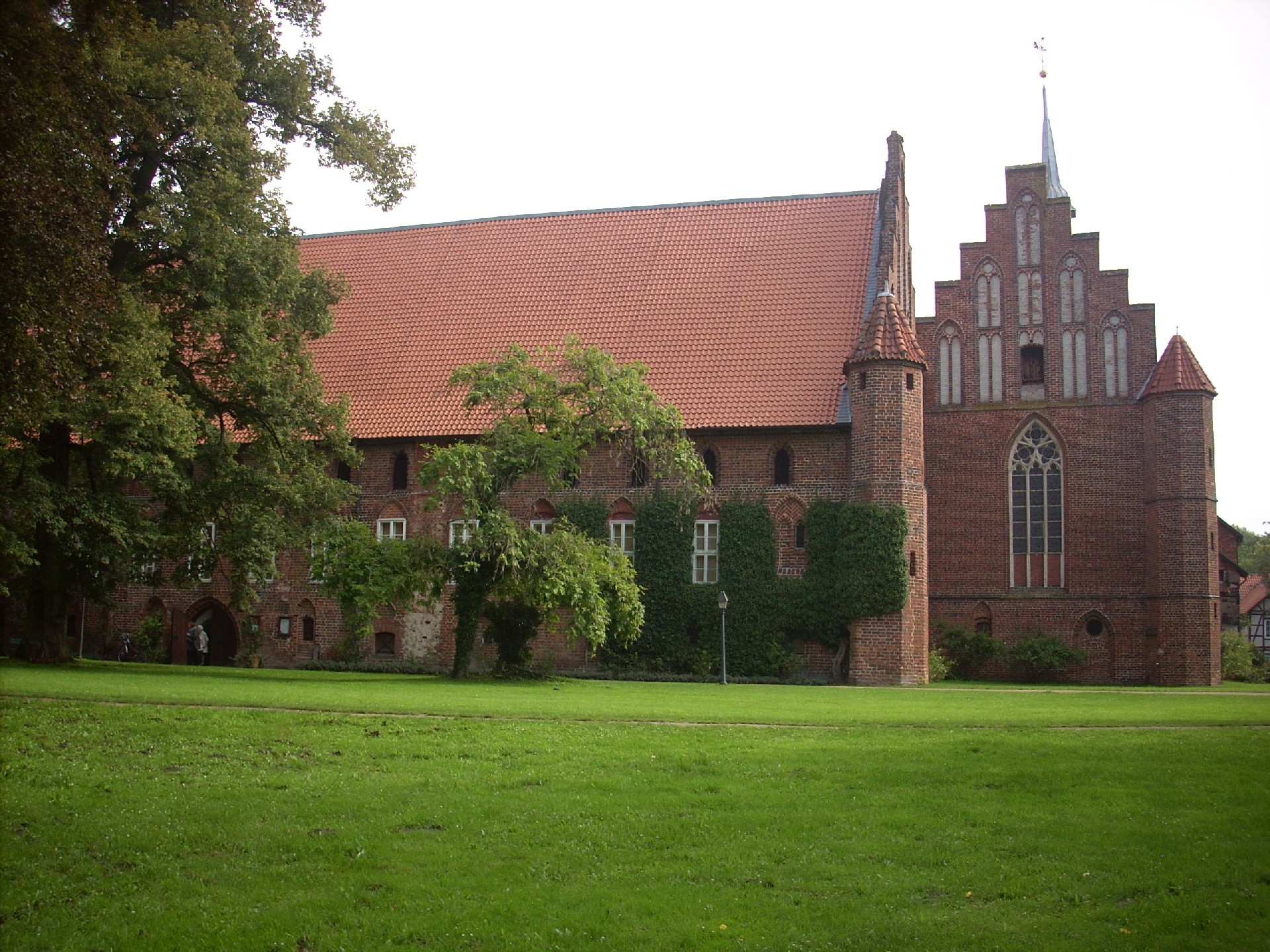

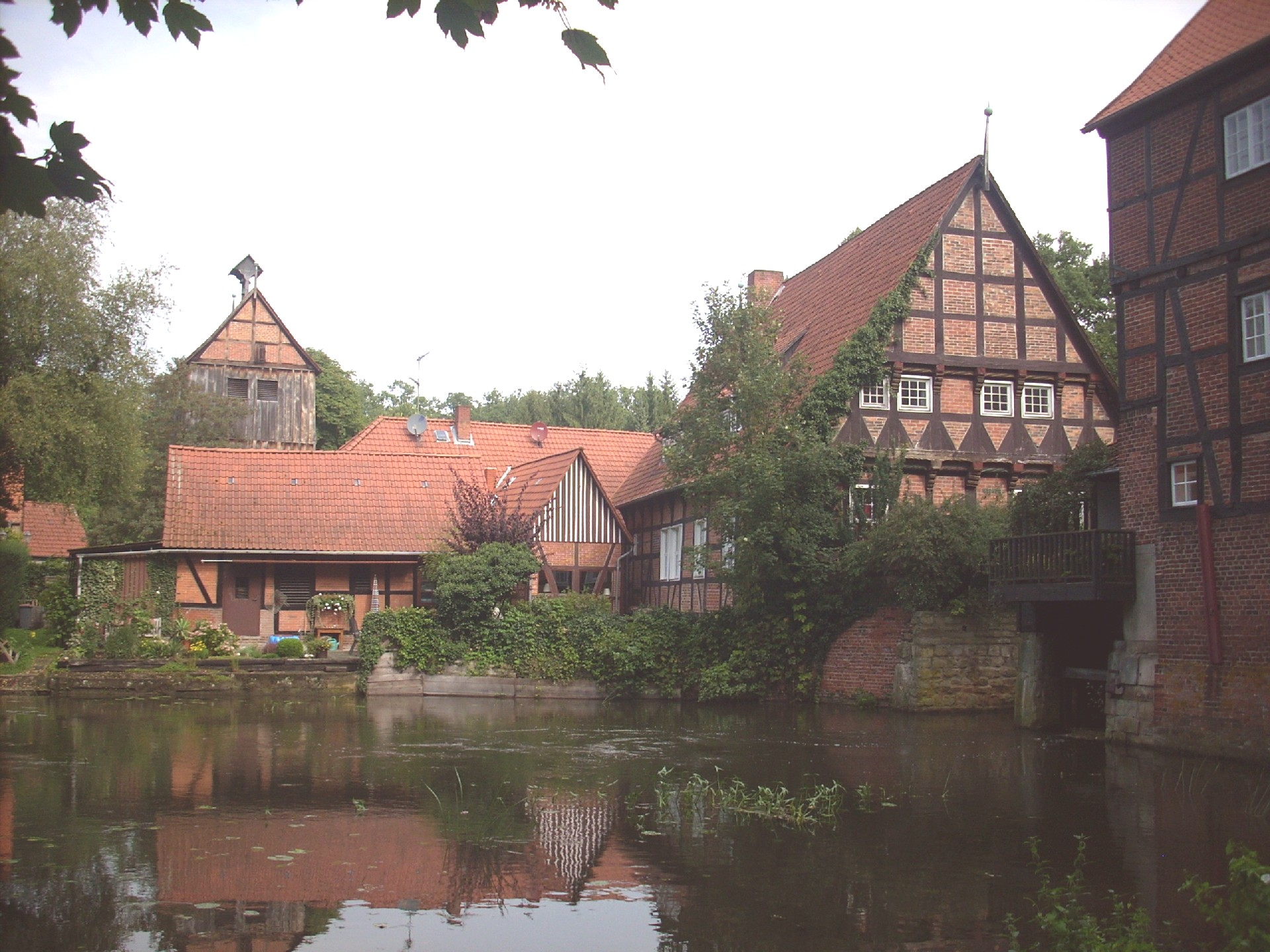

== List of abbesses ==
name	from	until
Eveza	1230	1241
Benigna	1241	1243
Margaretha I	1243	1245
Elisabeth I von Wenden	1245	1270
Elisabeth II	1270	1286
Gerburg	1286	1295
Germod	1295	1301
Margaretha II von Schöningen	1301	1318
Margaretha III Bock	1318	1319
Luthgard I	1319	1325
Margaretha IV	1325	1328
Luthgard II von Braunschweig	1328	1338
Jutta von Braunschweig	1338	1343
Luthgard III von Delmenhorst	1343	1359
Elisabeth III von Braunschweig	1359	1386
Mechthild von Sachsen	1386	1405
Olgard von Marenholz	1405	1422
Katharina von Hoya	1422	1469
Susanna Poltstock	1470	1501
Katharina II von Remstede	1501	1549
Dorothea Spörken	1549	1565
Anna von Langeln	1565	1587
Katharina von Langeln	1587	1609
Christina Havekost	1609	1644
Anna von Hohnhorst	1644	1670
Margaretha Walters	1670	1679
Anna Katharina von Wehlse	1679	1685
Anna Engel Maria von Garmsen	1685	1723
Anna Maria von Honhorst	1723	1755
Maria Anna Christiana von der Wense	1756	1767
Sophia Charlotte von Hohnhorst	1767	1788
Margarete Dorothee von Taube	1788	1793
Marie Veronica von Pufendorf	1793	1816
Margarete Dorothee Luise von Vogt	1816	1820
Justine Frederike Werner	1821	1825
Luise Sophie Juliane Eleonore Ritmeier	1825	1865
Wilhelmine Fischer	1865	1881
Jenny Kern	1881	1920
Marie Deneke	1920	1926
Maria Brandis	1927	1934
Bertha Mühry	1934	1950
Luise Fredrichs	1951	1978
Ruth Eckhardt	1978	1982
Hedwig Thierfelder	1982	1989
Mechtild von Döhren	1990	1998
Renate von Randow	1998	
