= Odon of Poznań =

- Duke of Greater Poland
- Born: 1149
- Died: 20 April 1194 (aged 44–45)
- Buried: Cathedral of Poznań, Poznań
- Noble family: House of Piast
- Spouse: Viacheslava of Halych
- Issue: Władysław Odonic; Ryksa; Euphrosyne
- Father: Mieszko III the Old
- Mother: Elisabeth of Hungary

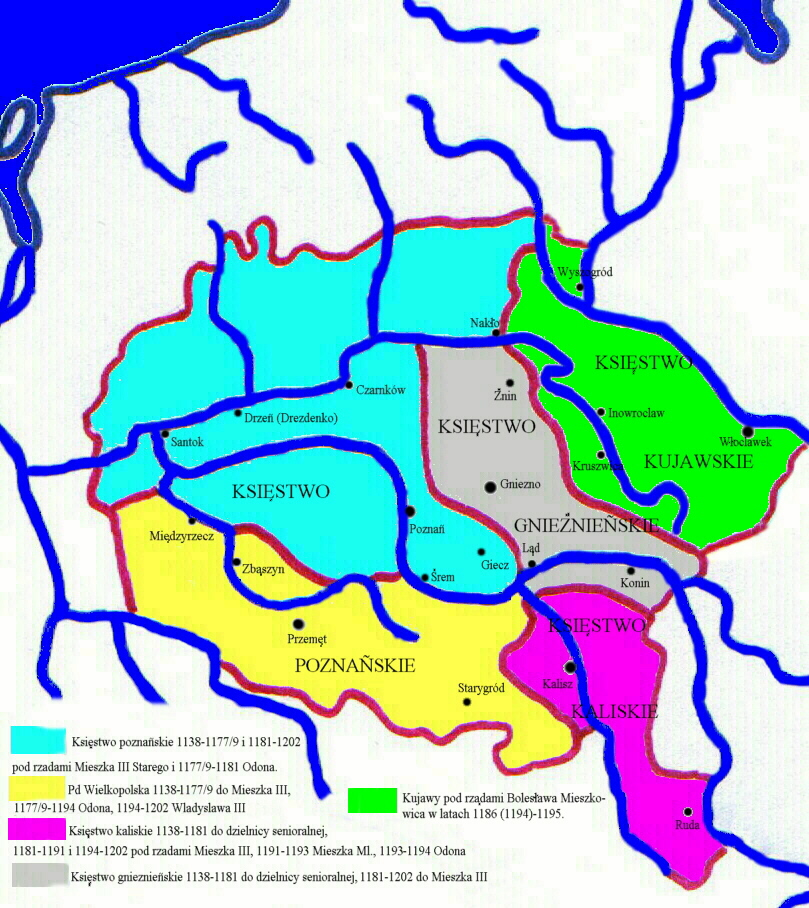
Greater Poland in the era of Mieszko III the Old (1138–1202). Note: Duchy affiliations, borders, and dating remain debated in scholarship

Odon of Poznań, also known as Odon of Greater Poland and Odon Mieszkowic, (Polish: Odon poznański, wielkopolski, Mieszkowic; 1149 – 20 April 1194), was Duke of Greater Poland in 1179 to 1181, and Duke of Kalisz from 1193 until his death. He was the eldest son of Mieszko III the Old, Duke of Greater Poland (and, from 1173, High Duke of Poland), by his first wife, Elisabeth, daughter of King Béla II of Hungary.

== Life ==
Odon's name first appears as a signatory in a document issued on 21 May 1161 at Łęczyca, the site of what is considered the first Polish Sejm.

In 1177, Odon joined the revolt of the Lesser Poland nobility against his father, Mieszko III the Old, in response to the favoritism Mieszko III had shown toward the children of his second marriage. The High Duke had also attempted to force Odon into the priesthood to remove him from the line of succession. In addition to resisting these efforts, Odon sought territorial control and seized the opportunity to claim the Duchy of Greater Poland. He was supported in this endeavor by his uncle, Casimir II the Just. The conflict lasted two years, ending in 1179 with Mieszko III's deposition and exile to Bohemia.

By 1181, Mieszko III the Old had returned to Poland. Enlisting the aid of the Pomeranians, he not only recovered the Duchy of Greater Poland but also reconstituted it, restoring control over the duchies of Gniezno and Kalisz, which had been lost during the earlier rebellion. In 1191, he divided his realm: Odon retained the Duchy of Poznań, his younger half-brother Mieszko the Younger received the Duchy of Kalisz, and Mieszko III kept the Duchy of Gniezno, which he had recovered from Casimir II the Just a decade earlier. Although Gniezno was the traditional and ecclesiastical capital of the Duchy of Greater Poland, Poznań increasingly served as its political and administrative center. Some historians once believed that Mieszko III remained in Gniezno until his death, though his rule more often centered around Poznań.

When Mieszko the Younger died on 2 August 1193, Odon acquired the Duchy of Kalisz with his father's approval.

Little is known about Odon's rule over Kalisz, apart from the fact that he founded a mint. Coins recovered from this period bear the inscription "Odon Dux" ("Duke Odon"), suggesting a notable degree of autonomy.

Odon died on 20 April 1194 and was buried in the Cathedral of Poznań.

== Marriage and issue ==
Around 1184, Odon married Wyszesława (d. after 1200), daughter of Yaroslav Vladimirovich "Osmomysl", Prince of Halych. They had three children:

1. Władysław Odonic (c. 1190 – 5 June 1239)
2. Ryksa (c. 1191 – 18 November aft. 1238)
3. Euphrosyne (c. 1192/94 – 23 August 1235); married c. 1225 to Swantopolk II, Duke of Pomerania.

Since Odon's son Władysław was too young to reign, Odon bestowed the regency of his duchy in the south of Greater Poland upon his half-brother, Władysław III Spindleshanks, while Mieszko III reclaimed the Duchy of Kalisz.

== See also ==
- Dukes of Greater Poland

Odon of Poznań Piast Dynasty Born: c. 1149 Died: 20 April 1194
Preceded by Mieszko III the Old	Duke of Greater Poland; 1177–1182	Succeeded by Mieszko III the Old
Preceded by Mieszko III the Old	Duke of Poznań; 1177–1182	Succeeded by Mieszko III the Old
Preceded by Mieszko the Younger	Duke of Kalisz; 1193–1194	Succeeded by Mieszko III the Old
