= Adela of Meissen =

Queen of Denmark from 1152 to 1157

Queen consort of Denmark
- Tenure: 1152–1157
- Died: 23 October 1181
- Spouse: Sweyn III of Denmark; Adalbert III, Count of Ballenstedt
- House: Wettin
- Father: Conrad, Margrave of Meissen
- Mother: Luitgard of Ravenstein

Adela of Meissen (also Adelheid or Adele) (died 23 October 1181) was a Danish Queen consort, spouse of King Sweyn III of Denmark.

== Life ==
Adela was born in Meissen, northwest of Dresden. She was the second-youngest daughter of Conrad, Margrave of Meissen and Luitgard of Ravenstein. Her siblings included Otto II, Margrave of Meissen; Theodoric I, Margrave of Lusatia; Dedi III, Margrave of Lusatia and Agnes II, Princess-Abbess of Quedlinburg.

Adela was married to Sweyn III of Denmark in 1152. As queen of Denmark, Adela was not popular and was criticized for influencing her spouse to abandon Danish customs in favour of German ones.

Widowed in 1157, she remarried to count Adalbert III of Ballenstedt.

== Issue ==
Issue with Swein

- Son, died early
- Luccardis, spouse of Margrave Berthold I of Istria.

Issue with Adalbert

- Gertrudis, spouse of Walther of Arnstein

== Sources ==
- Alf Henrikson: Dansk historia (Danish history) (1989) (Swedish)
- Sven Rosborn (In Swedish): När hände vad i Nordens historia (1997)

Adela of Meissen House of Wettin Born: ? Died: 23 October 1181
Preceded by Lutgard of Salzwedel	Queen consort of Denmark; 1152–1157	Succeeded by Helena of Sweden
