= Dobroniega Ludgarda of Poland =

12th-century Polish princess

- Born: before 1136
- Died: around 1160 or later
- Family: house of Piast
- Spouse: Theodoric I, Margrave of Lusatia
- Issue: Conrad, Gertruda
- Father: Bolesław III Wrymouth
- Mother: Salomea of Berg

Dobroniega Ludgarda of Poland (b. before 1136, d. around 1160 or later) was a Polish princess, Margravine of Lusatia by marriage to Theodoric I, Margrave of Lusatia.

She was the daughter of Bolesław III Wrymouth, Duke of Poland, and Salomea of Berg, daughter of Henry, Count of Berg, and as such a member of the House of Piast. Around 1147 (according to older historiography around 1142) she married Theodoric, second surviving son of Conrad, Margrave of Meissen and Lusatia. After bearing two children she was abandoned by her husband.

== Early life ==
Dobroniega Ludgarda is named by Chronicon Montis Sereni and Genealogia Wettinensis as a sister of Mieszko III the Old. As Mieszko III was the son of Bolesław III Wrymouth, Duke of Poland, by his second wife Salomea, historians considered that Dobroniega Ludgarda had the same parents. Due to chronology it is impossible for Dobroniega to be a daughter of Bolesław III from his first marriage with Zbyslava of Kiev.

She was named Dobroniega after her paternal great-grandmother, Maria Dobroniega of Kiev. Dobroniega probably took on her second name Ludgarda after marriage with Theodoric, son of margrave of Meissen and Lusatia, whose mother was Luitgard (Ludgarda). This hypothesis, formulated by Karol Maleczyński, is widely accepted by historians.

No sources mentioned her date of birth. She was one of younger children of Bolesław III and Salomea.

According to Karol Maleczyński she was born no later than in 1129 as the tenth child of Bolesław III and Salomea. Historian Kazimierz Jasiński considered that Dobroniega was born probably between 1128 and 1135 as she was probably younger than her husband who was born no earlier than in 1130 and she was married around 1147.

There is also a possibility that Dobroniega was the daughter of Bolesław III who was engaged with Konrad von Plötzkau, Margrave of the Nordmark. If this identification was true, Dobroniega was born before 1127. However, historian Oswald Balzer rejected this possibility, and Kazimierz Jasiński considered that could not be taken seriously, because in this case we would fall in a bunch of untestable guesses.

== Marriage ==
Few years after the death of Bolesław III in 1138 his sons started fighting against each other: on the one side was Władysław II the Exile, the son from the first marriage, on the other were Bolesław IV the Curly and Mieszko the Old, sons from the second marriage. As Władysław was the brother-in-law of Conrad III, a king of Germany, his younger brothers were looking for allies in the Holy Roman Empire. One of them was Conrad, Margrave of Meissen and Lusatia. Younger sons of Bolesław III strengthened the agreement by marrying their sister Dobroniega to Theodoric (Dietrich, Dytryk), son of Conrad.

The date of the marriage is unknown. According to older historians it was around 1142. Kazimierz Jasiński considered that Bolesław IV and Mieszko III were looking for an ally related to Conrad only from 1146. This ally was mentioned first time in sources in the summer of 1146 when Conrad and Albert the Bear, duke of Saxony, conducted negotiations between the Polish princes. According to Jasiński, Dobroniega married Theodoric probably around 1147 (between 1146 and 1148). This date is accepted by other historians. On 6 January 1148 Judyta, sister of Dobroniega, married to Otto, son of Albert the Bear.

During her marriage she bore two children: a son, Conrad, and a daughter, Gertruda. Her husband Theodoric became Margrave of Lusatia in 1156.

Theodoric abandoned Dobroniega, but it is unknown when exactly that happened. According to Chronicon Montis Sereni some time afterward Theodoric started a relationship with Cunigunde, the widowed Countess of Plötzkau.

Oswald Balzer argued that Theodoric abandoned Dobroniega after 1144, while Kazimierz Jasiński thought that happened later, probably in 1150s.

== Death and aftermath ==
Dobroniega's date of death remains unknown. She died no earlier than around 1160. Otherwise Theodoric could have married his concubine. There is no information where Dobroniega was buried.

Her son Conrad was killed in a tournament on 17 February 1175, while her daughter Gertruda became a nun in Gerbstedt.
