= Schwennigke =

River in Germany

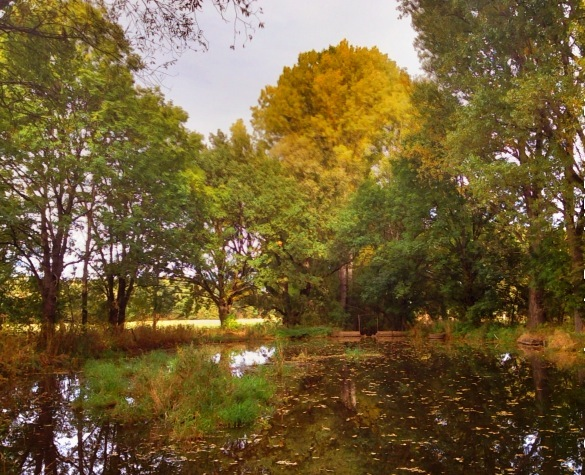
- The Schwennigke near Löbnitz-Bennewitz

Location
- Country: Germany
- State: Saxony

Physical characteristics
- Source
  - location: in Gleinaer Grund and elsewhere (Gleina), additionally external water
- Mouth
  - location: Near Groitzsch into the Schnauder
  - coordinates: 51°10′18″N 12°17′00″E
- Length: 23.4 km (14.5 mi)

Basin features
- Progression: Schnauder→ White Elster→ Saale→ Elbe→ North Sea
- Landmarks: Small towns: Groitzsch; Villages: Gemeinde Elsteraue, Tröglitz, Gleina
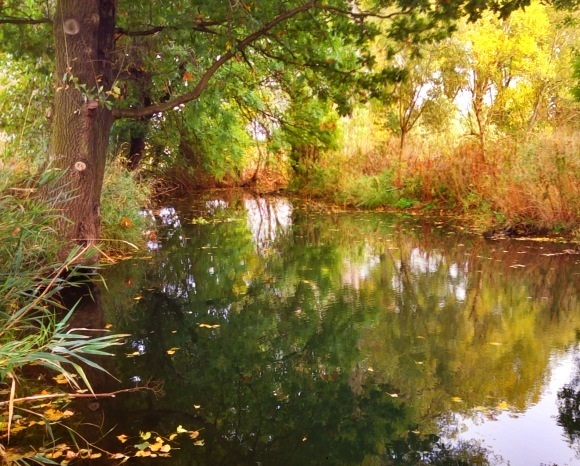
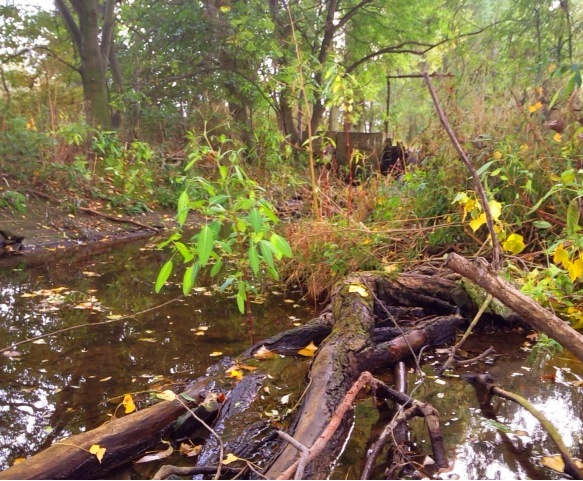

The Schwennigke, also Schwenke, is a river in Saxony, Germany, and a left-hand tributary of the Schnauder. It rises in the Gleinaer Grund and runs from Tröglitz for a distance of about 25 kilometres (16 mi) through the Elster water meadows parallel to the White Elster, before emptying into the Schnauder at Audigast near Groitzsch.

== See also ==
- List of rivers of Saxony
