= Dedi III of Lusatia =

Margrave of Landsberg and Lower Lusatia

Dedi III
- Margrave of Lusatia
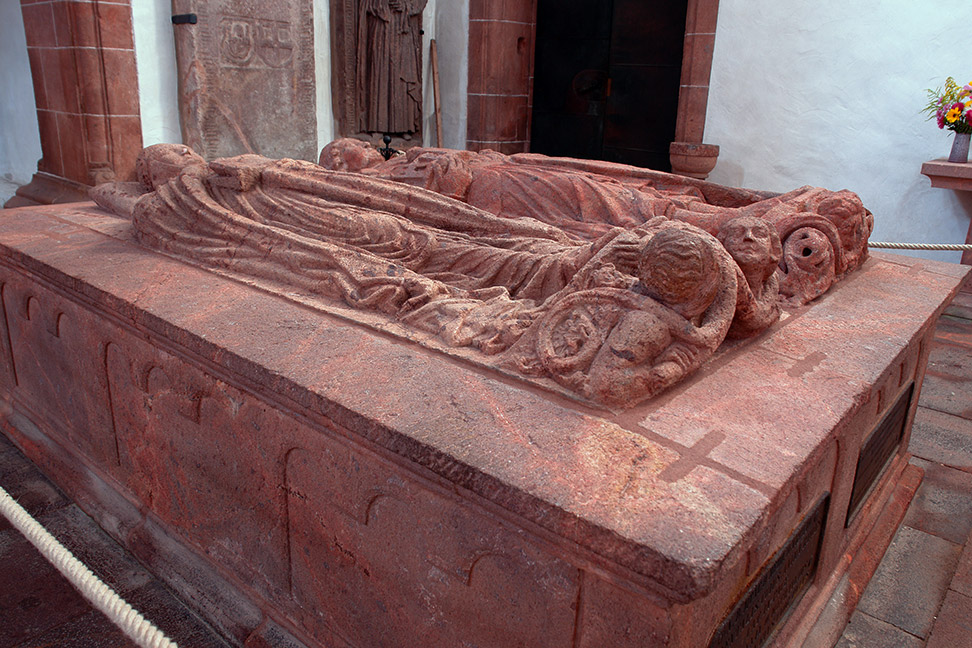
- Tomb of Dedi, with his wife Matilda next to him, on the left
- Reign: 1185–1190
- Predecessor: Theodoric I
- Successor: Conrad II
- Born: c. 1130
- Died: 16 August 1190
- Buried: Wechselburg Priory
- Noble family: House of Wettin
- Spouse: Matilda of Heinsberg
- Issue Detail: Conrad II; Agnes
- Father: Conrad I, Margrave of Meissen
- Mother: Luitgard of Elchingen Ravenstein

Dedi III (German: Dedo), nicknamed the Fat (c. 1130 – 16 August 1190), a member of the House of Wettin, was Margrave of Lusatia from 1185 until his death.

== Life ==
Dedi was a younger son of the Wettin margrave Conrad I of Meissen and his wife Luitgard of Ravenstein. From 1144, he administered the lordship of Groitzsch as heir apparent of the late Count Henry of Groitzsch (d. 1135), and also as an adopted son of his aunt Bertha (d. 1143), Henry's sister and Groitzsch heiress. When Margrave Conrad retired in 1156, the extended Wettin estates were divided and Dedi formally received the County of Groitzsch and the Lordship of Rochlitz, with jurisdiction over the Bishopric of Naumburg.

Dedi participated in five campaigns of the Hohenstaufen emperor Frederick Barbarossa to Italy. In 1177, he served as Frederick's envoy to Pope Alexander III and swore, on Frederick's behalf, to uphold the Treaty of Venice, which ended the schism between pope and emperor.

Back in Germany, Dedi appears to have spent most of his life in Rochlitz. Like his elder brother Margrave Otto II of Meissen, he encouraged the settlement of ethnic Germans in his territory. He founded Wechselburg Priory as a private monastery, where he and his descendants were buried. Together with his elder brothers Margrave Otto II of Meissen and Margrave Theodoric I of Lusatia, he was a loyal supporter of Emperor Frederick in his conflict with the Welf duke Henry the Lion.

When his brother Theodoric I, who also styled himself a "Margrave of Landsberg", died in 1185, Dedi inherited his Lusatian possessions and by appointment of Emperor Frederick succeeded him as margrave. In the succession dispute in Meissen upon the death of Margrave Otto II in 1190, Dedi and his sons sided with their cousin Albert the Proud.

In order to get into shape for participating in the Third Crusade, Dedi had his doctors attempt a liposuction. The operation was botched, and as a result, Dedi died on 16 August 1190.

== Marriage and issue ==
Dedi married Matilda of Heinsberg, and they had:

- Dietrich (before 13 September 1159; – 13 June 1207), Count of Sommerschenburg and Groitzsch and later provost of Magdeburg
- Philip, provost of Xanten (1182-1190)
- Conrad II (after 13 September 1159 – 6 May 1210), Margrave of Lusatia
- Henry (d. 1174)
- Goswin (d. 1174)
- Agnes (c. 1160/1165 – 24/26 March 1195)

== Sources ==
- Lyon, Jonathan R. (2013). Princely Brothers and Sisters: The Sibling Bond in German Politics, 1100-1250. Cornell University Press.
- Heinrich Theodor Flathe (1877). "Dedo" . Allgemeine Deutsche Biographie (in German). Vol. 5. Leipzig: Duncker & Humblot. p. 17.

Dedi III of Lusatia House of Wettin Born: c. 1130 Died: 16 August 1190
Preceded by Theodoric I	Margrave of Lusatia; 1185-1190	Succeeded by Conrad II
