= Adalbert III of Ballenstedt =

Count of Aschersleben (1136–1171)

Adalbert (c. 1136 – 1171) was Count of Aschersleben from 1155 to 1171. He belonged to the House of Ascania.

== Life ==
Adalbert was the fifth son of Margrave Albert the Bear of Brandenburg and his wife Sophie. His siblings included Otto, Margrave of Brandenburg, and Siegfried, Bishop of Brandenburg. Adalbert was first mentioned in 1147 as a witness to an official document of the Archbishop of Magdeburg, along with his father and several of his brothers. In 1155 the County of Aschersleben was transferred to Adalbert by his father, followed by the Vogtei of Nienburg in 1158. In 1157 Adalbert married Adelheid, daughter of Margrave Conrad of Meissen, after the death of her first husband, King Sweyn III of Denmark. Adalbert visited Emperor Frederick Barbarossa at Lodi in Italy several times between the end of 1161 and the autumn of 1162. He died in 1171. The County of Achersleben was inherited by his brother Bernhard.
