= War for Brest (1182–1183) =

- Part of wars between Piast Poland and Kievan Rus'
Date	1182 – 1183
Location	Belz, Halych, Kievan Rus
Result	Polish victory
Territorial changes	Podlachia is annexed by Poland, temporary occupation of Belz and Halych by Polish forces

Belligerents
Kingdom of Poland	Kievan Rus; Belz; Halych; Yotvingians

Commanders and leaders
Casimir II the Just; Mikołaj Gryfita	Vsevolod Mstislavich; Vladimir II Yaroslavich

Strength
Unknown	Unknown

The War for Brestor Brest expedition was Prince Casimir II the Just's military campaign against Kievan Rus following the fall of Brest. Casimir quickly captured the city and made efforts to restore Prince Mstislav to the throne of Halych. Despite initial reluctance from some Polish lords, Casimir led his forces into battle against opposing Rus princes. The engagement culminated in a decisive victory for Casimir, resulting in the surrender of Ruthenians and the restoration of Mstislav to the throne.

== Background ==
The news of a rebellion and the fall of the city of Brest and the land located on the Bug River immediately motivated Prince Casimir to take up arms.

== War ==
=== Siege of Belz ===
Having gathered together both mounted and foot troops, he arrived as soon as possible at Brest, besieging it and within twelve days capturing and occupying it. After sentencing the perpetrators of the breakaway to be beheaded, he build a fortress there towering over the city and, having placed a strong garrison in it to keep the people in obedience.

He led an army toward the city and the area around Halych to restore to the throne his affinity prince Mstislav, whom his brothers had banished from the kingdom under the false pretense that he was not righteous, but a tosser and born of an illicit marriage. To many Polish lords, this expedition seemed burdensome. They were reluctant to go on it. In confidential secret conversations, they accused Prince Casimir that they had enough of their own wars undertook to fight other people's wars, unjust, promising success and benefits. that it was too unworthy of them to fight a dangerous war away from home, without pay, in defense of a bastard and a man of uncertain origin.

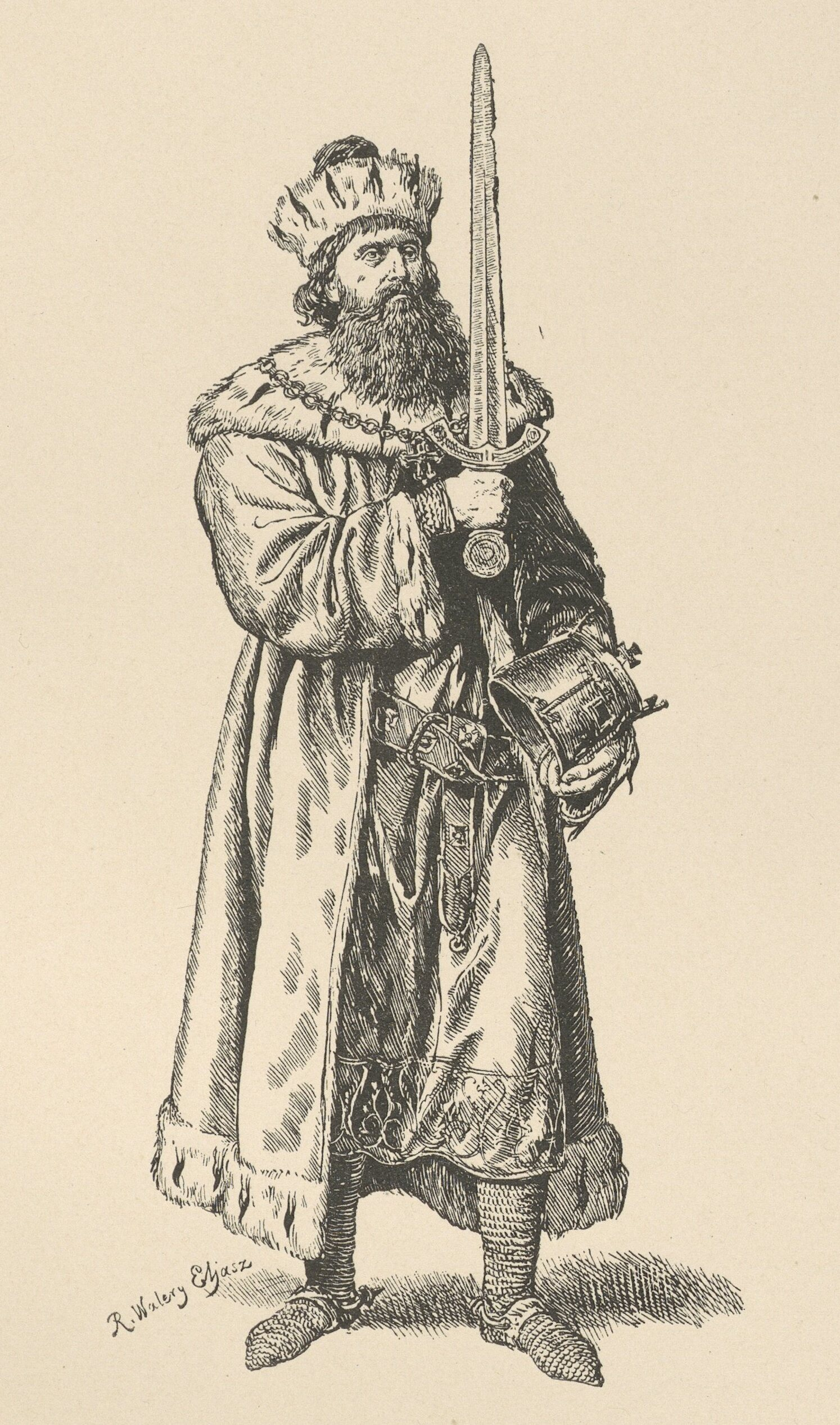
Casimir II the Just

Although Casimir knew that the knights in the camp constantly raised these complaints, but not caring about the opinion of the army, he marched on with him. They had already arrived at Halych and prepared the next day, laying siege to the Halychans, when suddenly scouts reported that Prince of Belz Vsevolod Mstislavich and Mstislav's brother, Prince Vladimir II Yaroslavich, with all the Rus princes and boyars were coming in battle array.

Then the Poles no longer secretly but openly reproach their prince Casimir, and hurl insults at the palatine and governor of Cracow Mikołaj, as the proper perpetrator of this war. They complain that they were put in clear danger and almost given over to the Ruthenians as prey. For they saw large detachments of the Ruthenian army assembled from all the Ruthenian lands, as if specifically for the doom of the Poles. The Ruthenians were aroused to fight, by the clearly small handful of them and the great multitude of their own troops, as well as by fortune-tellers asking about the outcome of the war, proclaiming that everything would succeed for them and that the Poles would meet a sad end.

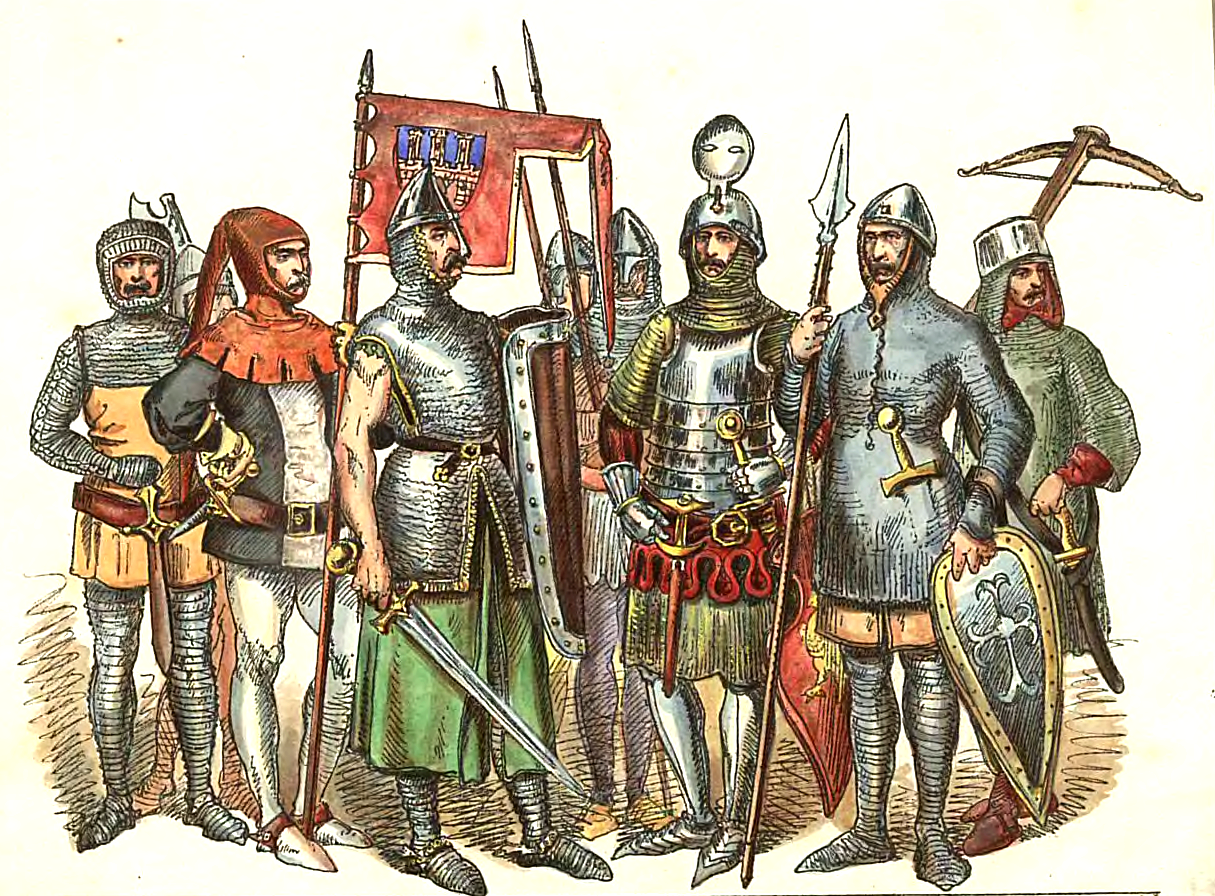
Polish medieval knights

=== Battle of Belz ===
Casimir, not at all frightened by the sight and the great number of enemies, having made the array adds courage to the soldiers by saying that among the great number of Ruthenians are, with few exceptions, miserable slaves, and if they make a little effort, they will easily achieve victory over them, because sometimes a small detachment scattered great hosts. Having thus given spirit to the soldiers and cheered them with the hope of victory, he entrusts the left wing to Mikołaj, the governor of Cracow. He himself directed the right wing and, having ordered the trumpeting of the battle, clashed with the enemies.

The Ruthenians raised a mighty shout and with a fierce attack began the battle. For some time there was a fierce battle between the two nations. Already the left wing, commanded by Voivode Mikołaj, because the light-armed archers pierced or wounded the horses, began to retreat, when Casimir, upon hearing of the danger, brought a detachment of troops to the left wing, driving away the Rus archers the battle anew. And on the right wing the column of Poles, having broken and trampled the Ruthenian array, turned their swords on the remaining Ruthenian troops, while on the left wing the Ruthenians, scattered and beaten by Governor Mikołaj, throw themselves into flight. But even those Ruthenians who fought with the right wing did not hold the square, for, gripped by fear at the sight of those fleeing, they themselves moved to flee. And the princes of Belz and Halych Vsevolod and Vladimir, in order not to get into the hands of Casimir alive, changing horses, escape from the hands of the pursuers. A great number of Ruthenians died in battle or were taken prisoner. A very rich Ruthenian camp on the orders of Casimir was plundered by the Poles.

== Aftermath ==
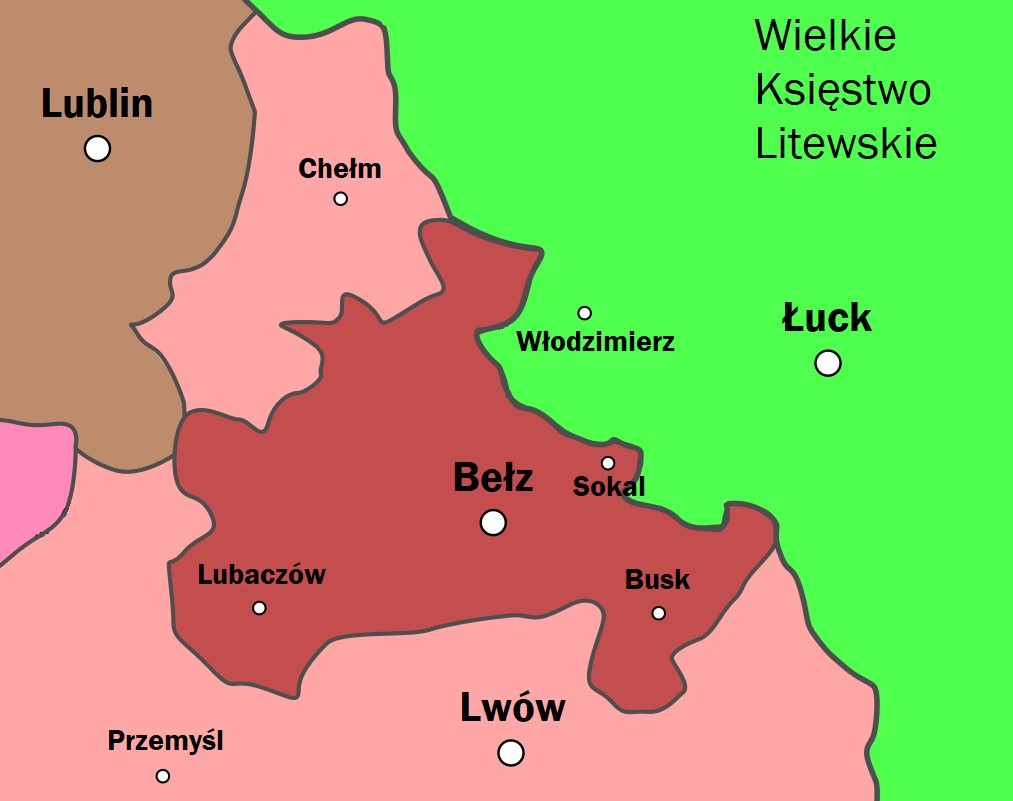
Duchy of Belz

The town and city of Halych also immediately surrendered to the victorious Casimir, who handed it over to his affinity Prince Mstislav. Having induced him beforehand to swear to him that he would never, either in misfortune or good luck, abandon him and the Polish nation, he restored the royal throne in Halych to him and, having put things in order in Rus, returned to Poland. Prince Vsevolod of Belz, who fled the battlefield, arrived with a handful of soldiers at his castle in Belz. The Prince of Halych, Vladimir, headed to Hungary to ask the Hungarian king for help, for military and monetary reinforcements to restore him to the Duchy of Halych. Msitslav's reign did not last long, however, as after a short time he was poisoned. In 1183 Casimir set out again for Brest where he put Roman of Halych on the throne.

== See also ==
- Casimir II the Just
- Vsevolod Mstislavich
- Duchy of Belz
- Polish-Russian Wars

== Sources ==
- Długosz Jan, Roczniki czyli kroniki sławnego królestwa Polskiego vol. 5 ISBN 9788301160708
- Dobosz Józef, Kazimierz II Sprawiedliwy, Poznań 2014 ISBN 9788371777820
- Kadłubek, Wincenty, Kronika Polska ISBN 9788304044692
