= Vsevolod II =

Vsevolod II may refer to:

- Vsevolod II of Kiev (died in 1146)
- Vsevolod Mstislavich of Volhynia (died in 1196)
