= Theodoric I of Lusatia =

Theodoric I
- Margrave of Lusatia
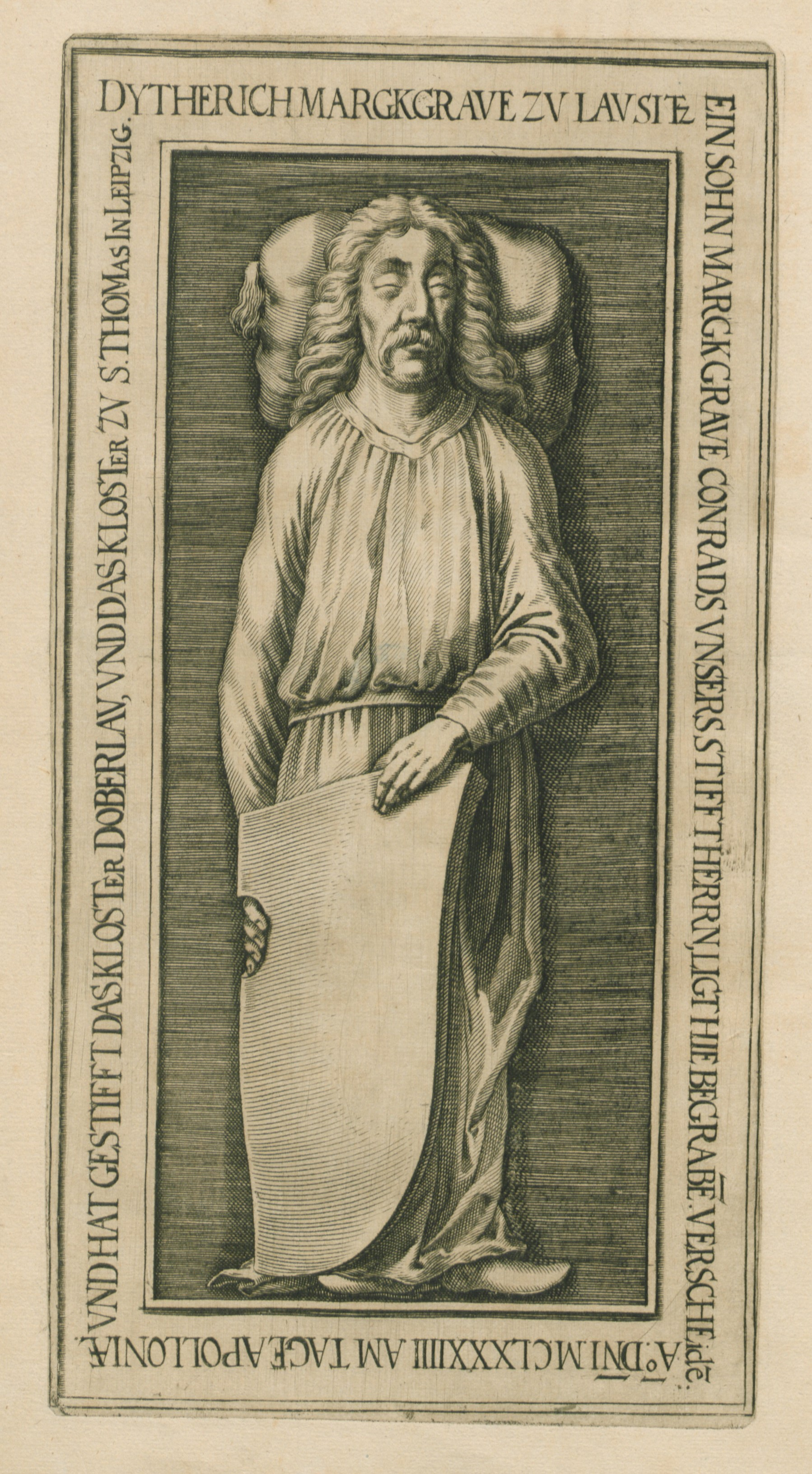
- Reign: 1156–1185
- Predecessor: Conrad, Margrave of Meissen
- Successor: Dedi III
- Born: ca. 1118
- Died: 9 February 1185; Petersberg
- Noble family: House of Wettin
- Spouse: Dobroniega Ludgarda of Poland
- Issue: Conrad; Gertruda
- Father: Conrad, Margrave of Meissen
- Mother: Liutgard of Elchingen-Ravenstein

Theodoric I (German: Dietrich von Landsberg; c. 1130 – 9 February 1185), a member of the House of Wettin, was Margrave of Lusatia from 1156 until his death.

== Life ==
Theoderic was the second surviving son of the Wettin margrave Conrad of Meissen. His older brother Otto was born in 1125. Historians considered that between Otto and Theodoric two daughters of Conrad were born, so Theodoric was born no earlier than in 1128. According to Kazimierz Jasiński, a Polish historian, Theodoric was born probably around 1130.

When his father retired in 1156 and was succeeded by his eldest son Otto II in Meissen, Theoderic received the Lusatian march (Orientalis marchio) formerly held by Henry of Groitzsch, including the castles of Eilenburg and Landsberg, from the hands of the Hohenstaufen emperor Frederick Barbarossa.

He married Dobroniega, daughter of the Polish Duke Bolesław III Wrymouth and his second wife Salomea of Berg. She gave him a son, Conrad, who predeceased him, and a daughter, Gertruda, who became a nun. An illegitimate son Theodoric, by a mistress named Cunigunde, widowed Countess of Plötzkau, was legitimated on 12 May 1203 and became Bishop of Merseburg in 1204.

Though Theodoric at times called himself a "Margrave of Landsberg", a corresponding political entity was not established before 1261 by the Wettin margrave Henry III of Meissen. In 1165, Theodoric with the support of Bishop Werner of Płock founded Dobrilugk Abbey as a family monastery. He remained a firm supporter of Emperor Frederick Barbarossa in the 1157 campaign against High Duke Bolesław IV the Curly of Poland and again accompanied him on his Italian campaign of 1176/77 against the cities of the Lombard League. In the conflict with Henry the Lion, he actively fought the Saxon duke together with Archbishop Wichmann of Magdeburg and his brothers Margrave Otto II and Dedi of Groitzsch.

While staying at the emperor's court at Mainz in 1184, Theodoric fell seriously ill and died the next year. He was buried at Petersberg Abbey, as the construction of the Dobrilugk monastery was still not finished. Emperor Frederick enfeoffed his margraviate to his younger brother Dedi upon his death.

== Sources ==
Theodoric I of Lusatia House of Wettin Born: 1118 Died: 9 February 1185
Preceded by Conrad	Margrave of Lusatia; 1156–1185	Succeeded by Dedi III
