= Pegau Abbey =

Saxon monastery

Coordinates: 51°09′57″N 12°15′12″E

The Abbey of St. James in Pegau was a Benedictine monastery in the town of Pegau in Saxony. It was one of the first monasteries founded in the Duchy of Saxony. It is known above all for the so-called Annales Pegaviensis, the Annals of Pegau from the year 1155, an important description of medieval history.
