= Salomea of Berg =

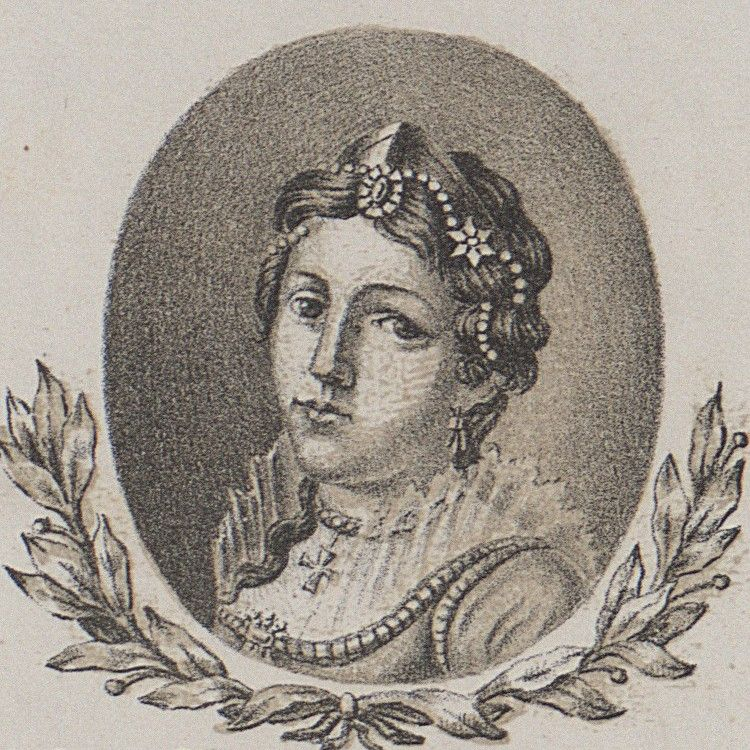
- 19th Century portrait by Teofil Żychowicz, after Michał Stachowicz

High Duchess consort of Poland
- Reign: 1115 – 28 October 1138
- Born: c. 1093/1101; Berg Castle, Ehingen; Holy Roman Empire
- Died: 27 July 1144; Łęczyca; Kingdom of Poland
- Spouse: Bolesław III Wrymouth
- Issue: Richeza; Bolesław IV the Curly; Mieszko III the Old; Henry of Sandomierz; Dobroniega Ludgarda; Judith; Agnes; Casimir II the Just
- House: Piast (by marriage)
- Father: Henry, Count of Berg
- Mother: Adelaide of Mochental

Salomea of Berg (German: Salome von Berg, Polish: Salomea z Bergu; c. 1099/1101 – 27 July 1144) was a noblewoman of Berg and, by marriage with Prince Bolesław III Wrymouth in 1115, High Duchess of Poland until her husband's death in 1138.

== Life ==
Salomea was the daughter of the Swabian count Henry of Berg Castle near Ehingen (not to be confused with the Rhenish County of Berg) by his wife Adelaide of Mochental (d. 1125/27), probably a sister of Margrave Diepold III of Vohburg. According to some sources, her paternal grandmother was Princess Sophia, only daughter of King Solomon of Hungary by his wife Judith of Swabia (by her second marriage stepmother of Salome's husband), but this hypothesis has been rejected by modern historiographers.

The marriage of Salome's sister Richeza with Duke Vladislav I of Bohemia in 1110 had changed the status of the relative obscure Count Henry of Berg in political affairs. Another sister, Sophia, was married to a Moravian member of the Přemyslid dynasty, Duke Otto II the Black of Olomouc, in 1113.

=== Marriage ===
The Polish ruler Bolesław III Wrymouth, after he had begun to expand his domains in the Pomerelian region, decided to normalize his relations with his southern Bohemian neighbors. This took place in 1114 at a great convention on the border river Nysa Kłodzka. Participants included Bolesław III himself, as well as the Bohemian and Moravian Dukes of the Přemyslid line: Vladislav I, Otto II the Black and Vladislav's younger brother Soběslav I. It was decided that the Duke of Poland (a widower since 1112) should secondly marry the Swabian noblewoman Salomea, sister of the Duchesses of Bohemia and Olomouc.

The marriage negotiations, led by Bishop Otto of Bamberg, ended successfully, and between March and July 1115 the wedding of Bolesław III Wrymouth and Salomea of Berg took place. By the end of that year, the new Duchess gave birth to a son named Leszek (d. 1131), the first of the thirteen children who she bore to her husband.

Salomea began to participate actively in the Polish politics on behalf of her children; she feared that according to the primogeniture principle her stepson Władysław II, Bolesław III's first-born son from his marriage with Zbyslava of Kiev, would succeed his father as sole ruler and her sons would be at the mercy of their elder half-brother. In 1125 the powerful Piotr Włostowic was forced to resign his post of a Polish Voivode (Count palatine); the main instigator of this decision was probably Salomea, who replaced him with Wszebor, a man she considered more likely to support herself and her sons against Władysław.

=== Bolesław III's Testament ===
Bolesław III died on 28 October 1138. In his will he had divided the country between his sons according to the principle of agnatic seniority, giving the Seniorate Province of Kraków to his eldest son Władysław II. In addition Salomea received the town of Łęczyca, several castles and towns throughout Poland (including Pajęczno, Małogoszcz, Radziejów, Kwieciszewo) as her dower; this was the first documented case where a Polish ruler left his widow her own piece of land. The terms of the dower stated that the beneficiary could obtain the full sovereignty over the land for her life, and could lose it in two cases: if she remarried or became a nun (abdication would not count). The youngest child of the couple, Casimir II, was not assigned a province; it is speculated that he was born after Bolesław III's death.

=== Later years ===
From her domains in Łęczyca, the now Dowager Duchess continue her intrigues against her stepson High Duke Władysław II. However, the hostilities only began openly in 1141, when Salomea, without the knowledge and consent of the High Duke, commenced to divide Łęczyca between her sons. Also, she tried to resolve the marriage of her youngest daughter Agnes and thus to find a suitable ally for her sons. The most appropriate candidate for a son-in-law had to be Sviatoslav III, the son of Grand Prince Vsevolod II of Kiev. After hearing the news about the events in Łęczyca, Władysław II decided to make a quick response, as a result of which the Grand Prince of Kiev not only broke all his pacts with the Junior Dukes, but also arranged the betrothal of his daughter Zvenislava to Władysław's eldest son Bolesław I the Tall. The wedding took place one year later, in 1142.

Salomea died at her mansion in Łęczyca on 27 July 1144. In accordance with the will of Boleslaw III, her province of Łęczyca reverted to the Senoriate. Unexpectedly, her bitter enemy Piotr Włostowic allied with her sons against High Duke Władysław II, who, after having captured and blinded Włostowic in 1145, was defeated and deposed by his half-brothers. Salomea's oldest surviving son, Bolesław IV the Curly became the new High Duke of Poland in 1146.

== Children ==
- Leszek (1115–1131)
- Richeza (1116–1156), married firstly the Danish prince Magnus Nielsen in 1128, secondly Prince Volodar of Minsk in 1136, and thirdly King Sverker I of Sweden in 1148.
- Casimir the Older (d. 1131)
- Bolesław IV the Curly (c. 1122–1173), Duke of Masovia from 1138, High Duke of Poland from 1146 until his death;
- Mieszko III the Old (c. 1125–1202), Duke of Greater Poland 1138–1177 and 1182–1202, High Duke of Poland 1173–1177, 1191, 1198–1199 and 1201;
- Gertrude (1126/35–1160), nun at Zwiefalten Abbey;
- Henry (1127/32–1166), Duke of Sandomierz from 1138;
- Dobroniega Ludgarda (before 1136–around 1160 or later), married Margrave Dietrich I of Lusatia around 1147;
- Judith of Poland (1130/36–1171/75), married Margrave Otto I of Brandenburg in 1148;
- Agnes (1137–after 1182), married Prince Mstislav II of Kiev in 1151;
- Casimir II the Just (1138–1194), Duke of Sandomierz from 1173, High Duke of Poland from 1177 until his death.

Salomea of Berg House of Piast Born: ca. 1093/1101 Died: 27 July 1144
Royal titles
Preceded by Zbyslava of Kiev	High Duchess consort of Poland; 1115–1138	Succeeded by Agnes of Babenberg
