= Thimo the Brave, Count of Wettin =

11th-century count of Wettin and Brehna

Thimo I
- Count of Wettin
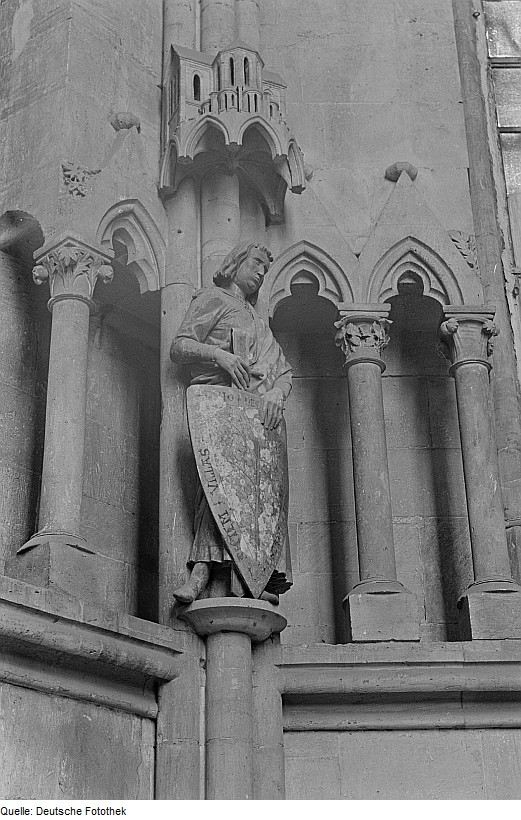
- Deutsche Fotothek image: donor figure of Thimo von Kistritz in the west choir
- Born: c. 1034
- Died: 9 March 1090/1091 or c. 1100
- Buried: Niemegk
- Noble family: Wettin
- Spouse: Ida of Nordheim
- Issue: Dedi IV; Conrad, Margrave of Meissen; Mathilde
- Father: Theodoric II, Margrave of Lower Lusatia
- Mother: Mathilda of Meissen

Thimo the Brave (c. 1034 – 9 March 1090/1091 or c. 1100), also known as Thimo I, Count of Wettin, was a German nobleman and a crucial figure in the early history of the House of Wettin. He inherited the counties of Wettin and Brehna from his father, Theodoric II, Margrave of Lower Lusatia.

== Life ==
Thimo was a younger son of Margrave Theodoric II, Margrave of Lower Lusatia and his wife Mathilda, a daughter of Margrave Eckard I of Meissen. When his father was killed in 1034, Thimo succeeded him in his Wettin and Brehna home territories. He also served as Vogt (bailiff) of the Naumburg diocese and of the Wettin family monastery in Gerbstedt.

In the Saxon revolt of 1073–1075, Thimo fought against King Henry IV and also quarreled with his brother Bishop Frederick of Münster. Later he again approached the king and in 1088 attended the Hoftag diet in Quedlinburg, where the Brunonid margrave Egbert II of Meissen was deposed.

The exact year of Thimo's death is unclear; since his son Conrad was born in approximately 1098, Thimo cannot have died long before this year. Alternatively, some researchers assume that Thimo was in fact Conrad's grandfather and that Conrad's father was an unknown son of Thimo's with the same name, making a death year of 1090/91 possible, as given in a chronicle. However, since Thimo II is not otherwise attested, this is considered unlikely.

Thimo was buried at the monastery of Niemegk in Saxony-Anhalt, which he had founded.

== Marriage and children ==
Thimo married Ida, daughter of Count Otto of Nordheim. Together they had three children:

- Dedi IV (died 16 December 1124), Count of Wettin, married Berta, daughter of Margrave Wiprecht of Groitzsch, died without male heirs
- Conrad, Margrave of Meissen (c. 1097–1157)
- Mathilde, married Count Gero I of Seeburg in 1115, and secondly Count Louis of Wippra in 1123
