= Wiprecht of Groitzsch =

Margrave of Meissen (died 1124)

- Margrave of Meissen
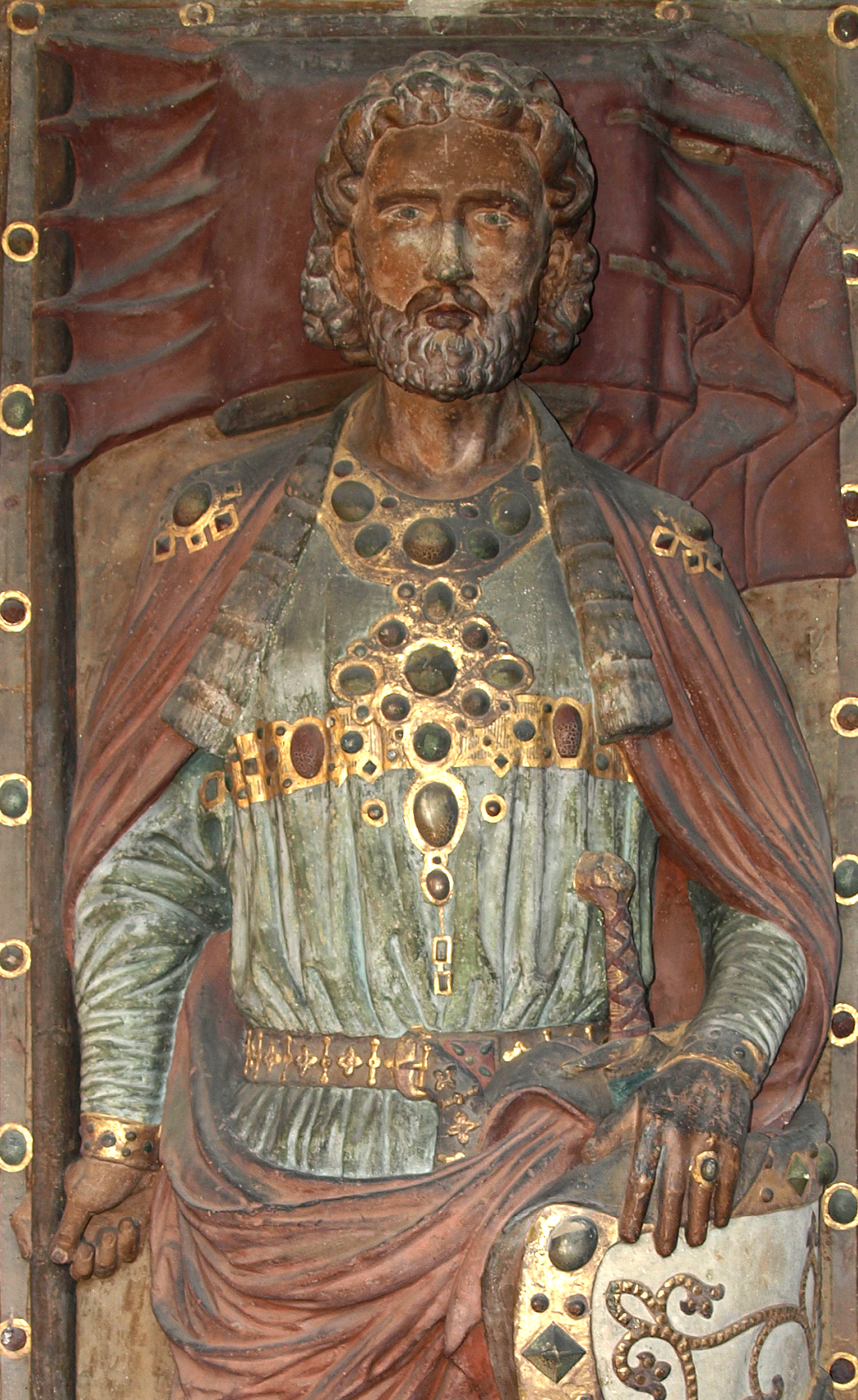
- Tomb effigy of Wiprecht in Pegau, Saxony
- Born: c. 10th century
- Died: May 22, 1124; Pegau
- Spouses: Judith; Cunigunda, heiress of Beichlingen
- Issue: Henry of Groitzsch
- Father: Wiprecht of Balsamgau
- Mother: Sigena of Leinungen

Wiprecht (or Wigbert) of Groitzsch (died 22 May 1124) was the Margrave of Meissen and the Saxon Ostmark from 1123 until his death. A favourite in the court of the Holy Roman Emperor, Henry IV, Wiprecht fought against Rudolf of Rheinfelden and Pope Gregory VII and later joined in a rebellion against the imperial successor, Henry V.

== Life ==
He was born to a noble family of the Altmark, the son of Wiprecht of Balsamgau and Sigena of Leinungen. After his father's death in 1060, he was raised at the court of Lothair Udo II, Margrave of the Nordmark, in Stade.

Lothair Udo granted him the castle of Tangermünde in the Balsamgau as a fief and later transferred him to the castle of Groitzsch in the Osterland, between the Pleisse, the Mulde, and the Elster, from which he took his name. Sometime between 1075 and 1080, he was forcibly exiled from Groitzsch by the regional nobility, who opposed his colonisation movements. He fled to the court of Vratislaus II of Bohemia in Prague. Under Vratislaus he rose to a position of influence at court and, as a favourite of the Emperor Henry IV, he supported Vratislaus for a crown in 1080. In 1085, he married Judith, whose parentage is disputed; she was probably a member of the Přemyslid dynasty. She brought him Budissin, that is, Upper Lusatia around Bautzen, and Nisani, the region around Dresden, as a dowry. Judith gave birth to his first son, Wiprecht, in 1087.

In 1080, he fought with the Emperor against the anti-king Rudolf of Rheinfelden. In 1084, he was with Henry at Rome fighting against Pope Gregory VII. Because he had murdered an enemy in the church of Saint James in Zeitz in 1089, Wiprecht undertook a pilgrimage to Rome and Santiago de Compostela in 1090.

After his sojourn in Bohemia, he returned to the March of Meissen and retook Groitzsch by force of arms. He immediately began settling the region with Germans from Franconia in villages between the Mulde and Wyhra rivers. According to James Westfall Thompson, the "real Germanisation of Meissen begins with Wiprecht von Groitzsch." In 1091 he founded the monastery of Pegau, whose annals, the Annales Pegavienses, are the primary source for his life. He founded another monastery, Lausigk, in 1104. In 1106, he first appears with the title of count and campaigned with the new king Henry V.

In 1108, Judith died. In 1110, he married Cunigunda, heiress of Beichlingen and daughter of Otto I, Margrave of Meissen. It was a double wedding, as his son Wiprecht married Cunigunda's daughter from another marriage, also Cunigunda, at the same time. His marriage with Cunigunda went childless.

In 1109, after the assassination of Duke Svatopluk, Wiprecht the Younger aided Bořivoj II in regaining Prague. When news of this reached Vladislaus, Bořivoj's brother celebrating Christmastide in Plzeň, Vladislaus marched on Prague and defeated Wiprecht outside the city walls on 24 December 1109. He called on the Emperor to come and settle matters and compensate him with 500 marks of silver for the expense of having to take up his ducal rights by force. The Emperor arrived from Bamberg and arrested Wiprecht. Wiprecht the Elder had to give up his first wife's dowry and his castles of Leisnig and Morungen to the emperor to redeem his son.

After the imperial coronation of Henry V, Wiprecht, Siegfried of Orlamünde, and Louis I of Thuringia joined in rebellion against him (1112). They were defeated by Hoyer of Mansfeld and Wiprecht was captured and imprisoned at Trifels in 1113, only being spared death on the condition that he transfer all his lands to the emperor. He was only released in 1116 in a prisoner exchange for the ministerialis Heinrich Haupt. He seems at that time to have recovered his lost rights. While he was in prison, his son Wiprecht, took part on the side of the Lothair of Supplinburg in the Battle of Welfesholz on 11 February 1115, where Hoyer of Mansfeld had died. Wiprecht the Younger died in 1117.

In 1118, Wiprecht was made the burggrave of Magdeburg. He became the advocate of the monastery of Neuwerk at Halle. In 1123, he was back in imperial favour when Henry V appointed him to succeed Henry II in the marches of Meissen and Lusatia (the Ostmark). Lothair, Duke of Saxony, appointed his own candidates: Albert the Bear in Lusatia and Conrad in Meissen. He was unable to hold his own in two marches against two powerful opponents. He died of burns received during a fire in May of the next year at Pegau, where he was buried in the church he had founded. He was predeceased by his eldest son, Wiprecht, and succeeded by his second son, Henry. He left one daughter, Bertha, who married Dedo IV of Wettin, son of Timo.

== Sources ==
- Leyser, Karl (1968). "The German aristocracy from the ninth to the early twelfth century: a historical and cultural sketch". Past and Present (41): 25–53. doi:10.1093/past/41.1.25.
- Loud, Graham A. (2017). "A political and social revolution: the development of the territorial principalities in Germany". In Loud, Graham A.; Schenk, Jochen (eds.). The Origins of the German Principalities, 1100-1350: Essays by German Historians. Routledge. pp. 3–22. ISBN 978-1-315-55489-1.
- Patze, Hans (1963). "Die Pegauer Annalen, die Königserhebung Wratislaws von Böhmen und die Anfänge der Stadt Pegau". Jahrbuch für die Geschichte Mittel- und Ostdeutschlands. 12: 1–62.
- Thompson, James Westfall (1928). Feudal Germany, Volume II. New York: Frederick Ungar Publishing Co.
- Vogtherr, Thomas (2001). "Wiprecht von Groitzsch und das Jacobspatrozinium des Klosters Pegau". Neues Archiv für sächsische Geschichte. 72: 35–53.

Preceded by Henry II	Margrave of the Saxon Ostmark; 1123–1124	Succeeded by Henry of Groitzsch
Preceded by Henry II	Margrave of Meissen; 1123–1124	Succeeded by Henry of Groitzsch
