= Kitzen =

- Ortsteil of Pegau
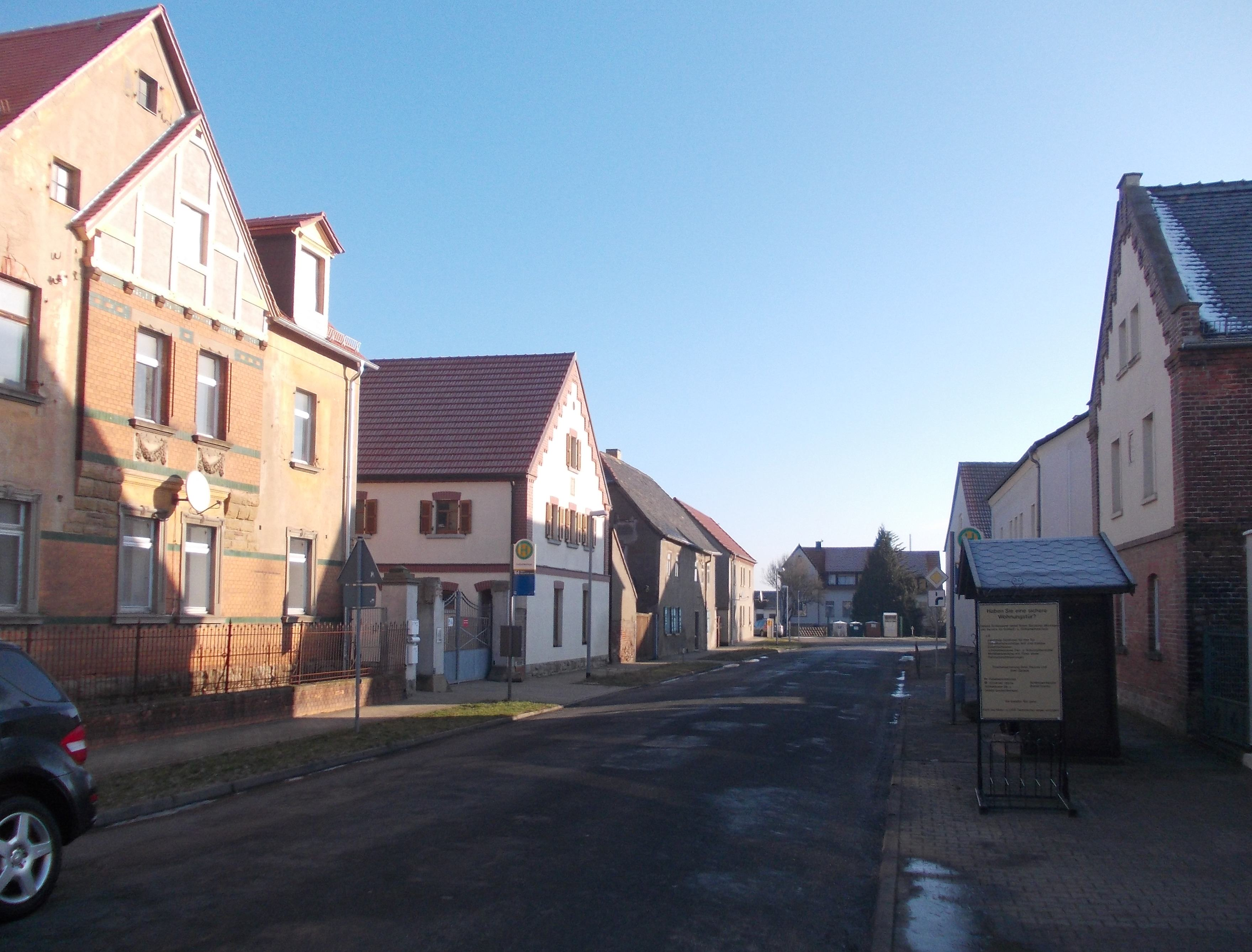

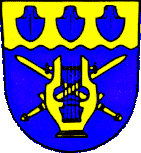
- Coat of arms
- Interactive map of Kitzen
- Location within Germany Location within Saxony
- Coordinates: 51°13′N 12°13′E
- Country: Germany
- State: Saxony
- District: Leipzig
- Town: Pegau
- Subdivisions: 11

Area
  - Total: 26.94 km^{2} (10.40 sq mi)
- Elevation: 120 m (390 ft)

Population (2010-12-31)
  - Total: 1,885
  - Density: 69.97/km^{2} (181.2/sq mi)
- Time zone: UTC+01:00 (CET)
  - Summer (DST): UTC+02:00 (CEST)
- Postal codes: 04460
- Dialling codes: 34203
- Vehicle registration: L
- Website: www.kitzen.com

Kitzen is a former municipality in the Leipzig district, in Saxony, Germany. With effect from 1 January 2012, it has been incorporated into the town of Pegau.

== Geography ==
It is located near Leipzig and includes the following subdivisions:

- Eisdorf
- Großschkorlopp
- Hohenlohe
- Kleinschkorlopp
- Löben
- Peißen
- Scheidens
- Seegel
- Sittel
- Thesau
- Werben
