= Agnes of Poland =

Grand Princess consort of Kiev
- Reign: 1168-after 1182
- Born: c. 1137
- Died: after c. 1182
- Spouse: Mstislav II of Kiev
- Issue: Roman of Novgorod; Sviatoslav of Brest; Vsevolod of Bielsk
- House: Piast
- Father: Bolesław III Wrymouth of Poland
- Mother: Salomea of Berg

Agnes of Poland (Polish: Agnieszka Bolesławówna; b. c. 1137 - d. aft. 1182) was a member of the House of Piast and by marriage princess of Pereyaslavl and Volynia and grand princess of Kiev from 1168.

== Early years ==
Agnes was the penultimate child and youngest daughter of Duke Bolesław Wrymouth of Poland and his second wife, Salomea of Berg. The date of birth is known thanks to Ortlieb, benedictine monk of Zwiefalten who visited the court of Dowager Duchess Salomea in Łęczyca between 1140 and early 1141; in his reports, he mentioned that Agnes was three years old. As in 1138 Salomea gave birth the future Casimir II the Just, Agnes was born a year earlier.

She was probably named after the wife of his half-brother Władysław II, Agnes of Babenberg. It is also possible that she was named after his father's half-sister, the abbess of Gandersheim and Quedlinburg.

In 1141 Salomea of Berg organized a meeting in Łęczyca, where his eldest sons (Bolesław IV and Mieszko III), and the lords had to decide, among other things, the future of Agnes. They had two options: sent her to the Benedictine monastery in Zwiefalten (where her older sister Gertruda was already a nun) or married her with one of the ruling princes of that time. Eventually it was decided the alliance with Kievan Rus', and thus gain an ally against Władysław II. According to the majority of historians, the chosen groom was Prince Mstislav Iziaslavich. This hypothesis is supported by the fact that ten years later he married Agnes. The second view as a candidate for the hand of Agnes was one of the sons of the Grand Prince of Kiev, Vsevolod II Olgovich. Soon after, he reject the proposal of the Junior Dukes and their mother and choose the alliance with Władysław II, reinforced in 1142 when his eldest son Bolesław married with Vsevolod II's daughter Zvenislava.

Władysław II was not invited to the Łęczyca meeting, despite the fact that, as the High Duke, he had the final voice on Agnes' engagement. In retaliation for this omission, in the winter of 1142–1143 he supported Kievan military actions against Salomea and her sons. The first clash between the brothers was a complete success by the High Duke.

== Marriage ==
Probably between the end of 1149 and 1151, Agnes married Prince Mstislav Iziaslavich of Pereyaslavl, the eldest son of Grand Prince Iziaslav II of Kiev. The Chronicler Wincenty Kadłubek, who knew the Piast-Rurikids affinities, explicitly described in his Chronica Poloniae that Agnes was given to Mstislav as a wife. Further confirmation of this fact is that Mstislav's eldest son was called nephew of Casimir II the Just, and the relationship existing between Roman the Great and Leszek the White is described as the second-degree cousins. In addition, Roman is named jątrew (wife's brother) of Leszek in the Hypatian Codex. Therefore, if Mstislav was to marry any of Bolesław III's daughters, the only one he could marry was Agnes.

During her marriage, Agnes bore her husband three sons: Roman the Great, Vsevolod and Vladimir. Mstislav's firstborn son, Sviatoslav, is considered by the majority of historians an illegitimate child.

After Grand Prince Iziaslav II's death, Mstislav lost his Principality of Pereyaslavl (1155) and took refuge with his wife in Poland. However, the following year he was able to return and conquer Lutzk (during 1155–1157) and Volynia (during 1157–1170). In May 1168, after the death of Rostislav Mstislavich, Mstislav became the Grand Prince of Kiev and Agnes the Grand Princess consort.

However, Mstislav II's reign was short-lived: in December 1169 a great coalition of Rurikid princes led by Prince Andrei I Bogolyubsky of Vladimir-Suzdal and his son Mstislav was created against him. Unable to defend Kiev, Mstislav II fled to Volynia, leaving his family at the mercy of his enemies. Two months later (February 1170), Mstislav II was able to recover Kiev thanks to the citizenry, who favored his rule; but in April of that year he was again expelled from Kiev, this time for good. The deposed Grand Prince retired to his domains in Volynia, where he died on 19 August 1170.

== Death and aftermath ==
The last mention of Agnes as a living person comes from the Chronica Poloniae of Wincenty Kadłubek. Sviatoslav, Prince of Brest, was exiled by his half-brothers as a result of the allegations that he was illegitimate. Then Casimir II the Just invaded Brest and restored him in his domains. The Chronicle of the Chapter of Kraków informs about an expedition of Casimir II into Kievan Rus' in 1182.
