= Conrad, Margrave of Meissen =

12th-century Margrave of the House of Wettin

Conrad I
- Margrave of Meissen
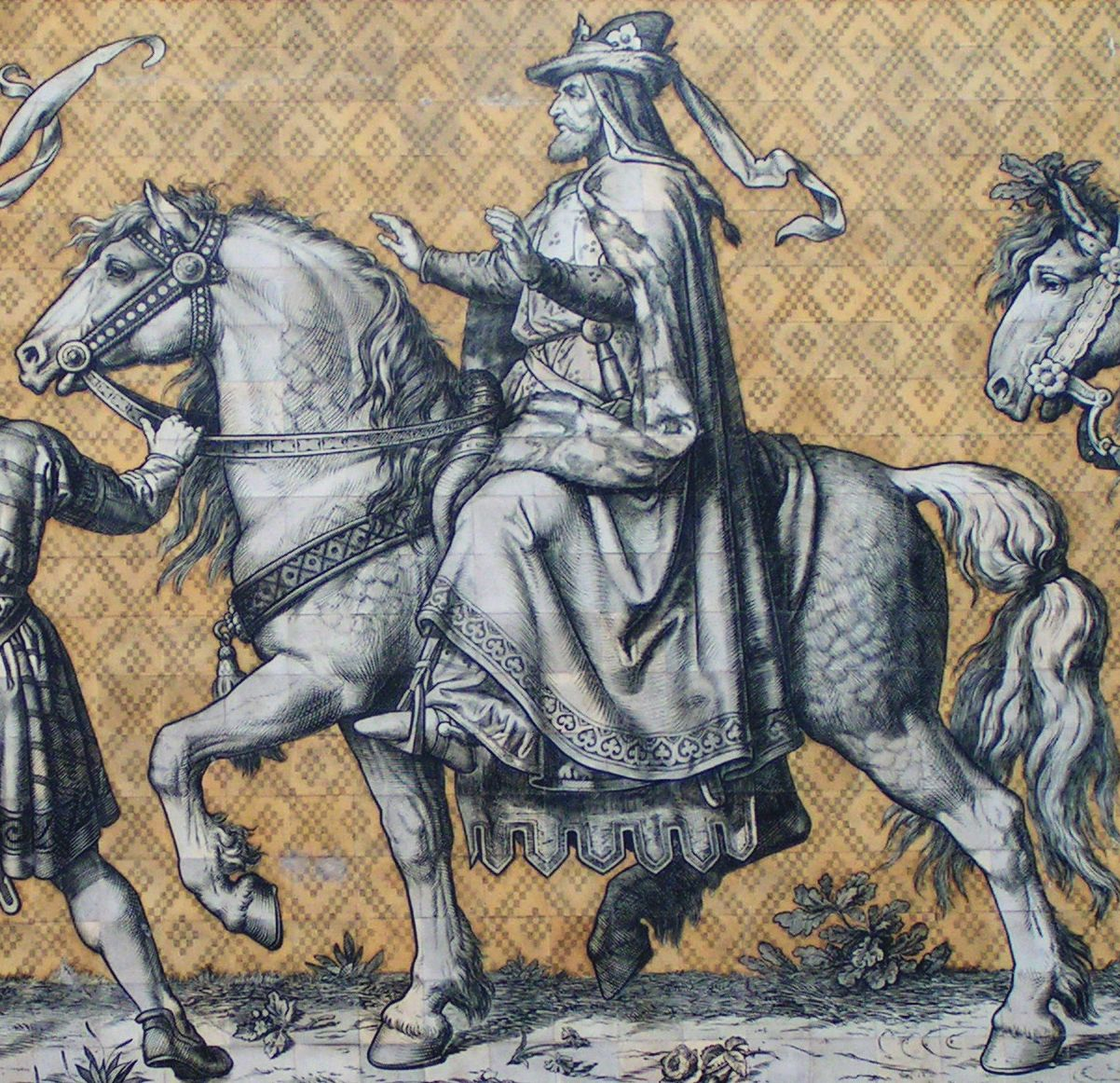
- Conrad the Great, depicted in the Fürstenzug, Dresden
- Reign: 1123–1156
- Predecessor: Wiprecht
- Successor: Otto II
- Born: c. 1097
- Died: 5 February 1157; Petersberg
- Buried: Lauterberg Abbey
- Noble family: Wettin
- Spouse: Luitgard of Elchingen-Ravenstein
- Issue: Otto II, Margrave of Meissen; Theodoric I, Margrave of Lusatia; Dedi III, Margrave of Lusatia; Adela, Queen of Denmark; Agnes II, Princess-Abbess of Quedlinburg
- Father: Thimo of Wettin
- Mother: Ida of Nordheim

Conrad I (c. 1097 – 5 February 1157), called Conrad the Great (German: Konrad der Große), a member of the House of Wettin, was Margrave of Meissen from 1123 and Margrave of Lusatia from 1136 until his retirement in 1156. Initially a Saxon count, he became the ruler of extensive Imperial estates in the Eastern March and the progenitor of the Saxon electors and later kings.

Conrad was a key figure in the German eastward expansion and in the consolidation of Wettin power in the region. He strengthened and expanded his territories, securing his position after overcoming early challenges from Emperor Henry V and Count Wiprecht of Groitzsch. His rule promoted the growth of commercial centres such as Leipzig and saw the foundation of Altzella Abbey, which later became a significant economic asset following the discovery of silver nearby.

== Life ==
Conrad was the son of the Saxon count Thimo of Wettin and his wife Ida, a daughter of Count Otto of Nordheim. Both his father and his maternal grandfather had taken part in the Saxon Rebellion against the Salian king Henry IV. Thimo was the first to style himself Count of Wettin, named after the family’s ancestral seat on the Saale river, while his elder brother Dedi ruled the Saxon March of Lusatia (Eastern March). Dedi’s son Henry the Elder became the first Wettin margrave of Meissen in 1089.

Upon the early death of his father, Conrad succeeded him as Count of Wettin and Brehna. When his cousin Henry the Elder died in 1103, he hoped to be enfeoffed with the Lusatian and Meissen marches by Emperor Henry IV. However, his expectations proved to be false, when Henry's widow Gertrude of Brunswick gave birth to a posthumous son, Henry II. When Henry II attained his majority in 1121, he campaigned against his uncle and had him arrested. Conrad faced an end in prison, but avoided this fate when Henry II died in 1123 at the age of twenty, presumably poisoned.

Now head of the Wettin dynasty, Conrad saw his aspirations fulfilled. He succeeded Henry II as Count of Eilenburg and also claimed Lusatia and Meissen. However, that same year, Emperor Henry V enfeoffed Count Wiprecht of Groitzsch with both marches. Furious Conrad forged an alliance with the Saxon duke Lothair of Supplinburg and with the support of several local nobles expelled Wiprecht. Duke Lothair ignored the Imperial bestowal and appointed Conrad Margrave of Meissen; he also named the Ascanian count Albert the Bear Margrave of Lusatia. As Wiprecht was unable to hold his own against his two opponents, Conrad was securely in power in Meissen by Wiprecht's death in May 1124.

In 1136, upon the death Wiprecht's son Henry of Groitzsch, Lothair, then emperor (as Lothair II), appointed Conrad to Lusatia as well. He also ruled the Milceni lands around Bautzen (later known as Upper Lusatia), which had been re-acquired from Poland and remained a part of Meissen, while the March of Lusatia was reduced to Lower Lusatia alone. Obtaining the status of an Imperial Prince, Margrave Conrad had the Polabian territories colonised by Flemish settlers in the course of the Ostsiedlung migration and laid the foundations for the development of the Wettin dominions in Upper Saxony.

In 1143, Conrad also became Count of Groitzsch and Rochlitz and Vogt (bailiff) in Chemnitz and Naumburg. He eased the tensions with the neighbouring Kingdom of Poland by marrying his son Theodoric to Dobroniega Ludgarda, a daughter of the Polish duke Bolesław III Wrymouth. He also married his eldest son Otto II to Hedwig of Brandenburg, a daughter of Margrave Albert the Bear.

In 1147, while the Hohenstaufen king Conrad III of Germany was on the Second Crusade, Conrad joined the Welf duke Henry the Lion, Albert the Bear, the Archbishops of Magdeburg and Bremen on the Wendish Crusade against the Slavic Obodrites and Wagri tribes. In August, Conrad, Albert, the bishops of Magdeburg, Havelburg, and Brandenburg deployed their forces at Magdeburg. The Dubin and Dimin fortresses of Obodrite prince Niklot were besieged. Both he and Pribislav, another Obodrite prince, were forced to adopt Christianity.

In his later years, Conrad founded the Lauterberg monastery (later Petersberg Abbey) north of Halle, to which he retired after he had officially renounced all secular rights in favour of his son Otto II on 30 November 1156. There he died the following year and was buried next to his wife, Luitgard (Lucarda; d. 1146), daughter of the Swabian count Adalbert of Elchingen-Ravenstein and his wife Bertha of Boll, possibly a daughter of Duke Frederick of Swabia and the Salian princess Agnes of Waiblingen.

== Marriage and issue ==
His wife Luitgard of Elchingen-Ravenstein (c. 1104–1146), whom he had married before 1119, had blessed him with many children. His eldest surviving son, Otto II, succeeded him in Meissen in 1156, while his second surviving son, Theodoric, succeeded in Lusatia. His son Count Henry of Wettin married Sophia of Sommerschenburg, Countess Palatine of Saxony, daughter of Count Frederick VI, Count Palatine of Saxony of Sommerschenburg and Countess Liutgard of Stade, queen dowager of Denmark.

His issue were:

- Henry, died young
- Otto II, Margrave of Meissen (c. 1125–1190)
- Theodoric I, Margrave of Lusatia (Dietrich; c. 1130–1185)
- Dedi III, Margrave of Lusatia (Dedo V of Wettin; c. 1142–1190)
- Henry I, Count of Wettin (d. 1181), married (1) Sophia of Sommerschenburg (d. 1189 or 1190), daughter of Count Frederick VI, Count Palatine of Saxony of Sommerschenburg, Count Palatine of Saxony and his wife Countess Liutgard of Stade (later queen of Denmark).
- Frederick I of Brehna (c. 1126–1182)
- Gertrud (d. c. 1191), married Count Gunther II of Schwarzburg
- Oda (d. c. 1190), Abbess of Gerbstedt
- Adela of Meissen (d. 1181), married King Sweyn III of Denmark (d. 1157), secondly married to Count Adalbert of Ballenstedt (d. 1171)
- Bertha, Abbess of Gerbstedt
- Sophia (d. 1190), married Count Gebhard I of Burghausen
- Agnes II, Princess-Abbess of Quedlinburg (d. 1203)

== Bibliography ==
- Lyon, Jonathan R. (2013). Princely Brothers and Sisters: The Sibling Bond in German Politics, 1100-1250. Cornell University Press.
- Thompson, James Westfall: Feudal Germany, Volume II. New York: Frederick Ungar Publishing Co., 1928.
- Janos Stekovics: Landesheimatbund Sachsen-Anhalt e.V. Halle (Saale): Konrad von Wettin und seine Zeit. Protocol of the conference on the 900th birthday of Conrad of Wettin at the Burggymnasium Wettin, 18/19th July 1998. ISBN 3-932863-36-4.
- Lobeck, Immanuel L. O.: Markgraf Konrad von Meissen. Leipzig 1878, (Leipzig, Universität, Dissertation, 1878; Digitalisat).
- Manfred Orlick: Stammvater des sächsischen Königshauses. in Wahre Geschichten um die Straße der Romanik, p. 42–52, 2016, ISBN 978-3-89772-276-7.
- Gerlinde Schlenker, Axel Voigt: Konrad I, Markgraf von Meißen und der sächsischen Ostmark. 2007, ISBN 978-3-89812-494-2.

Conrad the Great House of Wettin Born: c. 1097 Died: 5 February 1157
Preceded by Wiprecht of Groitzsch	Margrave of Meissen; 1123–1156	Succeeded by Otto
Preceded by Henry of Groitzsch	Margrave of Lusatia; 1136–1156	Succeeded by Dietrich I
