= Agnes II, Abbess of Quedlinburg =

German artist (1139–1203)

Agnes II
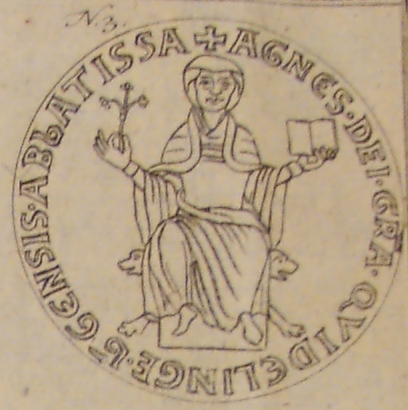
- Agnes II's seal

Princess-Abbess of Quedlinburg
- Reign: 1184–1203
- Predecessor: Adelaide III
- Successor: Sophia
- Born: 1139; Meissen
- Died: 21 January 1203 (aged 63–64); Quedlinburg Abbey
- Father: Conrad, Margrave of Meissen
- Mother: Luitgard of Swabia
- Religion: Roman Catholic

Agnes II (Agnes of Meissen; 1139 – 21 January 1203) was a member of the House of Wettin who reigned as Princess-Abbess of Quedlinburg.

== Life ==
She was born in Meissen as the daughter of Conrad, Margrave of Meissen, and Luitgard of Swabia. In 1184, she was elected successor to Princess-Abbess Adelaide III.

Agnes was a significant patron of art, as well as miniaturist and engraver. During her reign, the nuns of Quedlinburg Abbey made large curtains that are indispensable in the study of the art industry of the era. She also wrote and illuminated books for divine service. However, her greatest masterpiece was the manufacture of wall-hangings, of which one set was intended to be sent to the Pope; this tapestry is the best preserved piece of Romanesque textile. She was known for combining her embroidering with her literary composition and even composed Latin verses on a piece of tapestry.

She died in Quedlinburg Abbey on 21 January 1203.

== Legacy ==
Agnes is a featured figure on Judy Chicago's installation piece The Dinner Party, being represented as one of the 999 names on the Heritage Floor.

Regnal titles
Preceded by Adelaide III	Princess-Abbess of Quedlinburg; 1184–1203	Succeeded by Sophia
