= Zbyslava of Kiev =

Kievan Rus' princess and Duchess of Poland (c. 1085/90–c. 1114)

Duchess consort of Poland
- Reign: 1102–1114
- Born: c. 1085/90
- Died: c. 1114
- Spouse: Bolesław III Wrymouth
- Issue: Władysław II the Exile; Judith, Princess of Murom
- Dynasty: Rurik
- Father: Sviatopolk II of Kiev
- Mother: Premyslid princess

Zbyslava of Kiev (Note: Polish: Zbysława kijowska; Russian: Сбыслава Святополковна; Ukrainian: Збислава Святополківна.) (c. 1085/90 – c. 1114) was a princess of Kievan Rus', member of the Rurik dynasty, and by marriage the duchess of Poland. She was the daughter of Sviatopolk II, Grand Prince of Kiev, by his first wife, whom according to some historians was a Premyslid princess.

== Life ==
During his fight against his half-brother Zbigniew, the Junior Duke of Poland, Bolesław III Wrymouth, allied himself with Kievan Rus' and Hungary. In order to seal his alliance with the Grand Prince of Kiev, Bolesław III was betrothed to his eldest daughter Zbyslava. The Primary Chronicle names Zbyslava, daughter of Svyatopolk when recording that she was taken to Poland on 16 November 1102 to marry Bolesław III. Thus, the marriage took place between that date or in early 1103. They had only one known son, the future Władysław II the Exile, born in 1105, and a daughter (perhaps named Judith), born around 1111 and later wife of Vsevolod Davidovich, Prince of Murom.

Her date of death is uncertain, however, a wide scientific discussion over the death of Zbyslava was presented in the work of Karol Kollinger. One year later (in 1115), Bolesław III married Salomea, daughter of Henry, Count of Berg-Schelklingen.

== Notes ==
Zbyslava of Kiev Rurik Born: c. 1085/90 Died: c. 1114
Royal titles
Preceded by Judith of Swabia	Duchess consort of Poland; 1102–1114	Succeeded by Salomea of Berg
