= Groitzsch =

- Town
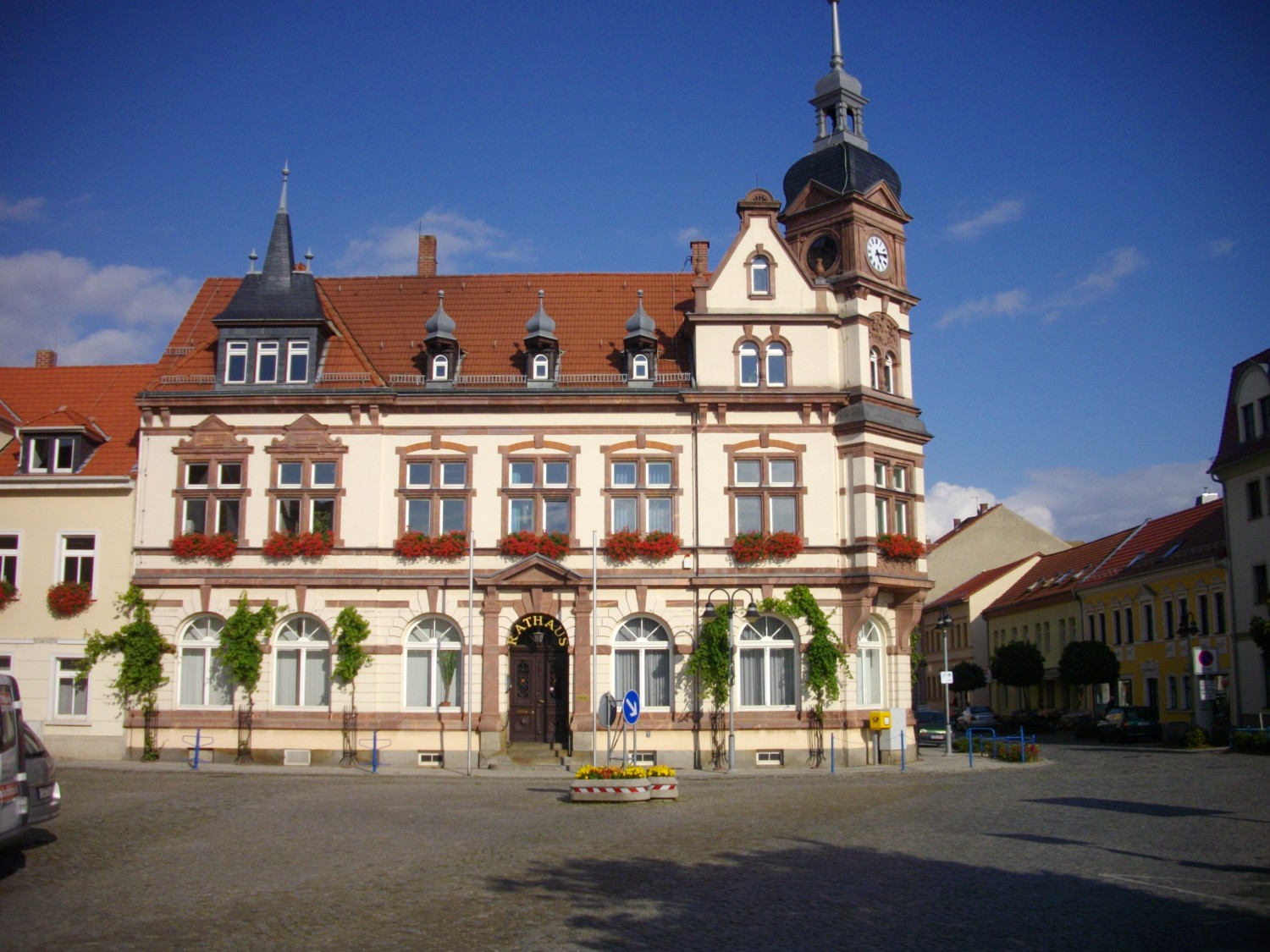
- Town hall

- Coat of arms

- Location of Groitzsch within Leipzig district
- Interactive map of Groitzsch
- Location within Germany Location within Saxony
- Coordinates: 51°9′20″N 12°16′50″E
- Country: Germany
- State: Saxony
- District: Leipzig
- Subdivisions: 28

Government
  - Mayor (2022–29): Maik Kunze (CDU)

Area
  - Total: 70.17 km^{2} (27.09 sq mi)
- Elevation: 152 m (499 ft)

Population (2025-12-31)
  - Total: 7,352
  - Density: 104.8/km^{2} (271.4/sq mi)
- Time zone: UTC+01:00 (CET)
  - Summer (DST): UTC+02:00 (CEST)
- Postal codes: 04539
- Dialling codes: 034296
- Vehicle registration: L, BNA, GHA, GRM, MTL, WUR
- Website: groitzsch.de

Groitzsch (German pronunciation: [ˈɡʁɔʏtʃ]) is a town in the Leipzig district, in Saxony, Germany.

== Geography and transport ==
The town is situated at the southern edge of the Leipzig Bay east of the White Elster river on the confluence of Schwennigke and Schnauder rivers, 20 km northeast of Zeitz, and 25 km southwest of Leipzig. A transition to the Central German low mountain ranges is notable in several elevated places within the municipal boundaries.

Bundesstraße B176 passes through Groitzsch itself, and Bundesstraße 2 traverses the subdistricts Kobschütz and Audigast. The latter leads to a junction with new Bundesautobahn 38 about 15 km northeast of the town.

The nearest railway station is in Pegau on the Leipzig–Probstzella railway. Public transport is provided by buses of Mitteldeutscher Verkehrsverbund with direct services to Pegau, Zwenkau, Leipzig, Neukieritzsch, Böhlen, and Altenburg. The nearest international airport is Flughafen Leipzig/Halle.

== History ==
The original Sorbian name was Groisca.

The oldest archaeological finds in the town district date from approximately 4000 BC. The area was comparatively densely populated in prehistoric times, and after the migration of Germanic tribes, Slavic peoples, referred to as Sorbs, migrated into the region after in the 7th century. Based on the continuity of pre-Slavic place names, it is likely that Thuringian settlements remained until the 8th or 9th century. During the Ostsiedlung of the early Middle Ages, the population mixed with settlers from Thuringia and Franconia. In the history of the town traces of Jewish life are also found.

The town was first mentioned in 1039 in the famous Pegauer Annals as a settlement next to an early medieval castle. This was one of the principal fortifies places in the region in the 11th and 12th century and is the location of some of the earliest known stone buildings in Saxony. In 1070 count Wiprecht exchanged his inherited estate in Balsamgau for the lordship of Groitzsch. He was a supporter of emperors Heinrich IV and Heinrich V, but opposed the latter in 1113, for which he was imprisoned until 1117. After restoration of his estate he was enfeoffed with the burgraviate of Magdeburg in 1118 and the margraviate of Meißen in 1123. The coat of arms of the town adopted in 1891, showing a silver horse armoured in gold walking on a red shield, has been designed after count Wiprecht's.

In 1214 Groitzsch was awarded town privileges. The castle was destroyed in the wars descending upon the region around 1300.

Shoemaking has been a traditional industry in Groitzsch since the Middle Ages. The produce was sold on the Leipzig Fair. The surrounding countryside with its fertile soil is shaped by agriculture. New industries were established in the 19th century, and the town was enlarged. In 1874 the Gaschwitz-Meuselwitz railway opened with a station in Groitzsch, and the opening of the Neukieritzsch-Pegau railway in 1909 made the town an interchange point.

The town and in particular the area around the railway station suffered heavy damage in aerial bombardments in World War II. American troops liberated Groitzsch on 14 April 1945 and left on 30 June 1945, after which date Soviet troops occupied the area. e The railway to Gaschwitz was interrupted by lignite mining in 1957 and lost its passenger service in 1966. The line to Meuselwitz lost its passenger service in 1976 when it, too, was interrupted by mining activities, and was finally closed in 1998. Lack of continued demand led to the closure of the line to Pegau and Neukieritzsch to passengers in 1997 and to freight in 1999.

The 950th anniversary of the town was celebrated in 1989. In 1996 the municipalities of Auligk, Audigast, Berndorf, and Großstolpen were administratively joined with Groitzsch.

== Notable buildings ==
- A 45 m tall steel framed water tower was erected in 1903/1903 and remains in use.
- The market square with the representative town hall has been restored.
- The remaining tower of the romanesque St Giles (St. Aegydius) church houses the regional museum. The church building itself was used as town hall and prison from 1563 until its destruction in 1633.
- The town mill was first mentioned in the 12th century, the current building was erected in 1803 and rebuilt in 1930 after a fire.
- Our Lady's church (Frauenkirche) of romanesque origin is located on a hill at the western edge of the town centre. It was last rebuilt in 1883/1884 and renovated in 2007.
- Only small remains of the castle of Wiprecht of Groitzsch on Burgberg ("Castle Hill") are still visible, but the site has been investigated archeologically and is protected as a historical monument.
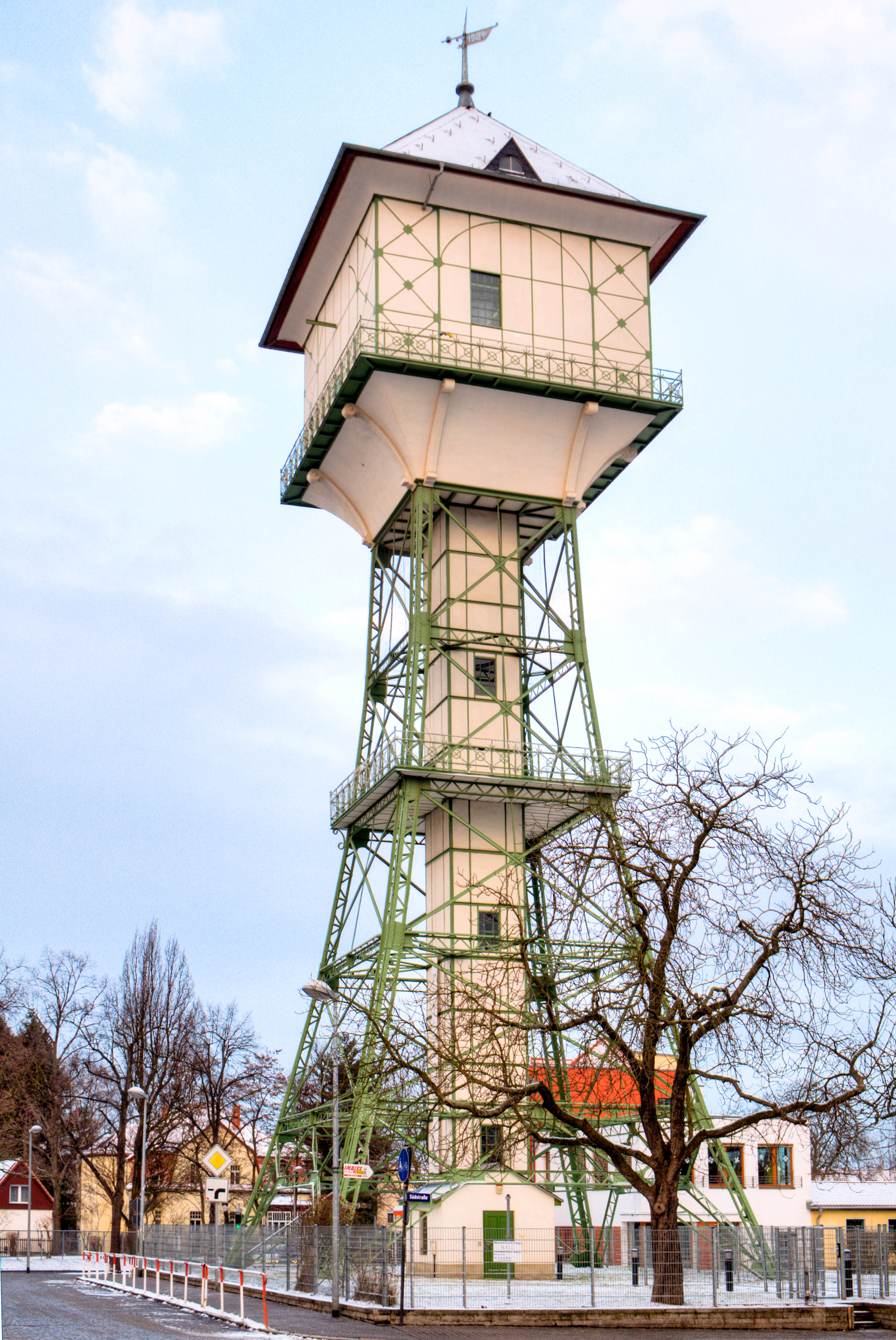
Water tower

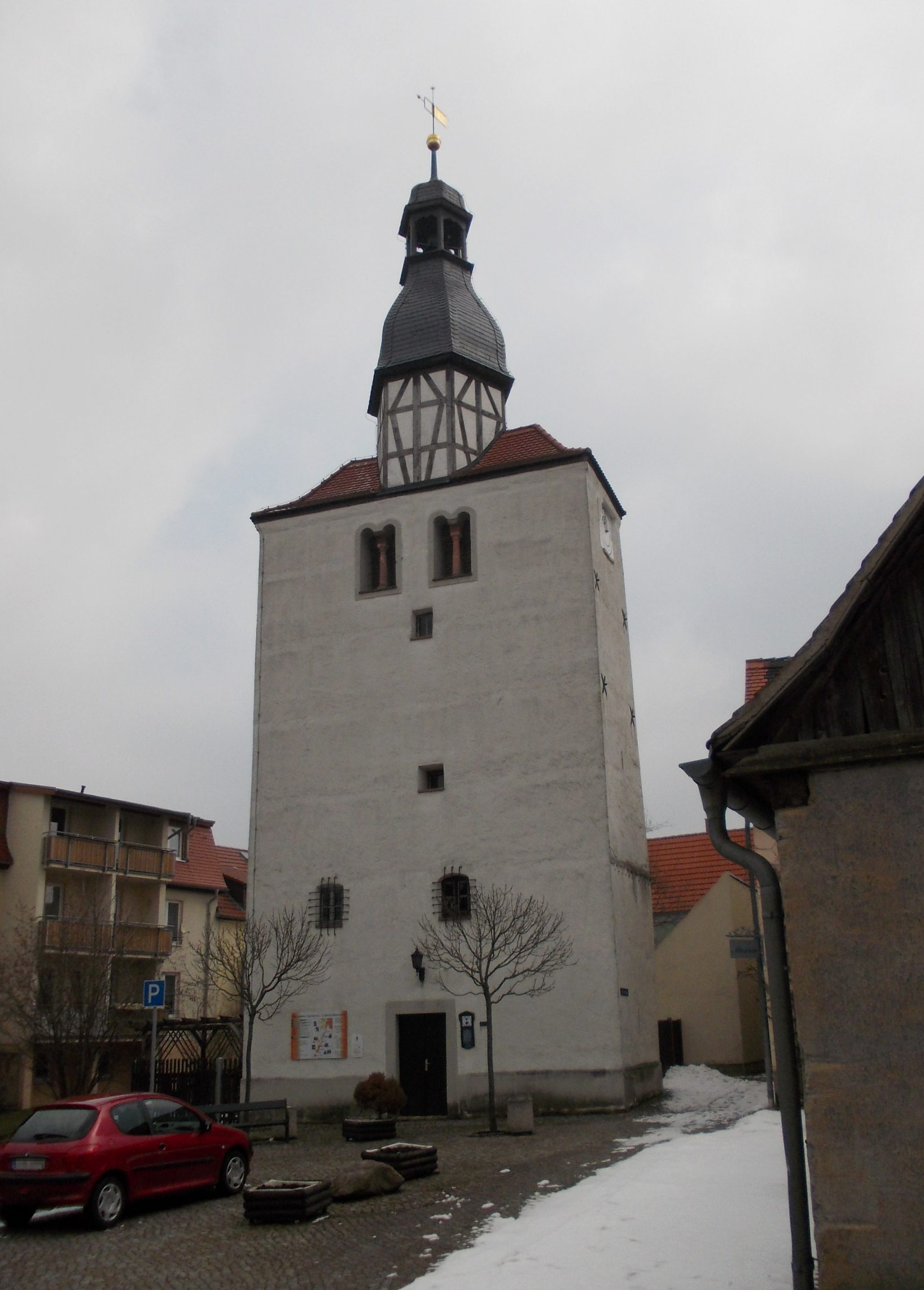
Steeple of former St Giles Church (museum)

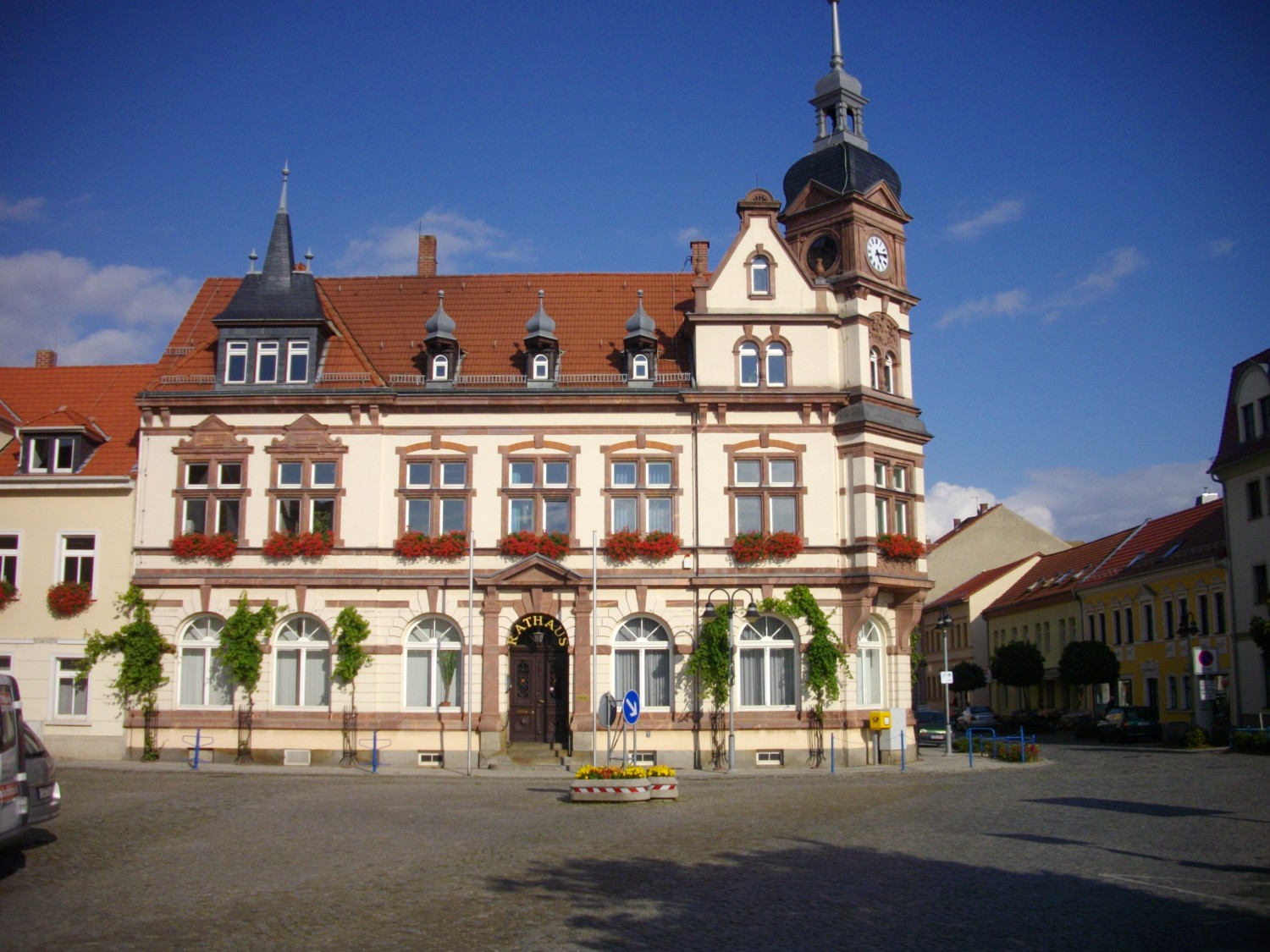
Town hall

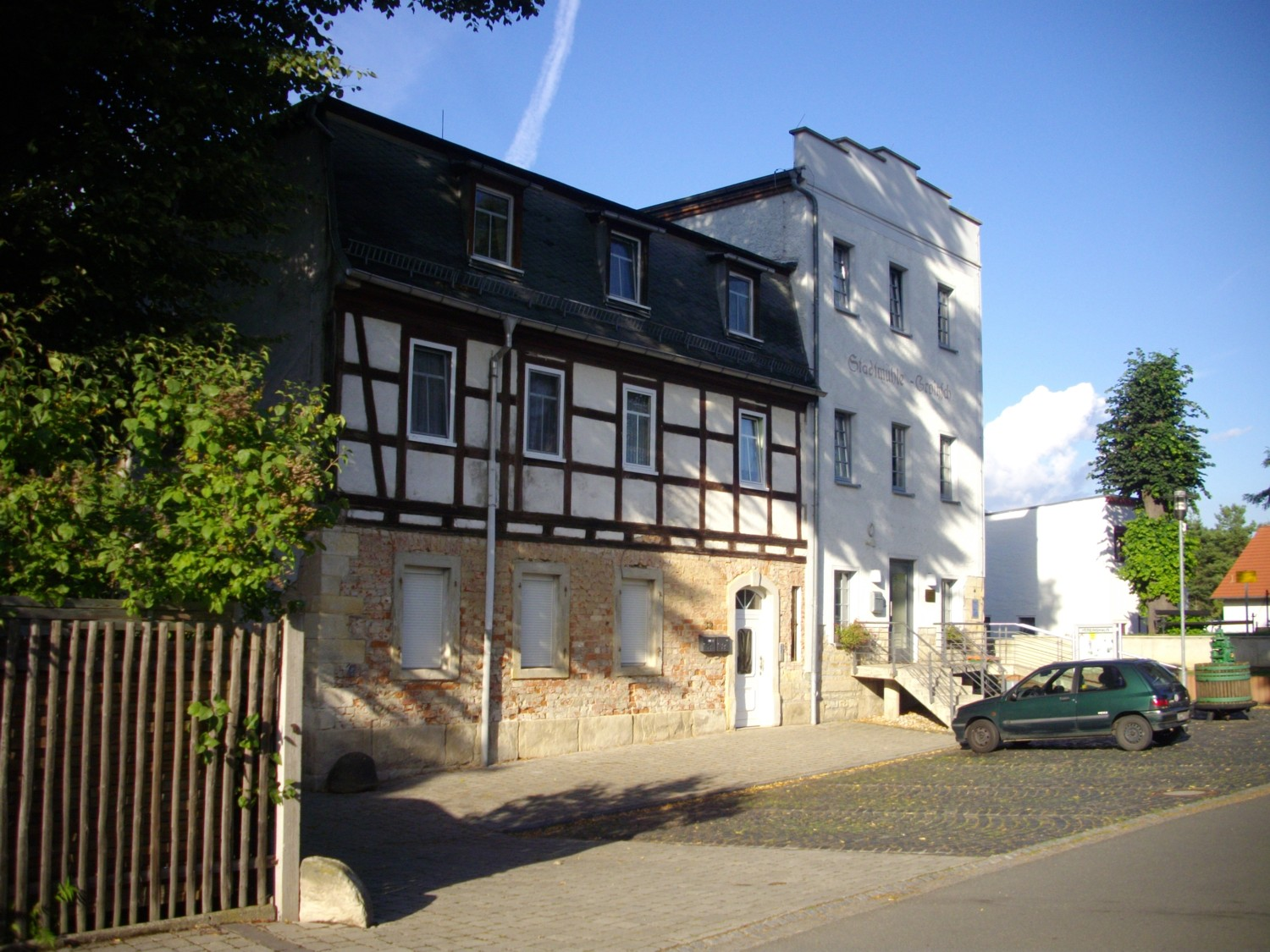
Town mill

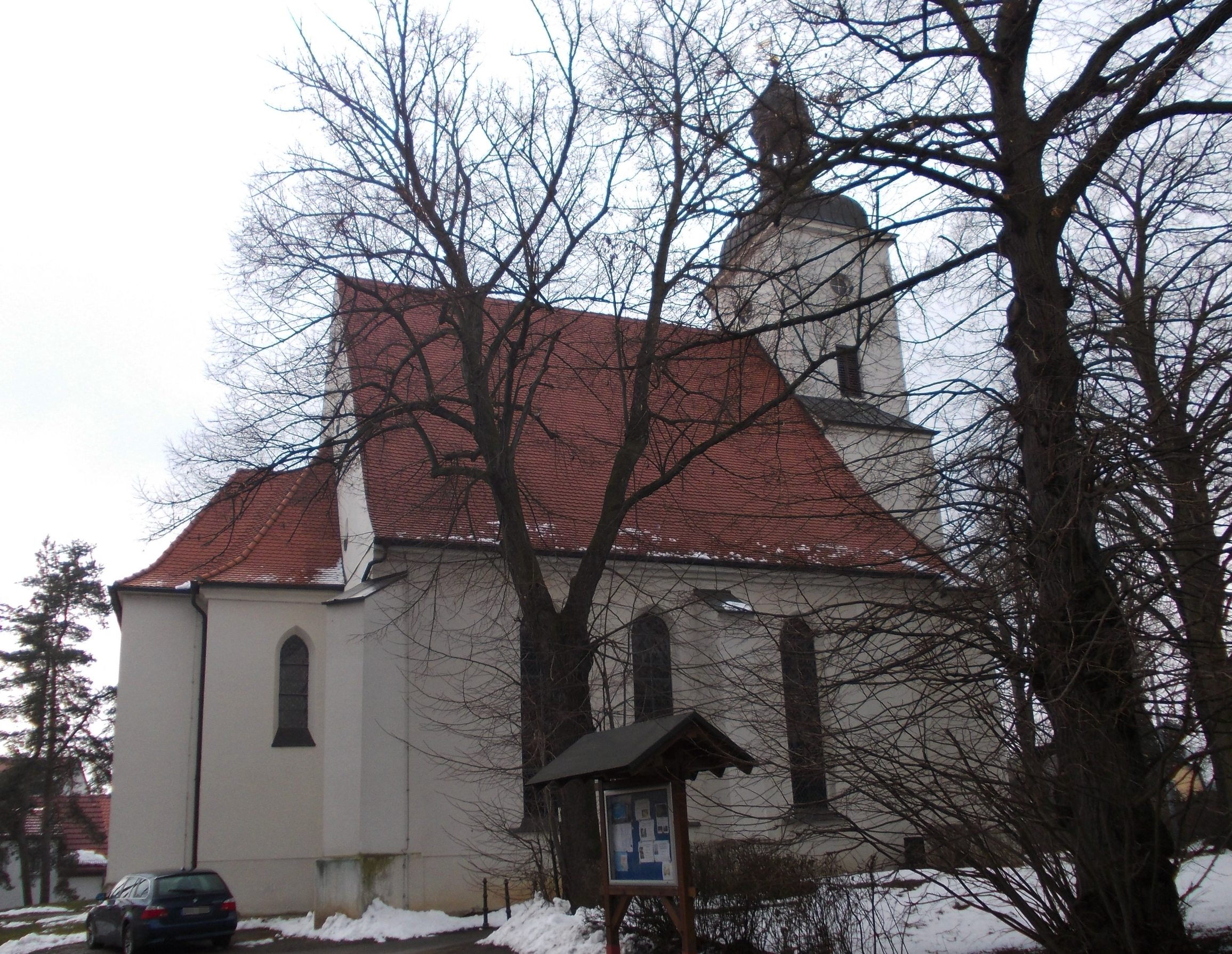
Our Lady's church

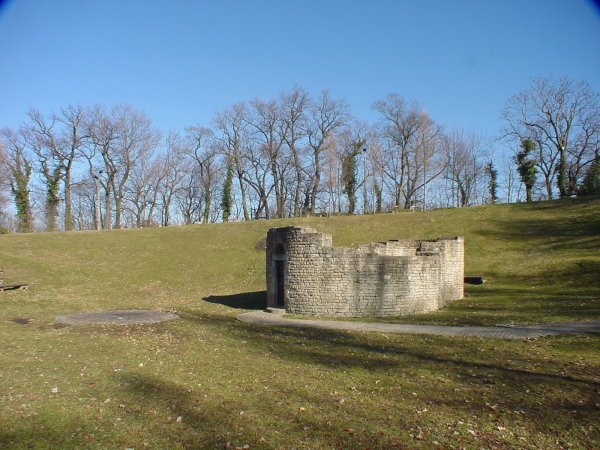
Ruins of round chapel on the site of the former castle

== Education ==
Groitzsch has a primary school, a secondary school offering education up to year 10, and Wiprecht-Gymnasium teaching up to matriculation examinations. A music and art school exists in nearby Borna, and adult education is offered by the local branch of Volkshochschule Leipzig.

== Religion ==
Lutheranism is the largest denomination in the town and its surroundings. The parish of Groitzsch encompasses the sub-parishes of Groitzsch with Pödelwitz, Audigast, and Auligk-Gatzen-Michelwitz, while the district of Hohendorf is served by the parish of Regis-Breitingen. The town church is Our Lady's church, a building of romanesque origins. Roman Catholics attend services in Zwenkau or Pegau. There is also a Mormon church in Groitzsch.

== Notable people ==
- Wiprecht of Groitzsch (1050–1124), Count of Groitzsch and Margrave of Meißen and Lusatia
- Samuel Rüling (1586–1626), composer
- Ulrike von Levetzow (1804–1899), friend of poet J. W. Goethe
- Hans Bemmann (1922–2003), author
