= Mstislav II of Kiev =

Grand Prince of Kiev (died 1170)

Mstislav II
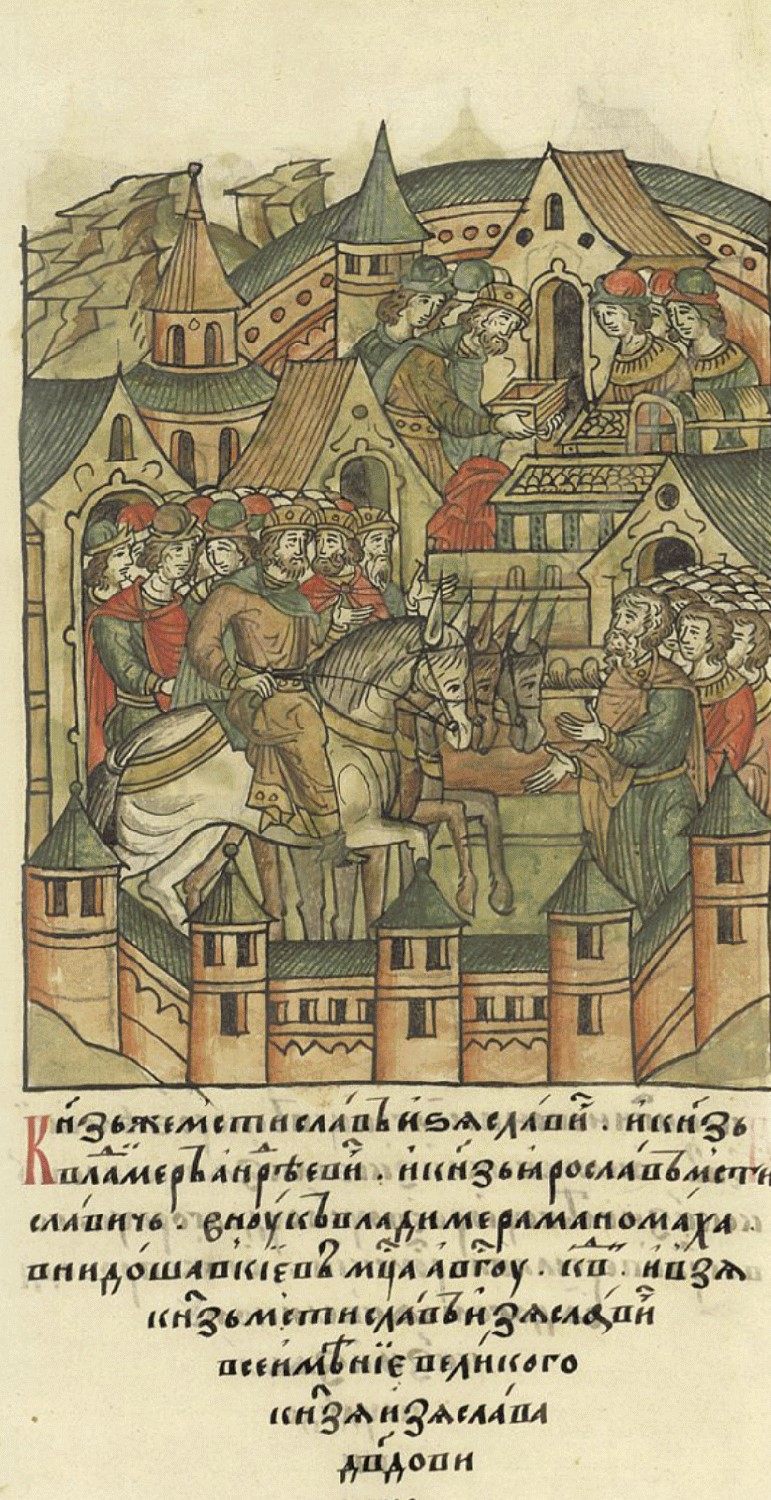
- Mstislav enters Kiev in 1159, miniature from the Illustrated Chronicle of Ivan the Terrible

Grand Prince of Kiev
- Reign: 22 December 1158 – 1159
- Predecessor: Iziaslav II
- Successor: Rostislav I
- Reign: 19 May 1167 – 12 March 1169
- Predecessor: Rostislav I
- Successor: Gleb I
- Reign: March 1170 – April 1170
- Predecessor: Gleb I
- Successor: Gleb I
- Born: c. 1125; Kiev
- Died: 19 August 1170 (aged 44-45)
- Spouse: Agnes of Poland
- Issue: Roman of Novgorod; Sviatoslav of Brest; Vsevolod of Volhynia
- House: Rurik
- Father: Iziaslav II of Kiev
- Mother: Agnes Hohenstaufen
- Religion: Eastern Orthodox Christianity

Mstislav II Iziaslavich (Note: Russian: Мстислав Изяславич; Ukrainian: Мстислав Ізяславич) (died 19 August 1170) was Grand Prince of Kiev from 1158 to 1159 and again from 1167 to 1169.

== Life ==
Mstislav was the son of Grand Prince Iziaslav II of Kiev. Along with his father, he participated in the wars against Yury Dolgoruky and the Chernigov princes. After an initial victory against the Cumans in 1153, Mstislav was defeated by the Cumans at the Psel river. Yury Dolgoruky forced him to flee to Poland in 1155, but the next year Mstislav returned with a new army and defeated Dolgoruky at Vladimir-Volynsk. Dolgoruky died in 1157, and Mstislav had himself crowned at Vladimir.

In 1169, Kiev was sacked by Andrey Bogolyubsky who removed Mstislav as grand prince. In March 1169, he defended Kiev from the troops of Prince Andrey Bogolyubsky, but was forced to leave the city and retreat to Volhynia. In 1170, he retook Kiev. He died in Vladimir and was buried in the Cathedral of the Holy Mother of God.

== Family ==
In 1151, Mstislav married Agnes, the daughter of Duke Bolesław III of Poland. They had:

1. Roman, Prince of Novgorod, Volhynia and Galicia (c. 1152–1205)
2. Sviatoslav, Prince of Brest
3. Vsevolod Mstislavich of Volhynia (died 1196)

== Sources ==
- Berend, Nora; Urbańczyk, Przemysław; Wiszewski, Przemysław (2013). Central Europe in the High Middle Ages: Bohemia, Hungary and Poland, c.900–c.1300. Cambridge University Press.
- Martin, Janet (1986). Treasure of the Land of Darkness: The Fur Trade and Its Significance for Medieval Russia. Cambridge University Press.
- Raffensperger, Christian; Ostrowski, Donald (2023). The Ruling Families Of Rus. Reaktion Books. ISBN 9781789147452.
- Morby, John E. (2002). Dynasties of the world: a chronological and genealogical handbook. Oxford University Press. ISBN 9780198604730.
- Wittkamp, Kristina (2024). "Historical remembrance and Medievalism in the Principality of Halyč-Volyn'". In Wittkamp, Kristina (ed.). Borderland Societies in East-Central Europe: Heterotopias, transculturality and identities in spatial manifestations. Logo Verlag Berlin GmbH. pp. 167–198.

Regnal titles
Preceded by Iziaslav II	Grand Prince of Kiev; 1158-1159	Succeeded by Rostislav I
Preceded by Rostislav I	Grand Prince of Kiev; 1167-1169	Succeeded by Gleb I
Preceded by Gleb I	Grand Prince of Kiev; 1170	Succeeded by Gleb I
