= Pegau =

- Town
- Coat of arms

- Location of Pegau within Leipzig district
- Interactive map of Pegau
- Location within Germany Location within Saxony
- Coordinates: 51°10′N 12°15′E
- Country: Germany
- State: Saxony
- District: Leipzig
- Subdivisions: 3

Government
  - Mayor (2022–29): Frank Rösel

Area
  - Total: 48.8 km^{2} (18.8 sq mi)
- Elevation: 127 m (417 ft)

Population (2025-12-31)
  - Total: 6,546
  - Density: 134/km^{2} (347/sq mi)
- Time zone: UTC+01:00 (CET)
  - Summer (DST): UTC+02:00 (CEST)
- Postal codes: 04523
- Dialling codes: 03 42 96
- Vehicle registration: L, BNA, GHA, GRM, MTL, WUR
- Website: www.pegau.de

Pegau (German pronunciation: [ˈpeːɡaʊ]) is a town in the Leipzig district in Saxony, Germany, situated in a fertile plain, on the White Elster, 18 m. S.W. from Leipzig by the railway to Zeitz.

It has two Evangelical churches, that of St. Lawrence being a fine Gothic structure, a 16th-century town-hall; a very old hospital and an agricultural school. In the 19th Century, its industries included the manufacture of felt, boots and metal wares.

== Rathaus ==
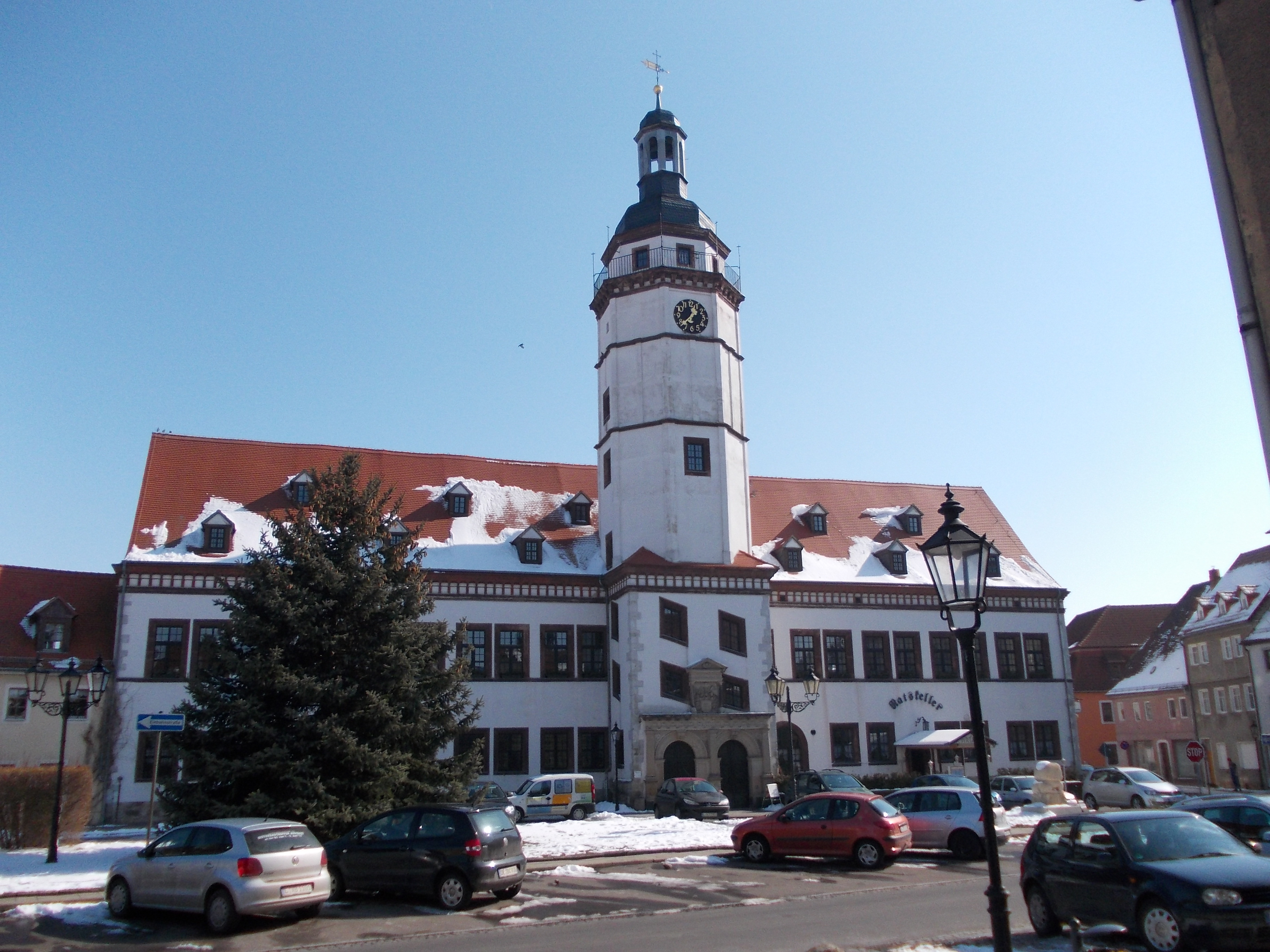

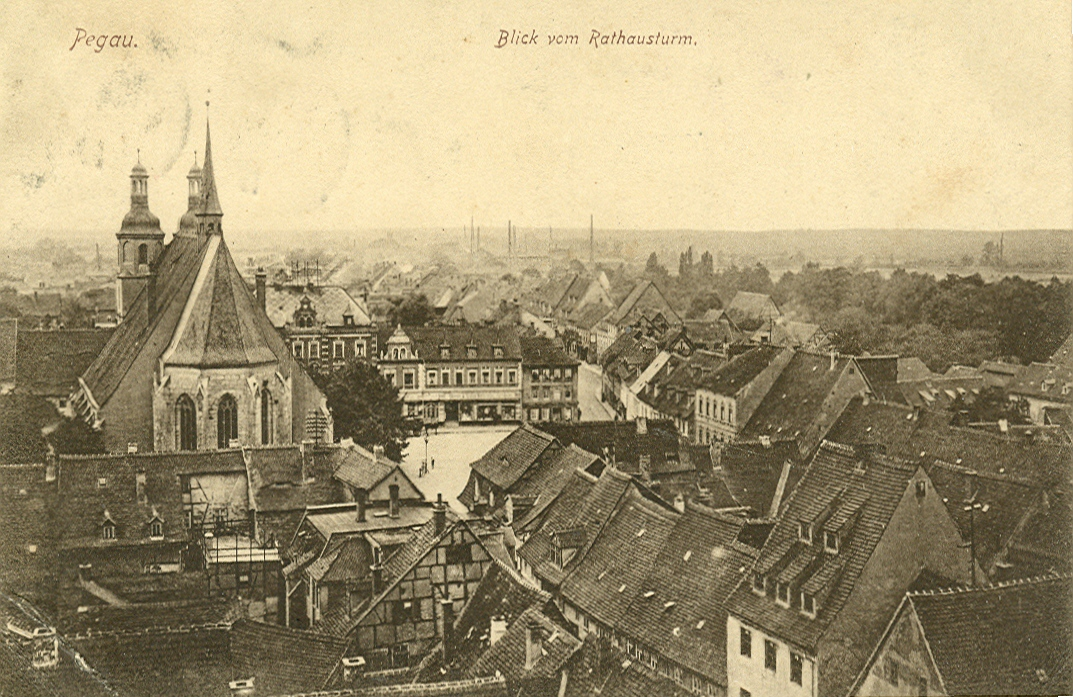
Tower view of Pegau in 1914

The Rathaus (town hall) is located in the middle of the city and has a distinctive character. It was built from 1559 to 1561 by Paul Widemann and Hieronymus Lotter in the style of the German Renaissance. It is extremely similar to Leipzig's Altes Rathaus (built-in 1556/57), which Widemann and Lotter had previously worked on. The Rathausturm (town hall tower) can be climbed during the summer season. At a height of 30 meters, the tower offers a panoramic view in which the viewer can sometimes see to Leipzig. The town hall is the seat of the city administration and has a large meeting hall, which is used for youth consecration, graduation parties, and other festivities.

== History ==
Pegau grew up around a Benedictine monastery founded in 1096 by Wiprecht of Groitzsch but does not appear as a town before the close of the 12th century. Markets were held here and its prosperity was further enhanced by its position on the main road running east and west. In the monastery, which was dissolved in 1539, a valuable chronicle was compiled, the Annales pegavienses, covering the period from 1039 to 1227. The town hosted witch trials in 1604-1605.

In January 2012 it absorbed the former municipality Kitzen.
