= Karol Maleczyński =

Polish historian

Karol Maleczyński (1897–1968) was a Polish historian.

Karol Maleczyński was born October 28, 1897, in Grębowo near Tarnobrzeg. He was the son of Stefan and Józefina. Maleczyński attended to gimnazjum in Stanisławów and Lwów from 1907 to 1915. He enrolled at the university in Lwów, but was enlisted to the Austrian Army. Later he served in the Polish Army. After demobilisation, he again enrolled at the university in Lwów, where he studied history. He graduated in March 1924.

Maleczyński gained his PhD at the Jan Kazimierz University in Lwów in 1924. He completed his habilitation at the same university in 1929 and became a professor in 1939. After the Second World War Maleczyński worked at the University of Wrocław.

Karol Maleczyński was the author of around 250 publications. He was also an editor of the Gesta principum Polonorum.
