= Schnauder =

River in Germany

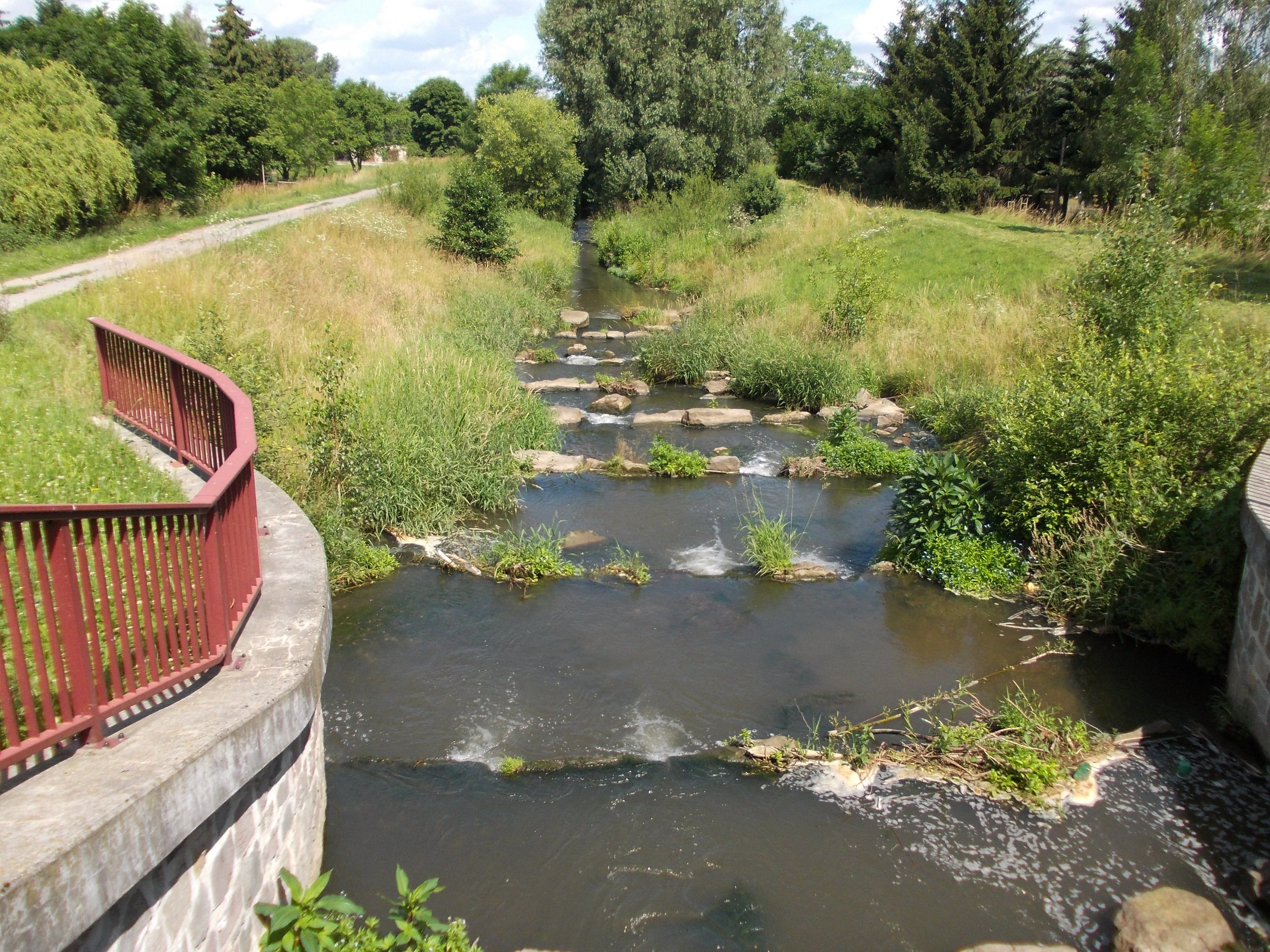

Location
- Country: Germany
- States: Saxony; Saxony-Anhalt; Thuringia

Physical characteristics
- Mouth
  - location: White Elster
  - coordinates: 51.1808°N 12.2843°E
- Length: 52 km (32 mi)

Basin features
- Progression: White Elster→ Saale→ Elbe→ North Sea

The Schnauder (German pronunciation: [ˈʃnaʊdɐ]) is a river of Saxony, Saxony-Anhalt, and Thuringia in Germany. It is a right tributary of the White Elster, which it joins near Groitzsch.

== See also ==
- List of rivers of Saxony
- List of rivers of Saxony-Anhalt
- List of rivers of Thuringia
