= Vsevolod Mstislavich of Volhynia =

Vsevolod Mstislavich was a son of Mstislav II of Kiev and Agnes, the daughter of King Boleslaus III of Poland. Vsevolod was Prince of Belz and Prince of Volhynia. He died in 1196.

== Family ==
- Aleksandr (?-1234)
  - Vsevolod
  - Anastasia, married to Bolesław I of Masovia
  - daughter
- Vsevolod (?-1215)
- Olena (possibly)

Vsevolod Mstislavich of Volhynia Rurik Born: ???? Died: 1196
Titles in pretence
Preceded by Roman the Great	2nd in line to Grand Prince of Kiev; 1174-1196	Succeeded by Mstislav Vladimirovich
