= Henry of Groitzsch =

Henry of Groitzsch (died 31 December 1135) was the second son of Wiprecht of Groitzsch and Judith, daughter of Vratislaus II of Bohemia. He succeeded his father as burggrave of Magdeburg in 1124.

In 1128, he was appointed Margrave of the Saxon Ostmark and in 1131 Margrave of Lusatia and vogt of the abbey of Neuwerk in Halle. He never succeeded in claiming the March of Meissen, which his father had held, against Conrad the Great.

Henry was married to Bertha of Gelnhausen (died after 1137). The marriage was childless. Henry and Bertha founded the monastery of Bürgel in 1133. He died in Mainz.

Preceded by Albert the Bear	Margrave of Lusatia; 1131–1135	Succeeded by Conrad
