= List of equestrian statues in Poland =

This is a list of equestrian statues in Poland.

== Warsaw ==
- Equestrian statue of Jan III Sobieski in the Wilanów Palace.
- Prince Józef Poniatowski Monument in front of the Presidential Palace by Bertel Thorvaldsen
- John III Sobieski Monument in Royal Baths Park
- Monument to The Polish Cavalry.
- Monument to The Polish Hussars.
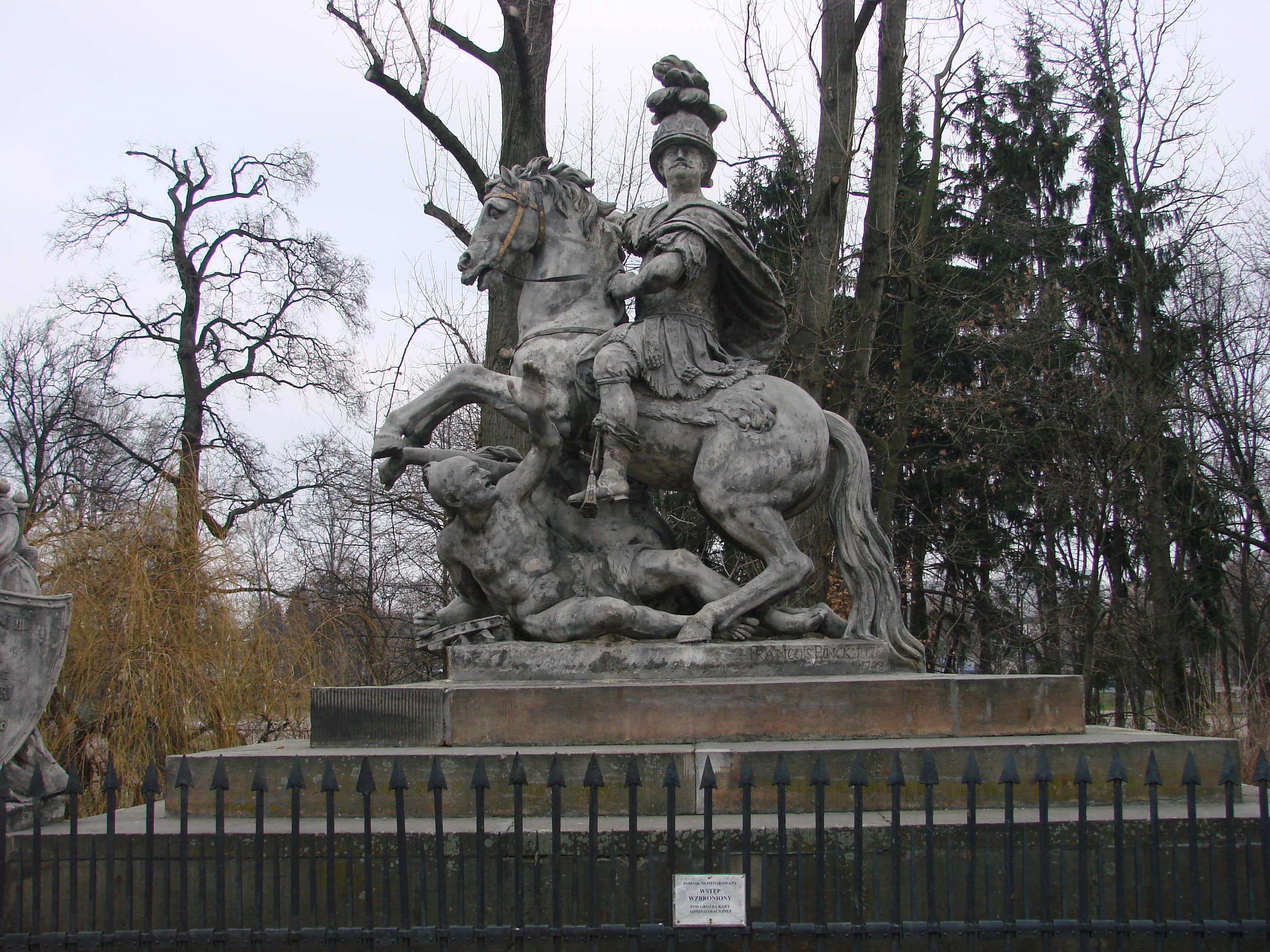
King Jan III Sobieski, Warsaw

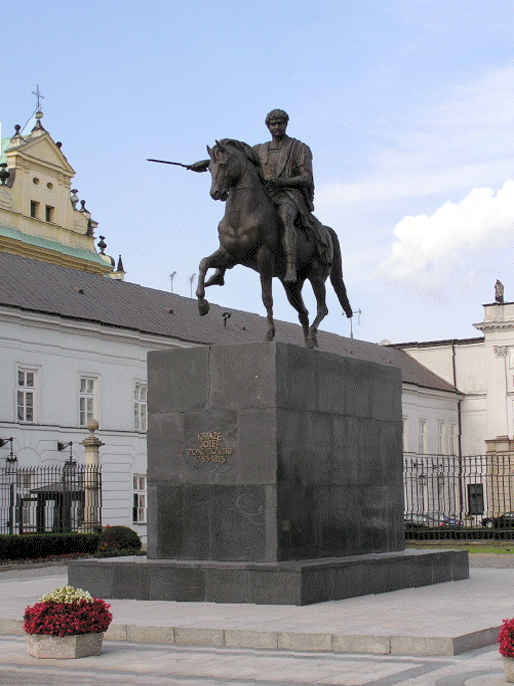
Prince Poniatowski, Warsaw

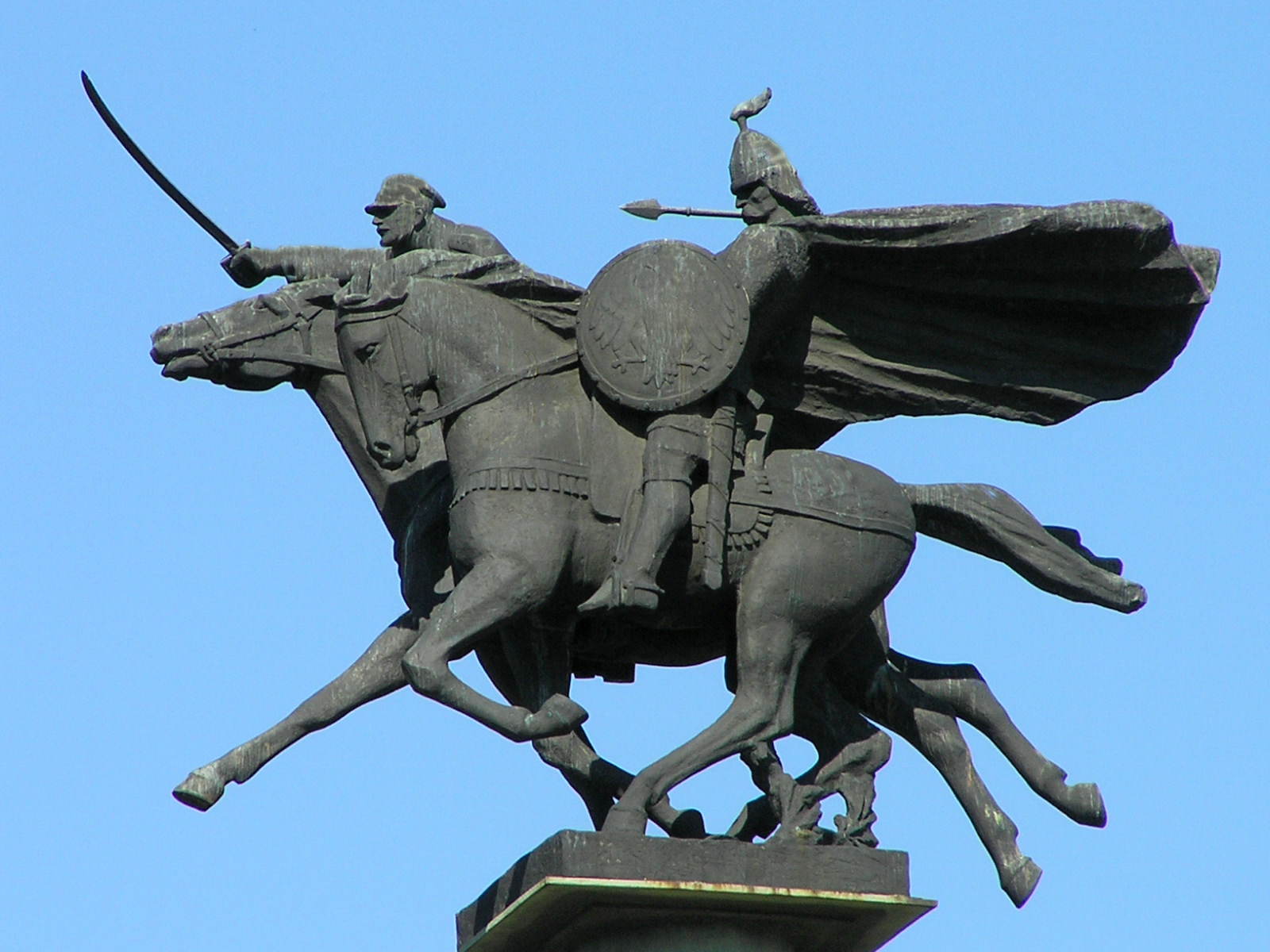
Monument to The Polish Cavalry, Warsaw

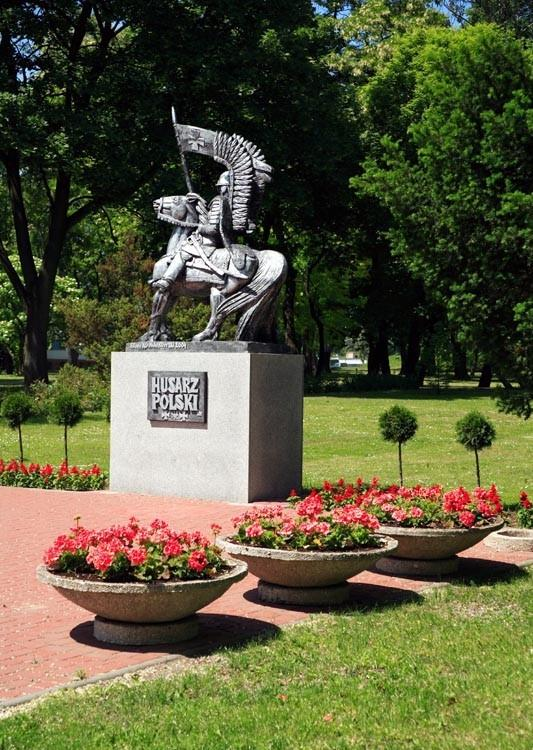
Monument to The Polish Hussars, Warsaw

== Bydgoszcz ==
- Equestrian of King Kazimierz Wielki.
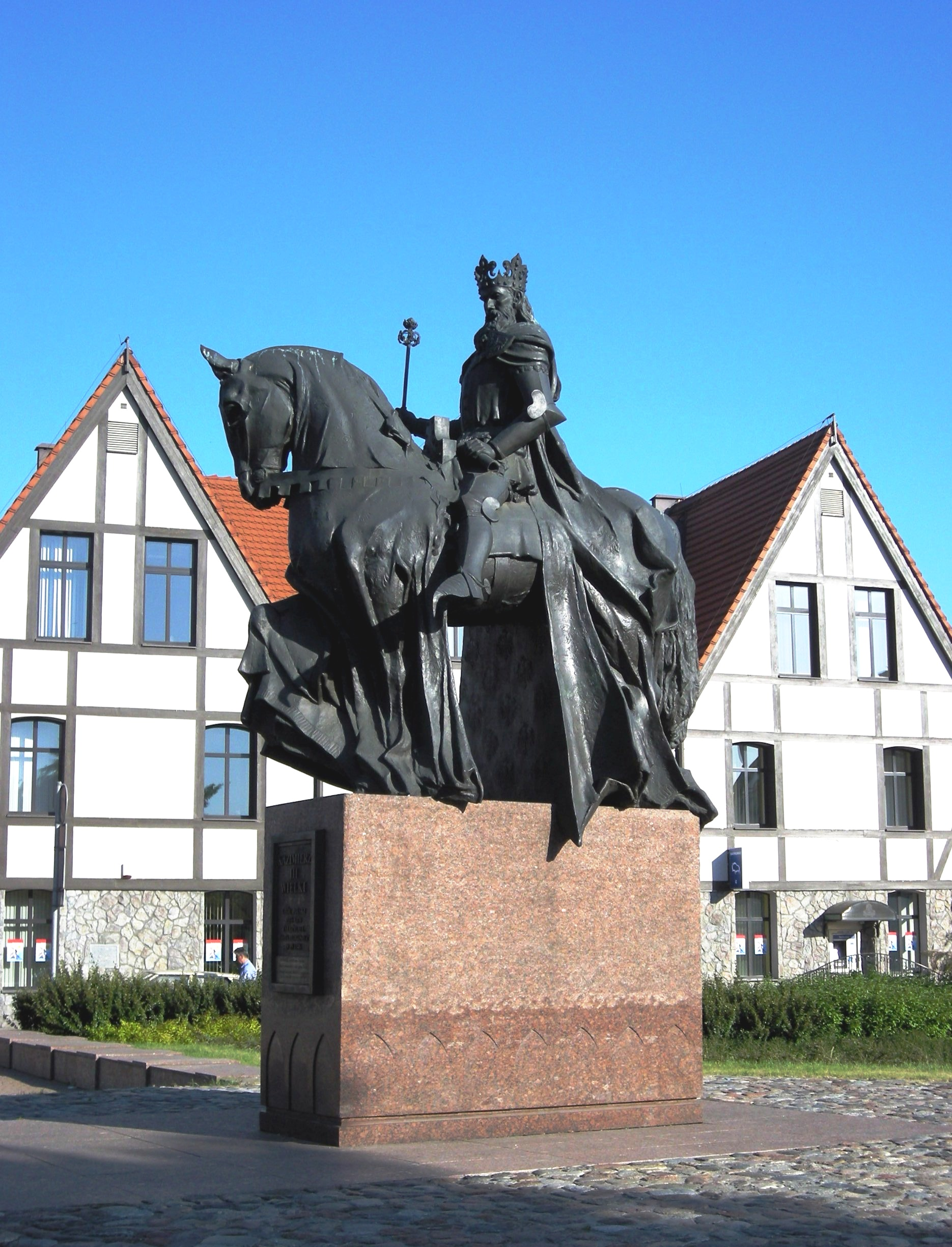
King Kazimierz Wielki, Bydgoszcz

== Gdańsk ==
- John III Sobieski Monument in Gdańsk by Tadeusz Barącz.
- Equestrian of Emperor Wilhelm I in front of the Brama Wyżynna (High gate), destroyed.
King Jan III Sobieski, Gdańsk

== Jelenia Góra ==
- Equestrian of Don Quixote and Sancho Panza by Vahan Bego

== Kałuszyn ==
- Golden Uhlan
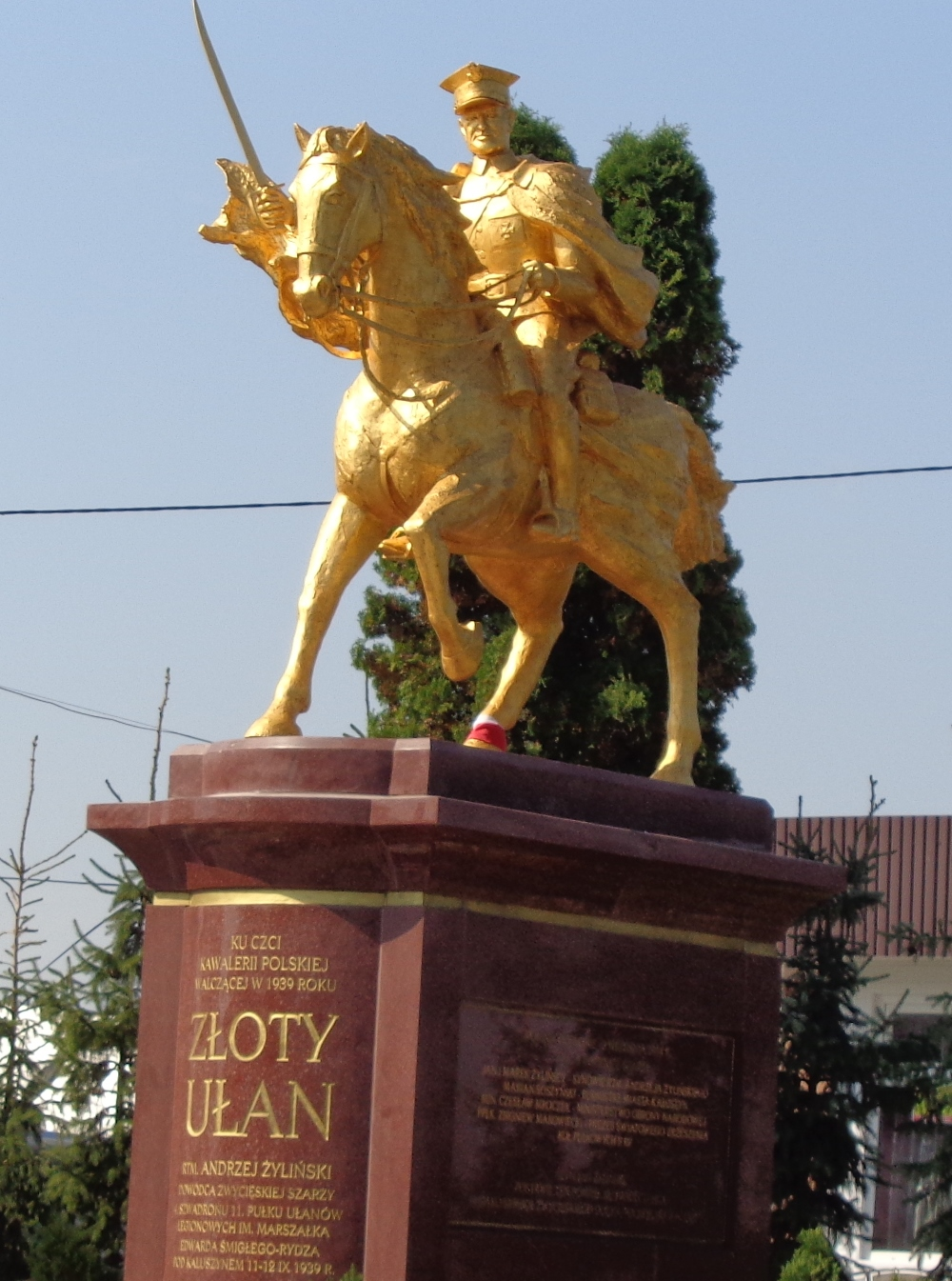
Golden Uhlan

== Katowice ==
- Equestrian of Field Marshal Piłsudski by Antun Augustinčić.
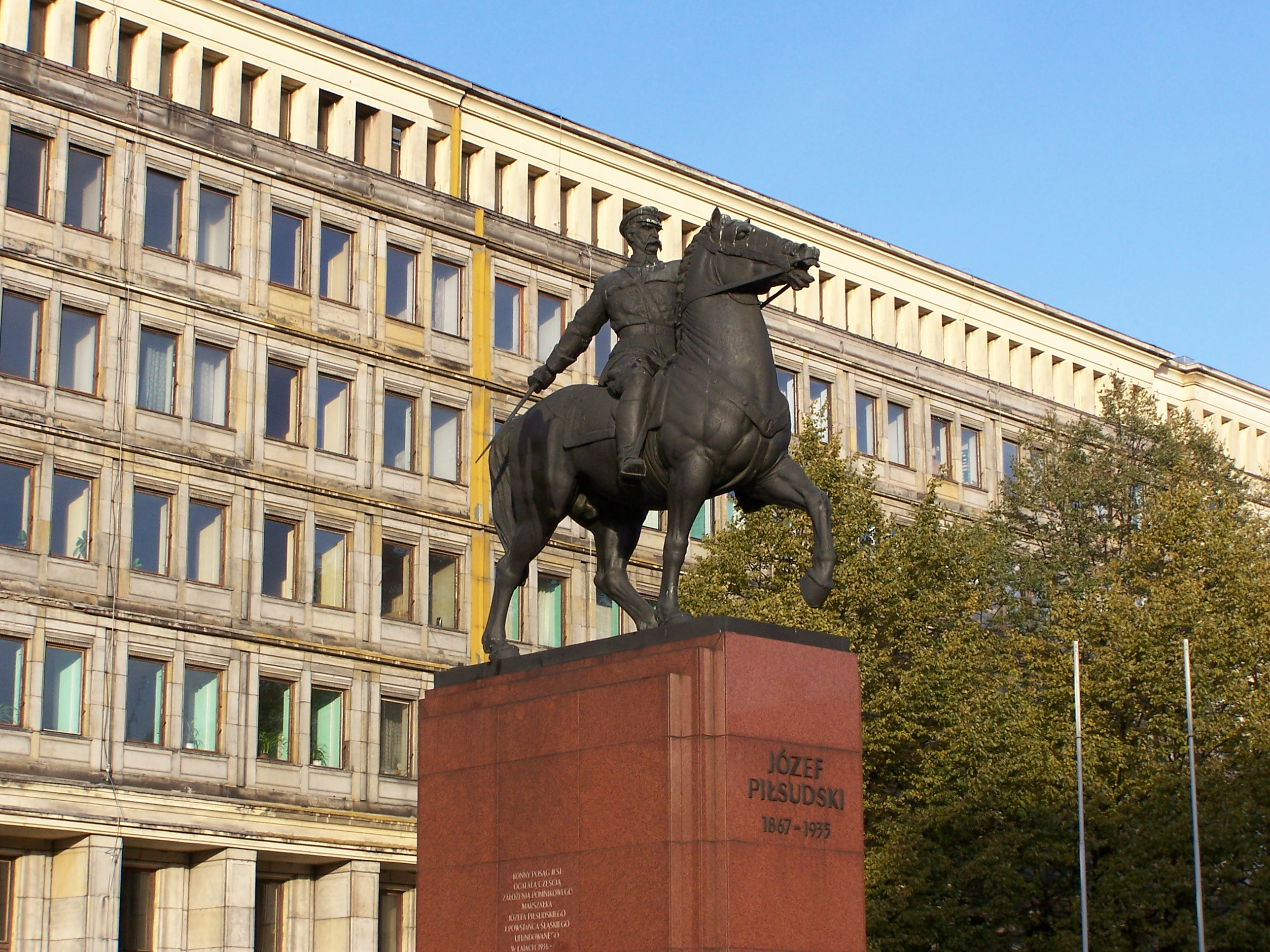
Field Marshal Piłsudski, Katowice

== Komarów-Osada ==
- Monument to The Polish Cavalry.
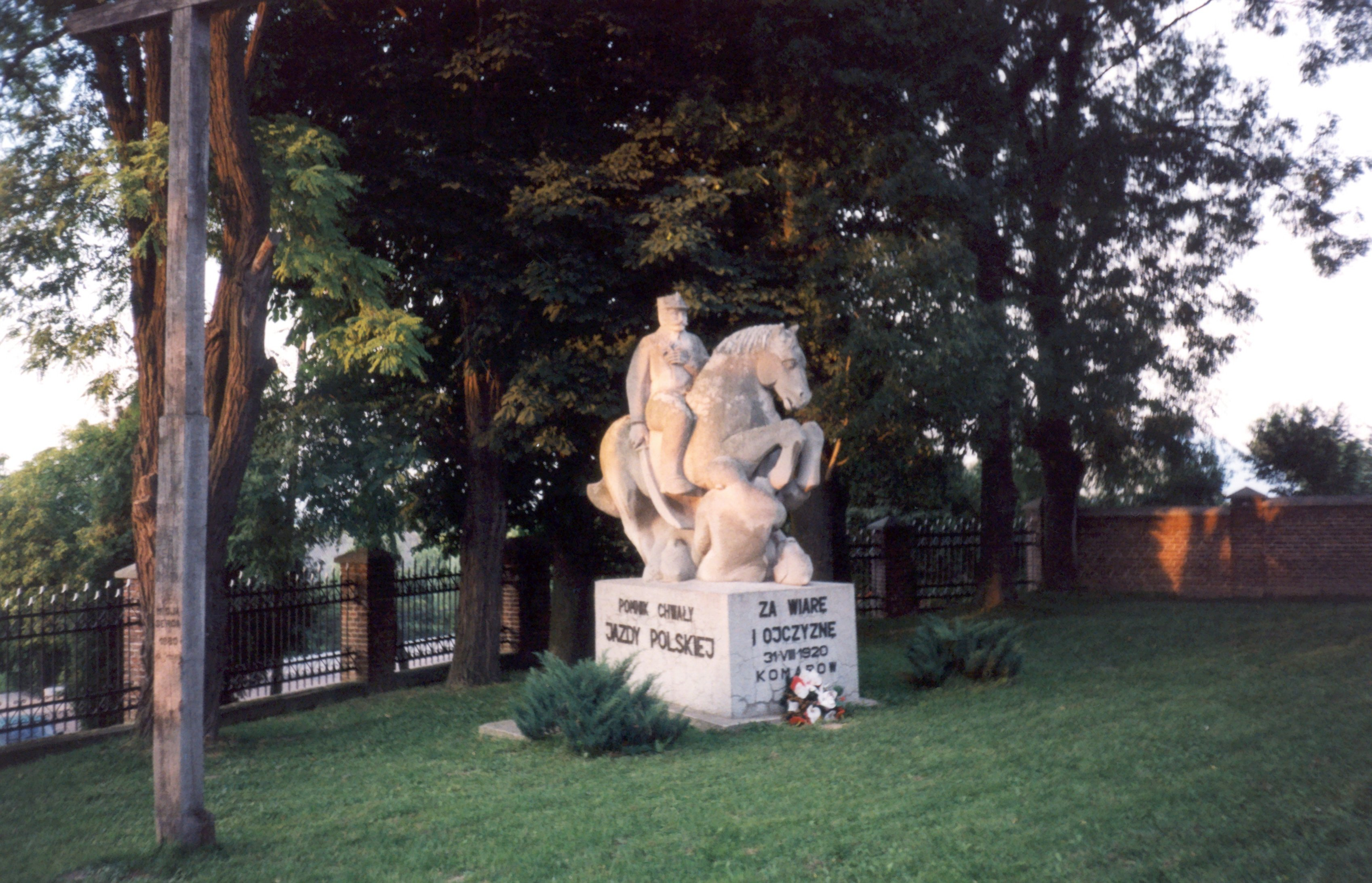
Monument to The Polish Cavalry, Komarów-Osada

== Kraków ==
- Equestrian of General Tadeusz Kościuszko by Leonard Marconi and Antoni Popiel.
- Battle of Grunwald Monument (Monument to King Władysław Jagiełło) by Antoni Wiwulski, 1914.
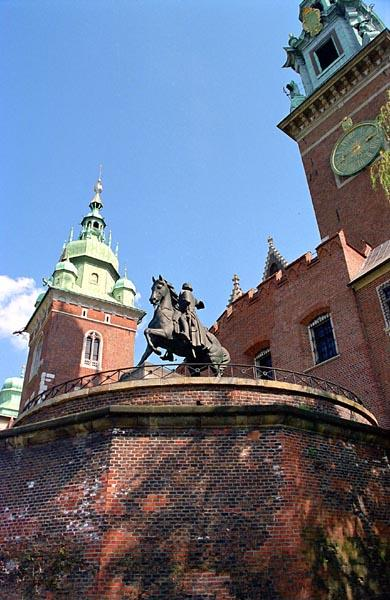
Tadeusz Kościuszko, Kraków

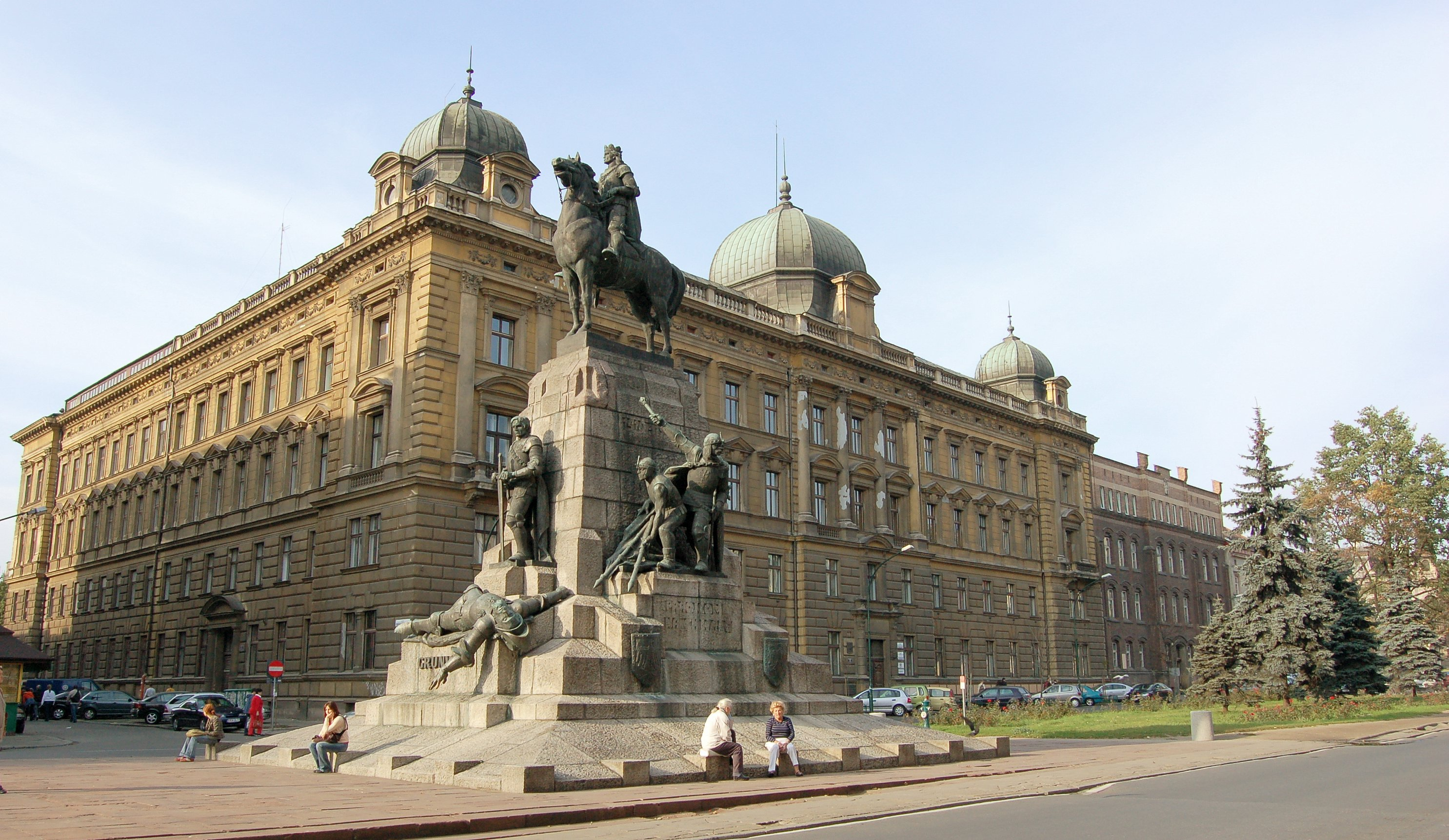
Battle of Grunwald monument, Kraków

== Lublin ==
- Equestrian of Field Marshal Piłsudski by Jan Raszka.
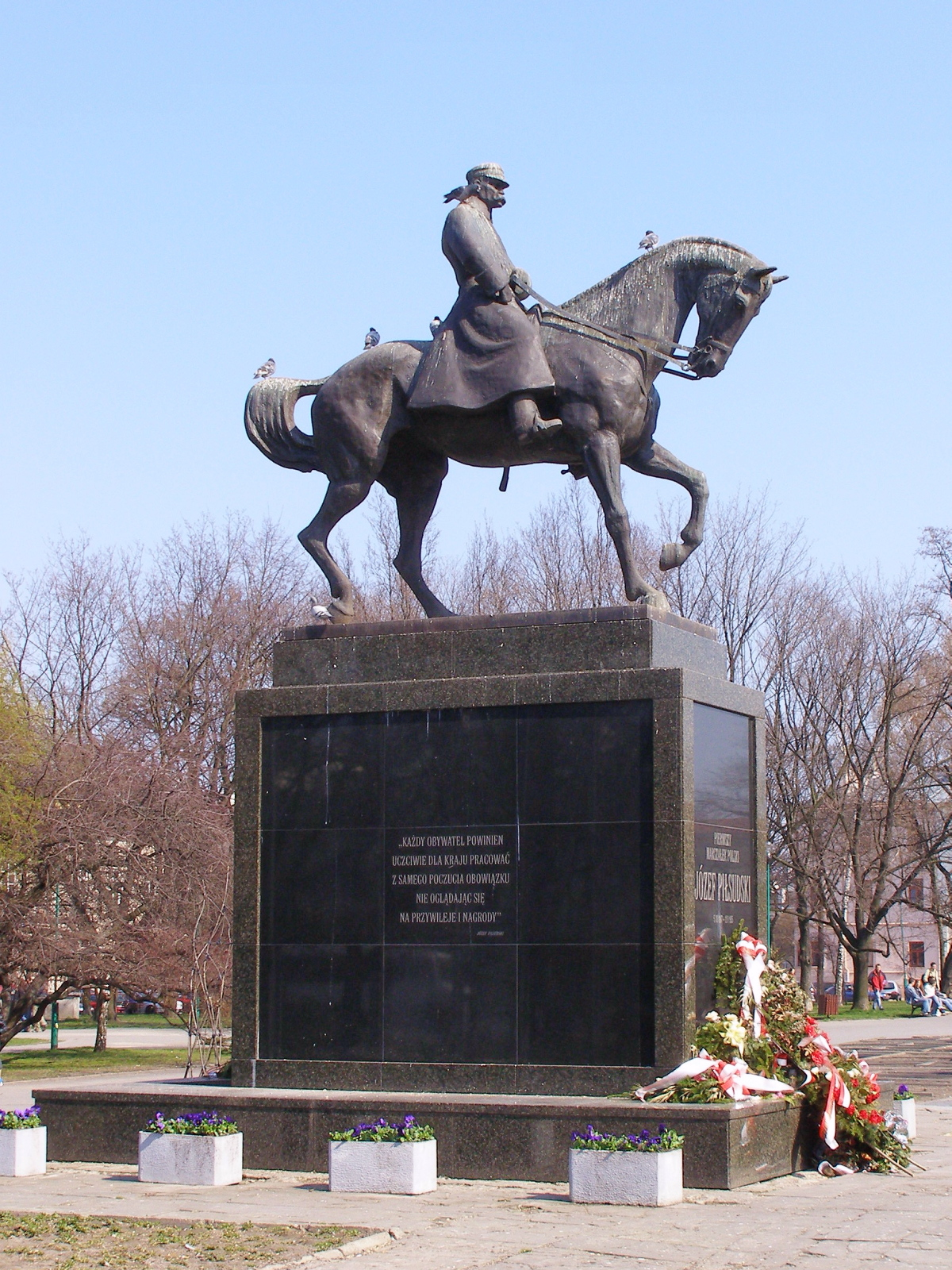
Field Marshal Piłsudski, Lublin

== Malbork ==
- Equestrian of Casimir IV Jagiellon by Mariusz Białecki.
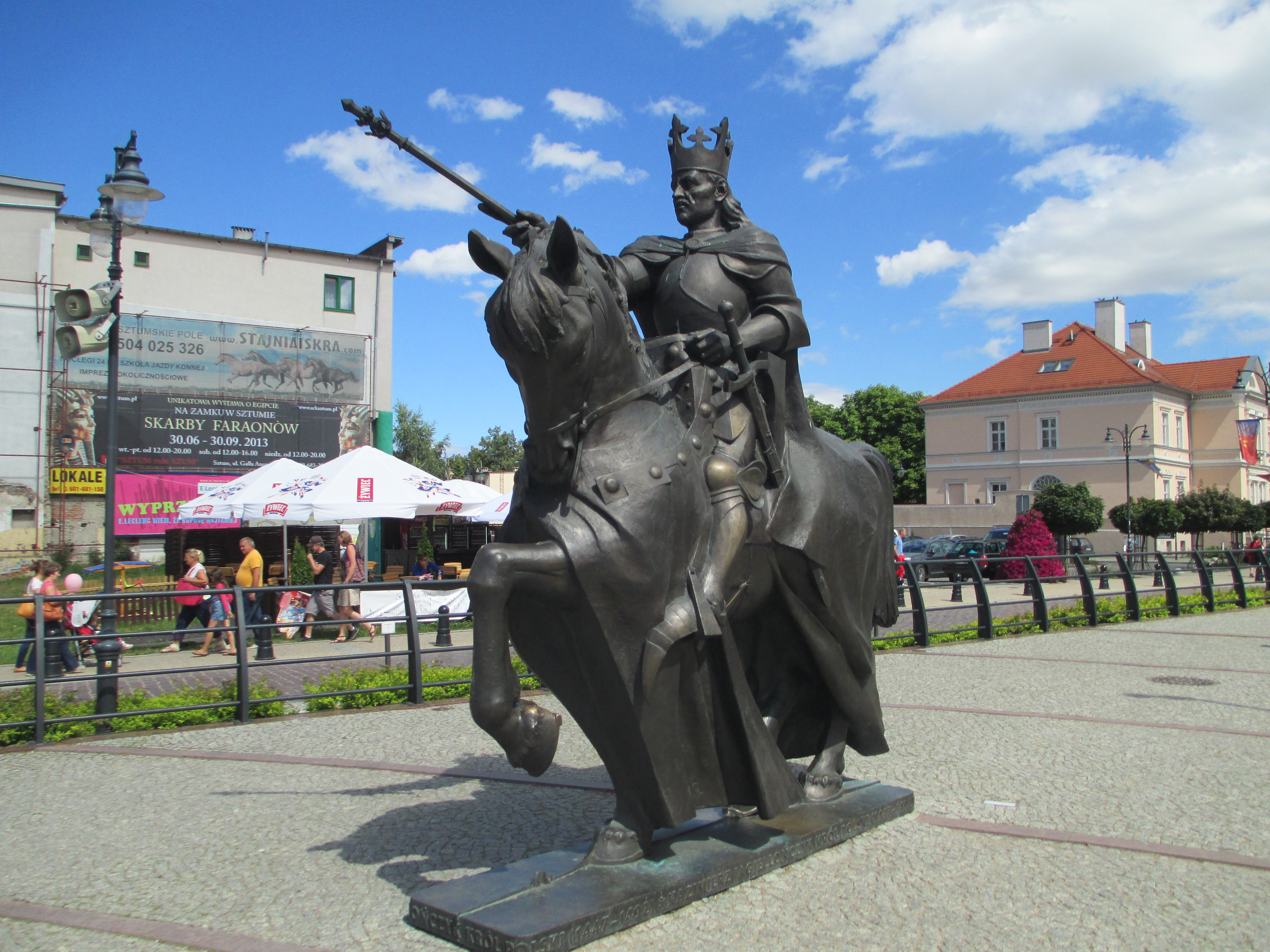
Casimir IV Jagiellon, Malbork

== Marcinkowo Górne ==
- Equestrian of Prince Leszek Biały by Jakub Juszczyk, 1927.
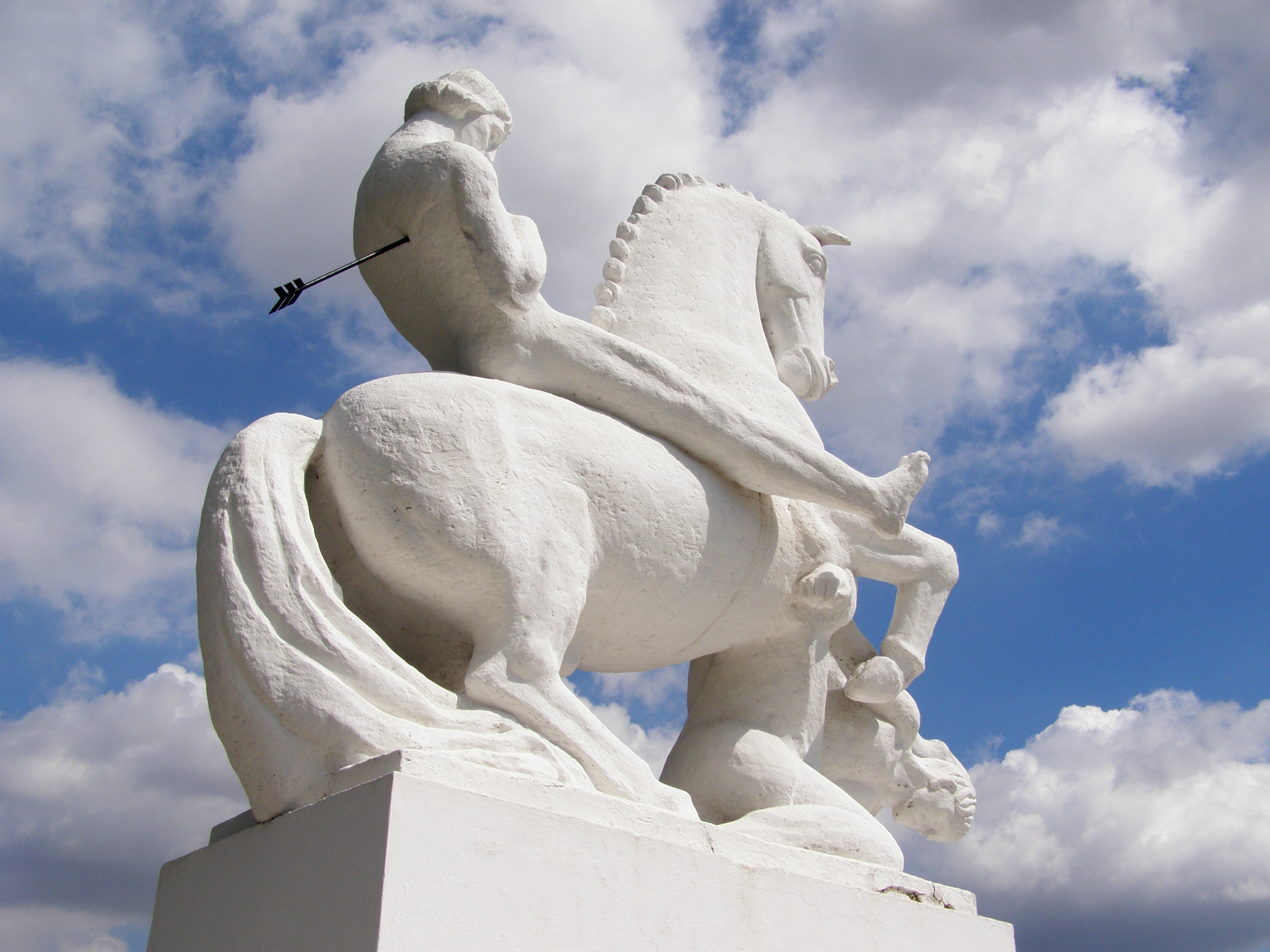
Prince Leszek Biały, Marcinkowo Górne

== Odolanów ==
- Monument to Saint Martin of Tours by Jerzy Sobociński.
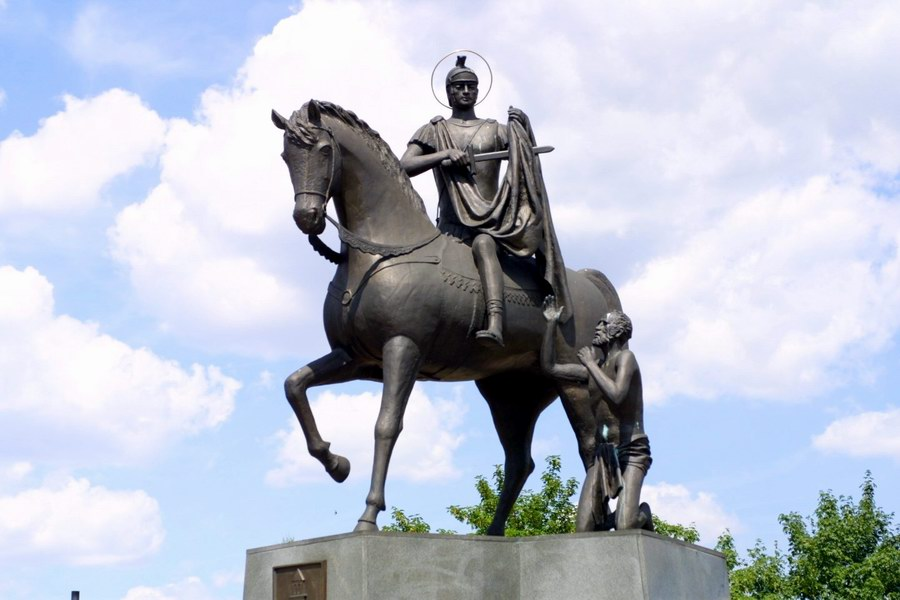
Saint Martin of Tours, Odolanów

== Opole ==
- Monument to Postal Workers killed in action in World War I by Felix Kupsch.
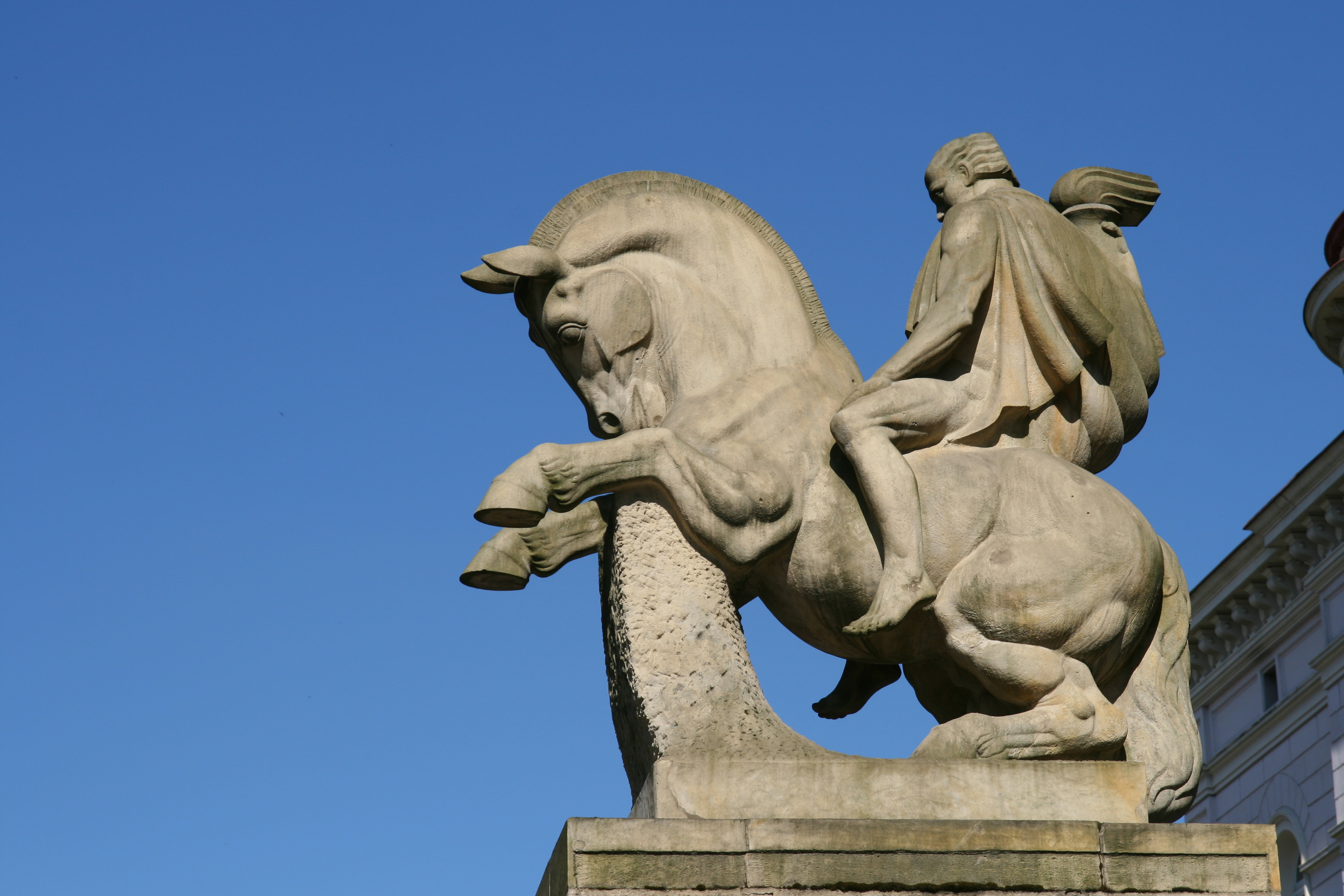
Monument to Postal Workers, Opole

== Ostrów Mazowiecka ==
- Equestrian of Field Marshal Józef Piłsudski by Antoni Pug-Miszewski.

== Poznań ==
- Monument to 15th Poznań Uhlans regiment.
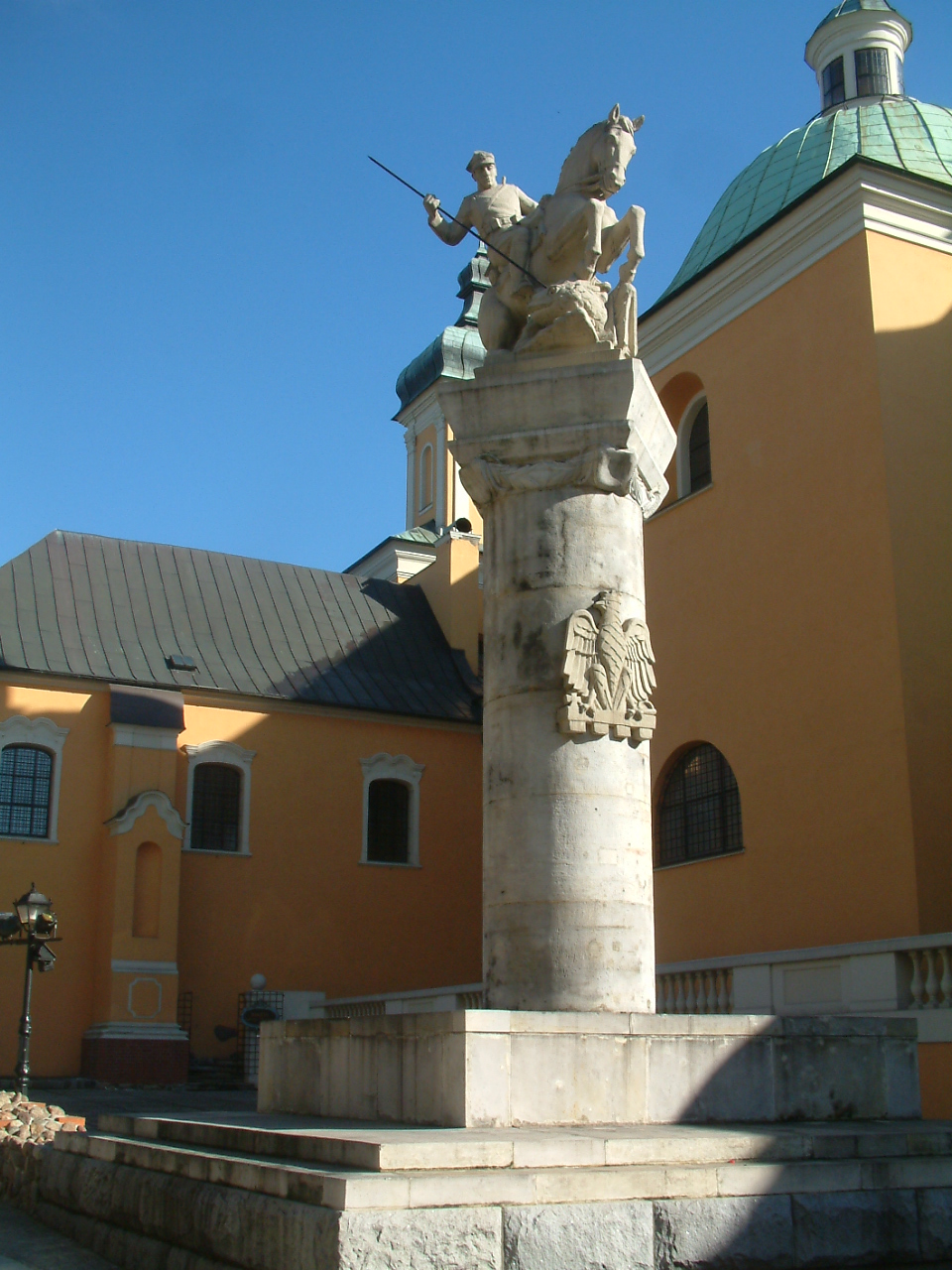
Monument to Uhlans, Poznań

== Szczecin ==
- Equestrian of Bartolomeo Colleoni, the replica of the statue in Venice.
- Monument to Emperor Wilhelm I, destroyed.
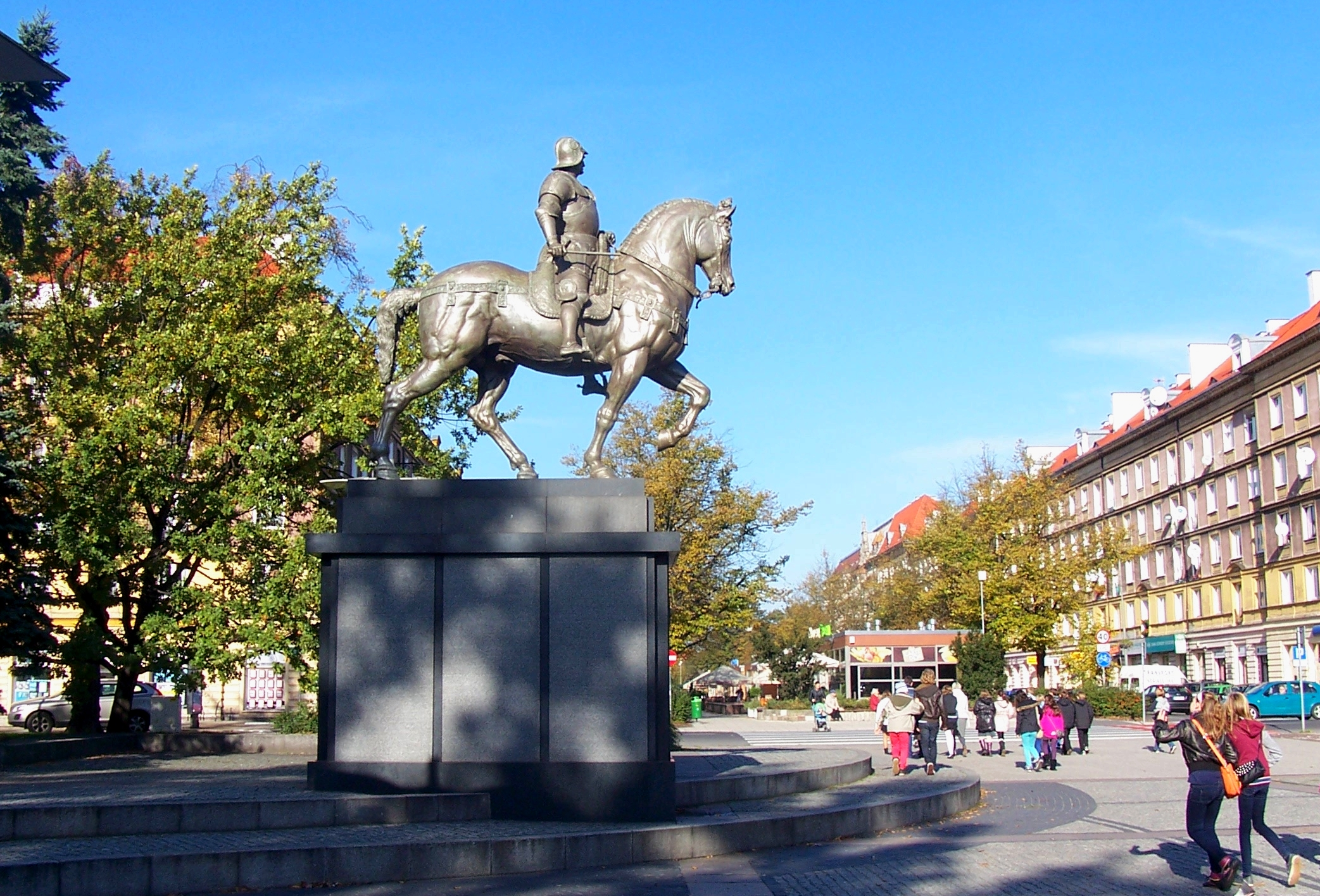
Bartolomeo Colleoni, Szczecin

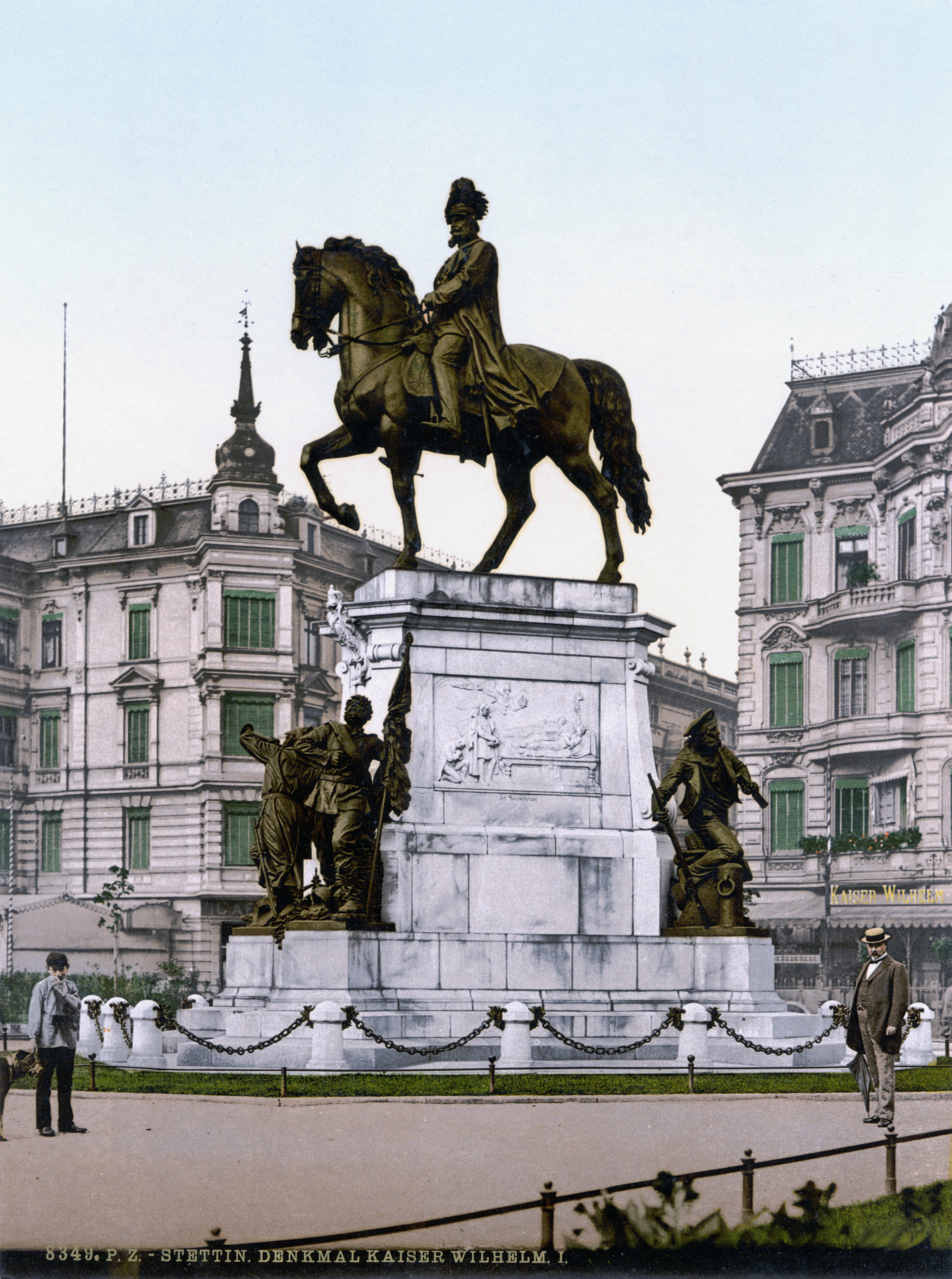
Emperor Wilhelm I, Szczecin

== Wolica Śniatycka ==
- Monument to the Glory of Cavalry and Horse Artillery

== Wrocław ==
- Equestrian of King Bolesław Chrobry, 2007.
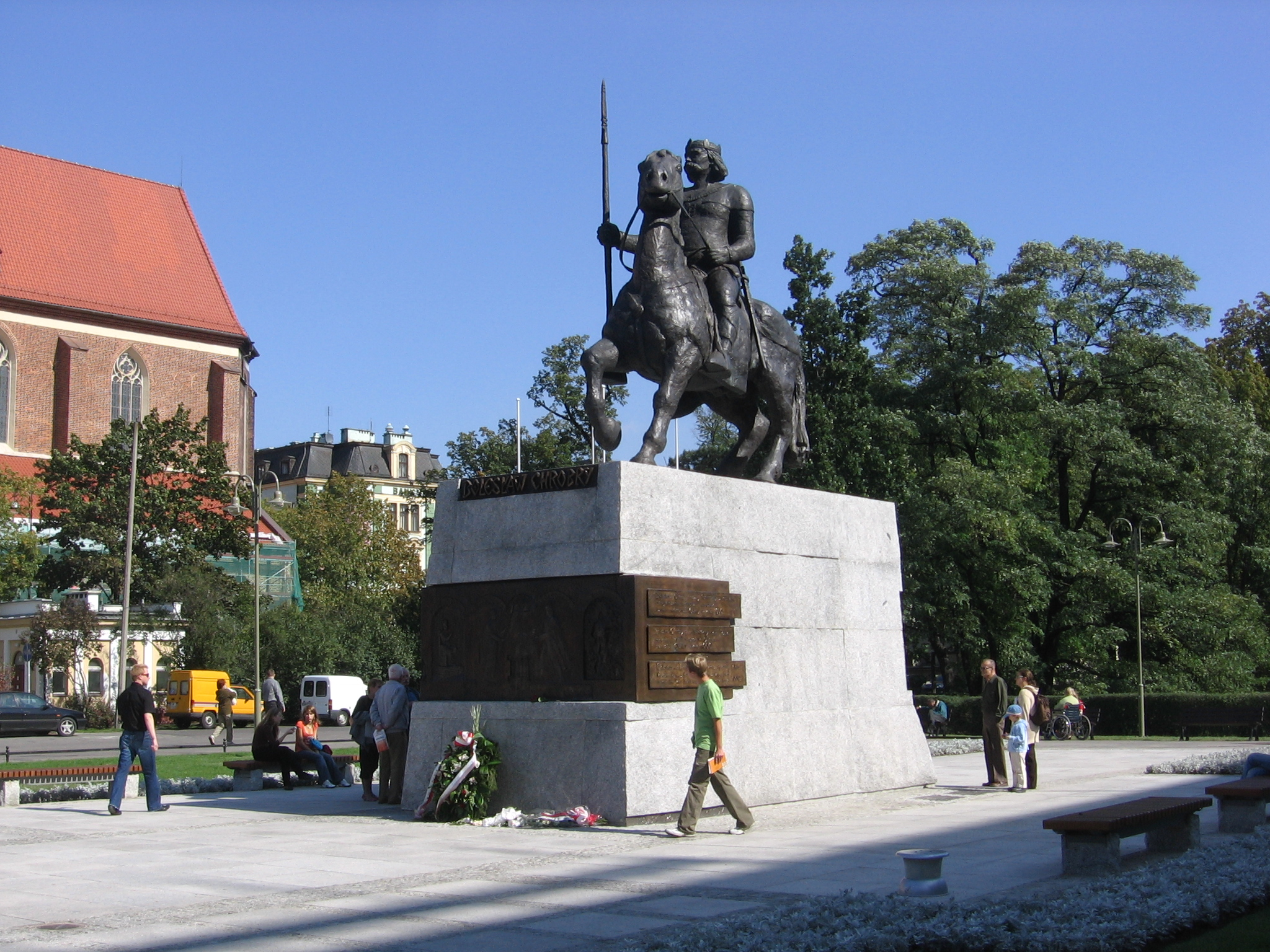
King Bolesław Chrobry, Wrocław

== Zamość ==
- Equestrian of Hetman Jan Zamoyski by Marian Konieczny.
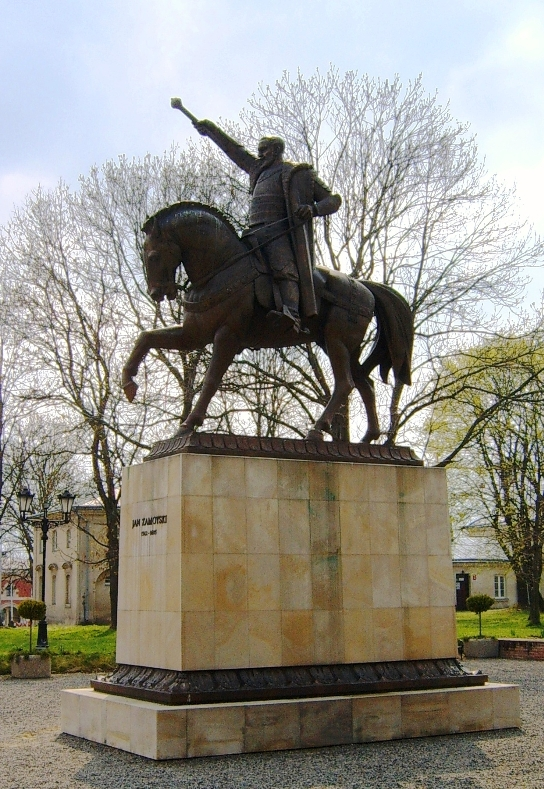
Jan Zamoyski, Zamość

== See also ==
- List of equestrian statues
