= Adelaide of Poland =

Polish Piast dynasty princess (died 1211)

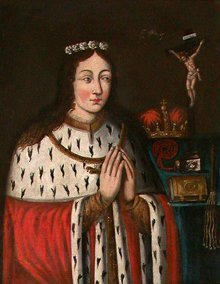
- Fragment of an image of Adelaide in the Dominican Church of Sandomierz.
- Born: ca. late 1170s / early 1180s
- Died: 8 December 1211
- House: Piast
- Father: Casimir II the Just
- Mother: Helen of Znojmo

Adelaide of Poland (Polish: Adelajda Kazimierzówna) (c. late 1170s / early 1180s – 8 December 1211), was a Polish princess and member of the Piast dynasty.

She was the daughter of Casimir II the Just, Duke of Sandomierz and High Duke of Poland, and his wife Helena of Znojmo, a Přemyslid princess.

On the basis of the inscription of her tombstone at the Dominican Church and Convent of St. James in Sandomierz and two different reports by Jan Długosz, most modern historians agree about the facts covering Adelaide's life. There exists a dominant view in historiography about her filiation and death date. According to these historians, Adelaide was indeed the daughter of Casimir II the Just and died in 1211. She was the founder of the Convent of St. James. During the 19th century, there appeared a theory which suggested that Adelaide was the daughter of Casimir I of Kuyavia, who had entered the Convent of St. James as a nun and died there in 1291. This view, which had been accepted by several scholars, is now disputed. More recent historiography recognized her as the daughter of Casimir II the Just, and she was the founder of the Convent of St. James. She was buried at the convent after her death in 1211.

== Life ==
Adelaide was the daughter of Casimir II the Just. It is unknown when she was born. The fact that she never married and became a nun, supports the presumption that at the time of her father's death in 1194 her future had not yet been decided. Her birth date has been placed between the late 1170s and early 1180s. By convention among the offspring of Casimir II and Helena of Znojmo she is in fifth place, after Odon (who died in infancy) and before Leszek I the White and Konrad I of Masovia.

The origin of her name is unclear. Historians have posed three theories about her name:

- She was probably named after Casimir's maternal grandmother Adelaide of Mochental, mother of Salomea of Berg. However the chronological distance between the Countess of Berg and the Piast princess was significant, and thus it might be unlikely that Casimir II named his daughter for his grandmother.
- Another possibility was that Bolesław III Wrymouth and Salomea of Berg had a daughter named Adelaide who died in infancy (and for this reason is not mentioned in sources) whose tomb would be in the countryside, and Casimir II named his daughter after her.
- She could have been named after Adelaida Zbyslava, daughter of Bolesław I the Tall, Casimir II's nephew and ally for several years. In this case, Adelaide would have been born between 1177 and 1184, when Casimir and Bolesław were allied.

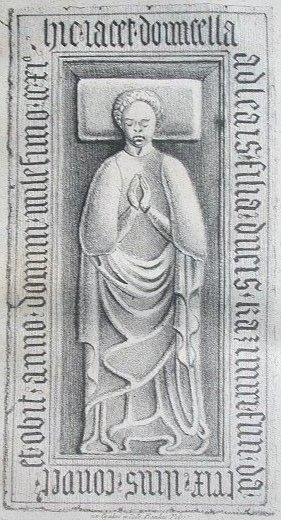
Tombstone of Adelaide at St. James Convent, Sandomierz.

Adelaide was the founder of the Convent of St. James in Sandomierz, where in 1226 thanks to Iwo Odrowąż, Bishop of Kraków, the Dominicans settled. She probably was also a nun in the Sanctuary of St. Jadwiga in Trzebnica during the rule of the first Abbess Petrissa.

She died on 8 December 1211, and was buried at the Convent of St. James.

Her Gothic tombstone was added in the late 14th or early 15th century. It includes a carved convex form of a woman wearing a long dress and coat, with her head resting on a pillow and her hands clasped in prayer. Around the figure is a Latin inscription:

hic iacet domicella adleais filia ducis kazimiri fundatrix ilius convet' et obit anno domini milesimo ccxi.

In English: Here lies Lady Adelaide, daughter of Duke Casimir, founder of the monastery and died in the year of our Lord 1211.

The inscription on the tombstone that mentioned Adelaide as the founder of the Convent was known by Jan Długosz, but was translated by the Dominicans, and this probably resulted in the error of the source.

=== The theory of a Kuyavian origin ===
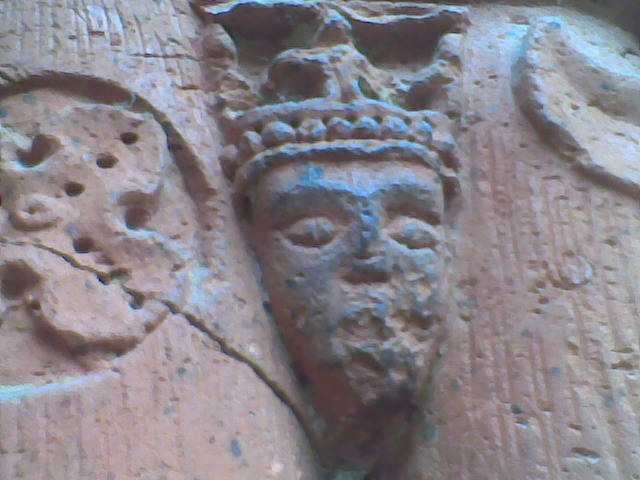
The head of Adelaide on the doors of St. James' Church in Sandomierz.

In the 19th century an incompatible theory arose regarding Adelaide's origins. It was assumed that the Piast princess buried in the Dominican Church of Sandomierz was a nun and not the founder. Since the Convent was established in 1226, it seems impossible that she could have died in 1211. It's considered unlikely that she was the daughter of Casimir II the Just, because this supposed that she took the veil at the late age of 40 or previously lived in another Monastic rule. The doubt arose about the paternity of the Casimir II made historians recognize Adelaide as the daughter of Casimir I of Kuyavia.

It was proposed that she was born shortly before 7 April 1249 from the second marriage of the Kuyavian Duke with Constance, daughter of Henry II the Pious, Duke of Wrocław. After 1278 she entered into the Dominican Convent in Sandomierz, located in the lands of her brother Leszek II the Black. The title of foundress placed in her tombstone was probably thanks to either her prestige or through the intercession of her brother Leszek II. She died on 8 December 1291 and the year of 1211 on the tombstone was explained as carelessness of the sculptor.

This interpretation, which was accepted by historians for many years, has been questioned in more recent times. As where mentioned the reports of Jan Długosz, who supposedly named Adelaide as a nun in the Dominican Convent; a further examination of this showed that a woman couldn't be a nun in a manly Order and the chronicler, indeed, never mentioned the religious Order of the princess.

Another fact which supports the view that was Adelaide was not a Kuyavian Piast was that she was not directly mentioned in any contemporary sources related to genealogy or filiation. If Adelaide was indeed the daughter of Casimir I and Constance, she would have been mentioned in the Genealogii św. Jadwigi (Genealogy of St. Jadwiga), compiled before or at the latest during 1301, but only the two sons born from the second marriage of the Kuyavian Duke - Leszek II the Black and Ziemomysł - are mentioned. In addition, Adelaide was not mentioned in the Genealogy written by the Franciscan friar Henry of Brehna, nephew of Casimir I, who would certainly never have omitted his own first cousin in the development of his work. In addition, at the time of this writing of the Genealogy, the Abbess of the Sanctuary of St. Jadwiga in Trzebnica was Constance, daughter of Ziemomysł of Kuyavia, and it would be unlikely that she would not have objected to the fact that her paternal aunt was not mentioned in this work. However, if Adelaide was born from the third marriage of Casimir I with Euphrosyne of Opole, she certainly wasn't mentioned in the Genealogii św. Jadwigi, but instead of Sandomierz, she must to be placed in a monastery located in the domains of her full-brothers.
