= Helena of Znojmo =

High Duchess consort of Poland from 1177 to 1194

Helen of Znojmo

High Duchess consort of Poland
- Reign: 1177–1194
- Born: c. 1141
- Died: 1202/1206
- Spouse: Casimir II the Just
- Issue Detail: Maria, Grand Princess of Kiev; Leszek the White; Konrad I of Masovia
- House: Přemyslid
- Father: Conrad II of Znojmo
- Mother: Maria of Serbia

Helena of Znojmo (Czech: Helena Znojemská; Polish: Helena znojemska; c. 1141–1202/1206), was a Bohemian princess, a member of the Přemyslid dynasty. She was the daughter of Duke Conrad II of Znojmo and his Serbian wife Maria (daughter of Uroš I). Helena was probably named after her maternal aunt, Queen Helena of Hungary, wife of King Béla II.

Born as princess of the Znojmo Appanage (named after its centre, the town of Znojmo in southern Moravia), she later became by marriage Duchess of Sandomierz (1173-1194), Grand Duchess of Kraków and the Seniorate Province (1177-1194), Duchess of Masovia (1186–1194), and Duchess-regent of Kraków and the Seniorate Province, Sandomierz, and Masovia on behalf of her minor sons from 1194–1198, then the latter two duchies plus Kuyavia until 1199/1200.

== Life ==
Helen married Casimir II the Just, youngest son of Bolesław III Wrymouth, probably shortly after his return from captivity, which at the latest was before 1161.

When Helen's husband Casimir II died on 1 May 1194, presumably as a result of a heart attack, he left her with their two minor sons on whose behalf she assumed the regency of Kraków and the Seniorate Province, Sandomierz, and Masovia with blessings from Fulko, bishop of Kraków, and the Kraków voivode.

Helen's regency was not an easy one, because other princes threatened her minor sons. Their own uncle Mieszko III the Old was after Kraków and the Seniorate Province. This situation between Helen and Mieszko III lasted until the Battle of Mozgawą in September 1195, in which Mieszko III was seriously injured and his son Bolesław of Kuyavia was killed. In 1198, they reached an agreement: Mieszko would take Kraków, in return for which he gave Helen and her sons Kuyavia (they retained Masovia and Sandomierz). Independent authority over the inheritance was assumed by the eldest son, Leszek the White, in 1199 or 1200. Helen's intelligence and character were recorded in the chronicle of Vincent Kadlubek, who knew the princess in person. According to him Helen was "a woman with greater wisdom than usually women have".

Helen of Znojmo died between 1202 and 1206, probably on 2 April.

== Children ==
Helen and Casimir had the following children:

1. A daughter (born before 1167), married in November 1178 to Prince Vsevolod IV of Kiev.
2. Casimir (ca. 1162 – 2 February or 1 March 1167), named after his father.
3. Bolesław (ca. 1168/1171 – 16 April 1182/1183), probably named after his paternal grandfather Bolesław III Wrymouth, although is possible that in fact was named in honour to his uncle Bolesław IV the Curly. He died accidentally, after falling from a tree. He was probably buried at Wawel Cathedral.
4. Odon (1169/1184 - died in infancy). He was probably named after either Odon of Poznań or Saint Odo of Cluny.
5. Adelaide (ca. 1177/1184 – 8 December 1211), foundress of the convent of St. Jakob in Sandomierz.
6. Leszek I the White (ca. 1184/1185 – 24 November 1227).
7. Konrad (ca. 1187/1188 – 31 August 1247).

== Sources ==
- Balcárek, Petr (2023). Byzantium in the Czech Lands (4th–16th centuries): Historical and Art Historical Perspectives. Leiden-Boston: Brill.
- Kalić, Jovanka (2016). "Grand Župan Uroš II of Rascia". Balcanica. 47: 75–96.
- Wasilewski, Tadeusz (1978). "Helena księżniczka znojemska, żona Kazimierza II Sprawedliwego: Przyczynek do dziejów stosunków polsko-czeskich w XII–XIII w." [Helen Duchess of Znojmo, a Wife of Casimir II the Just: Tribute to the History of Czech-Polish Relations in the 12th and 13th centuries]. Przegląd Historyczny (in Polish). LXIX (1). Warszawa: PWN: 115–120. ISSN 0033-2186.

Helena of Znojmo Přemyslid dynasty Born: 1141? Died: 1206?
Royal titles
Preceded by Eudokia of Kiev	High Duchess consort of Poland; 1177–1194	Succeeded by Lucia of Rügen
