= Marcinkowo Górne =

- Village
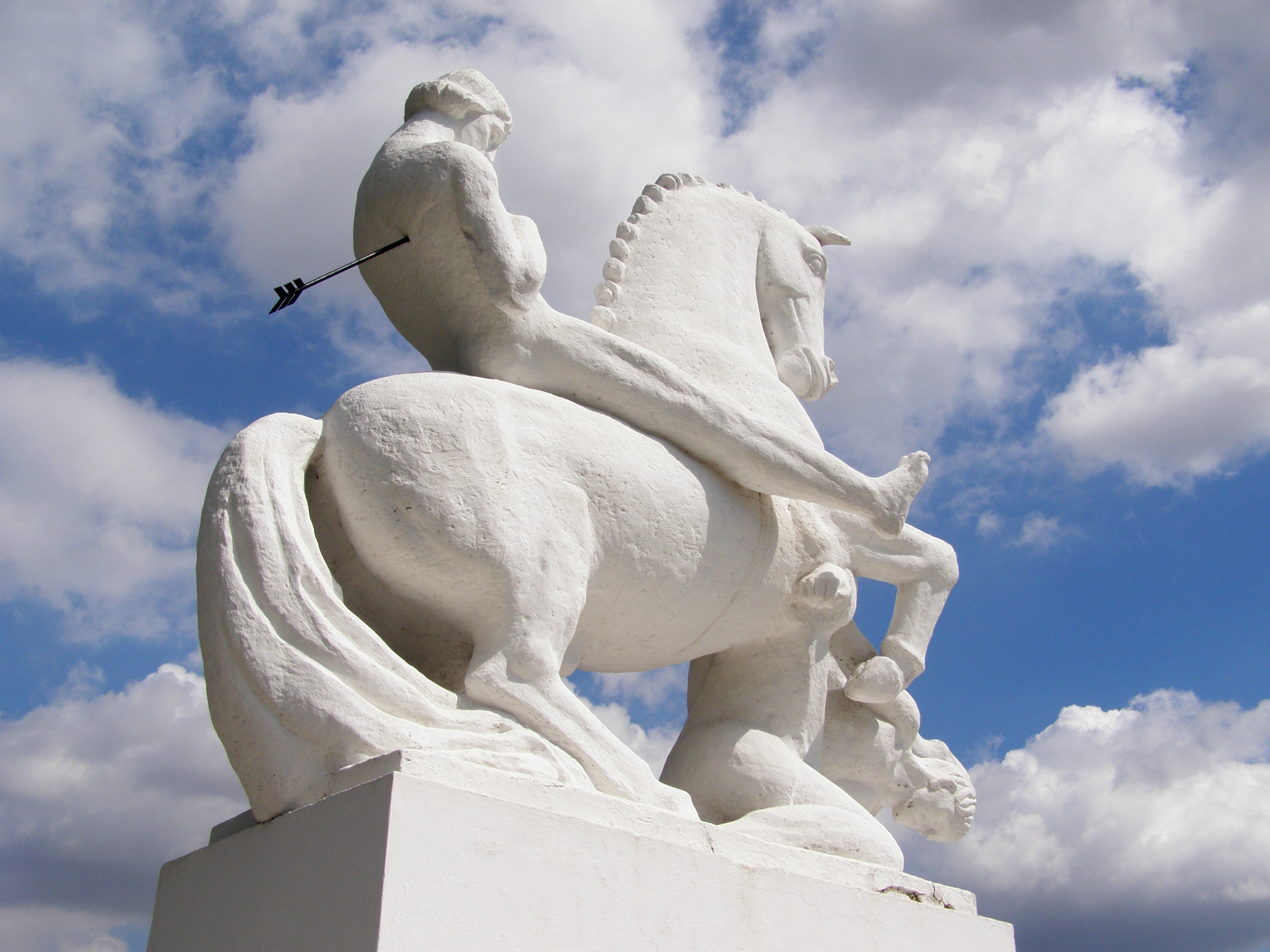

- Location within Poland
- Coordinates: 52°46′N 17°44′E
- Country: Poland
- Voivodeship: Kuyavian-Pomeranian
- County: Żnin
- Gmina: Gąsawa

Marcinkowo Górne [mart͡ɕiŋˈkɔvɔ ˈɡurnɛ] is a village in the administrative district of Gmina Gąsawa, within Żnin County, Kuyavian-Pomeranian Voivodeship, in north-central Poland.

On 24 November 1227 High Duke of Poland Leszek the White was assassinated here. This incident is commemorated with a statue of Leszek hit by an arrow.
