= Leszek I the White =

High Duke of Poland intermittently between 1194 and 1227

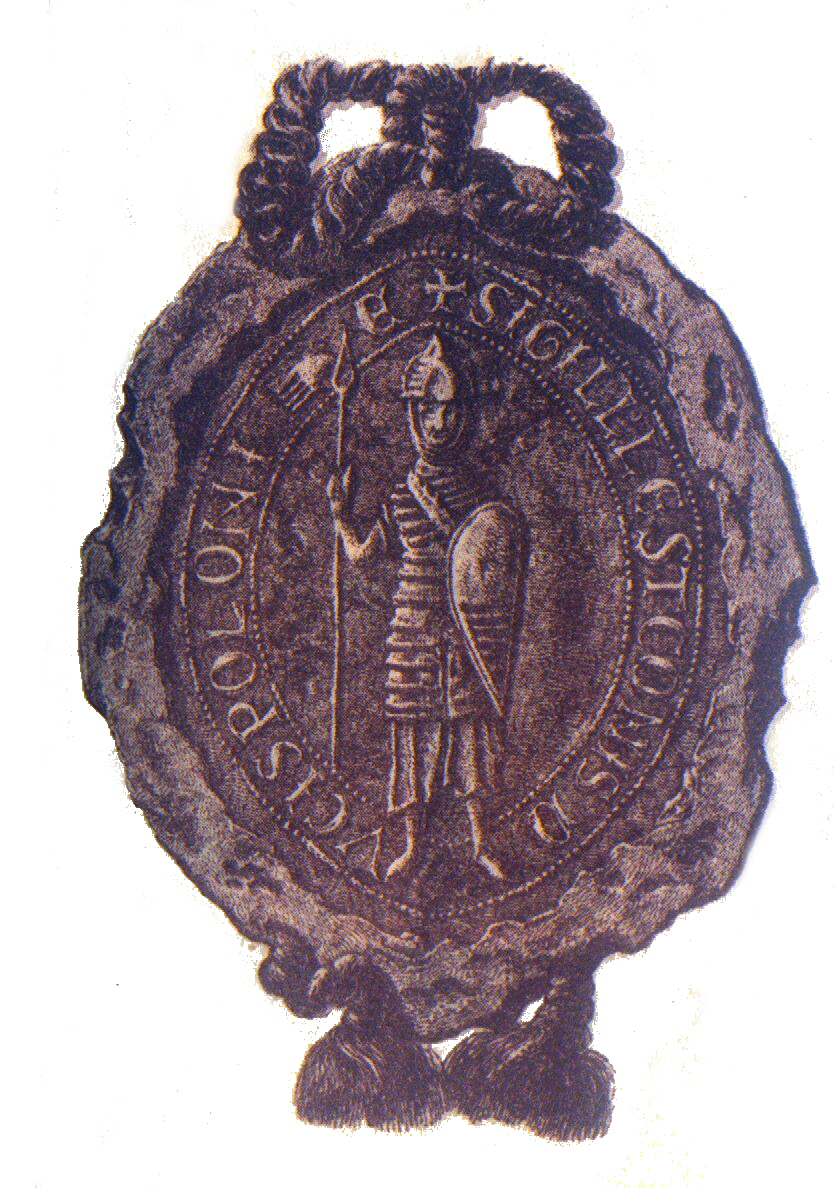
- Front side of a seal featuring the effigy of Leszek I

High Duke of Poland
- Reign: 1194 – 1198; 1199 – 1202; 1206 – 1210; 1211 – 1227
- Predecessor: Casimir II the Just
- Successor: Władysław III Spindleshanks

Duke of Sandomierz
- Reign: 1194 – 1227
- Predecessor: Casimir II the Just
- Successor: Władysław III Spindleshanks

Duke of Masovia
- Reign: 1194 – 1200
- Predecessor: Casimir the Just
- Successor: Konrad I of Masovia
- Born: c. 1184/1185
- Died: 24 November 1227 (age c. 42–43); Gąsawa, Kuyavia, Poland
- Spouse: Grzymisława of Luck
- Issue: Salomea; Bolesław the Chaste
- House: House of Piast
- Father: Casimir II the Just
- Mother: Helen of Znojmo

Leszek I the White (Polish: Leszek Biały; c. 1184/1185 – 24 November 1227) was Prince of Sandomierz and High Duke of Poland in the years 1194–1198, 1199, 1206–1210, and 1211–1227. During the early stages of his reign, his uncle Duke Mieszko III the Old and cousin Władysław III Spindleshanks, from the Greater Polish branch of the royal Piast dynasty, contested Leszek's right to be High Duke.

Leszek was the third or fourth, but eldest surviving son of Casimir II the Just and his wife Helen of Znojmo.

== Struggle for the succession ==
When Casimir II died on 5 May 1194, Leszek was only nine or ten years old. K. Jasiński, writing in 2001, puts his birth year as 1184 or 1185, while an older historiography claimed 1186 or 1187. The regency was exercised by his mother Helen, who counted on the help of Mikołaj Gryfita, wojewoda of Kraków, and Fulko, Bishop of Kraków.

However, Leszek's uncle Mieszko III the Old – who had been ruler of Kraków from 1173 to 1177 and was deposed after a national rebellion against him – refused to accept this, and with the help of powerful Lesser Poland families, decided to reconquer Kraków.

The war began in 1195. On the side of Leszek and his youngest brother Konrad fought the nobility of Kraków and Sandomierz, and the Rurikid Prince Roman of Vladimir-in-Volhynia. Mieszko III the Old was able to negotiate with his Silesian relatives Mieszko Tanglefoot, Duke of Racibórz, and his nephew Jarosław, Duke of Opole, who promised to send food to him during the campaign.

An extremely bloody battle took place on 13 September 1195 at Mozgawa near Jędrzejów. In the first phase of the battle, the Greater Poland armies – personally commanded by Mieszko III and his son Bolesław – faced the forces of wojewoda Mikołaj and Prince Roman. This battle was inconclusive and ended with the withdrawal of Mieszko III, distraught by the death of his son during the fight. The supporters of Leszek and Konrad decided not to pursue the retreating enemy and returned to Kraków, because the casualties were great and among the injured was Prince Roman. However, this was not the end of the battle, as the troops of Sandomierz led by wojewoda Goworek arrived and attacked the Silesian army of Mieszko Tanglefoot and Jarosław of Opole, who also arrived late to the battlefield. This second phase of the battle was decisively won by the Silesians, but with the escape of Mieszko III to Greater Poland, the Silesians also decided to retreat, taking with them the captured wojewoda Goworek, who regained his freedom a few months later by payment of a ransom.

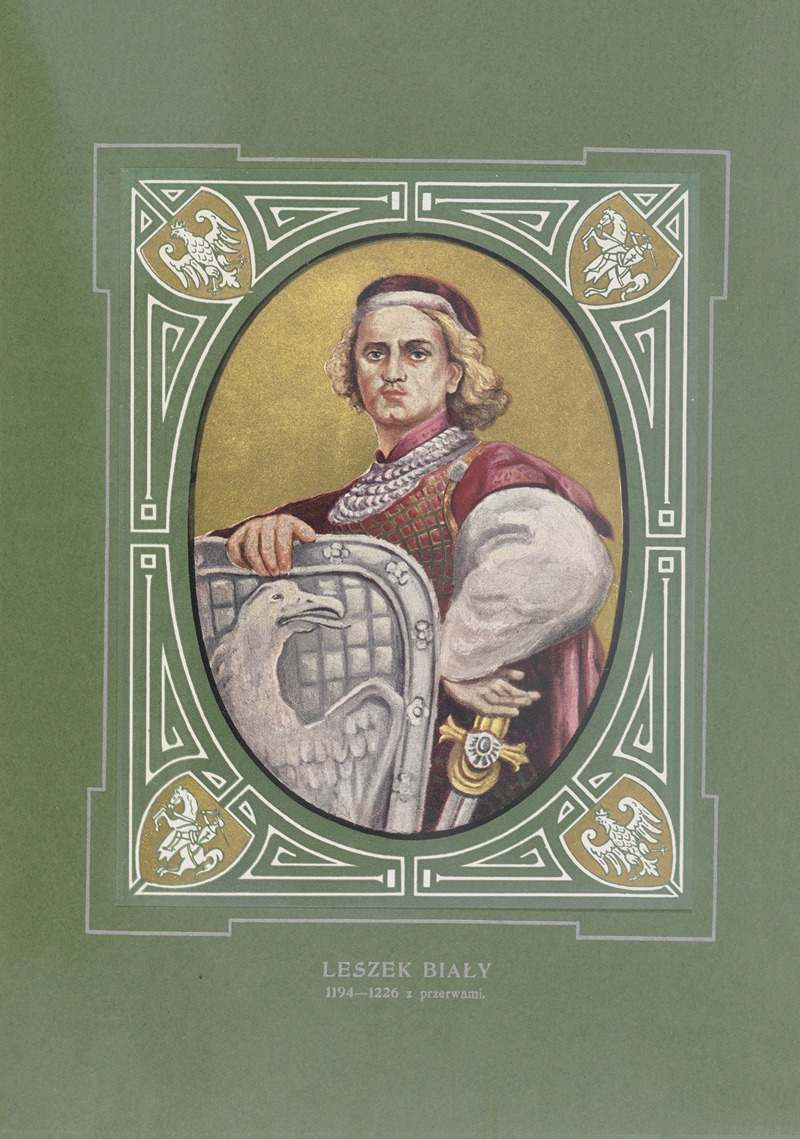
Leszek Biały (1194-1226) (1913) by Jan Matejko

The withdrawal of Mieszko III the Old during the Battle of Mozgawą allowed Leszek (or more accurately, his regents) to maintain power for the next three years. However, in 1198, Mieszko III finally regained power over the Seniorate Province through an agreement with Helen of Znojmo. On behalf of her eldest son, the Dowager Duchess and Regent formally resigned his control of Kraków in exchange for recognition of his rights over Lesser Poland and Masovia, and receipt of Kujavia (for according to historians, Mieszko III and his son Bolesław had taken over the government of Kujavia after the death of Leszek, Duke of Masovia). This time (with a short interruption in 1199), Mieszko III remained in control over Kraków until his death on 13 March 1202.

Some time earlier (ca. 1200), Leszek and Konrad, who had reached their majority and began to rule personally, decided to divide their domains. Konrad received Masovia and Kuyavia, while Leszek retained only Sandomierz, probably with the hope of eventually reconquering the Seniorate Province and the adjacent land of Sieradz-Łęczyca.

After the death of Mieszko III, the reinstatement of Leszek was proposed. His former ally, Mikołaj Gryfita, fearing his loss of political influence, demanded the dismissal of Leszek's closest collaborator, Goworek. The wojewoda of Sandomierz was ready to step down in order to obtain Kraków for his master, but Leszek, unwilling to discard him, strongly refused this request. In view of this impasse, Mikołaj Gryfita invited the youngest and only surviving son of Mieszko III, Władysław III Spindleshanks, to be the new ruler of Kraków.

It is unknown how long Władysław III ruled over Kraków. According to some historians, his reign ended a few months after the death of his father, in autumn 1202; according to others (and this version seems more likely) it lasted until 1206 or even 1210. In any case, some time after the death of Mikołaj Gryfita (also in 1202), the Kraków nobility invited Leszek to reassume the government without any conditions.

In 1207, Leszek placed his domains under the vassalage of the pope, at that time Innocent III. This put Poland clearly in the camp of pro-Papal territories in opposition to the power of the Holy Roman Emperor. After that, Leszek cooperated closely with Archbishop Henry Kietlicz in implementing the reforms of Innocent III.

== Intervention in Kievan Rus' ==
In the early years of his rule, Leszek's policy focused mainly in Kievan Rus'. In 1199 he helped Prince Roman of Vladimir-in-Volhynia with troops to reconquer the Principality of Galicia, probably in gratitude for Roman's assistance against Mieszko III at Mozgawa in 1195. This alliance ended unexpectedly in 1205, however, when Roman decided to support Władysław III Spindleshanks' effort to recover the Seniorate Province (which supports the theory that Władysław III was expelled in 1202). Roman then invaded the domains of Leszek and Konrad for unknown reasons (although historians believe that this was due to the intrigues of Władysław III), venturing deep into their territory. Both forces clashed in the Battle of Zawichost (14 October 1205), where Roman was defeated and killed.

Leszek and Konrad then became involved in the conflict associated with the succession of Roman's domains, which was further complicated by the intervention of King Andrew II of Hungary, who supported the rights of Roman's widow and children. Leszek and his brother initially led a coalition of Rurikid princes who wanted to remove Roman's children from Vladimir-in-Volhynia and Galicia. However, after some time, and in order to avoid a war with Hungary, they decided to sign a treaty. In 1206, Leszek met with Andrew II in Volhynia, and afterwards the influence of the Hungarian rulers over Vladimir-in-Volhynia and Galicia was exclusive.

Despite the agreement with the Hungarian King, the conflict continued. Shortly after, Roman's widow and her younger son Vasilko, displeased with the Hungarian rule, decided to escape to Poland, where they found refuge at Leszek's court; her eldest, Daniel had already been sent to the court of Andrew II. During their exile in Poland, they received the land of Belz.

A further confirmation of an active policy in Kievan Rus' was the marriages of Leszek and Konrad with Rurikid princesses. Leszek first married a daughter (name unknown) of Ingvar Yaroslavich, Prince of Lutsk, and then Grzymisława, perhaps a daughter of Yaroslav III Vladimirovich, Prince of Novgorod. Meanwhile, Konrad married Agafia, daughter of Svyatoslav III Igorevich, Prince of Peremyshl.

In 1210, Andrew II decided to replace the reigning prince of Vladimir-in-Volhynia with Roman's eldest son, Daniel. However, not wanting to lose his political influence, he decided to send his troops there. The expected Polish-Hungarian confrontation did not occur in the end, because Leszek was forced to have his army return after Mieszko Tanglefoot captured Kraków.

Once the situation in the Seniorate Province was pacified, Leszek returned to Vladimir-in-Volhynia and Galicia in 1212. As a result of his military actions, he took several border towns. However, in 1213, he failed to prevent the capture of Galicia by the Hungarian boyar Władysław. Although a year later, he was defeated at the Bobrka river, the danger of the zone forced the Hungarian troops to retreat. In the same year, wanting to break the difficult relations with Hungary, Leszek, under the pressure of the Kraków aristocracy gathered around the voivode Pakosław, decided to conclude a peace treaty at Spiš. According to this treaty, the government of Galicia–Volhynia was given to Andrew II's second son Coloman, who was to marry Leszek's oldest daughter Salomea. This treaty also gave Leszek territorial acquisitions in Kievan Rus' (the districts of Przemyśl and Lubaczów).

Unfortunately, this alliance with Hungary did not last, because before the end of the year, Leszek decided to support the restoration of Daniel Romanovich in Galicia when it was clear that the local nobility did not accept the rule of Prince Coloman. The ambiguous policy of the Duke of Kraków cost him in 1215 when the Hungarians, impatient with the lack of help in securing the rule of Coloman, broke the alliance. Once the situation in Kievan Rus' seemed to be calm, the Hungarians sent an army against Leszek, using his support of Daniel as the rationale. During this campaign, Leszek lost the lands of Przemyśl and Lubaczów.

After this defeat, Leszek wanted to make an alliance with Mstislav Mstislavich, Prince of Novgorod. This new political approach failed to bring Leszek any positive results, because it prompted an alliance between Daniel Romanovich and Mstislav against him. As a result, the Duke of Kraków lost a small area between the Narew and Bug rivers in 1218.

These successive failures forced Leszek to reconsider his previous alliance with Andrew II of Hungary. This time, the treaty between them was sealed with the formal marriage between their children, Coloman and Salomea. In return for his resignation over Galicia, Leszek received Volhynia in compensation, after Prince Daniel was expelled.

The expedition under the command of Andrew II and Leszek was finally organized at the end of 1219. The combination of the Polish-Hungarian forces was a success, as Coloman and Salomea were formally proclaimed rulers of Galicia. In that year, Leszek also organized an unsuccessful expedition to Vladimir-in-Volhynia. Another expedition in 1221, this time with the help of Hungary, also ended in failure. Moreover, these invasions prompted Daniel, recently reconciled with Mstislav of Novgorod, to make a retaliatory expedition that ended with the imprisonment of Coloman and Salomea and the proclamation of Mstislav as Prince of Galicia.

However, in 1223, an unexpected alliance developed between Mstislav and Andrew II regarding the succession of Galicia. It was agreed that after Mstislav's death, Galicia would be inherited by Andrew II's youngest son Andrew. This caused a further change in the political situation, as Leszek and Daniel allied against them. Mstislav conducted an expedition against Leszek in 1225 with the help of the Cuman khan Köten. This war, just like the previous ones, ended without a clear outcome despite temporary successes. Moreover, it resulted in another change of alliances in 1227 when Leszek joined with Hungary against Daniel. This was to be Leszek's last intervention in the long-running conflict with Kievan Rus'.

== Conflict with Władysław III Spindleshanks ==
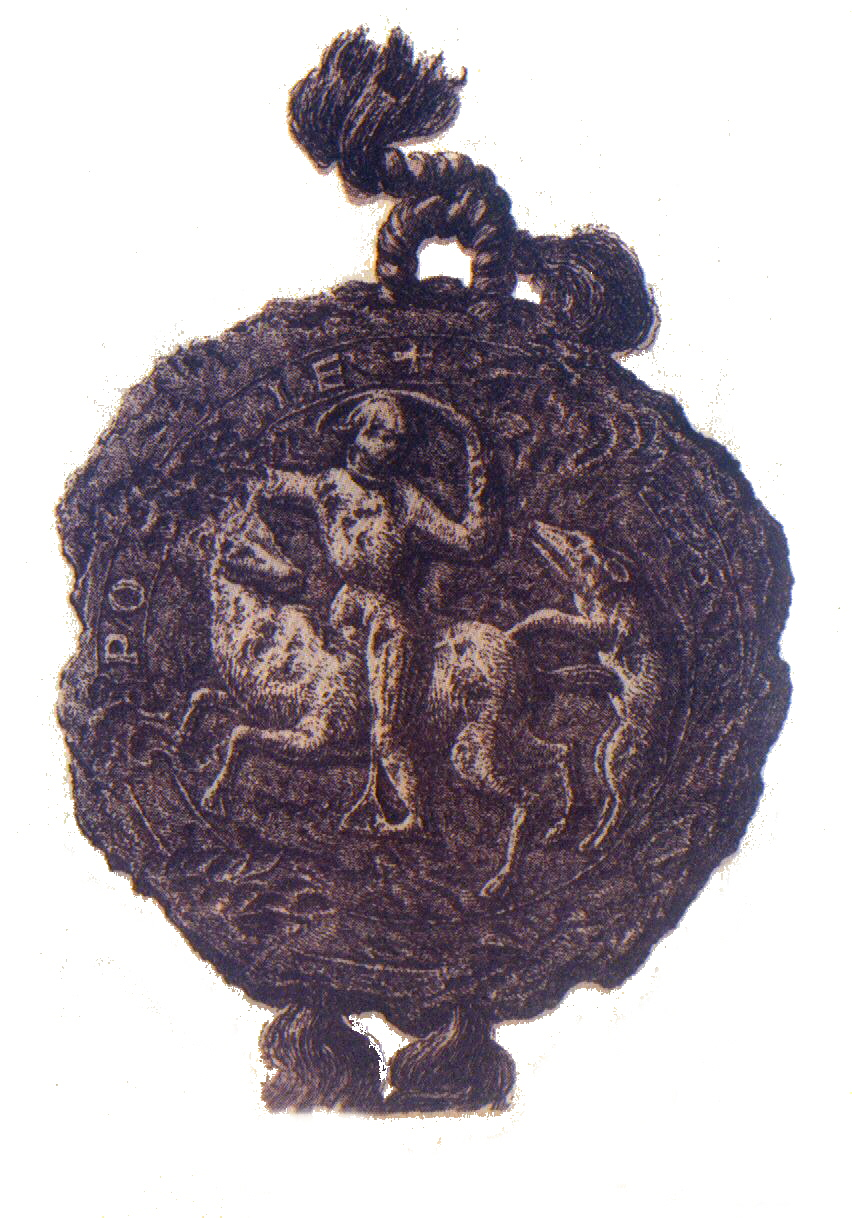
Seal of Leszek Biały (Leszek I, "the White"), back side.

The quiet government of Leszek over Kraków after the deposition of Władysław III Spindleshanks was interrupted in 1210 with his excommunication through a papal bull issued by Pope Innocent III. This development was used by Mieszko Tanglefoot, who quickly conquered Kraków and took the title of High Duke for himself. The bull was issued at the request of an anonymous Duke of Silesia, which could only have been Henry I the Bearded because Mieszko used the title of a Duke of Racibórz-Opole. The situation became quite confused, as nobody was sure who held the real power. The papal bull was a complete surprise for Leszek and the local church hierarchy, who supported him, especially since both parties, for the first time in Poland, agreed upon the choice of the new Bishop of Kraków after the death of Fulka, the chronicler Wincenty Kadłubek.

Henryk Kietlicz, Archbishop of Gniezno — who had returned from exile some time before — decided to call the Synod of Borzykowa, at which he tried to find a solution to this delicate issue. In addition to the church hierarchy, almost all of the Piast dukes participated in the convention. Leszek, wanting to regain the support of the Church and the other rulers, bestowed a Great Privilege on the clergy, which ensured the integrity of the territorial possession of the bishops. This privilege was not signed by Henry I the Bearded nor Władysław III, but they did comply with the provisions established therein. Mieszko Tanglefoot was not present in Borzykowa; with the help of the Lesser Poland family of Gryfici, he went with his army to Kraków, where the confusion among the citizens as to who was actually in charge enabled him to take the capital without a fight. This was the zenith of the success of Mieszko, as he died in May of the following year. Only then did Archbishop Kietlicz manage to make an appeal to Rome in order to obtain the reversal of the Bull. Henry I, although he was now the oldest Junior Duke, directed his attention to the German invasions, to Lubusz. Leszek returned to Kraków without any major difficulties.

Another result of the close cooperation between the Piasts and the Church was the synod of Wolbórz, where Archbishop Kietlicz obtained additional privileges for the Church. The good political relationship between Leszek and Archbishop Ketlicz ended in 1216, when the Archbishop lost the favor of Rome after the death of Pope Innocent III and was forced to end his political influence.

== Christianisation of Prussia ==
Another important direction of Leszek's policy was the management of Pomerania and the Christianisation of Prussia. Already in 1212, Leszek and his brother Konrad had a meeting in Mąkolno with Mestwin I of Pomerelia for the purpose of arranging a Christian mission that began only four years later when a bishop was sent, but without results.

However, the idea of Christianisation continued. Henry I the Bearded soon became interested in helping, and with him, Władysław III Spindleshanks. In 1217, Leszek and Henry I arranged a meeting at Danków. A year later, Leszek met with Henry I and Władysław III at Sądowel, where an alliance between the three was concluded. Moreover, a treaty of mutual inheritance between Leszek and Władysław III was signed, wherein Leszek, as the younger prince, had a better chance to inherit. This treaty also virtually disinherited Władysław Odonic, Władysław III's nephew and closest male relative. The alliance agreement with Henry I and Władysław III enabled Leszek to adopt the title of dux Poloniae or dux totius Poloniae since 1218.

In their common desire to begin the Christianisation of Prussia, Leszek, Henry I, and Władysław III were soon joined in their efforts by Leszek's brother Konrad I of Masovia and Swietopelk II, Duke of Pomerelia. It was soon realized, however, that Swietopelk's participation in this project was only a cover, as his main goal was to restore the political independence of his domains.

When Pope Innocent III requested of Leszek Polish participation in a Crusade, Leszek answered in a long letter that "neither he nor any self-respecting Polish knight could be induced to go to the Holy Land, where, they had been informed, there was no wine, mead, or even beer to be had".

Initially, an attempt was made to convert the Prussians by peaceful means through special trading centers in which the pagans would become acquainted with the Christians. In the end, however, after not seeing much progress, it was decided that there should be a military expedition, which took place in 1222. However, the whole enterprise soon failed, especially when Swietopelk II withdrew his support mid-crusade. Swietopelk also gave refuge at his court to Władysław Odonic, who began his fight against his uncle Władysław III.

To cope with a challenge from the Prussians, the Piast rulers decided to create a "Knight Guard" (pl: stróże rycerskie) to protect their frontiers, for which knights from all of their domains were required to participate. But the concept of the Knight Guard collapsed by 1224 as a result of the defeat of the Lesser Poland knights, who suffered a surprise attack from the Prussians. The defeat and slaughter contributed significantly to the already cowardly attitude of the command of the Guard, a member of the Gryfici family, who was punished with exile.

In 1225, unhappy with this turn of events, the Gryfici conspired against Leszek and invited Henry I the Bearded to take the throne of Kraków, who, for unknown reasons, broke his previous alliance and, using Leszek's involvement in Kievan Rus' affairs, appeared near Kraków. The war between Leszek and Henry I was preempted because of an attack on Lubusz by the Landgrave Louis IV of Thuringia, which forced Henry I to retreat. Before he could leave Lesser Poland, his troops had wanted a clash with the forces of Leszek and Konrad at the Dłubnia River. Such a battle did not occur, however, because the opponents were able to conclude an agreement. It was recognised, though, that a return to the previous alliance and close cooperation that lasted from 1217 to 1224 would no longer be possible.

New complications occurred in 1227. In Greater Poland, Władysław III Spindleshanks was unable to deal with his nephew, Władysław Odonic. Leszek was personally interested in this conflict, as he still hoped to inherit the domains of the childless Władysław III. For unknown reasons, at some point, Władysław Odonic lost the support of Swietopelk II, and thus, he could not be sure of a victory. Therefore, it was unsurprising that both parties sought to end the conflict. Another problem that Leszek wanted to solve was the issue of the dangerous independent behavior of the Pomerelian Duke.

== Assassination ==
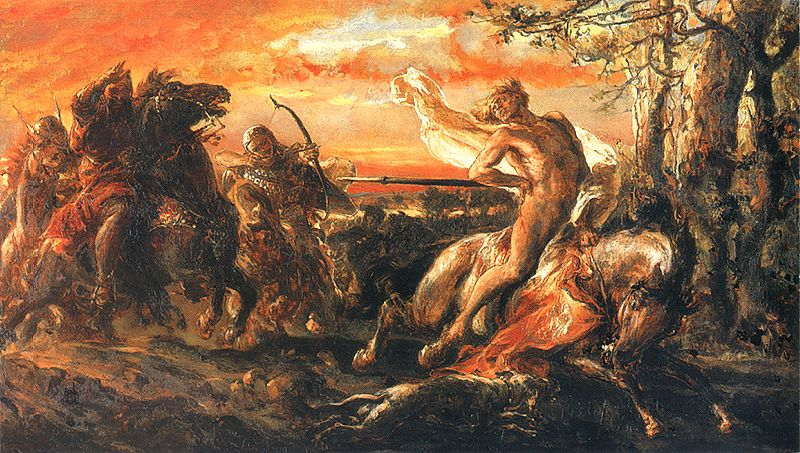
The Death of Leszek the White by Jan Matejko (1880)

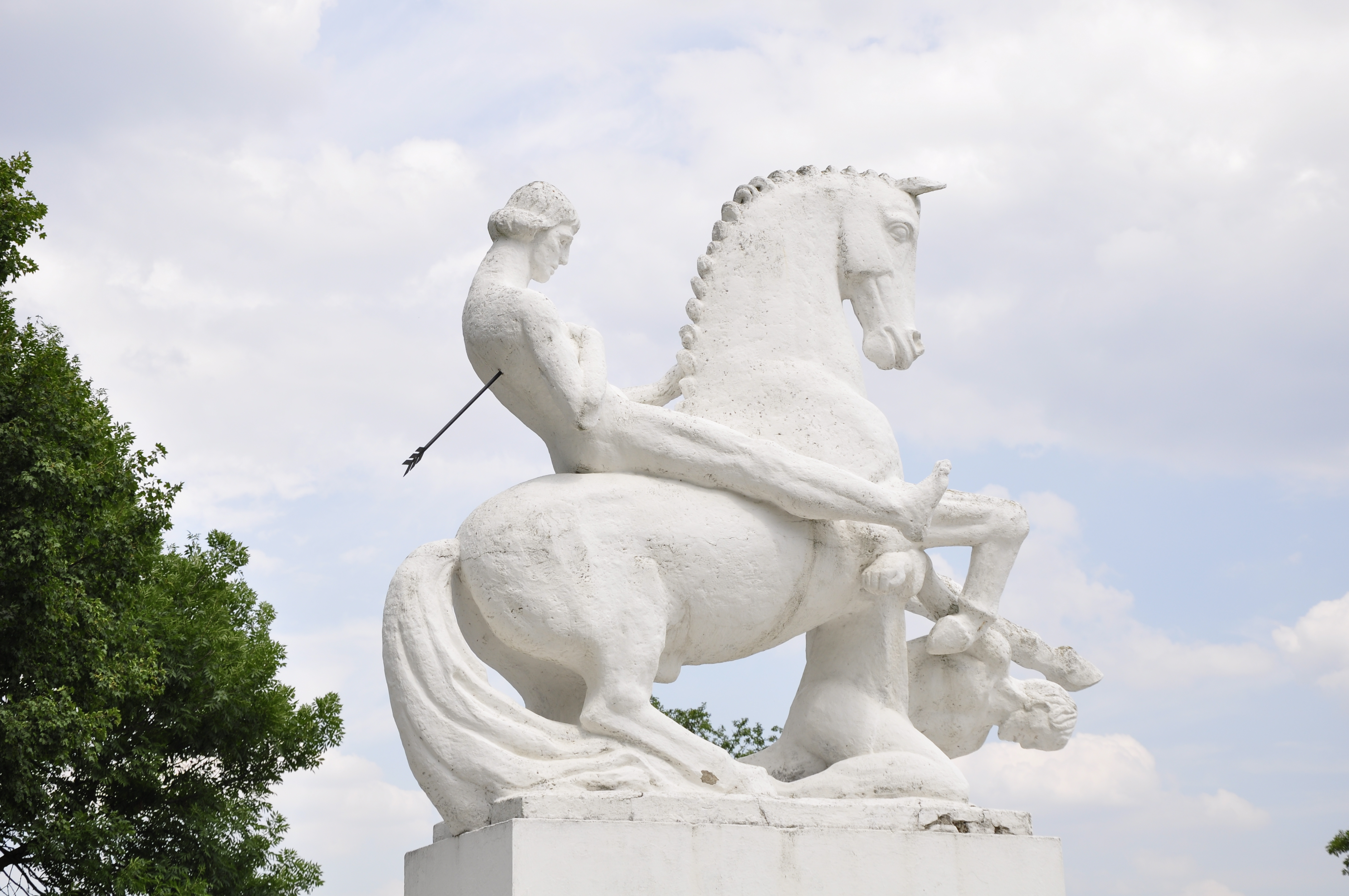
Statue of Leszek in Marcinkowo Górne at the site of his assassination

A meeting of Polish Dukes was organized in the district of Gąsawa on the border of Kuyavia and Greater Poland. Held in November 1227, it was attended by Leszek, Władysław Odonic, Henry I the Bearded, and Konrad I of Masovia - for unknown reasons, one of the most interested, Władysław III Spindleshanks, did not attend the meeting. The content of the talks was most likely the conduct of Świętopełk II of Pomerelia. On the morning of 24 November, the princes were attacked while they were bathing. Henry was seriously wounded, but his life was saved by his faithful knight, Peregrinus of Wiesenburg, who covered him with his own body. Leszek managed to escape half-naked on his horse to the nearby village of Marcinkowo, but the assassins caught up to him and killed him. The attackers have been postulated to be men of either Władysław Odonic or Świętopełk II, or some conspiracy involving both parties. Leszek's body was transported to Kraków and buried in Wawel Cathedral on or before 6 December 1227.

The death of Leszek the White fundamentally changed the political situation in Poland. Despite his turbulent government, Leszek was the Duke of Kraków, universally recognized by all the Polish princes. Świętopełk II declared himself independent from Polish vassalship upon Leszek's death. Leszek's son Bolesław V was only one year old upon his father's death, and so the rule over Kraków and Lesser Poland was contested between Leszek's brother Konrad I and Władysław III Spindleshanks, who was his heir according to the treaty of mutual inheritance made in 1217. Eventually, Duke Henry I the Bearded of Silesia prevailed as High Duke in 1232.

== Marriage and issue ==
Older historiography noted that Leszek married only once, to Grzymisława, daughter of Ingvar Yaroslavich, Prince of Lutsk in 1207. However, modern research now considers that he was married twice, firstly in 1207 or 1208 to a daughter of Prince Ingvar, whose name is unknown, and after her repudiation, in 1210 or 1211 to Grzymisława, who was possibly a daughter of Yaroslav IV Vladimirovich, Prince of Novgorod. From his marriage to Grzymisława, Leszek had two children:

- Salomea (1211/12 – 17 November 1268), married in 1215 to Prince Coloman, son of King Andrew II of Hungary. They were the intended rulers of Galicia–Volhynia, but as noted above, these plans failed and they never really established rule in that area. After her husband's death (1241), she became a Poor Clare nun at Zawichost and Skała;
- Bolesław V the Chaste (21 June 1226 – 7 December 1279), who assumed the throne of Poland at Kraków in 1243.

== Church foundations ==
In 1216, Leszek founded the Church of Saint Wenceslaus (pl: Kościół św. Wacława) in the city of Radom, which was further provided for by his son Bolesław V the Chaste, and in 1440 was extended and partially rebuilt in the Gothic style.

== Legacy ==
He is rarely numbered (Leszek I), and his name is infrequently spelled Leszko or Lesco.

An opera about him, Leszek Biały, was written by Józef Elsner and performed in 1809.

== Bibliography ==
- Leszek Biały i jego czasy. Wydaw. Dolnośląskie. 2002. ISBN 978-83-7023-935-0.
- Nora Berend; Przemysław Urbańczyk; Przemysław Wiszewski (19 December 2013). Central Europe in the High Middle Ages: Bohemia, Hungary and Poland, c. 900 – c. 1300. Cambridge University Press. ISBN 978-0-521-78156-5.

Leszek I the White House of Piast Born: ~1186 Died: 24 November 1227
Preceded by Casimir II the Just	Duke of Sandomierz; 1194 – 1227	Succeeded by Bolesław V the Chaste
Preceded by Casimir II the Just	Duke of Masovia; 1194 – 1200	Succeeded by Konrad I
Preceded by Casimir II the Just	High Duke of Poland; 1194 – 1198	Succeeded by Mieszko III the Old
Preceded by Mieszko III the Old	High Duke of Poland; 1199 – 1202	Succeeded by Władysław III Spindleshanks
Preceded by Władysław III Spindleshanks	High Duke of Poland; 1206 – 1210	Succeeded by Mieszko IV Tanglefoot
Preceded by Mieszko IV Tanglefoot	High Duke of Poland; 1211 – 1227	Succeeded by Władysław III Spindleshanks
