= Subdivisions of the Kingdom of Poland =

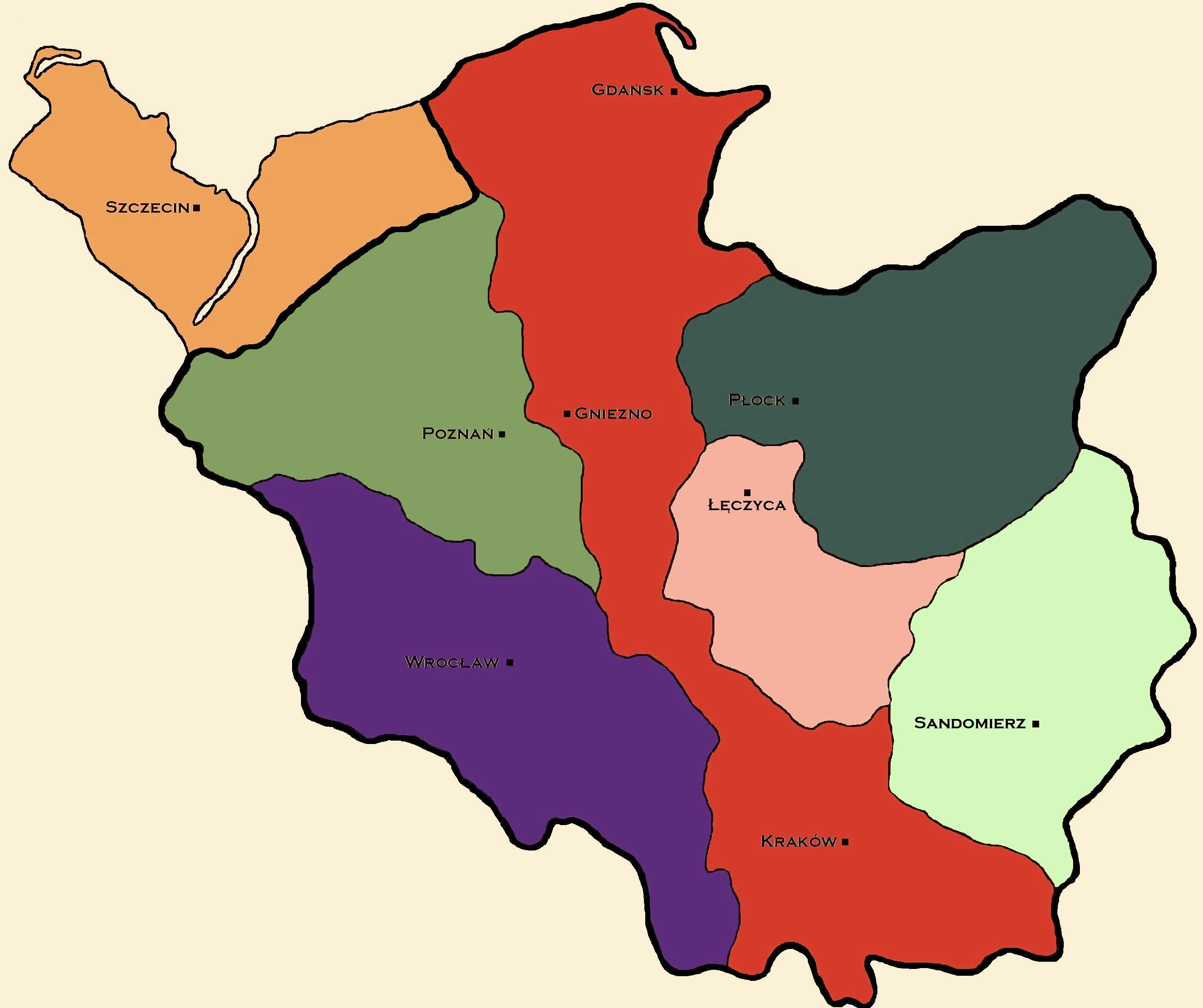
Fragmentation of Poland between the sons of Bolesław: The Seniorate Province, composed of the Eastern Greater Poland, Lesser Poland, Western Kuyavia, Wieluń Land Silesian Province of Władysław II Masovian Province of Bolesław IV composed of Masovia and Eastern Kuyavia Greater Poland Province of Mieszko III composed of Western Great Poland Sandomir Province of Henryk Łęczyca Province of Bolesław's widow, Salomea, composed of Łęczyca Land and Sieradz Land - to revert to seniorate province upon her death Pomeranian vassals of the ruler of the seniorate province

Subdivisions of the Kingdom of Poland evolved over several centuries as the fortunes of the several entities known as the Kingdom of Poland ebbed and flowed.

The early Kingdom of Poland was split in the 11th century by the Testament of Bolesław III Krzywousty into several provinces (prowincja). The 14th century Wiślica Statutes and Statutes of Casimir the Great also used the term province. Eventually, during the unification of Poland after the fragmentation, the provinces - some of them for a period known as duchies (e.g. the Duchy of Masovia) - became known as lands (ziemia).

According to the 15th century Annales seu cronicae incliti Regni Poloniae ("Annals or chronicles of the famous Kingdom of Poland") of Jan Długosz, the Kingdom of Poland was divided into following lands:

- ziemia krakowska (Latin Terra Cracoviensis)
- ziemia poznańska (lat. Terra Posnaniensis)
- ziemia sandomierska (lat. Terra Sandomiriensis)
- ziemia kaliska (lat. Terra Calisiensis)
- ziemia lwowska (lat. Terra Leopoliensis)
- ziemia sieradzka (lat. Terra Siradiensis)
- ziemia lubelska (lat. Terra Lubliniensis)
- ziemia łęczycka (lat. Terra Lanciciensis)
- ziemia przemyska (lat. Terra Premisliensis)
- ziemia bełska (lat. Terra Belzensis)
- ziemia kujawska (lat. Terra Cuyaviensis)
- ziemia chełmska (lat. Terra Chelmensis)
- ziemia pomorska (lat. Terra Pomoranie)
- ziemia chełmińska (lat. Terra Culmensis)
- ziemia michałowska (lat. Terra Michaloviensis)
- ziemia halicka (lat. Terra Halicensis)
- ziemia dobrzyńska (lat. Terra Dobriensis)
- ziemia podolska (lat. Podolia)
- ziemia wieluńska (lat. Terra Wyelunensis)

Most of these administrative regions (ziemia) in turn were transformed into voivodeships (województwo) around the 14th and 15th centuries (see voivodeships of Poland).

The administrative division became more clear in the Crown of the Polish Kingdom (see also Administrative division of the Polish–Lithuanian Commonwealth).

== See also ==
- Kingdom of Poland (1025–1385)
- Kingdom of Poland (1385–1569)
