= Duchy of Wiślica =

Medieval duchy in Poland

Duchy of Wiślica Księstwo wiślickie (Polish) Ducatus Visliciensis (Latin)
- 1166–1173; 1230–c. 1234
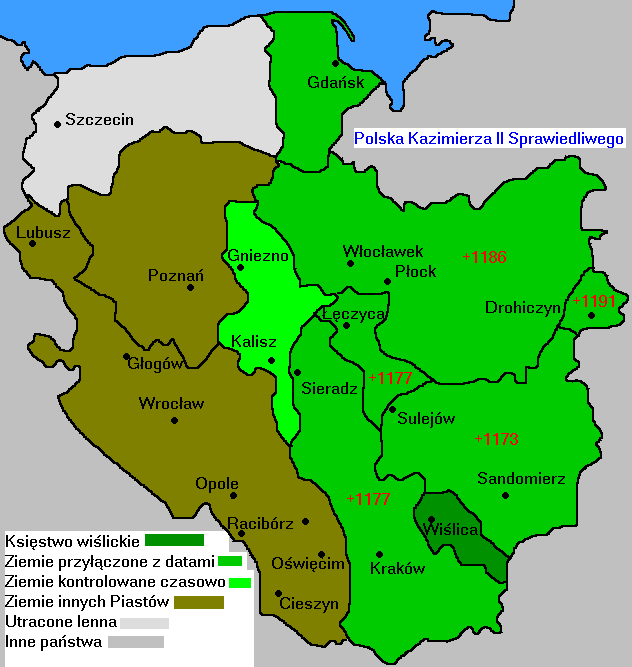
- Duchy of Wiślica in 1166 within the Kingdom of Poland
- Status: Fiefdom of Kingdom of Poland
- Capital: Wiślica
- Official languages: Polish, Latin
- Religion: Roman Catholic
- Government: District principality
- Duke
  - 1166–1173: Casimir II the Just
  - 1230–c. 1234: Bolesław V the Chaste (de jure); Grzymisława of Łuck (regent)
- Historical era: High Middle Ages
  - Established: 1166
  - Incorporation into Duchy of Sandomierz: 1173
  - Reestablishment of the duchy: 1230
  - Last known mention of the duchy in the records: 1234
  - Destruction of Wiślica during First Mongol invasion of Poland: 1241
Preceded by	Succeeded by
Duchy of Sandomierz	Duchy of Sandomierz
- Today part of: Poland

The Duchy of Wiślica (Note: Polish: Księstwo wiślickie; Latin: Ducatus Vislicensis, Ducatus Wisliciensis) was a district principality and a fiefdom within the Kingdom of Poland. It was formed in 1166 from the territories of the Duchy of Sandomierz, following its fragmentation onto three parts. The state was ruled by Casimir II the Just, and it existed until 1173, when Casimir had assumed the throne of the Duchy of Sandomierz, uniting two states together. Its capital was Wiślica and it was located in the southern Sandomierz Land in the southeastern corner of the Kingdom of Poland. The state was later shortly reestablished in 1230 by Grzymisława of Łuck who ruled it as a regent in the name of her son, Bolesław V the Chaste. In 1234, they had become rulers of the whole Duchy of Sandomierz, with that year being the last mention of the duchy in the documents.

== History ==
=== Reign of Casimir II the Just ===
Most likely before 1166, and before his war expedition to Prussia, Henry of Sandomierz, duke of Duchy of Sandomierz, had appointed in his will Casimir II the Just as his successor as the Duke of Sandomierz. After his death in the battle against Prussians, Casimir's brothers, Bolesław IV the Curly and Mieszko III the Old, had intervened in the succession, separating the duchy into 3 parts, as opposed to the whole state being ruled by Casimir himself. Bolesław IV had become the ruler of the Duchy of Sandomierz, while Mieszko III was given closely unknown territory of the duchy. Casimir II was given the smallest part of the state, forming the Duchy of Wiślica. The capital of the state was Wiślica and the duchy had stretched from Małogoszcz on the north to Połaniec on the south.

In 1167, with the decreasing support to the rule Bolesław IV the Curly, the rebellion was organized against him. According to most historians, the reason for the rebellion was the succession to the throne of Sandomierz as well as the defeat of his expedition against Prussians, which, according to Wincenty Kadłubek, had generated dissatisfaction among the magnates. According to him, the rebellion was organized by Jaksa Gryfita and Świętosław Piotrowic, who had encouraged Casimir II to rebel together with them. Under the pressure of the rebellion, Bolesław IV had given lands to his brothers.

Bolesław IV died in 1173 was succeeded as Duke of Sandomierz by his brother, Mieszko III the Old. Mieszko decided to give the entire duchy to Casimir, who, by becoming the duke had united the Duchy of Sandomierz and incorporated Duchy of Wiślica into it. The city of Wiślica itself had become the co-capital of the Duchy of Sandomierz.

=== Regency rule of Grzymisława of Łuck ===
In 1229, after the unsuccessful fight for the throne succession of duchies of Kraków and Sandomierz against Henry the Bearded, Grzymisława of Łuck together with her son, Bolesław V the Chaste, had retreated to Wiślica. Year later, 4 years old Bolesław was crowned the duke of reestablished Duchy of Wiślica, with Grzymisława ruling the state as a regent. In 1234, Grzymisława had recognised Henry as the ruler of Duchy of Kraków in exchange for the rule of Duchy of Sandomierz. 1234 remains the last mention of Duchy of Wiślica in the documents.

In 1241, the town of Wiślica got destroyed and burned down during the First Mongol invasion of Poland.

== List of rulers ==
- Casimir II the Just (1166–1173)
- Bolesław V the Chaste (Grzymisława of Łuck as regent) (1230–c. 1234)

== Bibliography ==
- Wincenty Kadłubek. Kronika polska. translation and development by Brygida Kürbis. Wrocław. 1992.
- Roman Grodecki, Stanisław Zachorowski, Jan Dąbrowski. Dzieje Polski średniowiecznej, vol. 1. Kraków. 2011.
- Magdalena Biniaś-Szkopek. Bolesław Kędzierzawy. Poznań. 2014.
