= Administrative divisions of Poland =

The administrative division of Poland since 1999 has been based on three levels of subdivision. The territory of Poland is divided into voivodeships (provinces); these are further divided into powiats (counties or districts), and these in turn are divided into gminas (communes or municipalities). Major cities normally have the status of both gmina and powiat. Poland currently has 16 voivodeships, 380 powiats (including 66 cities with powiat status), and 2,479 gminas.

The current system was introduced pursuant to a series of acts passed by the Polish parliament in 1998, and came into effect on 1 January 1999. Between 1975 and 1998 there had been 49 smaller "voivodeships" and no powiats (see subdivisions of the Polish People's Republic). The reform created 16 larger voivodeships (largely based on and named after historical regions) and reintroduced powiats.

The boundaries of the voivodeships do not always reflect the historical borders of Polish regions. Around half of the Silesian Voivodeship belongs to the historical province of Lesser Poland. Similarly, the area around Radom, which historically is part of Lesser Poland, is located in the Masovian Voivodeship. Also, the Pomeranian Voivodeship includes only the eastern extreme of historical Pomerania, as the western part is in Germany and the eastern border has shifted again and again.

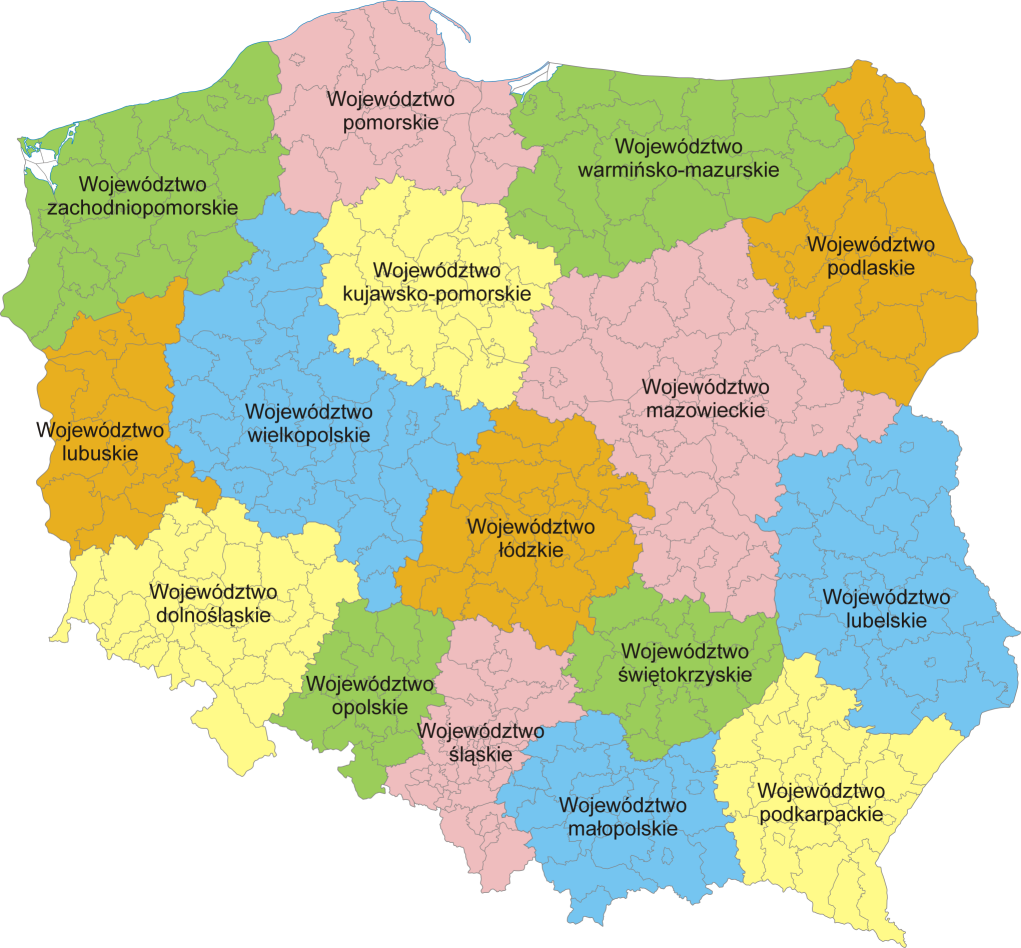
Division of Poland into voivodeships and powiats (2007)

== Voivodeships ==
Poland is currently divided into 16 provinces known as voivodeships (Polish: województwa, singular województwo). Legally they are called "I tier units" (jednostki I stopnia). Administrative authority at voivodeship level is shared between a central government-appointed governor, called the voivode (usually a political appointee), an elected assembly called the sejmik, and an executive board (zarząd województwa) chosen by that assembly. The leader of that executive is called the marszałek.

#	Flag	Emblem	Voivodeship	Polish name	Capital city (cities)
1			Greater Poland	wielkopolskie	Poznań
2			Kuyavia–Pomerania	kujawsko-pomorskie	Bydgoszcz and Toruń
3			Lesser Poland	małopolskie	Kraków
4			Łódź	łódzkie	Łódź
5			Lower Silesia	dolnośląskie	Wrocław
6			Lublin	lubelskie	Lublin
7			Lubusz	lubuskie	Gorzów Wielkopolski and Zielona Góra
8			Masovia	mazowieckie	Warsaw
9			Opole	opolskie	Opole
10			Podlaskie	podlaskie	Białystok
11			Pomerania	pomorskie	Gdańsk
12			Silesia	śląskie	Katowice
13			Podkarpackie	podkarpackie	Rzeszów
14			Świętokrzyskie	świętokrzyskie	Kielce
15			Warmia–Masuria	warmińsko-mazurskie	Olsztyn
16			West Pomerania	zachodniopomorskie	Szczecin

== Powiats ==
Each voivodeship is divided into a number of smaller entities known as powiats (counties), which are legally "II tier units" (jednostki II stopnia). The number of powiats per voivodeship ranges from 12 (Opole Voivodeship) to 42 (Masovian Voivodeship). They include two types of administrative divisions:

- 314 powiats proper (known as land counties, Polish powiaty ziemskie). Land counties have an elected council (rada powiatu), which elects an executive board (zarząd powiatu) headed by the starosta.
- 66 cities with powiat status (city counties, Polish powiaty grodzkie or more formally miasta na prawach powiatu). In city counties the functions of these institutions are performed by the city's own council (rada miejska, rada miasta) and directly elected mayor (prezydent). The administration of such a city functions both as a powiat and a municipality.

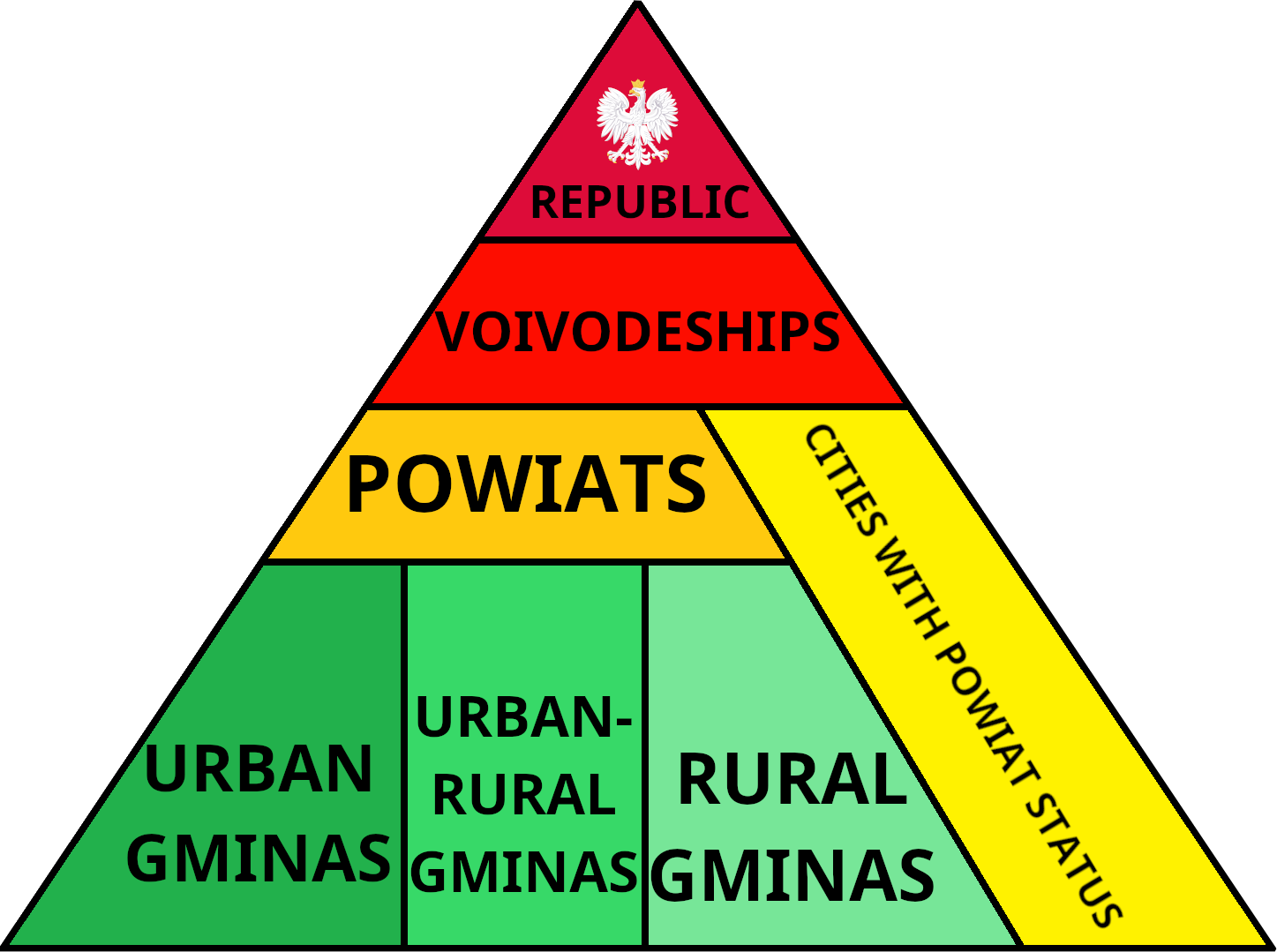
Tier units of the administrative division in Poland.

== Gminas ==
The "III tier units" (jednostki III stopnia) are 2477 gminas (also called commune or municipality). A powiat is typically divided into a number of gminas (between 3 and 19), although the city counties constitute single gminas. A gmina has an elected council as well as a directly elected mayor (known as prezydent in large towns, burmistrz in most urban and urban-rural gminas, and wójt in rural gminas). A gmina may be classed as:

- 302 urban municipalities (gmina miejska, consisting of a town (miasto)),
- 642 urban-rural municipalities (gmina miejsko-wiejska, consisting of a town (miasto) together with its surrounding villages (wieś) and the surrounding countryside),
- 1533 village or rural municipalities (gmina wiejska, not containing a town). 158 of them are called related or connected municipalities (gmina obwarzankowa). In this case the rural municipality does not contain a town, but its administration itself is located in a city or a town outside of its territory. 14 of these gminas have their administration located in a city with powiat status, the rest are in urban municipalities. The administrative category of gmina obwarzankowa was introduced in 2013 to deal with the budgetary disparity in the cases, in which the majority of the inhabitants of a rural municipality work in and use the social services of a city or a town nearby, but due to their registered address their taxes are allocated to their rural municipality of residence. In essence the gmina obwarzankowa is a rural territory closely connected to an urban territory and as such the two municipal administrations work in close administrative and budgetary coordination.

== Smaller units ==
Gminas are generally sub-divided into smaller units, called osiedle or dzielnica in towns, and sołectwo in rural areas. However, these units are of lesser importance and are subordinate in status to the gmina.

== Historical subdivisions ==
Polish territory has been subject to significant changes over the course of Polish history. Therefore, the modern Polish administrative division, while on some levels similar to some historical ones, is quite different from others. Historical Polish administrative divisions can be divided into the following periods:

- before 1569: Subdivisions of the Kingdom of Poland
- 1569–1795: Subdivisions of the Polish–Lithuanian Commonwealth
- 1795–1807: Subdivisions of the Polish–Lithuanian territories following the partitions

- 1795–1919: Subdivisions of the Kingdom of Galicia and Lodomeria
- 1807–1815: Subdivisions of the Duchy of Warsaw
- 1815–1914: Subdivisions of Congress Poland
- 1815–1848: Grand Duchy of Posen
- 1848–1919: Province of Posen

- 1914–1919: Subdivisions of Polish territories during World War I

- 1922–1938: Posen–West Prussia

- 1918–1939: Subdivisions of the Second Polish Republic
- 1939–1945: Subdivisions of Polish territories during World War II
- 1945–1999: Subdivisions of the Polish People's Republic
- since 1999: see main article above
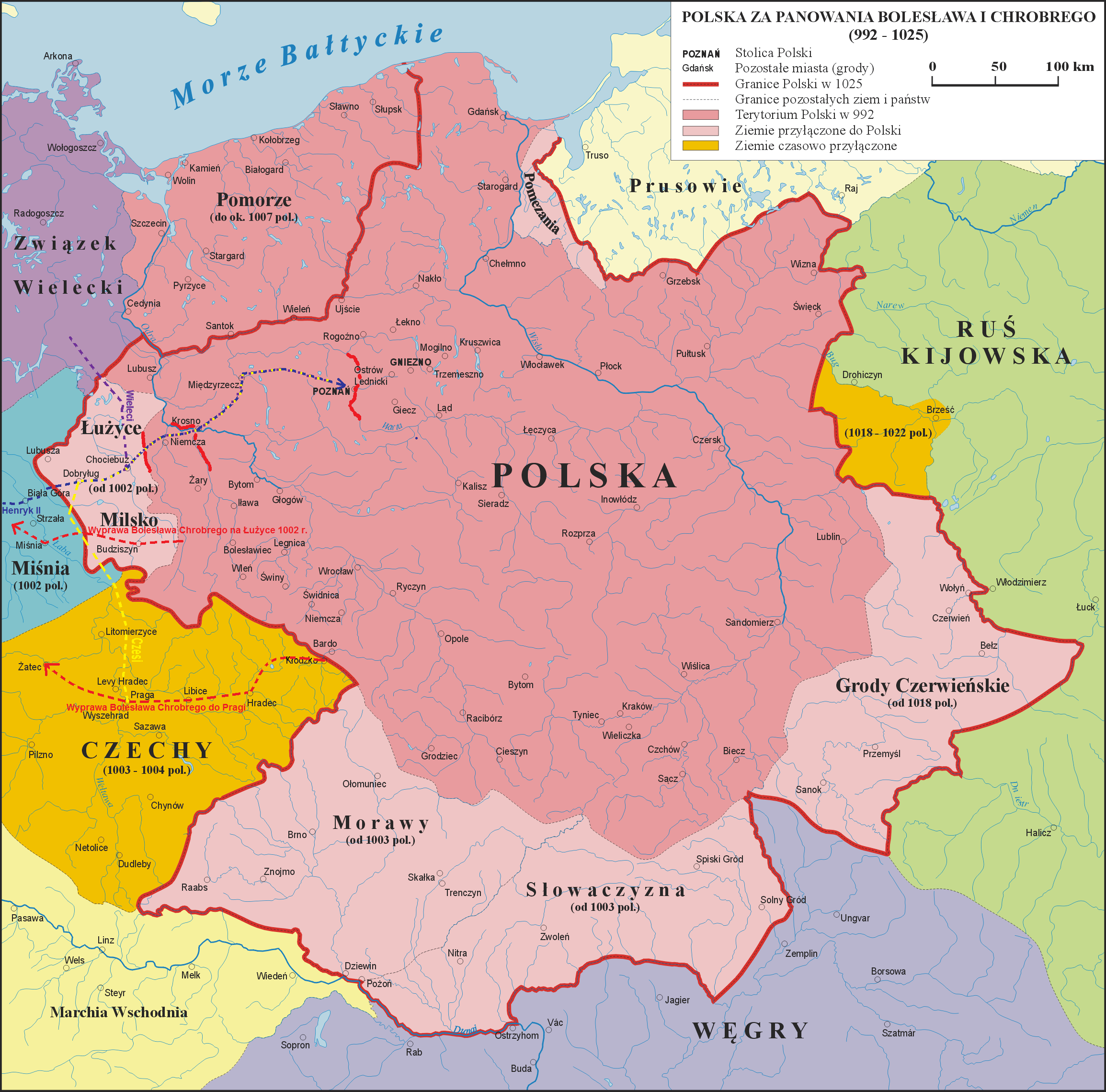
Kingdom of Poland (1025–1385)

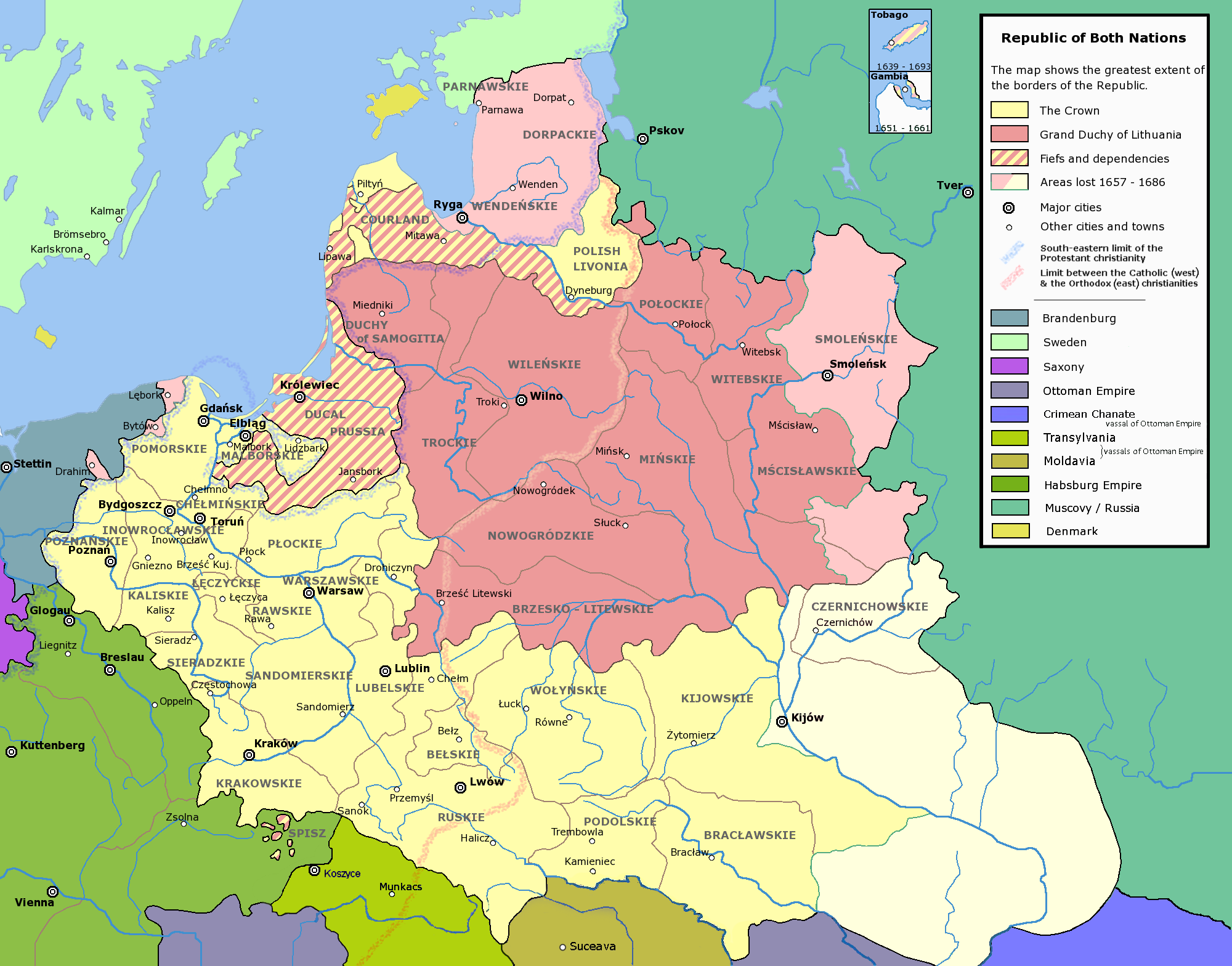
Map showing voivodeships of the Polish–Lithuanian Commonwealth of the Two Nations (1569–1795)

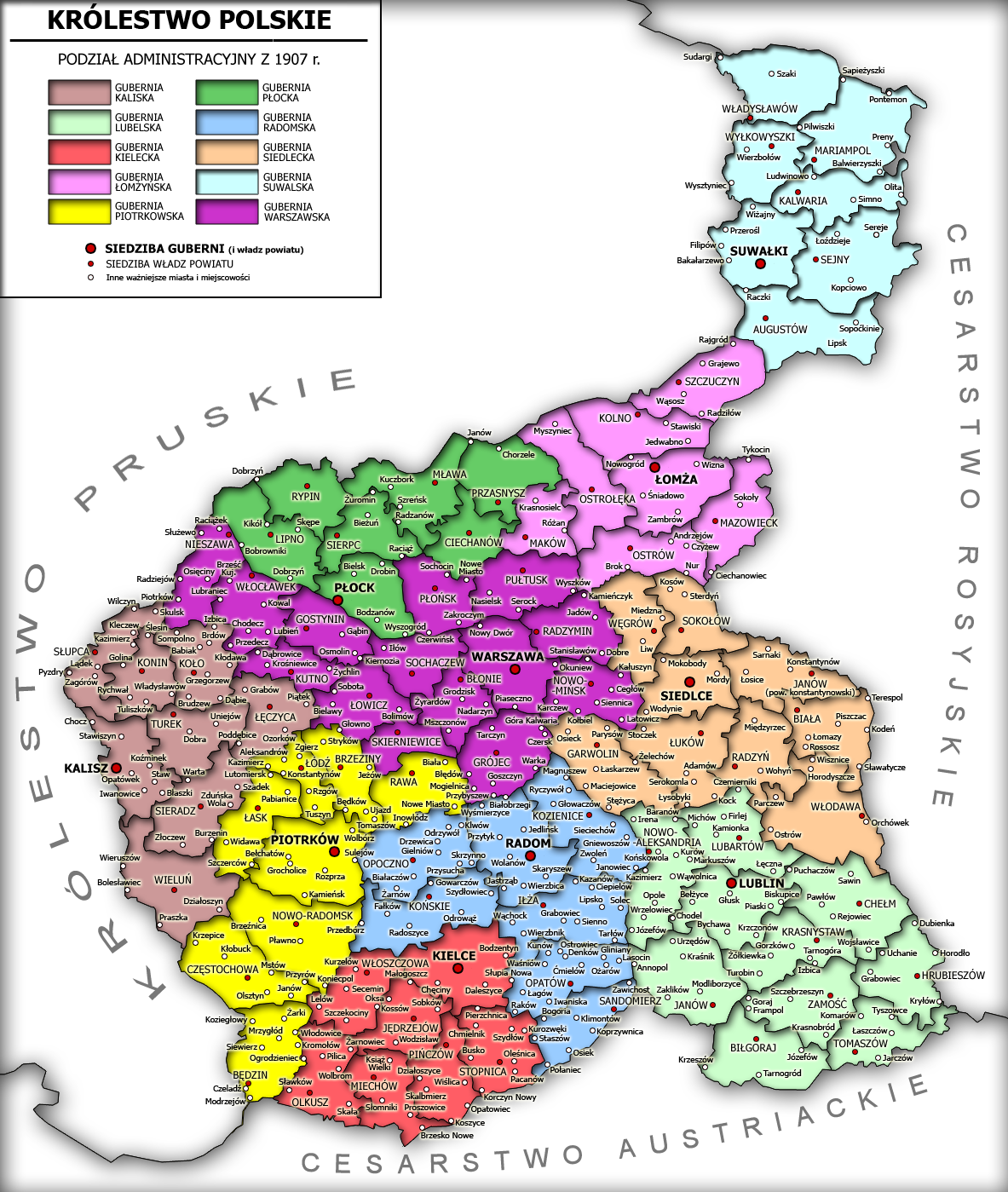
Administrative division of Congress Poland, 1907

Polish voivodeships, 1922–1939.

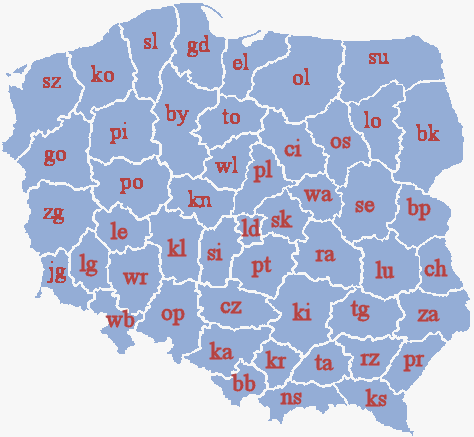
Polish voivodeships, 1975–1998

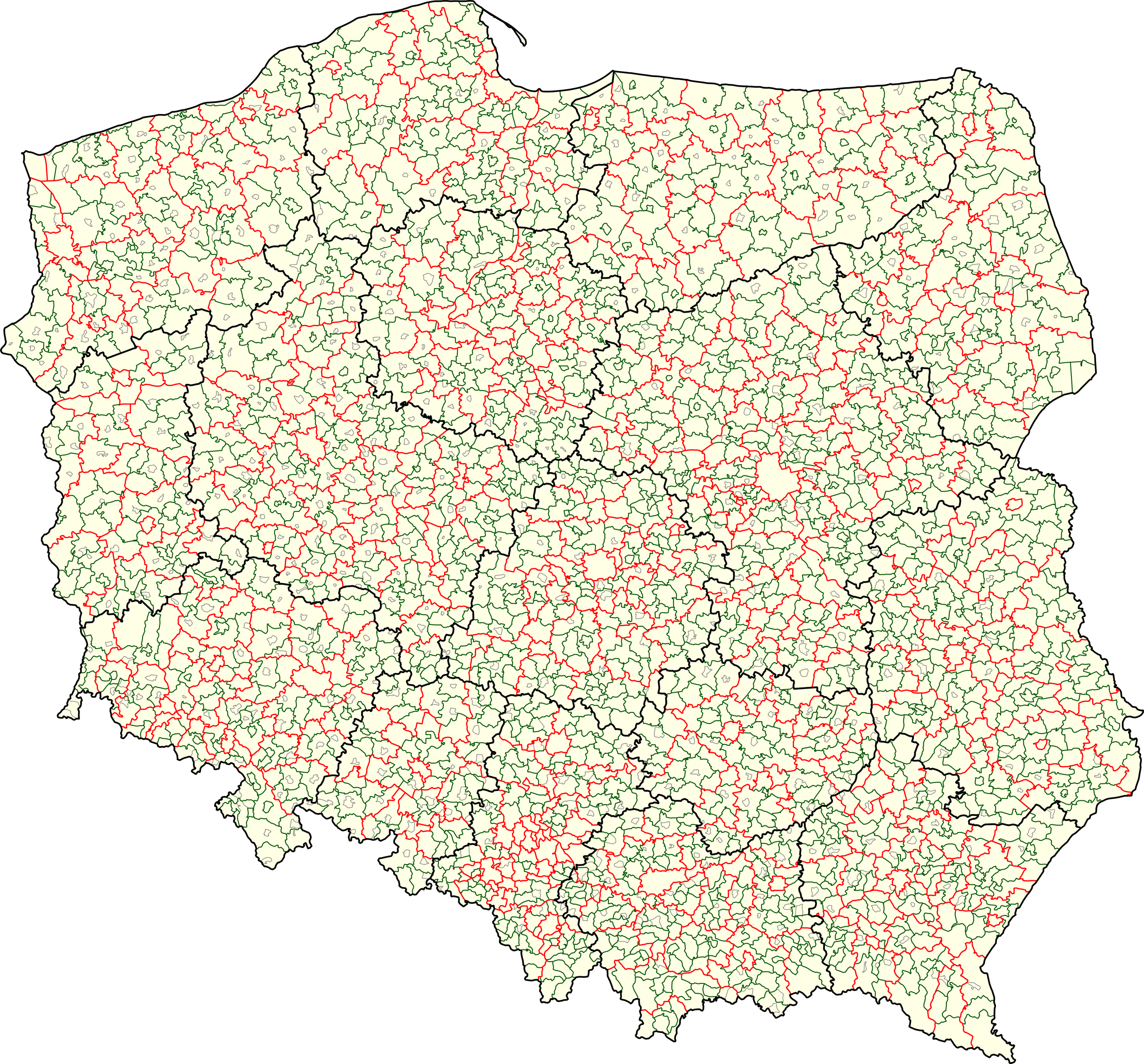
Map of Poland Division into voivodeships, powiats and gminas (2013)

== See also ==
- Administrative division of the Roman Catholic Church in Poland
- Electoral districts of Poland
- Military districts of Poland
- Territorial evolution of Poland
- NUTS of Poland

Cultural and economic:

- Poland A and B
