= Duchy of Sandomierz =

Polish fiefdom of 1138 to 1320

Duchy of Sandomierz Księstwo sandomierskie (Polish) Ducatus Sandomirensis (Latin)
- 1138–1320
- Coat of arms

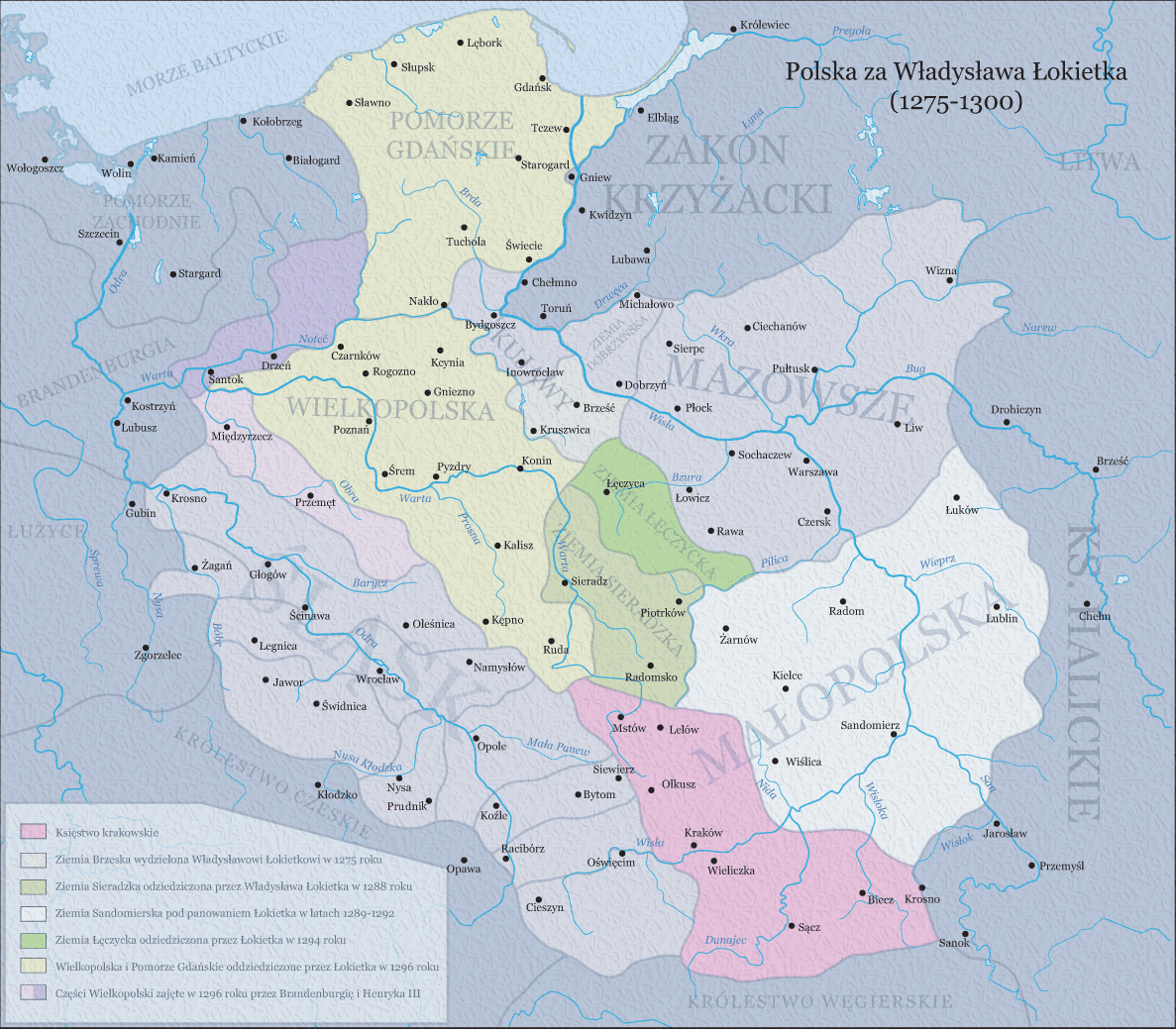
- Kingdom of Poland between 1304 and 1333, including Duchy of Sandomierz.
- Status: Provincial duchy of Poland
- Capital: Sandomierz
- Official languages: Polish, Latin
- Religion: Roman Catholic
- Government: District principality
- Duke
  - 1138–1146 (first, regency): Władysław II the Exile
  - 1146–1166 (first proper): Henry of Sandomierz
  - 1304–1320 (last): Władysław I Łokietek
- Historical era: High Middle Ages
  - Testament of Bolesław III Wrymouth: 1138
  - Wiślica split off: 1166
  - Wiślica reintegrated: 1173
  - Wiślica split off: 1230
  - Wiślica reintegrated: c. 1234
  - Incorporation into Kingdom of Poland: 1320
Preceded by	Succeeded by
Kingdom of Poland	Kingdom of Poland
- Today part of: Poland

The Duchy of Sandomierz (Note: Polish: Księstwo sandomierskie; Latin: Ducatus Sandomirensis) was a district principality and a fiefdom of the Kingdom of Poland. It was formed in 1138 from the territories of the Kingdom of Poland, following its fragmentation, that was started by the testament of Bolesław III Wrymouth. The Duchy existed until 1320 when it was incorporated into the Kingdom of Poland. Its capital was the city of Sandomierz. The territory was centred around Sandomierz Land in the southeastern corner of Poland, between the rivers of Pilica, Vistula, San, and Dunajec.

== History ==
The period of fragmentation of Poland began in 1138, after the Testament of Bolesław III Krzywousty. According to the testament, Duke Henry of Sandomierz was granted the Land of Sandomierz. Since the duke was too young, the newly created province was temporarily ruled by High Duke Władysław II the Exile. In 1146, after another conflict with the junior dukes, Wladyslaw II was forced to flee abroad, and the Duchy of Sandomierz was transferred to Henry.

Henry died in 1166, killed by the Old Prussians. Since he was childless and had no wife, part of his province, with Wislica, was inherited by his youngest brother, Casimir II the Just, while Sandomierz was seized by Bolesław IV the Curly. The province remained divided until 1173, when Casimir II the Just reunited it. Casimir II died in 1194, and the Duchy of Sandomierz was inherited by Leszek I the White, and his younger brother, Konrad I of Masovia. In c. 1200 the brothers divided their properties, with Konrad receiving Mazovia and Kujawy, while Leszek remained in Sandomierz. In 1205, the two brothers united their forces, defeating Roman the Great in the Battle of Zawichost.

In the 13th century, the Duchy of Sandomierz was several times raided by the Mongol hordes (see, e.g., Sack of Sandomierz (1241) and Sack of Sandomierz (1260)). In the late 1280s, Duke Władysław I the Elbow-high took control over Sandomierz, but in 1292, he was forced by Wenceslaus II of Bohemia to abandon the province. In 1304, Lokietek returned, capturing Wislica, and after the death of Wenceslaus (1305), he seized the whole province. During the reign of Lokietek, the Duchy of Sandomierz was turned into Sandomierz Voivodeship.

The Duchy of Sandomierz had twelve castellanies, located in the following towns: Łuków, Lublin, Sieciechów, Radom, Skrzynno, Żarnów, Małogoszcz, Czchów, Wislica, Połaniec, Zawichost and Sandomierz.

== The Dukes of Sandomierz ==
- Henry of Sandomierz (1146-1166)
- Bolesław IV the Curly (1166-1173)
- Casimir II the Just (1173-1194)
- Leszek the White (1194-1227)
- Konrad I of Masovia (1194-1200)
- (as regent) Helen of Znojmo (1194-1200)
- Bolesław V the Chaste (1227-1279)
- Bolesław I of Masovia (1229-1232)
- Leszek II the Black (1279-1288)
- Bolesław II of Masovia (1288-1289)
- Konrad II of Masovia (1289)
- Władysław I the Elbow-high (1289-1292)
- Wenceslaus II of Bohemia (1292-1304)
- Władysław I the Elbow-high (1304-1333)
