= Anastasia Evangelistary =

- National Library of Poland
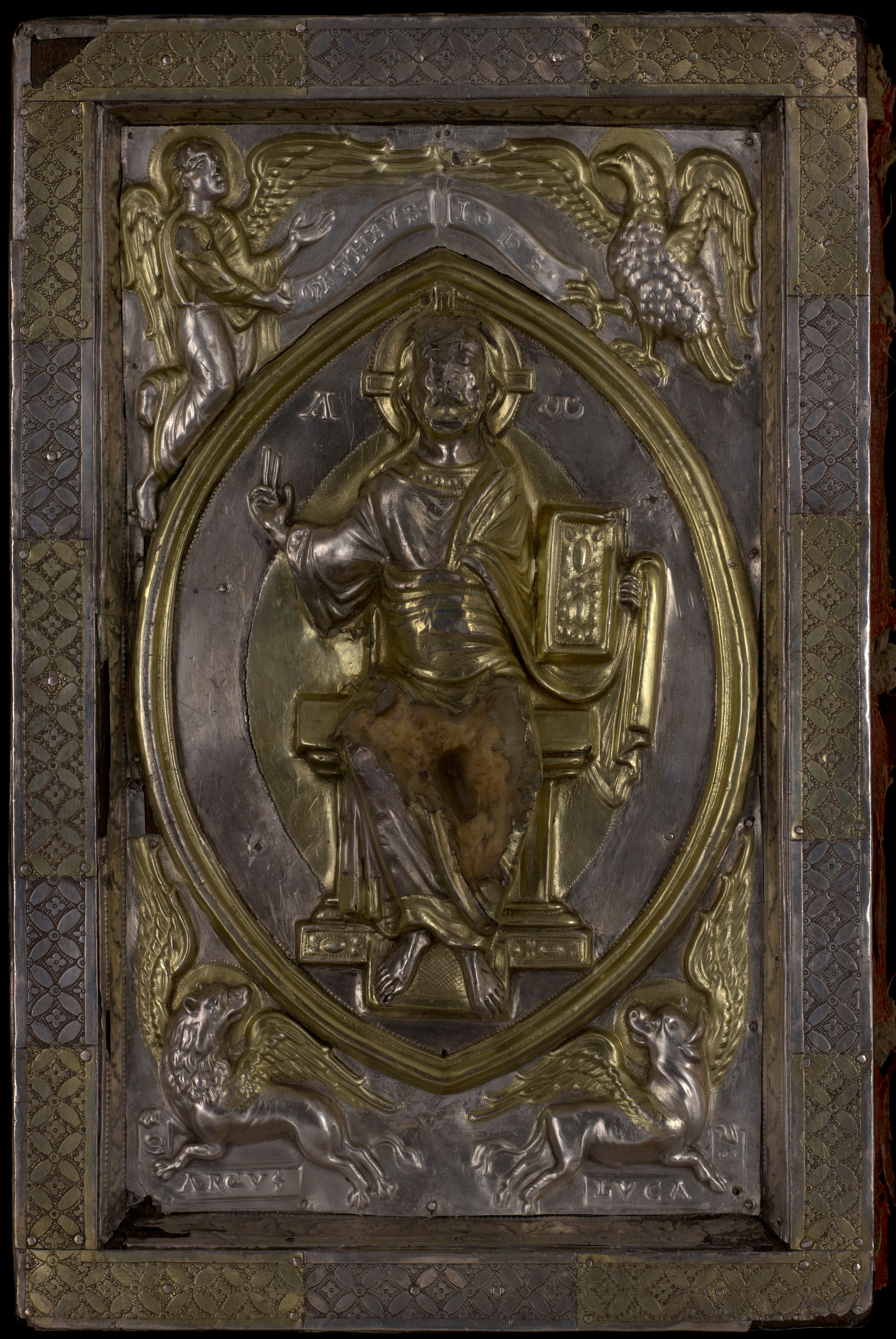
- Type: codex, evangelistary
- Date: 12th century
- Language(s): Latin
- Size: 33.5x20 cm, 66 lvs
- Accession: Rps 3307 II

Anastasia Evangelistary (Polish: Ewangeliarz Anastazji) is an evangelistary from 12th century (probably from around 1160).

The origins of the manuscript are connected with Viacheslava of Novgorod (wife of prince Bolesław IV the Curly), which used in Poland name Anastasia. It is not known where the manuscript was written. The manuscript belonged to the monastery of the Canons Regular in Czerwińsk. After the dissolution of the order in 1819 the manuscript was offered to the Warsaw Society of the Friends of Science. After the November Uprising of 1830–1831, the codex was carried away to St. Petersburg. The manuscript returned do Poland after the Treaty of Riga 1921 and was transferred to the National Library of Poland. In 1939, it was evacuated to Canada, from where it returned in 1959.

This parchment manuscript still has its original, richly decorated binding made of oak covered with silver. The front cover, which is incomplete, originally depicted a crucified Jesus and his mother Mary, St John and a figure indicated as “Anastasia”. The figure of Christ on the cross was torn off by the Swedes during the Swedish Invasion of Poland in 17th century. On the back cover is a representation of Maiestas Domini: Christ, sitting on a mensa-shaped throne, administers a blessing with his right hand and holds a closed book in his left hand.

From May 2024, the manuscript is presented at a permanent exhibition in the Palace of the Commonwealth.

== Bibliography ==
- Makowski, Tomasz; Sapała, Patryk, eds. (2024). The Palace of the Commonwealth. Three times opened. Treasures from the National Library of Poland at the Palace of the Commonwealth. Warsaw: National Library of Poland.
- Tchórzewska-Kabata, Halina; Dąbrowski, Maciej, eds. (2003). More precious than gold. Treasures of the Polish National Library (electronic version) (PDF). Translated by Dorosz, Janina. Warsaw: National Library of Poland. ISBN 83-7009-402-3.
