= Viacheslava of Novgorod =

High Duchess consort of Poland
- Tenure: 1146–1162?
- Born: c. 1125
- Died: 15 March by 1162?
- Spouse: Bolesław IV the Curly
- Issue: Bolesław a daughter, Princess of Shumsk and Dorohychyn; Leszek, Duke of Masovia
- House: Monomakhovichi
- Father: Vsevolod of Pskov
- Mother: daughter of Svyatoslav Davidovich

Viacheslava of Novgorod (Russian: Вячеслава новгородская, Polish: Wierzchosława Nowogrodzka; c. 1125 – 15 March by 1162?), was a Kievan Rus' princess member of the Monomakhovichi and by marriage Duchess of Masovia and Kuyavia and High Duchess of Poland since 1146.

She was the daughter of St. Vsevolod, Prince of Novgorod and Pskov by his wife, a daughter of Svyatoslav Davidovich, Prince of Chernigov.

== Life ==
Nothing is known about Viacheslava's first years; she was one of three children and their only daughter. She had two brothers, Ivan and Vladimir (who was confused in several sources as husband of Princess Richeza of Poland). Both died unmarried and apparently childless.

Around 1137 she was married to Bolesław, son of the Polish Duke Bolesław III Wrymouth. The wedding was probably orchestrated by Bolesław's mother Salomea of Berg, who wanted to secure a Russian alliance against her stepson, the later Władysław II the Exile. On 11 February 1138 Prince Vsevolod died and on 28 October of that year Duke Bolesław III also died, leaving in his will his domains divided between his sons. Prince Bolesław received the Masovian state as Bolesław IV, Duke of Masovia and Kuyavia, and Viacheslava became in the Duchess consort.

In 1141 Viacheslava accompanied her husband at the meeting of Łęczyca, convened at the initiative of her mother-in-law Dowager Duchess Salomea. In 1146 Viacheslava became in the new High Duchess of Poland when her husband expelled his older half-brother Władysław II and became in the ruler of Kraków and High Duke of Poland.

Viacheslava probably died during the 1160s, because by 31 December 1167 High Duke Bolesław IV named his second wife Maria. She probably was buried beside her husband in the Płock Cathedral.

=== Duchess Anastasia's Gospel Book ===
After Viacheslava's death, her husband gave to the cisternian monastery a Gospel Book bound in silver in her memory, called Duchess Anastasia's Gospel Book. Anastasia was probably the Latin or Greek equivalent of her name, according to her chronicler Jan Długosz. Also, he named Viacheslava Princess of Halicz and placed her death in 1158 during childbirth. The wedding date of 1151 given by the chronicler is incorrect. The Gospel Book was probably made around 1160.

== Issue ==
According to almost all the known sources, Viacheslava gave birth to her first child around 1156, after almost twenty years of marriage. This child, a son, was named Bolesław after his father and grandfather. Before 1160, she bore a second child, a daughter, later wife (1178) of Vasilko Iaropolkovich, Prince of Shumsk and later of Dorohychyn.

Earlier literature stated that Bolesław IV's second son Leszek was born from his second marriage with Maria; however, after the discovery of coins upon which Leszek called himself son of Anastasia, this theory proved to be inaccurate.

Prince Bolesław died in 1172 aged sixteen, and reportedly his father was devastated by his early death. One year later (1173), High Duke Bolesław IV died, leaving his Masovian-Kujavian principality to his second and only surviving son Leszek, at the age of eleven or less. As overlord and holder of Kraków and Gniezno, he however was succeeded by his next brother Mieszko III the Old, Duke of Greater Poland.

== Bibliography ==
- Oswald Balzer, Genealogia Piastów, vol. II, Kraków 2005.
- Marcin Spórna and Piotr Wierzbicki, Słownik władców Polski i pretendentów do tronu polskiego, Kraków 2003.
- Temat: Polska, Skarby kultury, Katowice 2004.

Viacheslava of Novgorod Monomakhovichi Born: ca. 1125 Died: 15 March by 1162?
Royal titles
Preceded by Agnes of Babenberg	High Duchess consort of Poland; 1146–1162?	Succeeded by Maria
