= Maria (wife of Bolesław IV the Curly) =

High Duchess of Poland

Maria (c. 1140 – after 1173) was by marriage High Duchess of Poland.

By the majority of historians and web sources, her parentage is unknown; however, others authors believed that she was a daughter of Rostislav I Mstislavich, Grand Prince of Kiev.

== Life ==
It is unknown when exactly the marriage between High Duke Bolesław IV of Poland and Maria took place. The death of Bolesław IV's first wife, Princess Viacheslava of Novgorod took place around the 1160s, and it is assumed that Bolesław IV took his second wife soon after, between 1160–1165.

Nothing is known about Maria's life. She is only named in a charter dated 31 December 1167, under which the chapter of Kraków was granted two villages.

Earlier literature assumed that she was the mother of Leszek; however, after the discovery of coins upon which Leszek called himself son of Anastasia (the Latin or Greek equivalent of High Duchess Viacheslava), this theory proved to be inaccurate.

There is no known date of death or burial place for Maria. Some sources assumed that she survived her husband (who died in 1173) and probably was buried in the Płock Cathedral.

Maria (wife of Bolesław IV the Curly) House of Rurik? Born: ca. 1140 Died: after 1173
Royal titles
Preceded by Viacheslava of Novgorod	High Duchess consort of Poland; 1162?–1173	Succeeded by Eudoxia of Kiev
