= Seniorate Province =

1138–1227 district principality in Duchy of Poland

Seniorate Province Dzielnica senioralna (Polish)
- 1138–1227
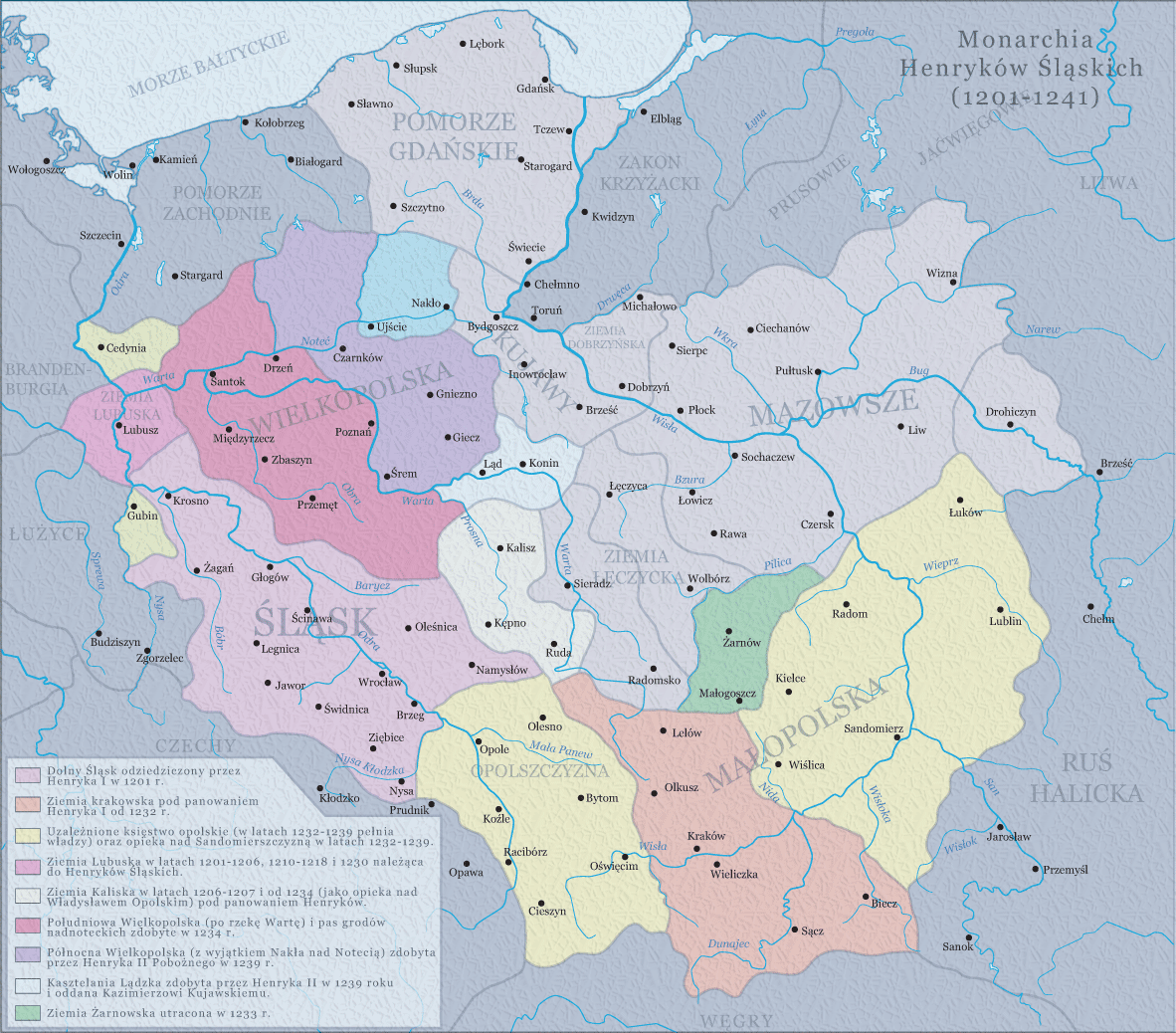
- Map of the division of Poland between 1201 and 1241, including the Seniorate Province.
- Status: Fiefdom within the Duchy of Poland
- Capital: Kraków
- Official languages: Polish, Latin
- Religion: Roman Catholic
- Government: District principality
- High Duke
  - 1138–1146 (first): Władysław II the Exile
  - 1225–1227 (last): Leszek the White
- Historical era: High Middle Ages
  - Establishment: 1138
  - Senior Władysław II exiled: 1146
  - Abolishment of the High Duke title: 1227
Preceded by	Succeeded by
Duchy of Poland	Duchy of Kraków

Seniorate Province, also known as the Senioral Province, (Note: Polish: Dzielnica senioralna) was a district principality in the Duchy of Poland that was formed in 1138, following the fragmentation of the state. Its ruler held the title of the High Duke, ruling all duchies within Poland. In 1227, following the abolition of the High Duke title, the province was transformed into the Duchy of Kraków.

== Senioral principle ==
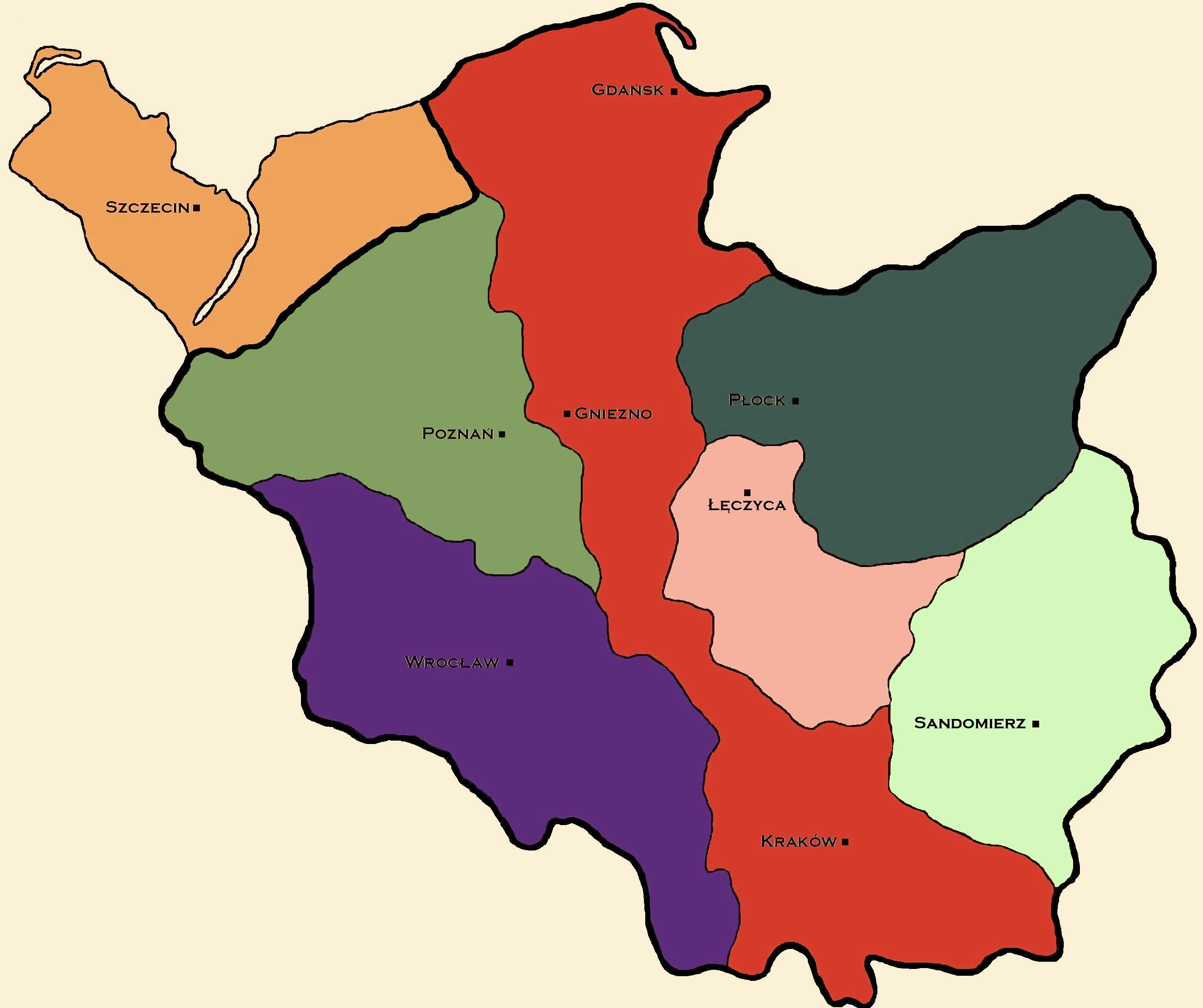
Fragmentation of Poland in 1138: The Seniorate Province, composed of Eastern Greater Poland, Lesser Poland, Western Kuyavia, Wieluń Land under Władysław II Silesian Province of Władysław II Masovian Province of Bolesław IV composed of Masovia and Eastern Kuyavia Greater Poland Province of Mieszko III composed of Western Great Poland Sandomierz Province of Henryk, split off from the Seniorate Province Łęczyca Province (Łęczyca Land and Sieradz Land) under Salomea of Berg Pomerania, originally part of the Seniorate province, split off as a vassal province under the Sobiesławice family

The senioral principle established in the testament stated that at all times the eldest member of the dynasty was to have supreme power over the rest (Dux, the Dukes) and was also to control an indivisible "Seniorate Province". In 1138 Bolesław's III eldest son Władysław II, took up the rule over a vast strip of land running north–south down the middle of Poland, composed of:

- Lesser Poland, except for the eastern Duchy of Sandomierz allocated to Bolesław's III minor son Henry;
- eastern parts of Greater Poland around Gniezno, the Polish ecclesiastical center, and Kalisz;
- western Kuyavia;
- the lands of Łęczyca, held by Bolesław's III widow Salomea of Berg for life.

The High Duke resided at Kraków, Poland's capital since 1038. The Senior's prerogatives also included control over the Duchy of Silesia and his Pomerelian vassals at Gdańsk in eastern Pomerania. The Senior was tasked with defense of borders, the right to have troops in provinces of other Dukes, carrying out the foreign policy, supervision over the clergy (including the right to nominate bishops and archbishops), and minting the currency.

The High duke generally had his own principality (province, dukedom), which he had inherited within his own branch of the Piast dynasty, and left to his personal heirs within his own branch, whereas Kraków followed the seniorate (fell to the oldest of them). Kraków was a substantial addition to the resources of the incumbent, whoever it was, and was intended to put him higher in might than his vassal dukes.

However, the seniorate soon collapsed, with the first Senior - Władysław II the Exile - failing his bid to take over other provinces and in 1146 was expelled by his younger half-brothers, an incident which led to long-time Polish particularism.

== History ==
The duchy neighboured originally each of the four partition duchies of Masovia at Płock, Sandomierz, Silesia at Wrocław and Greater Poland at Poznań. Even after many of those were further partitioned, it bordered on several principalities, and was at least close to all.

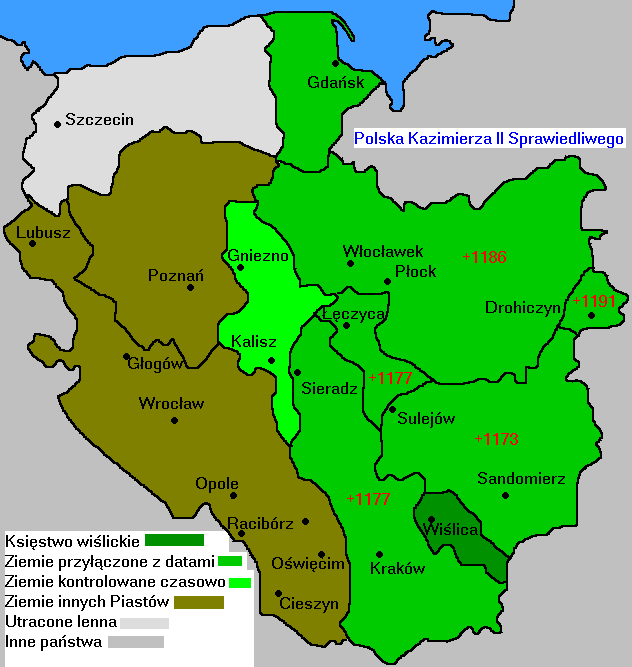
Polish duchies under Casimir II the Just (1163-1194)

Upon the exile of High Duke Władysław II the rule was assumed by Władysław's II eldest brother Bolesław IV the Curly, Duke of Masovia, who died without issue in 1173. He was followed in the Seniorate by the second eldest Mieszko III the Old, while Masovia and the Kuyavian lands passed to Bolesław's IV minor son Leszek.

The senioral principle finally turned out to be a failure as Mieszko's III rule at Kraków was not only challenged by the sons of expelled Władysław II, but also by the youngest son Casimir II the Just, who had not received any share by his late father's testament. Though upon the death of Bolesław IV the Curly he had received the Duchy of Sandomierz, in 1177 he took the occasion of an uprising by Lesser Polish nobles (magnates) and assumed the rule as High Duke from his elder brother Mieszko III. A long-term struggle between the brothers followed, whereby Mieszko III was able to incorporate the northwestern lands of Gniezno and Kalisz into his Duchy of Greater Poland.

The Seniorate remained contested after Kraków was inherited by Casimir's II son Leszek I the White in 1194, still by his uncle Mieszko III (d. 1202), then by his younger brother Konrad of Masovia, by his cousin, Mieszko's III son Władysław III Spindleshanks and also by the second son of Władysław II the Exile, Duke Mieszko IV Tanglefoot of Upper Silesia. In the long-term struggle Leszek I was killed in 1227 and the Pomerelian lands got lost, when Duke Swietopelk II of Gdańsk declared himself independent.

== List of Rulers ==
- Władysław II the Exile (1138–1146)
- Bolesław IV the Curly (1146–1173)
- Mieszko III the Old (1173–1177)
- Casimir II the Just (1191–1194)
- Leszek the White (1194–1198)
- Mieszko III the Old (1198–1199)
- Leszek the White (1199)
- Mieszko III the Old (1199–1202)
- Władysław III Spindleshanks (1202–1206/1210)
- Leszek the White (1206/1210–1210)
- Mieszko IV Tanglefoot (1210–1211)
- Leszek the White (1211–1225)
- Henry the Bearded (1225)
- Leszek the White (1225–1227)

== Bibliography ==
- Genealogia Piastów by 0. Balzer. Kraków. 1895.
- Dzieje Polski piastowskiej (VIII w.-1370) by J. Wyrozumski. Kraków. "Fogra". 1999. ISBN 83-85719-38-5, OCLC 749221743.
