= Leszek, Duke of Masovia =

Leszek
- Coat-of-arms of Piast of Poland

Duke of Masovia
- Reign: 1173-1186
- Predecessor: Bolesław IV the Curly
- Successor: Casimir II the Just
- Born: ca. 1162
- Died: 1186
- Burial: Płock
- House: Piast
- Father: Bolesław IV the Curly
- Mother: Wierzchosława
- Religion: Christian (Roman Catholic)

Leszek of Masovia (Polish: Leszek, also Lestek; b. ca. 1162 - d. 1186) was a Polish prince from the Piast dynasty, the Duke of Masovia from 1173 until his death. He was the only son of Bolesław IV the Curly, Duke of Masovia and High Prince of Poland, to survive his father. After his father's death he inherited Masovia. At the beginning, Leszek ruled under the guardianship of his uncle Casimir II the Just. He was a man of poor health. For a short time he supported his other uncle, Mieszko III the Old, but later decided to reconcile with Casimir II, who after Leszek's death inherited his duchy.

== Early life ==
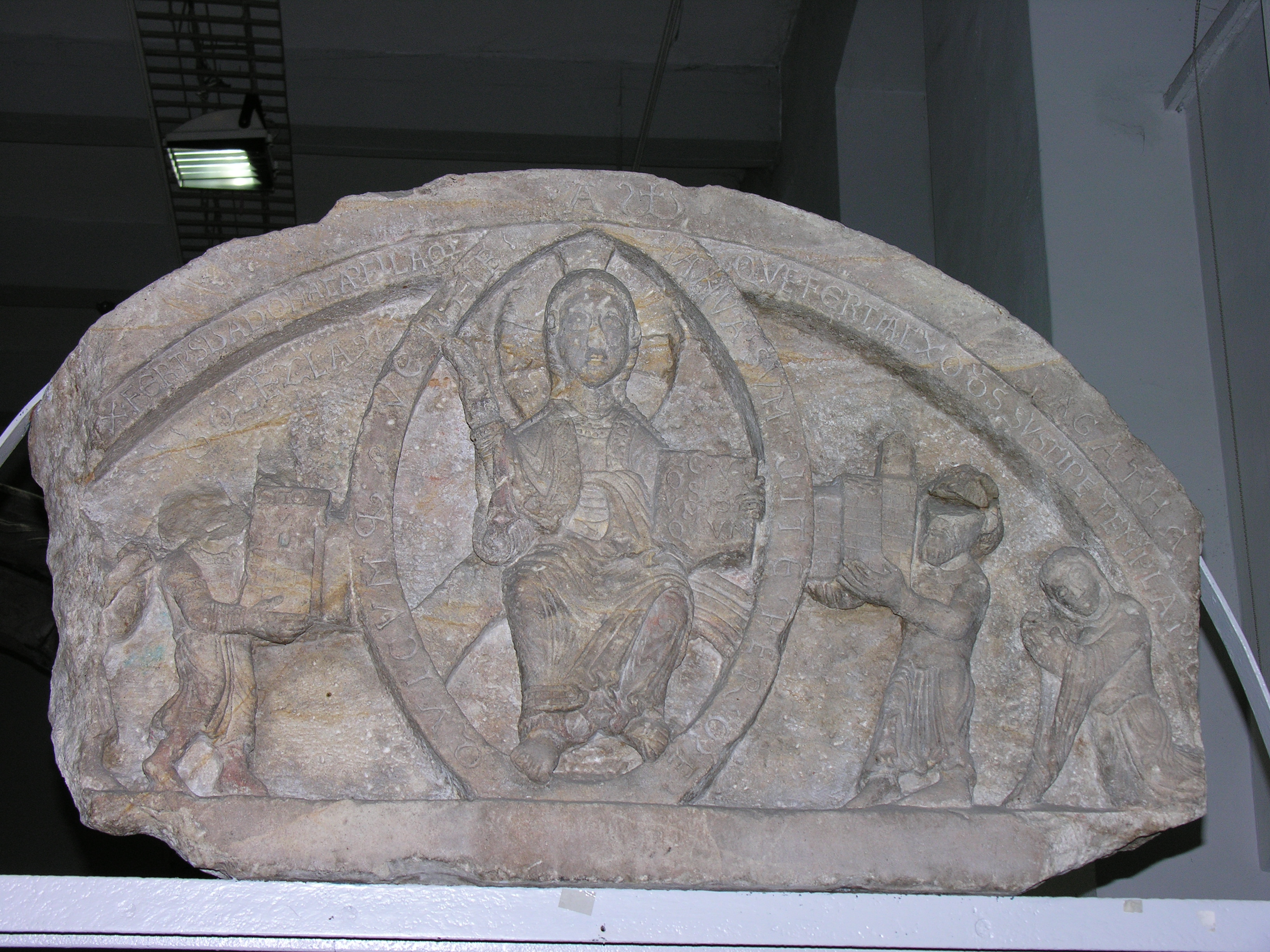
Tympanon of Ołbin.

Older Polish historians, like Oswald Balzer, named him Leszko, which is now considered as incorrect. The correct form is ending with "ek". In a document written in Latin, Leszek was mentioned as Lizstek (1177). Most Polish historians use the version "Leszek", but some modern Polish historians started to use the version Lestek. Historian Józef Mitkowski stated that Leszek was named thanks to the courtly tradition preserved by Gallus Anonymus in his Cronicae Polonorum, but as pointed out by historian and genealogist Kazimierz Jasiński, he could be named after the eldest full-brother of his father, who died in his youth before 1131.

In the past historians were unsure which wife of Bolesław IV the Curly was the mother of Leszek: the first, Wierzchosława, daughter of St. Vsevolod, Prince of Novgorod and Pskov, or the second, Maria. According to chronicler Jan Długosz, Leszek was the son of Anastazja, a princess of Halych and the first wife of Bolesław IV. Oswald Balzer found this information to be incorrect, as the first wife of Bolesław IV was named Wierzchosława and she was not from Halych.

According to the historian Miron Korduba, Leszek was the son of Maria. Józef Mitkowski and Kazimierz Jasiński supposed that he was the son of the first wife of Bolesław IV rather than the second. However, after the discovery of coins on which Leszek noted his parents as BOL (Bolesław IV the Curly) and ANA (Anastazja), it became clear that he was the son of his father's first marriage, as Wierzchosława is mentioned in some sources as Anastazja.

The date of Leszek's birth is unknown. According to Jan Długosz, writing in the 15th century, he was born in 1158. Historian Oswald Balzer stated that Leszek was born between 1160 and 1165. He based his argument on a document from 26 April 1177, in which Leszek was mentioned as taking the last place among Polish princes, after Mieszko "junior" (Misico iunior dux). Balzer considered that this meant that Leszek was younger than Mieszko, who according to Balzer was Mieszko III the Old's son Mieszko the Younger, who was born after 1159. Balzer also thought that Leszek had to be at least 12 years old in order to be considered an official witness . This date proposed by Balzer had thus been accepted in historiography. However, his argument was refuted as the Mieszko "junior" mentioned in said document was shown instead to be Mieszko IV Tanglefoot (born before 1147), and also that a prince could be mentioned in document as a witness even when he was less than 12 years old.

Based on the tympanum from Ołbin made in 1172, historian Kazimierz Jasiński supposed that at that time Leszek was around 10 years old, and therefore he would have been born around 1162. These idea is accepted by some historians. Borys Paszkiewicz considered that the year of birth given by Długosz (1158) could be right.

== Duke of Masovia and Kuyavia ==
The death of his older brother Bolesław in 1172 left Leszek as the only heir of his father. High Duke Bolesław IV, reportedly devastated by his first-born son's death, died one year later (5 January 1173). He left Masovia (and Kuyavia, which was in the 12th century a part of Masovia) to Leszek, at the age of eleven or less. The overlordship of Poland, which included the control over Kraków and Gniezno, was taken by the eldest surviving brother of Bolesław IV, Mieszko III the Old.

According to his father's will, Leszek began his rule under the guardianship of his youngest uncle, Casimir II the Just. When in 1177 Casimir II became prince of Kraków, he nominated the magnate Żyron as a guard for Leszek, who suffered from extremely poor health.

According to the 18th-century Russian historian Vasily Tatishchev, based on older historiography, Leszek fought against Prince Volodar of Minsk, who in 1180 captured Brest, which belonged to his brother-in-law, Vasilko Iaropolkovich. After a long and exhausting war, Brest was ultimately not recovered, and Vasilko gave all the rights over this land to Leszek. This account is now considered as unreliable, however.

At some time before 1186 Leszek unexpectedly changed his dynastic politics. Under the influence of his entourage and Żyron, he decided to support his uncle Mieszko III the Old. He declared Mieszko III his guardian and made a testament in which declared his cousin Mieszko the Younger, son of Mieszko III, his heir. Shortly afterwards Mieszko the Younger started acting as if he was already the ruler of Masovia and Kuyavia, and so Leszek apologized to Casimir II and changed his testament to make Casimir II his heir.

On 20 January 1185 Leszek made a big donation to the bishopric of Włocławek, including among others Słońsk and village Kowale.

== Death and legacy ==
Leszek died in 1186. The day of his death is unknown. The Duke Leszek whose death is mentioned in the necrology of the abbey of St. Vincent in Wrocław on 21 November is, according to historians, Senior Duke Leszek the White, who was killed on 24 November 1227.

There is no information about a wife or children of Leszek of Masovia. Information provided by Kadłubek supported the theory that he died unmarried and childless According to Vasily Tatishchev, 18th-century Russian historian, citing an unknown Polotsk's Latopis, Vasilko Yaropolkovich, Prince of Drohiczyn, was married to daughter of Leszek, duke of Masovia. Older historiography considered this information as reliable, correcting early a crucial fact, namely that Vasilko married a sister, not the daughter, of Leszek. Currently information from Tatishchev about Vasilko Yaropolkovich is considered unreliable. These were not based on lost sources but were likely results of Tatsihchev's fabrications.

According to chronicler Jan Długosz, Leszek was buried in the Płock Cathedral. Długosz could have obtained this information from some lost source, but he could also know this from an autopsy, or it could just be his own supposition. However, this information is considered as likely by modern historiography.

Under his last will, his heir was Casimir II the Just. Some Polish historians (first Henryk Rutkowski) considered that after Leszek's death, Mieszko III the Old took control over the western part of Kuyavia. However, there is no direct evidence in primary sources about that fact.

== Footnotes ==
Leszek, Duke of Masovia Piast Dynasty Born: ca. 1162 Died: 1186
Preceded by Bolesław IV the Curly	Duke of Masovia; 1173–1186	Succeeded by Kazimierz II the Just
