= Józef Mitkowski =

Polish historian and professor

Józef Mitkowski (1911–1980) was a Polish historian. In 1969 he gained the title of professor.

Mitkowski collaborated with the Western Institute.

== Publications ==
- Pomorze Zachodnie w stosunku do Polski, Poznań: Wydawnictwo Instytutu Zachodniego 1946.
- Początki klasztoru cystersów w Sulejowie: studia nad dokumentami, fundacją i rozwojem uposażenia do końca XIII w., Poznań: nakł. Poznańskiego Towarzystwa Przyjaciół Nauk 1949.
- Śląsk w okresie formowania i utrwalania się państwa polskiego : do roku 1138, Opole: Instytut Śląski 1966.
- Kancelaria Kazimierza Konradowica, księcia kujawsko-łęczyckiego 1233-1267, Kraków: Zakład Narodowy im. Ossolińskich. Wydawnictwo PAN 1968.
- Bolesław Krzywousty, Warszawa: Wydawnictwa Szkolne i Pedagogiczne 1981.
