= Military districts of Poland =

Military districts of Poland were created in the aftermath of World War I, at a time when Poland regained its independence.

Initially, right after the First World War, Polish Land Forces had five military districts. (1918–1921):

- Kraków Military District (Krakowski Okręg Wojskowy), HQ in Kraków
- Łódź Military District (Łódzki Okręg Wojskowy), HQ in Łódź
- Lublin Military District (Lubelski Okręg Wojskowy), HQ in Lublin.
- Poznań Military District (Poznański Okręg Wojskowy), HQ in Poznań
- Warsaw Military District (Warszawski Okręg Wojskowy), HQ in Warsaw.

In 1921, due to reorganization, the military districts were replaced with Dowództwo Okręgu Korpusu (DOK – Corps District Command). In the Second Polish Republic there were ten DOK's:

- I – Warsaw
- II – Lublin
- III – Grodno
- IV – Łódź
- V – Kraków
- VI – Lwów
- VII – Poznań
- VIII – Toruń
- IX – Brześć nad Bugiem
- X – Przemyśl

Each DOK consisted of four large units (three infantry divisions and one cavalry brigade).

For district arrangements after World War II see Polish Land Forces. The Kraków Military District disbanded in 1953.

From 1999 Poland has been divided into two military districts, the Pomeranian Military District and the Silesian Military District, both were disbanded by the end of 2011.
