= Henry of Sandomierz =

- Duke of Sandomierz
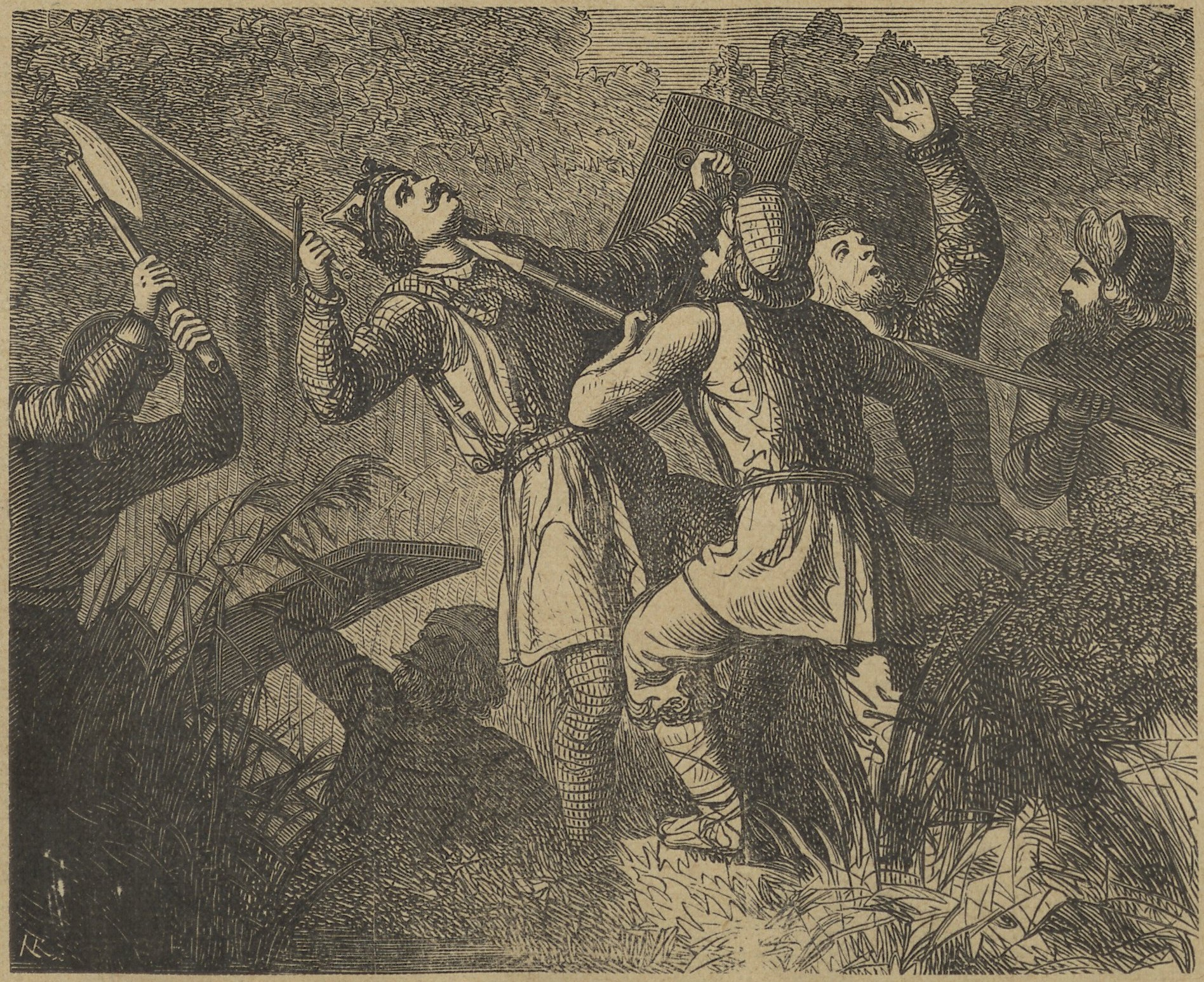
- Death of Henry of Sandomierz (19th century Polish illustration)
- Born: 1131
- Died: 18 October 1166 (aged 35)
- Noble family: Piast dynasty
- Father: Boleslaus III Wrymouth
- Mother: Salomea of Berg

Henry of Sandomierz (Polish: Henryk) (1131 – 18 October 1166) was the duke of Sandomierz from 1138 until his death. He took part in the Second Crusade. Upon his return from the Holy Land, Henry organized a battle against the Prussians and died in battle.

== Rulership ==
He was the fifth but third surviving son of Boleslaus III of Poland by his second wife Salomea, daughter of Henry, Count of Berg, from whom he received his name. According to his father's will, Henry inherited the Duchy of Sandomierz. Boleslaus also appointed Henry's half-brother Władysław II the Exile as regent for Henry, as Henry was only 7 years old when his father died.

As ruler of Sandomierz, Henry appears only on the occasion of the Act of Foundation of a Church in his land. His ducal title was rarely mentioned by the chronicles, who called him a son of Boleslaus III Wrymouth or brother of Boleslaus IV the Curly. He was the "King of the Poles" mentioned by the Greek chronicler John Kinnamos. Henry was the commander of the Polish contingent in the Second Crusade in 1147. This incursion in the Crusades was short because in 1149, together with his older brother Boleslaus IV, he took part in a military expedition in Kiev to support the Grand Prince Iziaslav II.

== Crusades ==
The first and maybe the most famous of all Sandomierz's dukes, Henry certainly ventured to the Holy Land in 1153–1154 (a number of Polish annals reported it under the year 1154 as did Jan Długosz in his Annals) and took part in the Second Crusade under the command of King Baldwin III of Jerusalem. Henry's close affiliation with crusading resulted in the establishment of a commandery of the Hospitallers (between 1154 and 1166) in Zagość.

After returning to Poland with an air of holiness, Henry, together with his brothers, organized a battle against the pagan Prussians. The military expedition, under the command of Bolesław IV and Henry, launched in the second half of 1166. According to the chronicles, Henry was killed in battle against the Prussians. The date of his death, 18 October 1166, was known through indirect sources. However, there is a legend, where Henry apparently was killed in the current Wąbrzeźno County, probably in the vicinity of Nielub or Orłowo, close to the Wieczno Lake.

== Succession ==
Henry never married and hence left no legitimate offspring. In his will, he left his duchy to his posthumous brother, Casimir II the Just, who, until that time, had remained without lands. These last wills were done only partially. The destiny of the Duchy of Sandomierz could be shown in a document dated 31 December 1167:

In the year 1166, in Poland, during the reign of Princes Boleslaus, Mieszko and Casimir, their fourth brother, Prince Henry, died without offspring. His district has been divided into three parts; the seat of his sovereignty, Sandomierz, was granted to Boleslaus, the older brother. The same day and year, Mateusz, Bishop of Kraków, also died.

The other two parts were taken by the other surviving brothers: Wiślica was given to Kazimierz II, and the rest to Mieszko III the Old. His remains were probably buried in a crypt of a church in Wiślica, where his grave is marked by an ornamental tombstone donated by his younger brother Kazimierz II. Only in 1173, after the death of Bolesław, Kazimierz finally could take the title of Duke of Sandomierz.

== Bibliography ==
- Balzer, O. Genealogia Piastów, Kraków, 1895.
- Gładysz, M. Zapomniani krzyżowcy, Warszawa, 2006.
- Guttner, D. "Henryk of Sandomierz." [in:] The Crusades: An Encyclopedia, Santa Barbara, 2006.
- Jasiński, K. Rodowód pierwszych Piastów, Warszawa, 1992.
- Mitkowski, J. "Henryk książę sandomierski." [in:] Polski Słownik Biograficzny, vol. 9, Wrocław, 1960–1961.
- D. von Güttner-Sporzyński, Poland, Holy War, and the Piast Monarchy, 1100–1230, Brepols, Turnhout, 2014.

Henry of Sandomierz Piast Dynasty Born: ca. 1131 Died: 18 October 1166
New title	Duke of Sandomierz; 1138 – 1166	Succeeded by Bolesław IV the Curly
