= Bolesław IV the Curly =

Duke of Masovia from 1138 to 1173 and High Duke of Poland from 1146 to 1173

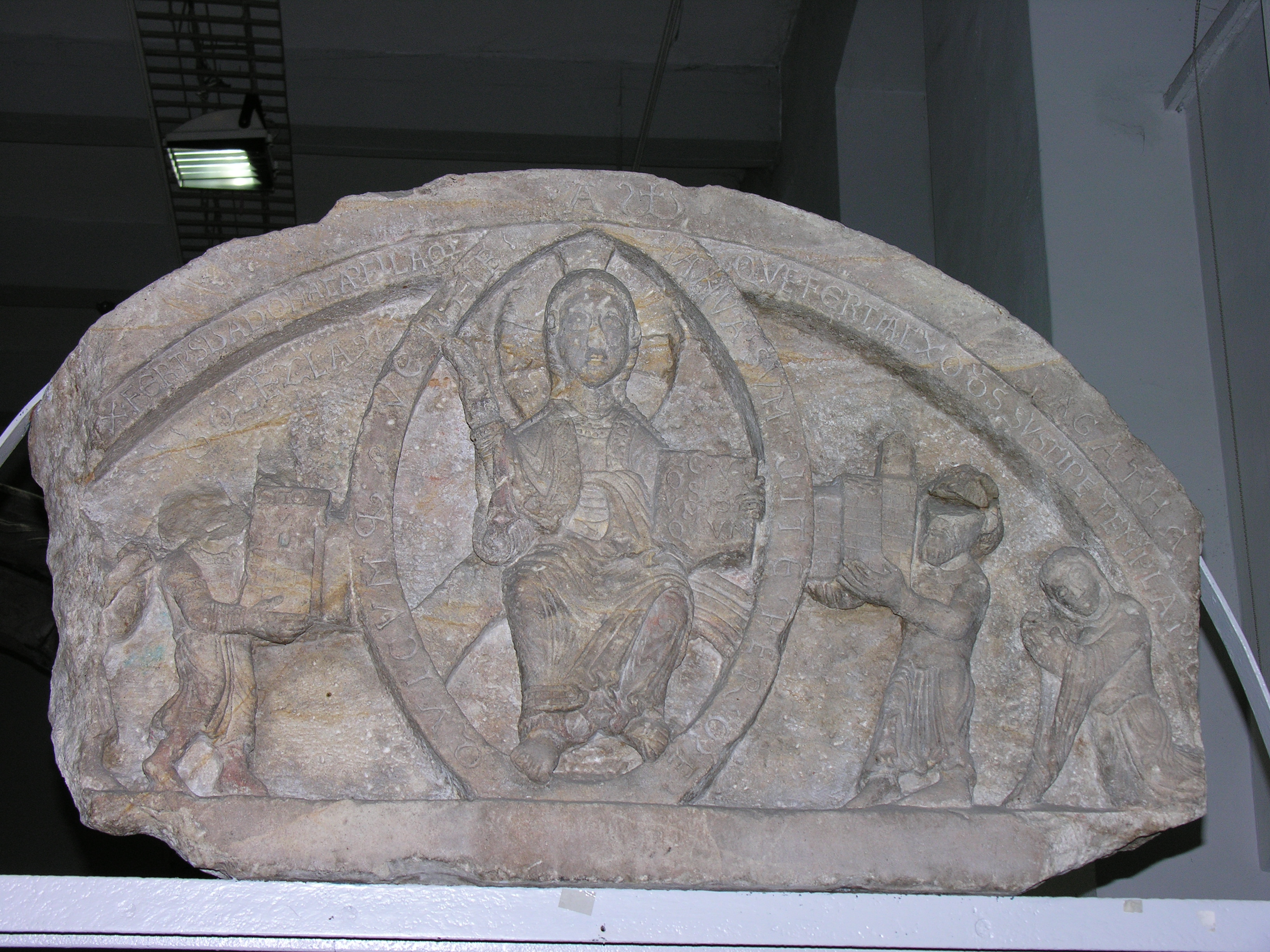
- Effigy of Bolesław IV the Curly (left) on a Romanesque tympanum from Ołbin

High Duke of Poland
- Reign: 1146 – 1173
- Predecessor: Władysław II the Exile
- Successor: Mieszko III the Old
- Born: c. 1122
- Died: 5 January 1173 (aged 51)
- Spouses: Viacheslava of Novgorod; Maria
- Issue: Leszek, Duke of Masovia
- House: Piast dynasty
- Father: Bolesław III Wrymouth
- Mother: Salomea of Berg

Bolesław IV the Curly (Polish: Bolesław IV Kędzierzawy; c. 1122 – 5 January 1173), a member of the Piast dynasty, was Duke of Masovia from 1138 and High Duke of Poland from 1146 until his death in 1173.

== Early life ==
Bolesław was the third son of Duke Bolesław III Wrymouth of Poland by his second wife Salomea of Berg. The death of his older brothers, Leszek and Casimir, before 1131 and in October 1131, respectively, left him as the eldest son of their parents. Bolesław was 13 years old at the time of his father's death (1138) and of the legal age to take on the government of the lands he inherited according to testament of Bolesław III Wrymouth, his father's testament, the newly created Duchy of Masovia (composed of Masovia and eastern Kuyavia).

In the first years of his government, young Bolesław remained under the strong influence of his mother and Voivode Wszebor, who feared the ambition of his elder half-brother, High Duke Władysław II. Władysław II tried to restore the unity of the country and deposed the junior dukes.

== Fraternal struggle ==
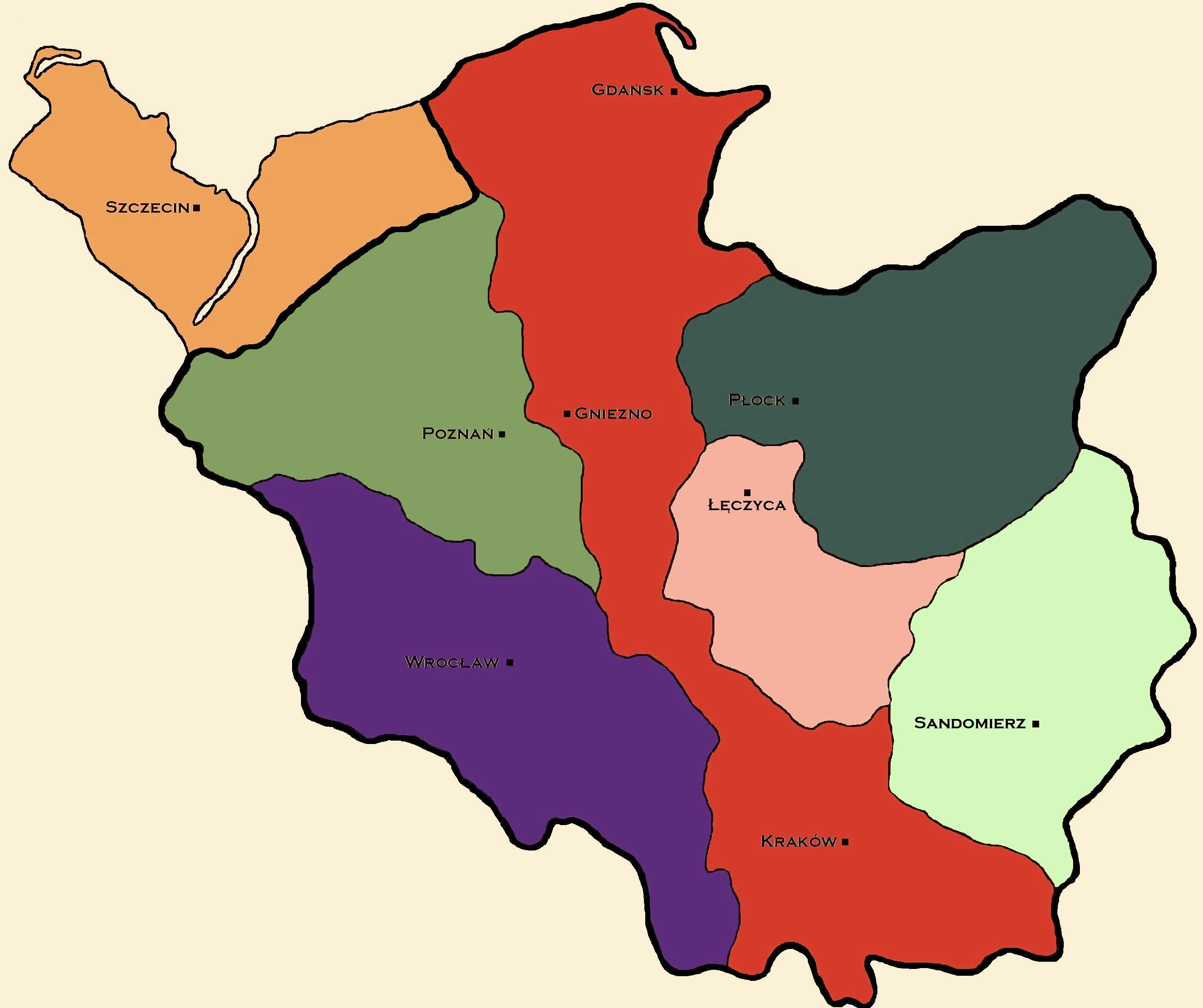
Poland's division into autonomous duchies following the death of Bolesław III the Wrymouth. Bolesław's Masovian province, with seat in Płock, is shown in dark green.

Trouble began openly in 1141, when Dowager Duchess Salomea — without the consent of High Duke Władysław II — organised a meeting with her sons at her residence in Łęczyca. Here was decided the betrothal of her youngest daughter, Agnes, to Mstislav II of Kiev, in order to gain allies in a possible conflict. She also set up the division of the Łęczyca lands, her dower, between her sons upon her death. The junior dukes in this first struggle were definitely defeated, because Grand Prince Vsevolod II of Kiev decided to make an alliance with Władysław II, reinforced by the marriage of Vsevolod's daughter Zvenislava with the high duke's eldest son, Bolesław the Tall. An additional humiliation for Bolesław IV and his brothers was that they were sent by the high duke on an expedition to the Kievan Rus' as ambassadors during 1142–1143.

The "peace" lasted only two years until 1144 when, after Salomea's death and according to Bolesław III's Testament, the Łęczyca province reverted to the Seniorate Province of High Duke Władysław II. The idea to reserve the lands for his younger brothers Henry and Casimir II was not popular with Wladyslaw, who thought that the land was only temporarily separated from his Dzielnica senioralna and now in its entirety should be returned. The outbreak of civil war was therefore only a matter of time.

The war erupted with full force in 1145, and it seemed that the junior dukes were defeated and the high duke finally achieved the unification of the country. At first, the combined forces of Bolesław IV and his brothers prevented the disaster and demanded a hasty reorganisation of the forces of Władysław at the Battle on the Pilicą River. The major significance of this battle was to the former voivode Wszebor, whose military experience far exceeded the ability of Władysław's commanders. Soon, however, the situation was totally reversed as a result of the Kievan troops who entered in the country as Władysław's allies. Bolesław then had to agree to step down and renounce any pretension over the lands belonging to his mother.

The concessions of the junior dukes ultimately didn't resolve the problem. Moreover, Władysław's confidence in his forces had him embark on a final solution, the removal of his half-brothers from their lands. Suddenly, the junior dukes could rely on the support of the high duke's all-powerful voivode Piotr Włostowic, for whom Władysław's plans were too radical and threatened to weaken his position. While Władysław opted for a quick response against him (the voivode was blinded and muted), forcing Włostowic to go to Kiev, the high duke's final decision on his confrontation with the voivode considerably weakened his position. What's more, Włostowic convinced the Kievans to break his alliance with Władysław.

== Expulsion of Władysław II ==
At the beginning of 1146, the rebellions against Władysław's government rose mighty, sparked by the fate of Piotr Włostowic. Nevertheless, the final victory of Władysław seemed likely, especially after the conquest of Masovia (forcing Bolesław to escape) and the siege of Poznań in Greater Poland in the spring of 1146. However, thanks to the rebellion in Władysław's own lands and the excommunication imposed on him by the Archbishop of Gniezno, the high duke suffered an unexpected defeat. Władysław and his family had to flee across the border with the Holy Roman Empire, at first to Bohemia and later to Germany, accommodated by King Conrad III.

The junior dukes reassigned the Polish provinces between them. The Duchy of Silesia and the Seniorate Province at Kraków were taken by Bolesław, who also received the title of high duke; the western Duchy of Greater Poland was retained by his brother Mieszko III, and Henry finally received his long-promised land of Sandomierz. Casimir II, the youngest brother, again remained without lands.

== Interventions ==
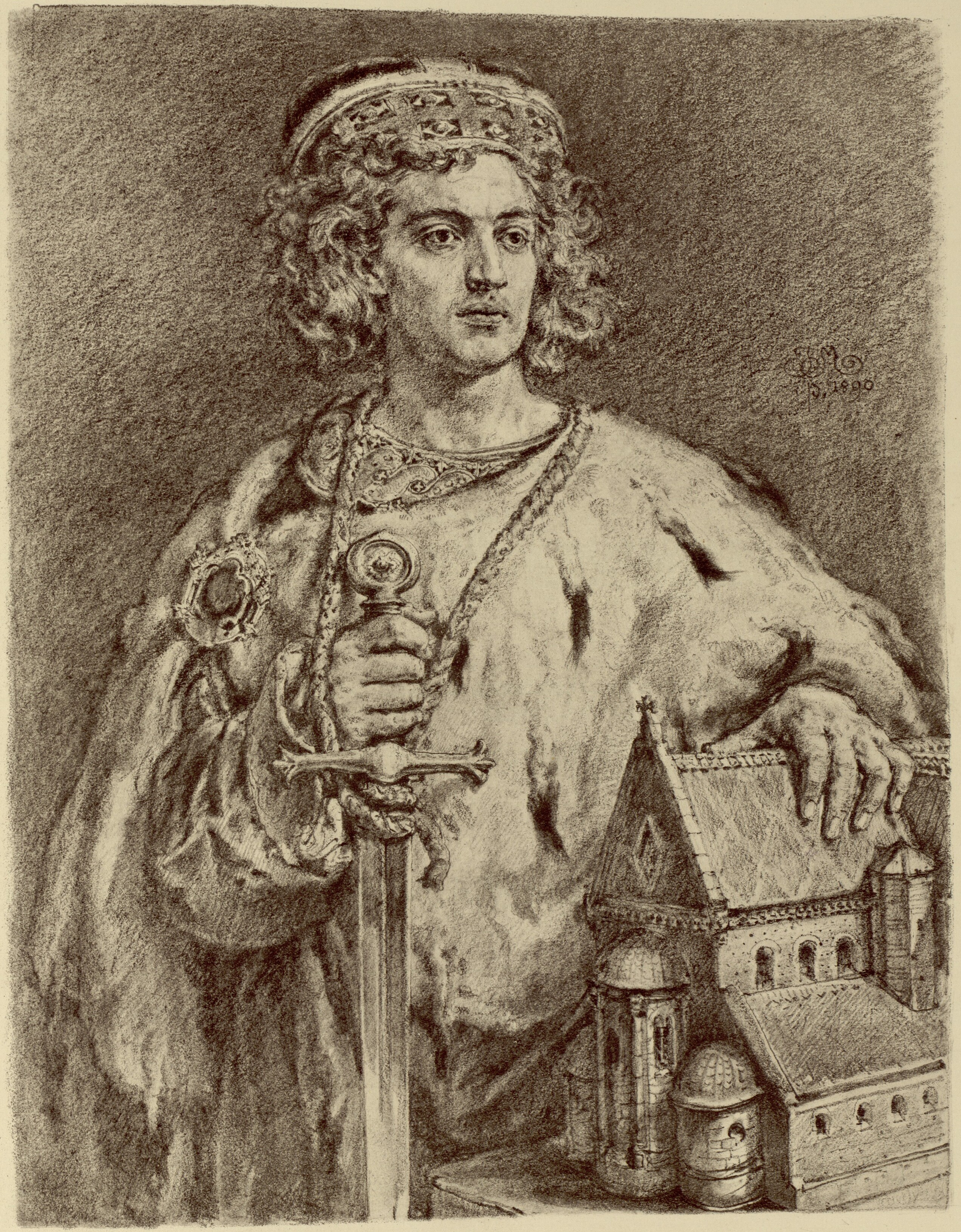
Imaginary 19th century depiction of Bolesław IV, by Jan Matejko. During his life, Bolesław sponsored convents, monasteries and monks, especially the Benedictines.

Thanks to the intrigues of his wife, Agnes of Babenberg, a half-sister of King Conrad III, Władysław II succeeded in convincing his brother-in-law to make a military expedition to Poland. The hastily organised expedition, however, clashed with the reluctance of the former subjects of the deposed high duke, and was finally defeated already on the Polish border near the Oder river in August 1146.

In subsequent years, Bolesław IV, along with his younger brothers, sought to maintain good relations with the royal House of Hohenstaufen, Władysław's allies. To this end, in 1148 the junior dukes organized a meeting in Kruszwica, to which they invited the warlike Margrave Albert the Bear of the German Northern March (the later Margraviate of Brandenburg), who had reached the Polish border in the course of the Wendish Crusade. There, Bolesław arranged the marriage of his sister Judith with the margrave's son Otto. Boleslaw and Mieszko also militarily supported the Germans in the fight against the reluctant West Slavic Lutici tribes, considerably contributing to the stability of German domination over the middle Spree region. The second important ally of the Piast prince was the Wettin margrave Konrad of Meissen.

Initially, Bolesław also had a difficult relationship with another opposing force policy like the Hohenstaufens: the Roman Curia under the Pope Eugene III. At first, in 1147, the Papal legate Humbold recognised Bolesław as the new high duke and overlord of Poland. However, one year later, and again instigated by the intrigues of Władysław's wife Agnes, the newly appointed Papal legate Guy arrived in the country in connection with the refusal to restore the former high duke, and declared the ban over Poland. The penalty, thanks to the cohesive support of the Polish church hierarchy by the junior dukes, was virtually without repercussions.

Things worsened for Bolesław in 1157, when King Conrad's nephew Frederick Barbarossa, crowned emperor by Pope Adrian IV in 1155, decided to make a new expedition to Poland, thanks to the ongoing pressures by his aunt Agnes, Władysław's wife. This time, the campaign was well organised, and the Emperor was well determined to force Bolesław IV to accept his own conditions. It's unknown why Bolesław opted for a highly security tactics of war, not defending the swampy areas in front of the middle Oder river, which was for centuries the natural defense of Poland, nor the strongholds of Głogów and Bytom in Silesia. The Imperial army quickly advanced and soon laid siege to Poznan.

Given the difficult situation, Bolesław was forced to accept the humiliating negotiations and, in a shameful ceremony on 30 August 1157, was declared a vassal of the Empire at his camp in Krzyszkowo. Bolesław was on his knees and begged for forgiveness from the Emperor, in return for which he kindly received from Barbarossa the further control over the Polish lands; also, he had to pay an enormous tribute to the Emperor. For unknown reasons, however, despite Barbarossa's victory, Władysław II, to his great disappointment was not restored to the Polish throne. Bolesław formally swore loyalty to the Emperor on Christmas Day in Magdeburg, and gave his younger brother, Casimir II, as a hostage. Two years later, Władysław died in exile, having never returned to his country again.

Not before 1163, the sons of the late Władysław, Bolesław I the Tall and Mieszko IV Tanglefoot, backed by the Emperor, insisting on the agreement made with Bolesław IV, were restored in their Silesia heritage; but this return didn't affect the power of Bolesław as a high duke. Thanks to its German affinities, the senior branch of the Silesian Piasts at least managed to retain its Silesian lands (Wrocław, Legnica, Głogów, Opole and Racibórz) without problems.

== Crusade against the Prussians ==
Following the defeat by the German forces, Bolesław initiated a bold plan for the conquest of the pagan Prussians, settling beyond the northeastern Polish border along the Baltic coast. This concept of an early Prussian Crusade was conceived in view of the repeated seizures by more and more Baltic tribes in the several districts of Bolesław's Masovian province. The high duke proclaimed a crusade against the pagans and pressured the collaboration of both the pope and the Emperor. The initial campaigns were successful; however, efforts and attempts to conquer these provinces were finally defeated in 1166. Furthermore, during one of the battles, the younger brother of the high duke, Henry of Sandomierz, was killed.

== Rebellion of Casimir the Just ==
After Henry's death, against the dispositions of Bolesław III's Testament, the high duke incorporated Sandomierz into the Seniorate Province. This caused the anger and frustration of his youngest brother, Casimir II the Just, who was the next in line to inherit the lands and was the only of Bolesław III's sons still without any land.

Casimir was supported in his rebellion by his elder brother Duke Mieszko III the Old of Greater Poland, the magnate Jaksa of Miechów and Sviatoslav, son of Voivode Piotr Włostowic, as well as the Archbishops of Gniezno and Kraków; also, almost all Lesser Polish nobility was on his side. In February 1168, the rebels gathered in Jędrzejów, and there they proclaimed Mieszko III as the new high duke and Casimir was formally invested with Sandomierz. But in the end, Bolesław maintained his rule by largely accepting the demands of the rebels; he divided late Henry's duchy into three parts: the lands of Wiślica were granted to Casimir, Bolesław himself obtained Sandomierz proper and the rest passed to Mieszko III.

After the disaster of the Prussian Crusade, the Silesian dukes Bolesław I the Tall and Mieszko IV Tanglefoot attempted to dethrone the high duke and to recover the Seniorate Province and thereby the Polish overlordship. Bolesław's reprisal expedition in the following year ended with a total disaster, so the high duke eventually had to reconcile with his Silesian nephews.

In 1172, Duke Mieszko III rebelled again; this time supporting his grandnephew Jarosław of Opole (the eldest son of Bolesław I the Tall), who, forced to become a priest in his early years, was barred from the Silesian succession. Unsatisfied with this, Jarosław tried to gain power and obtain his own lands. The support of this rebellion was so strong that his father was forced to escape to Erfurt. This originated another expedition in his aid by Emperor Frederick Barbarossa, who again invaded Poland and defeated the rebels. The high duke ordered Mieszko III to Magdeburg, where peace was made with the Empire after the payment of 8,000 pieces of silver and the Silesian duchy was again granted to Bolesław I the Tall at the Emperor's mercy; despite his victory, the high duke finally accepted the autonomy of his Silesian nephews.

Shortly afterwards, another rebellion took place, this time of the Lesser Polish nobles, who were extremely dissatisfied with the harsh and dictatorial high duke's government. The rebels invited Casimir II, then duke of Wiślica, to take the Kraków throne, but Bolesław's resistance against his younger brother was so strong that both parties made concessions, which led finished with any riots until the end of the high duke's reign. Casimir succeeded Bolesław in Sandomierz upon his death in 1173 and became high duke four years later.

== Relations with the Church ==
Bolesław was known for his many gifts and grants to the Church. Particularly enriched thanks to him, among others were: the Church of St. Mary and St. Catherine and of St. Vincent near Wrocław, the Benedictine monastery in Trzemeszno and the Collegiate church in Tum near Łęczyca. Around 1151, he founded the Canonical Regular Kolegiata in Czerwińsk.

== Marriages and issue ==
In 1137, Bolesław married Viacheslava (b. ca. 1125 – d. 15 March ca. 1162?), daughter of Prince Vsevolod Mstislavich of Novgorod and Pskov. They had three children:

1. Bolesław (b. 1156 – d. 1172);
2. A daughter (b. ca. 1160 – d. aft. 1178), married ca. 1172/1173 to Vasilko Iaropolkovich, Prince of Shumsk and Dorohychyn;
3. Leszek (b. ca. 1162 – d. 1186).

After the death of his first wife, Bolesław married Maria (d. aft. 1173), whose origins are disputed. This union was childless.

Bolesław's eldest son died in 1172, aged sixteen and reportedly the high duke was devastated by his death. He was succeeded in the Masovian-Kujavian principality by his second and only surviving son, Leszek, at the age of eleven or less. As overlord and holder of Kraków and Gniezno, he however was succeeded by his next brother Mieszko III the Old.

== See also ==
- History of Poland (966–1385)
- Macław

Bolesław IV the Curly Piast Dynasty Born: ca. 1123 Died: 5 January 1173
| New title | Duke of Masovia and Kuyavia; 1138 – 1173 | Succeeded by Leszek |
| Preceded by Władysław II | Duke of Silesia; 1146 – 1163 | Succeeded by Bolesław I the Tall and Mieszko I Tanglefoot |
| Preceded by Władysław II | High Duke of Poland; 1146 – 1173 | Succeeded by Mieszko III the Old |
| Preceded by Henry | Duke of Sandomierz; 1166 – 1173 | Succeeded by Casimir II the Just |
