= Duchies of Silesia =

Divisions of the region of Silesia

Duchy of Silesia Slezské knížectví (Czech) Księstwo Śląskie (Polish) Herzogtum Schlesien (German) Ślōnske Firsztyntōmy (Silesian)
- 1335–1742
- Flag Coat of arms

- Duchies of Silesia within the Bohemian Crown and the Holy Roman Empire (1618)
- Status: Crown land of the Bohemian Crown
- Capital: Wrocław, Opole
- Common languages: Czech, Polish, German
- Religion: Catholicism; Lutheranism; Hussitism, later Bohemian Reformed (Utraquism, Brethren); Judaism (Jews)
- Demonym: Silesian
- Government: Monarchy
- King
  - 1335–1378: Charles I (first)
  - 1916–1918: Charles III (last)
- History
  - Joined Kingdom of Bohemia: 1335
  - Hungarian rule: 1469–1490
  - Dissolution of the Piast dynasty: 1675
  - Austrian Silesia formed: 1742
Preceded by	Succeeded by
Duchy of Silesia	Austrian Silesia; Province of Silesia
- Today part of: Poland; Czech Republic; Germany

The Duchies of Silesia were the more than twenty divisions of the region of Silesia formed between the 12th and 14th centuries by the breakup of the Duchy of Silesia, then part of the Kingdom of Poland. In 1335, the duchies were ceded to the Kingdom of Bohemia under the Treaty of Trentschin. Thereafter until 1742, Silesia was one of the Bohemian crown lands and lay within the Holy Roman Empire. Most of Silesia was annexed by the King of Prussia under the Treaty of Berlin in 1742. Only the Duchy of Teschen, the Duchy of Troppau and the Duchy of Nysa remained under the control of the Bohemian crown and as such were known as the Duchy of Upper and Lower Silesia until 1918.

== Breakup of Polish Silesia (1138–1335) ==
In the (vain) hope to prevent an inheritance dispute, the Piast prince Bolesław III Wrymouth by his last will and testament had divided Poland into hereditary provinces distributed among his four sons: Masovia, Sandomierz, Greater Poland and Silesia. Beside which, the Seniorate Province (Lesser Poland) with the residence of Kraków was reserved for the eldest, who according to the principle of agnatic seniority was to be High Duke of all Poland. This act inadvertently started the process known as Fragmentation of Poland.

Bolesław's son Władysław II received the Duchy of Silesia and, as the eldest, was also granted the title of a High Duke along with the Seniorate Province. Nevertheless, after he had tried to gain control over all Poland, he was banned and expelled by his younger half-brothers in 1146. Bolesław's second eldest son Bolesław IV the Curly, Duke of Masovia, became Polish High Duke. When, in 1163, Władysław's three sons, backed by Emperor Frederick I Barbarossa returned to Poland, Bolesław IV had to restore their heritage.

After ten years of joint rule, Władysław's sons finally divided Silesia in 1173:

- Bolesław I the Tall, the eldest, received the core territory around the residences of Wrocław, Legnica and Opole. In 1180, he granted the Duchy of Opole to his son Jarosław, who ruled until his death in March 1201. Upon Bolesław's death in December 1201, his lands were inherited by his only remaining son Henry I the Bearded.
- Mieszko I Tanglefoot became Duke of Racibórz and received Bytom and Oświęcim in 1177.
- Konrad Spindleshanks (Konrad Laskonogi), the youngest, in 1177 also claimed his rights and received the Duchy of Głogów from his brother Bolesław, who after Konrad's death about 1180/90 again inherited it.
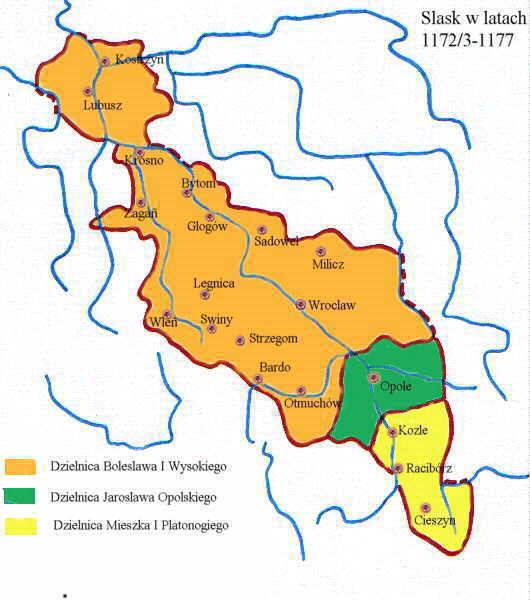
1172/3-1177
Bolesław I
Jarosław
Mieszko I

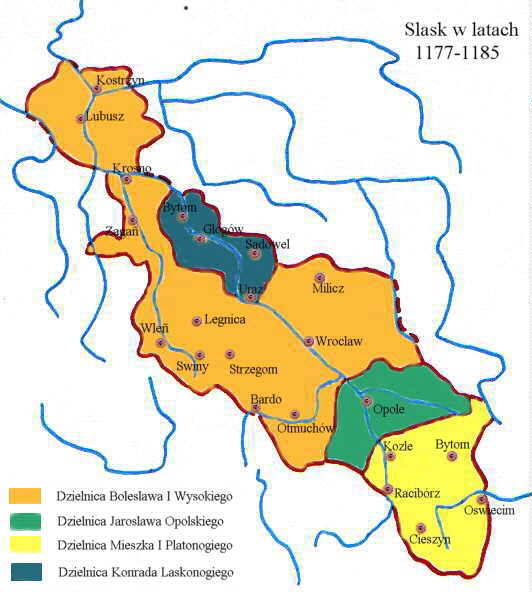
1177-1185
Bolesław I
Jarosław
Mieszko I
Konrad

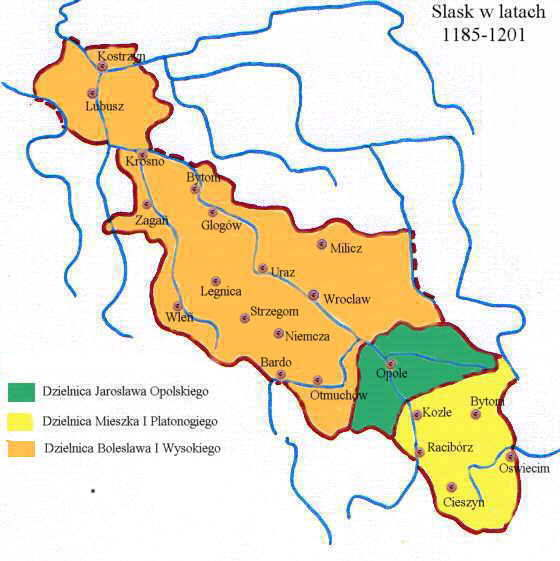
1185-1201
Bolesław I
Jarosław
Mieszko I

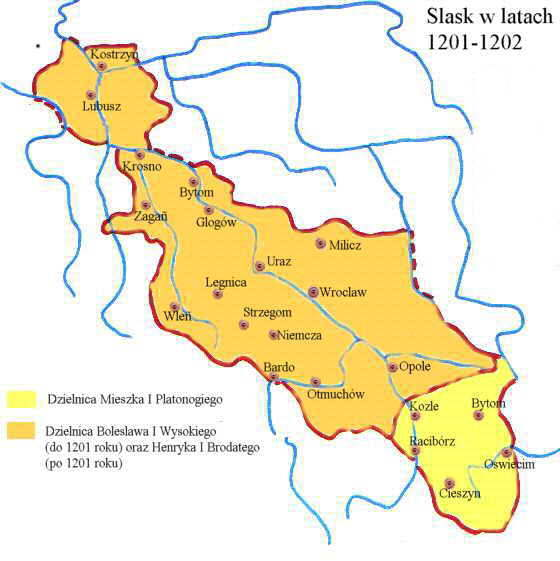
1201-1202
Henry I
Mieszko I

After his brother Bolesław I had died, Mieszko I Tanglefoot also conquered and took the Duchy of Opole from his nephew Henry I the Bearded. He ruled over the Racibórz and Opole duchies, which emerged as Upper Silesia, until his death in 1211. Henry I the Bearded remained sovereign of the Lower Silesian Duchy of Wrocław, he acquired the Greater Polish lands of Kalisz in 1206, which he granted to his Piast cousin Władysław Odonic, as well as Lubusz Land in 1210. High Duke of Poland from 1232, he conquered further Greater Polish territories around Santok in 1234.

Mieszko's heir was Duke Casimir I of Opole, who died in 1230. Thereupon, Henry I managed to reunite whole Silesia under his reign. He was succeeded by his son Henry II the Pious in 1238, while Upper Silesia was inherited by Casimir's son Mieszko II the Fat in 1239. He and his younger brother, Władysław Opolski, had already received Greater Polish Kalisz in 1234.

Henry II was killed at the Battle of Legnica in 1241. His eldest son and heir, Duke Bolesław II the Bald temporarily gave Lubusz Land to his younger brother Mieszko († 1242). He reconciled with his Greater Polish cousin Duke Przemysł I and finally returned Santok in 1247 and remained sole ruler of Lower Silesia until 1248.

Mieszko II the Fat, of Upper Silesia, in 1244, returned Kalisz to Duke Przemysł I of Greater Poland. He died in 1246 and his possessions were inherited by his brother Władysław Opolski.

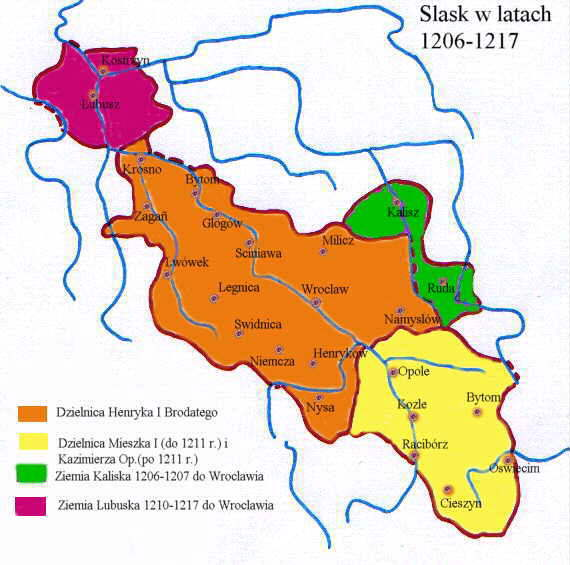
1206-1217
Henry I
Władysław Odonic
Lubusz Land
Mieszko I,
1211: Casimir I

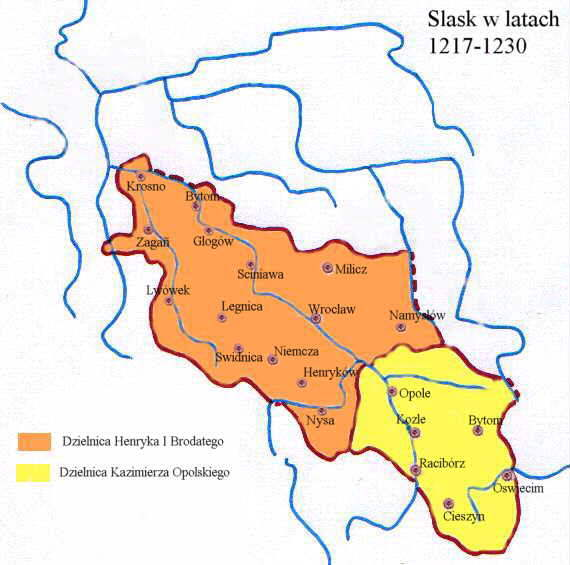
1217-1230
Henry I
Casimir I

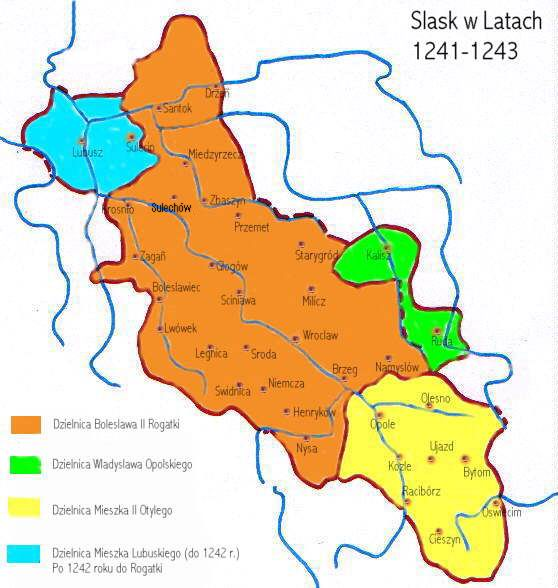
1241-1243
Bolesław II
Mieszko Lubuski
Władysław Opolski
Mieszko II

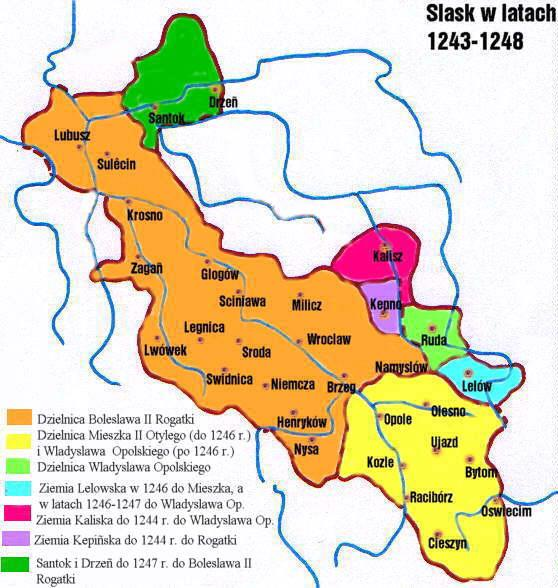
1243-1248
Bolesław II
Władysław Opolski
Mieszko II,
1246: Władysław
Opolski
Santok
Kalisz
Kępno
Lelów

== Duchies of the Bohemian Crown (1335–1918) ==
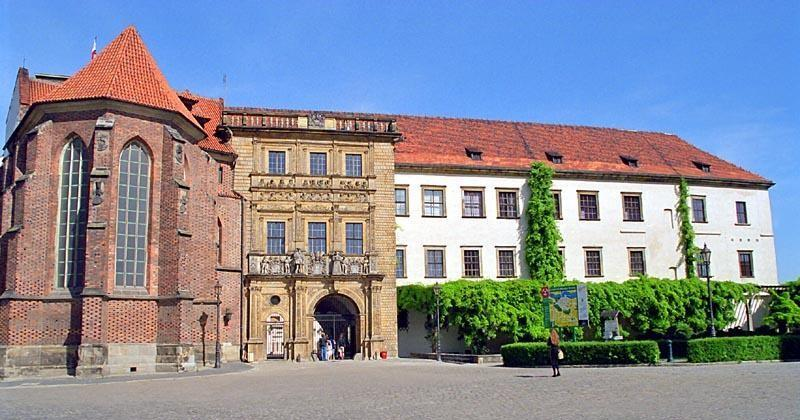
Brzeg Castle, place of death of the last duke of the Piast dynasty in 1675

In 1327, King John I of Bohemia began accepting the fealty of the Silesian dukes as part of his claim on the Polish crown. At the Treaty of Trentschin on 24 August 1335 it was agreed that John would abandon his claim and in return receive the suzerainty of the Silesian duchies and a one-time payment (20,000 threescores of Prague groschen). This was finalized at the Congress of Visegrád in the same year, although some Piast-ruled duchies remained outside of Bohemian suzerainty until 1392.

Under the Bohemian crown, the duchies continued to be ruled by branches of the Piast dynasty known as the Silesian Piasts until their last lineage died out in 1675. When a ducal lineage died out, the duchy passed to the crown and became a state country.

The Bohemian Crown passed to the House of Habsburg in 1526. In 1742, most of Silesia was annexed by Prussia following the First Silesian War. This was confirmed following the Second Silesian War in 1745 and the Third Silesian War in 1763. Following the dissolution of the Holy Roman Empire, Bohemian Silesia remained a part of the Austrian Empire and Austro-Hungarian Empire down to its dissolution in 1918.

== List of Silesian duchies ==
- Duchy of Bernstadt
- Duchy of Bielsko (Bílské knížectví, Księstwo Bielskie, Herzogtum Bielitz)
- Duchy of Brzeg (Knížectví Břeh, Księstwo Brzeskie, Herzogtum Brieg)
- Duchy of Bytom (Knížectví Bytomské, Księstwo Bytomskie, Herzogtum Beuthen)
- Duchy of Cosel (Koźle)
- Duchy of Crossen
- Duchy of Falkenberg
- Duchy of Freudenthal
- Duchy of Freystadt
- Duchy of Gleiwitz
- Duchy of Głogów (Knížectví Hlohovské, Księstwo Głogowskie, Herzogtum Glogau)
- Duchy of Głogówek and Prudnik (Hornohlohovsko-prudnické knížectví, Księstwo głogówiecko-prudnickie, Herzogtum Klein Glogau und Prudnik)
- Duchy of Głubczyce (Knížectví Hlubčice, Księstwo Głubczyckie, Herzogtum Leobschütz)
- Duchy of Haynau
- Duchy of Jawor (Javorské knížectví, Księstwo Jaworskie, Herzogtum Jauer)
- Duchy of Krnov (Krnovské knížectví, Księstwo Karniowskie, Herzogtum Jägerndorf)
- Duchy of Legnica (Lehnické knížectví, Księstwo Legnickie, Herzogtum Liegnitz)
- Duchy of Löwenberg (Lemberské knížectví, Księstwo Lwóweckie, Herzogtum Löwenberg)
- Duchy of Loslau
- Duchy of Lüben
- Duchy of Münsterberg (Minstrberské knížectví, Księstwo Ziębickie, Herzogtum Münsterberg)
- Duchy of Namslau
- Duchy of Nysa (Niské knížectví, Księstwo Nyskie, Herzogtum Neisse)
- Duchy of Oels (Olešnické knížectví, Księstwo Oleśnickie, Herzogtum Oels)
- Duchy of Ohlau
- Duchy of Opole (Opolské knížectví, Księstwo Opolskie, Herzogtum Oppeln)
- Duchy of Opole and Racibórz
- Duchy of Oświęcim (Osvětimské knížectví, Księstwo Oświęcimskie, Herzogtum Auschwitz)
- Duchy of Pless (Pštinské knížectví, Księstwo Pszczyńskie, Herzogtum Pless)
- Duchy of Racibórz (Ratibořské knížectví, Księstwo Raciborskie, Herzogtum Ratibor)
- Duchy of Racibórz and Opava (Ducatus Ratiboria et Oppaviensis)
- Duchy of Racibórz and Krnov (Ducatus Ratiboria et Carnovia)
- Duchy of Rybnik
- Duchy of Siewierz (Seveřské knížectví, Księstwo Siewierskie, Herzogtum Sewerien)
- Duchy of Sprottau
- Duchy of Steinau
- Duchy of Strehlitz
- Duchy of Świdnica (Svídnické knížectví, Księstwo Świdnickie, Herzogtum Schweidnitz)
- Duchy of Teschen (Księstwo Cieszyńskie, Knížectví těšínské, Herzogtum Teschen)
- Duchy of Tost
- Duchy of Troppau (Vévodství opavské, Księstwo Opawskie, Herzogtum Troppau)
- Duchy of Wohlau
- Duchy of Wrocław (Vratislavské knížectví, Księstwo Wrocławskie, Herzogtum Breslau)
- Duchy of Zator (Zatorské knížectví, Księstwo Zatorskie, Herzogtum Zator)
- Duchy of Żagań (Zaháňské knížectví, Księstwo Żagańskie, Herzogtum Sagan)

There were also other little duchies: Buchwald, Coschok, Goldberg, Grottkau, Grünberg, Hirschberg, and Parchwiz.

== Bibliography ==
- Žáček, Rudolf. Dějiny Slezska v datech. Praha: Libri, 2003. ISBN 80-7277-172-8.
