= Duchy of Opole =

Silesian duchy (1172–1202; 1281–1532)

Coordinates: 50°40′25″N 17°55′18″E

Duchy of Opole Księstwo opolskie (Polish) Opolské knížectví (Czech) Herzogtum Oppeln (German)
- 1172–1202; 1281–1532
- Coat of arms

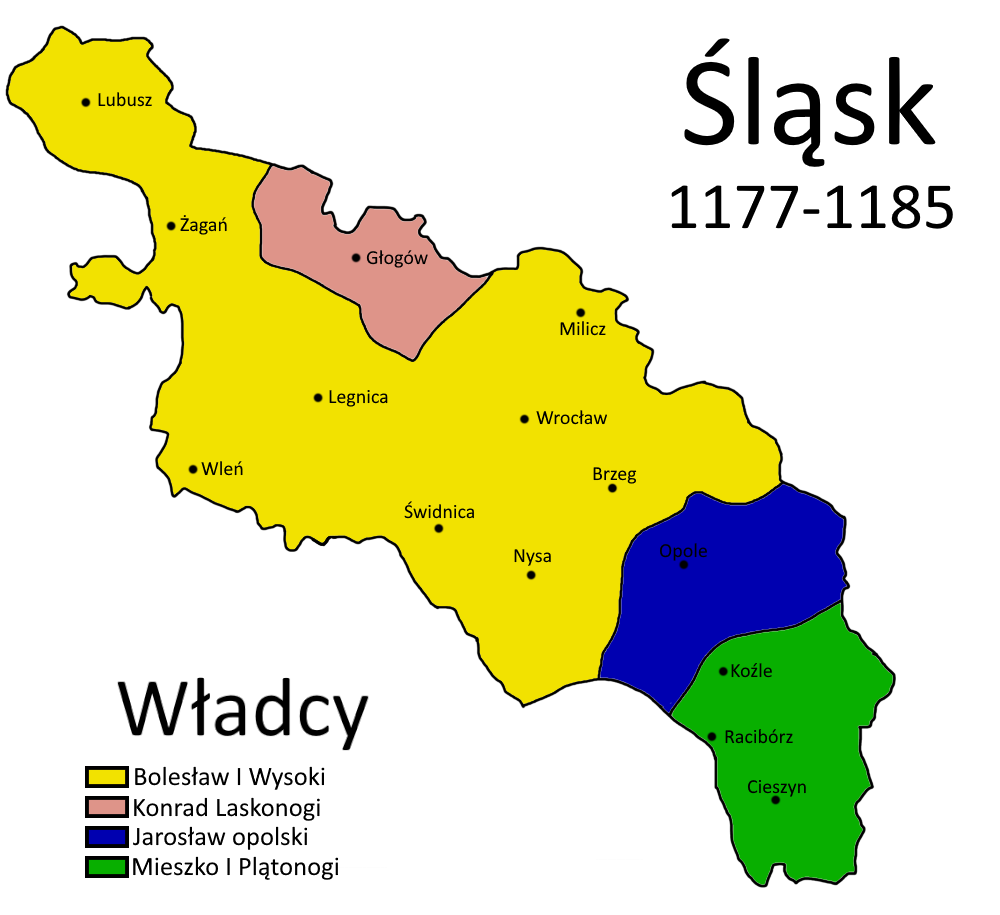
- Silesia in 1177–85: Duchy of Opole Duchy of Racibórz Duchy of Silesia Duchy of Głogów
- Status: Silesian duchy Fiefdom of Bohemia (1291–1306; 1327–1348); Fiefdom of the Bohemian Crown (until 1742); Part of Prussia (1742–1919)
- Capital: Opole
- Demonym: Opolean
- Government: monarchy
- Historical era: Middle Ages
  - Partitioned from Wrocław: 1172
  - United with Racibórz: 1202
  - Split off Racibórz: 1281
  - Vassalized (finally) by Bohemia: 1327
  - Inherited Racibórz: 1521
  - Fell to Bohemia: 1532
  - Held by the Polish House of Vasa: 1645–1666
Preceded by	Succeeded by
Duchy of Silesia	Lands of the Bohemian Crown
- Today part of: Poland

The Duchy of Opole (Polish: Księstwo opolskie; Czech: Opolské knížectví; German: Herzogtum Oppeln) was one of the duchies of Silesia ruled by the branch of Polish Piast dynasty, formed during the medieval fragmentation of Poland into provincial duchies. Its capital was Opole in Upper Silesia.

== History ==
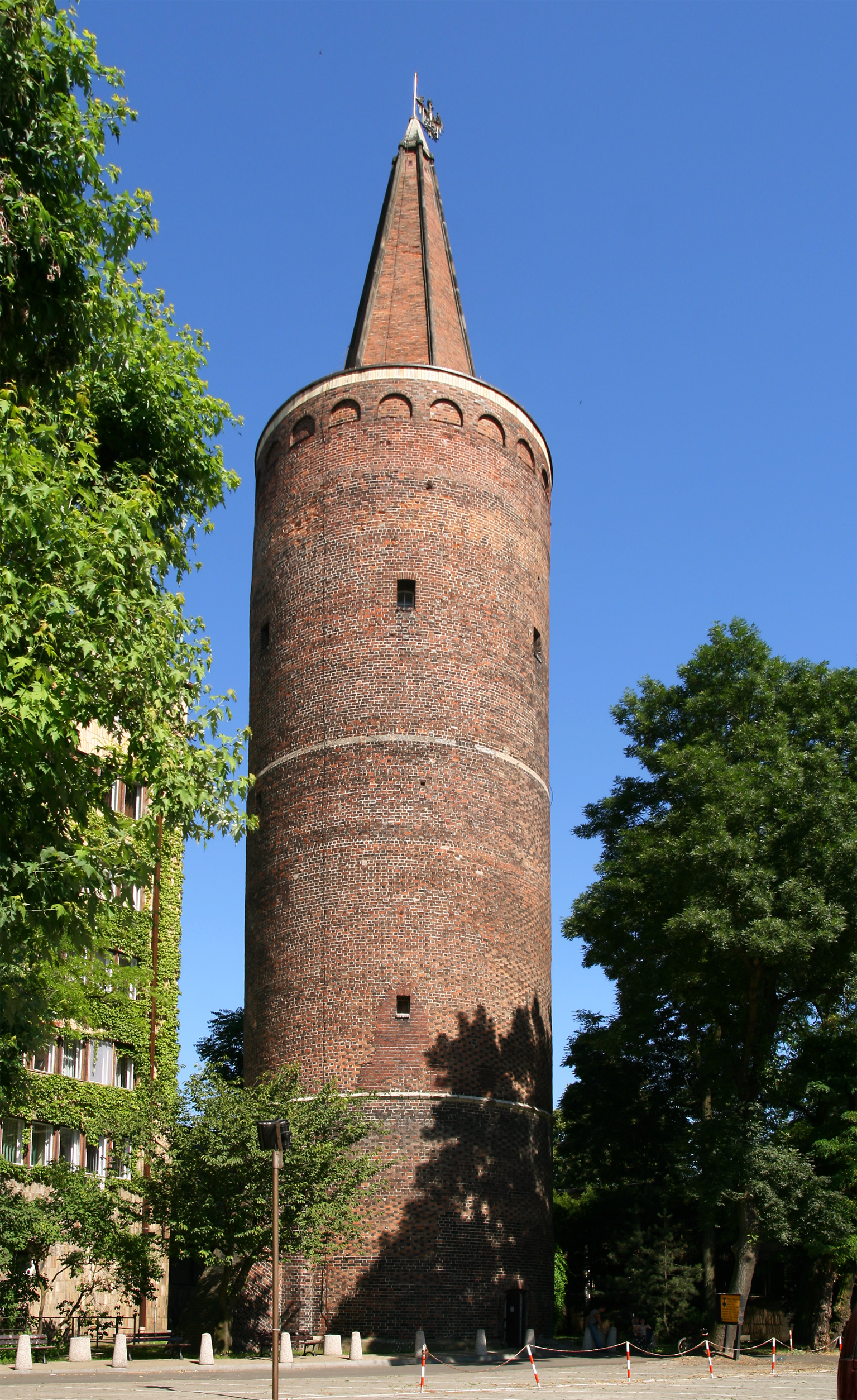
Piast tower called Strażnica (built around 1300) in the historic centre of Opole

Duke Bolesław III Wrymouth had restored Polish fortunes to some extent but having endured terrific internal strife, he decreed in his will (1138) that the Polish kingdom would be better divided into four hereditary principalities for each of his four sons as a kind of family federation. One became Duke of Greater Poland (around Gniezno), another Silesia, another Lesser Poland (around Kraków), another, Masovia. The rising local magnates, dowered with estates, preferred provincial princes. But the division of loyalties among these princes brought on a long period of dynastic struggle, intrigue, and national weakness. By this time Silesia had been divided into sixteen minuscule principalities and was finally annexed by Bohemia. Civil wars followed which encouraged foreign intervention. Boleslaus IV (1146–1173) submitted (1157) as vassal of Frederick I, Holy Roman Emperor. The disputes, however, continued.

Duke Bolesław I the Tall and his younger brother Mieszko I Tanglefoot divided the territory among themselves into the two duchies of Wrocław and Racibórz. Bolesław originally had the intention to bequest the Duchy of Wrocław as a whole to his son of his second marriage Henry I the Bearded, which caused the protest of his eldest son Jarosław. After a long-term dispute in 1172 the Duchy of Opole was formed with Jarosław becoming the first duke. In turn he was obliged to an ecclesiastical career and became Bishop of Wrocław in 1198.

When Duke Jarosław died in 1201, the Opole lands reverted to his still living father Bolesław and were briefly incorporated into the Duchy of Wrocław. Bolesław himself however died shortly afterwards and in 1202 Opole was taken by his brother Duke Mieszko I Tanglefoot of Racibórz, who merged it with his duchy, creating the united Upper Silesian Duchy of Opole and Racibórz.

After the death of Mieszko's grandson Duke Władysław Opolski in 1281, his sons again divided the Duchy of Opole and Racibórz and the Duchy of Opole was recreated for Casimir and his brother Bolko I, contemporaneously with the establishment of the duchies of Cieszyn and Bytom on former Racibórz territory. In 1327 King John the Blind of Bohemia reasserted his influence over the Duchy of Opole in an attempt to stabilise the situation.

The Duchy underwent various future territorial changes, becoming increasingly small until the mid-15th century, when it would start to expand again, resulting in the recreation of the Duchy of Opole and Racibórz under Duke Jan II the Good in 1521. Jan however died without issue in 1532 and the Opole line of the Piasts became extinct, whereafter Opole and Racibórz as feudal fiefdoms reverted to the sovereignty of the Bohemian Crown. It would then fall to Margrave George of Brandenburg-Ansbach from the House of Hohenzollern, who had signed his inheritance treaty with Duke Jan in 1522 with the consent of the Bohemian king Ferdinand I of Habsburg.

Between 1645 and 1666 as part of the Duchy of Opole and Racibórz it was held in feud by the Polish House of Vasa, reverting afterwards to the Habsburg-ruled Bohemian Crown.

After the First Silesian War, it fell to the Kingdom of Prussia under the conditions of the Treaty of Berlin signed in 1742.

== See also ==
- Dukes of Opole
- Dukes of Silesia
- Opole Voivodeship
