= Cyprian (bishop of Wrocław) =

Polish bishop

Cyprian (died 16 November 1207) was a medieval Bishop of Wrocław and Lubusz.

Little is known about his origins, career or his Episcopal work. From 1193 he was Abbot of the Olbin Monastery and in April 1198 became Bishop of Lubusz. In 1201 was elected bishop in Wrocław becoming the first bishop of Wroclaw selected by the Cathedral chapter not directly by the Prince.

He was a close associate and supporter of Silesian Princes Bolesław and Henry the Bearded. With Archbishop of Gniezno, Henryk Kietlicz, he acted as advocate between the warring Piast Princes.

He oversaw the foundation of the monastery in Trzebnica. Tradition attributes the removal of the last pagan places of worship to him. He died 16 November 1207.

Religious titles
| Preceded by Jarosław, Duke of Opole | Bishop of Wrocław; 1201–1207 | Succeeded by Lawrence |
