= Agnes of Babenberg =

Duchess consort of Poland from 1138 to 1146

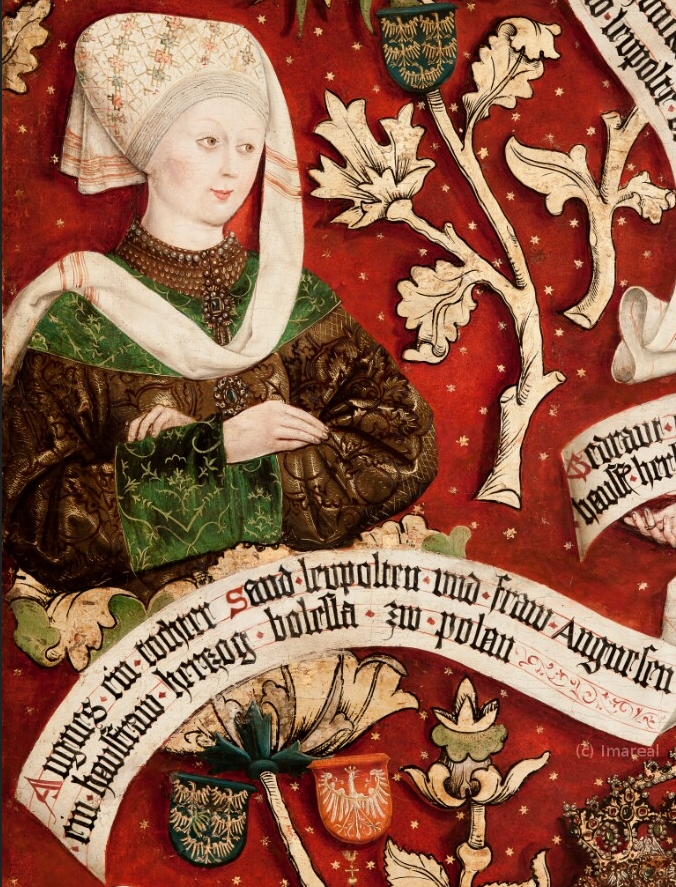
- Portrait in the Babenberg Family Tree Triptych, Klosterneuburg Monastery, Austria

High Duchess consort of Poland
- Tenure: 1138–1146

Duchess consort of Silesia
- Tenure: 1138–1146
- Born: c. 1108/1113
- Died: 24/25 January 1163; Altenburg, Holy Roman Empire
- Burial: Pforta monastery
- Spouse: Władysław II the Exile
- Issue: Bolesław I the Tall; Mieszko I Tanglefoot; Richeza, Queen of Castile; Konrad Spindleshanks
- House: Babenberg
- Father: Leopold III, Margrave of Austria
- Mother: Agnes of Germany

Agnes of Babenberg (Polish: Agnieszka austriacka; c. 1108/13 – 24/25 January 1163) was a scion of the Franconian House of Babenberg and by marriage High Duchess of Poland and Duchess of Silesia.

== Family and personality ==
Agnes was a daughter of Leopold III, Margrave of Austria, and Agnes, daughter of Emperor Henry IV. Through her mother, Agnes was a descendant of the Salian dynasty, which ruled the Holy Roman Empire since 1024 until her maternal uncle, Emperor Henry V, died without issue in 1125. She was the half-sister of Duke Frederick II of Swabia and King Conrad III of Germany, both born from her mother's first marriage with Duke Frederick I of Swabia. Of her full siblings, one sister, Judith, married Marquess William V of Montferrat, and one brother was Bishop Otto of Freising, a renowned medieval chronicler.

According to Wincenty Kadłubek, Polish chronicler and bishop of Kraków (and this opinion is shared by other sources), Agnes was a very ambitious, energetic woman, and proud of her origins. It is no wonder the bishop called her "Tigress" in his Chronica Polonorum.

== Marriage ==
The ruler of Poland, Duke Bolesław Wrymouth, in order to hold his ground against the Empire wanted to obtain a powerful ally against King Lothair III of Germany. He therefore forged an alliance with the Babenbergs and the Hohenstaufen families, who, as relatives of the extinct Salian dynasty, were the natural rivals of Lothair. In order to seal this alliance, a marriage between Bolesław III's eldest son Władysław and Agnes was agreed. The wedding took place around 1125; according to some historians, the couple had already received the Duchy of Silesia from Bolesław III as a gift.

== High Duchess of Poland ==
Bolesław III died on 28 October 1138. In his will, he divided Poland between his sons. As the oldest son, the supreme authority in the country was assigned to Władysław II with the title of high duke (princeps). In addition to Silesia, he received the Seniorate Province (which included Lesser Poland, eastern Greater Poland and western Kuyavia) and the authority over Pomerania. His half-brothers Boleslaw IV, Mieszko III and Henry received hereditary fiefs as junior dukes. In addition, Władysław II would also receive the lands of Łęczyca, then granted by Bolesław III to his widow, Salomea of Berg, for life as her dower and to revert to the Seniorate Province upon her death.

Almost immediately, the high duke began his efforts to unify the country under his rule. Wincenty Kadłubek stated that the confrontation between Władysław II and his half-brothers was mainly instigated by Agnes, who believed that her husband, as the eldest son, had the right to be the sole ruler of the whole country.

In order to strengthen the authority of the high duke, it is believed that Agnes took part in the downfall of one of the most powerful nobles in the country, the voivode Piotr Włostowic, who supported the junior dukes. According to a legend, the capture of Włostowic was thanks to Agnes, because she sent her own retainers to his castle and they captured him during the night. This event was recorded in German contemporary historiography; however, since this story is not confirmed, it not generally accepted by modern historians. Agnes demanded Włostowic's death, but her husband decided instead to make an example of him. Włostowic was blinded, muted and sentenced to exile.

== Deposition and exile ==
The tyrannical rule of Władysław II and Agnes led to many of their subjects switching their allegiance to the junior dukes. In early 1146 the high duke's forces were finally defeated near Poznań. Władysław II escaped to Bohemia, while Agnes and her children remained in Kraków, where for some time they maintained resistance against the junior dukes from the Wawel Castle. However, the attempts to defend the city were unsuccessful and, in the end, the whole family was reunited in exile.

After a short time at the Bohemian court of Duke Vladislaus II, Agnes' half-brother, King Conrad III of Germany, offered his hospitality to the Polish ducal family, who settled at the Kaiserpfalz of Altenburg. At first, it seemed that Władysław II would soon regain power in Poland. A German expedition against the junior dukes was launched in 1146, but due to flooding of the Oder River and the pressures on the German king by the margraves Albert the Bear and Conrad of Meissen, the campaign failed.

The failure of the expedition did not discourage Agnes, who continued with her attempts to restore her husband. She asked for the intervention of Pope Eugenius III, who decided to raise the question in the 1148 Council of Reims, and sent his legate Guy to Poland to obtain the submission of the junior dukes. However, they refused to accept the return of Władysław II, and the pope declared a ban over Poland. The pope's actions had few repercussions thanks for the united support of the Polish church hierarchy for the junior dukes.

In 1152 King Conrad III died and was succeeded by his nephew Frederick Barbarossa. With the accession of this energetic ruler, the hopes of Agnes and Władysław II of returning to Poland were rekindled. With the encouragement of his aunt, the new German king launched an expedition against Poland in 1157. The campaign was a success but unexpectedly Barbarossa did not restore Władysław II to the Polish throne. Instead High Duke Bolesław IV was declared a vassal of Emperor Frederick and was compelled to pay tribute to him. In compensation to Władysław II, he forced Bolesław to promise the restitution of the Silesian duchy to Władysław's sons.

== Death and aftermaths ==
Both Agnes and Władysław II knew that their battle was finally lost. They remained in Altenburg, where Władysław II died on 30 May 1159. Agnes' day of death is generally placed by sources between 24 and 25 January, but the year remained disputed among historians and sources. Certainly she survived her husband, and it is known that she did not return to Silesia with her sons when they were finally restored in their heritage in 1163. Thus, it is believed that Agnes died between 1160 and 1163. She was buried in the Cistercian abbey of Pforta near Naumburg on the Saale river.

== Children ==
Agnes and Wladyslaw had the following children:

1. Bolesław I the Tall (1127 – 8 December 1201).
2. Mieszko I Tanglefoot (1131 – 16 May 1211).
3. Richeza (1140 – 16 June 1185), married firstly in 1152 to Alfonso VII, King of Galicia, Castile and León, secondly in 1162 to Ramon Berenguer II, Count of Provence and thirdly by 1167 to Count Albert III of Everstein.
4. Konrad Spindleshanks (1146/57 – 17 January 1180/90).
5. Albert (c. 1156 - c. 1168/78).

== Sources ==
- Reilly, Bernard F. (1998). The Kingdom of León-Castilla Under King Alfonso VII, 1126 – 1157. Philadelphia: University of Pennsylvania Press. ISBN 9780812234527.
