= Konrad Laskonogi =

Duke of Glogów

- Duke of Głogów
- Coat-of-arms of Silesian Piasts
- Born: 1146/57
- Died: died by 17 January 1190
- Noble family: Silesian Piasts
- Father: Władysław II the Exile
- Mother: Agnes of Babenberg

Konrad Laskonogi (literally Spindleshanks; born 1146/57 – died by 17 January 1190), was a Duke of Głogów since 1177 until his death.

He was the third son of Władysław II the Exile by his wife Agnes of Babenberg, daughter of Margrave Leopold III of Austria. He was named after Conrad III of Germany, half-brother of his mother.

== Life ==
Little is known about Konrad's first years of life. German historian Hermann Grotefend argued that if Conrad was named after his uncle, it means that he was born in Germany, where his parents were expelled in 1146. Epytaphia ducum Slezie (Nagrobki książąt śląskich) called him domicellus. This term means adolescent, but also an unmarried adult man. Polish genealogist Kazimierz Jasiński supposed that is very doubtful that a man around 40 years old could be called adolescent. Jasiński agreed with Grotefend that Conrad was born in Germany. He also stated that age difference between children of the same mother could not be more than 30 years. As Bolesław I the Tall, the oldest brother of Konrad was born in 1127, it means that he was born no later than in 1157.

Konrad was sickly. He probably suffered from paresis of the legs.

He was prepared by his parents for an ecclesiastical career, probably at the Benedictine Abbey of Waldsassen or at the Abbey of Fulda. He was probably still a minor in 1163, when his elder brothers Bolesław I the Tall and Mieszko I Tanglefoot, backed by the Emperor Frederick I Barbarossa, returned to Poland and received the Duchy of Silesia from their uncle High Duke Bolesław IV the Curly. Konrad probably remained in Germany at that time.

Bolesław I the Tall and Mieszko I Tanglefoot first ruled jointly but soon came into conflict with each other and in 1173 divided the Duchy. Bolesław then ruled over the larger part of Lower Silesia including Wrocław and Głogów and Mieszko obtained Racibórz and Cieszyn. When Konrad came of age he return to Silesia and also claimed his rights, nevertheless as the quarrels between the brothers continued, it was not until 1177, when Bolesław I the Tall at the instance of the High Duke Casimir II the Just ceded the newly established Duchy of Głogów to him.

Konrad had never married and had no children. As he is not mentioned after 1178, he may have died shortly afterwards, although some sources ranked his death around 1190. His domains were inherited by his brother Bolesław.

According to older historiography Konrad resigned from his duchy and died on 19 February 1203 as a bishop of Bamberg. This mistake was explained in 1957 by German historian Hans Paschke, who pointed that bishop Konrad von Ergersheim was mistaken with Konrad, bishop of Passau, later duke of Głogów.

== Footnotes ==
Preceded by new creation	Duke of Głogów; 1177–1190	Succeeded by Bolesław I the Tall
