= Henry the Bearded =

High Duke of Poland from 1232 to 1238

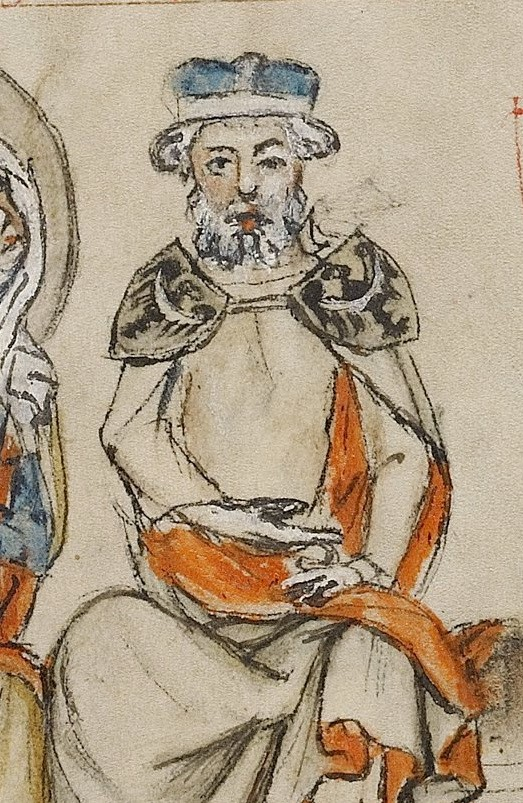
- Henry, as shown in the Hedwig Codex

High Duke of Poland
- Reign: 1232 – 1238
- Predecessor: Konrad I of Masovia
- Successor: Henry II the Pious

Duke of Silesia
- Reign: 1201 – 1238
- Predecessor: Bolesław I the Tall
- Successor: Henry II the Pious
- Born: c. 1165; Głogów, Duchy of Silesia, Poland
- Died: 19 March 1238; Krosno Odrzańskie, Poland
- Burial: Trzebnica Abbey
- Spouse: Hedwig of Andechs
- Issue: Henry II the Pious; Konrad the Curly
- House: Silesian Piasts
- Father: Bolesław I the Tall
- Mother: Christina(?)

Henry the Bearded (Polish: Henryk (Jędrzych) Brodaty, German: Heinrich der Bärtige; c. 1165/1170 – 19 March 1238) was a Polish duke from the Silesian branch of the Piast dynasty. He was Duke of Silesia at Wrocław from 1201, Duke of Kraków and High Duke of all Poland – internally divided – from 1232 until his death. A competent ruler, he supported the development of mining, carried out a monetary reform, granted the first town charters, and attempted to reunite an internally divided Poland.

Henry succeeded his father, Bolesław I the Tall, as Duke of Silesia, and, through a combination of dynastic marriages, military campaigns, political alliances, and territorial acquisitions, he expanded the influence of the Silesian Piasts. In 1202, he became involved in the struggle for control of Kraków and the seniorate province, although his attempts to establish lasting authority over divided Polish lands there were repeatedly challenged by other Piast princes.

A prominent patron of Christian institutions, Henry supported monasteries and churches and promoted the settlement of German-speaking communities in Silesia. His wife, Hedwig of Andechs, later canonized as Saint Hedwig of Silesia, played an important role in his religious and dynastic affairs. Their rule was associated with economic development, the foundation of settlements and cities under Magdeburg Law, and the growing importance of Silesia within Central Europe. Most notably, Złotoryja was the first town in Poland to be granted town privileges in 1211 under Henry.

Henry I died in 1238 and was succeeded by his son, Henry II the Pious, as Duke of Silesia. While he was unable to achieve the lasting reunification of the Polish lands under a single ruler, Henry I's reign played a crucial role in strengthening the territorial position and political influence of the Silesian Piast dynasty. His rule, alongside that of his son, represents a significant phase in the political history of medieval Poland and reflects the broader developments of the period of regional fragmentation.

== Life ==
=== Early career and the loss of Opole ===
Henry was the fourth son of Duke Bolesław I the Tall of Silesia, by his second wife Christina, probably a German. He was born in Głogów, Lower Silesia. Henry's three older brothers Boleslaw, Conrad and John (1174–1190), died. His older half-brother Jarosław of Opole became a priest, possibly because of the scheming of Henry's mother, Christina. Henry became Bolesław's sole heir in 1190. Through his marriage with Hedwig of Andechs (1182–1189), Henry was connected to the rulers of Germany, Hungary, Bohemia, and France.

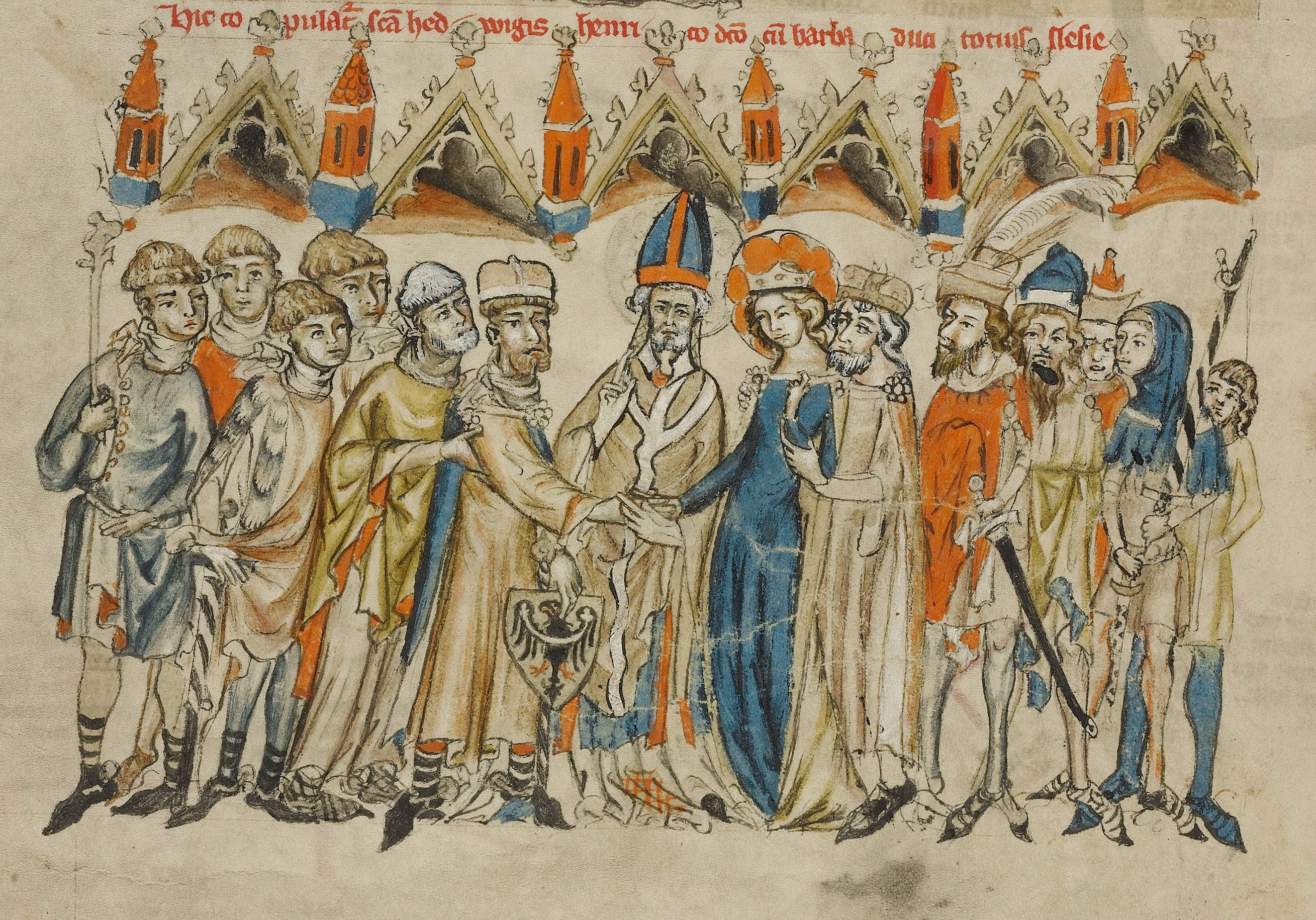
Henry's marriage to Hedwig of Andechs, also known as Saint Hedwig of Silesia

Henry's father, Bolesław I, died on 8 December 1201. Early in 1202, Henry's uncle, Duke Mieszko IV Tanglefoot of Upper Silesia, attacked and took the Duchy of Opole, which had passed from Jarosław's possession into Henry's. Mieszko wanted more than Opole, but was opposed by Archbishop of Gniezno, Henry Kietlicz and the Bishop of Wrocław, Cyprian. They supported Henry because he paid them 1,000 pieces of silver.

=== Relations with the Hohenstaufens, Wittelsbachs, Welfs and Přemyslids ===
When the Holy Roman Empire was in the middle of the struggles between the Staufer and the Welfs, at first, Henry wasn't directly involved in this fight.

After 1207, Henry betrothed his daughter Gertrude to the Pfalzgraf Otto VIII, Count Palatine of Bavaria of the House of Wittelsbach, then a loyal follower of the House of Hohenstaufen. His wife Agnes, of the ducal House of Andechs, was a strong supporter of the Staufer. Henry remained neutral and refused to take part in the conflict between the Holy Roman Empire, the Staufer and the Welfs. Otto VIII murdered the German Hohenstaufen King Philip of Swabia and was executed in 1209, so there was no marriage.

=== Involvement in the politics of the Polish duchies ===
In 1202, the Polish High Duke Mieszko III the Old died. He was from the Greater Polish branch of the royal Piast dynasty. Two opposing groups emerged: 1) Mieszko IV Tanglefoot (Henry's uncle), and Duke Władysław III Spindleshanks of Greater Poland (Mieszko III's son and successor), and 2) Dukes Leszek the White of Sandomierz, Konrad I of Masovia (sons of late High Duke Casimir II the Just), and Władysław Odonic (Władysław III's nephew). Henry once again remained neutral.

Władysław III Spindleshanks had assumed the throne at Kraków, but was deposed in 1206. Leszek became High Duke and Duke of Kraków. The loss of the Seniorate Province caused Władysław III to change his alliance, increasing his presence in West Pomerania. He proposed to Henry an exchange of territories: the Silesian Lubusz Land for the Greater Poland Kalisz region. Henry accepted the offer, but the exchange resulted in political confusion. Władysław Odonic had been expecting to inherit Lubusz and Greater Poland from his uncle Władysław III. Odonic counted on the support of the church, headed by Archbishop Henry Kietlicz of Gniezno. Władysław III had his two opponents, Odonic and the archbishop, exiled. Henry was now in a difficult situation. He owed a debt of gratitude to the archbishop, who helped him at the beginning of his reign, but he decided to support Władysław III. He gave the newly acquired Kalisz to Odonic, except for Poznań, causing a temporary rift between Henry and Władysław III. In 1208, the relationship was mended during a meeting in Głogów.

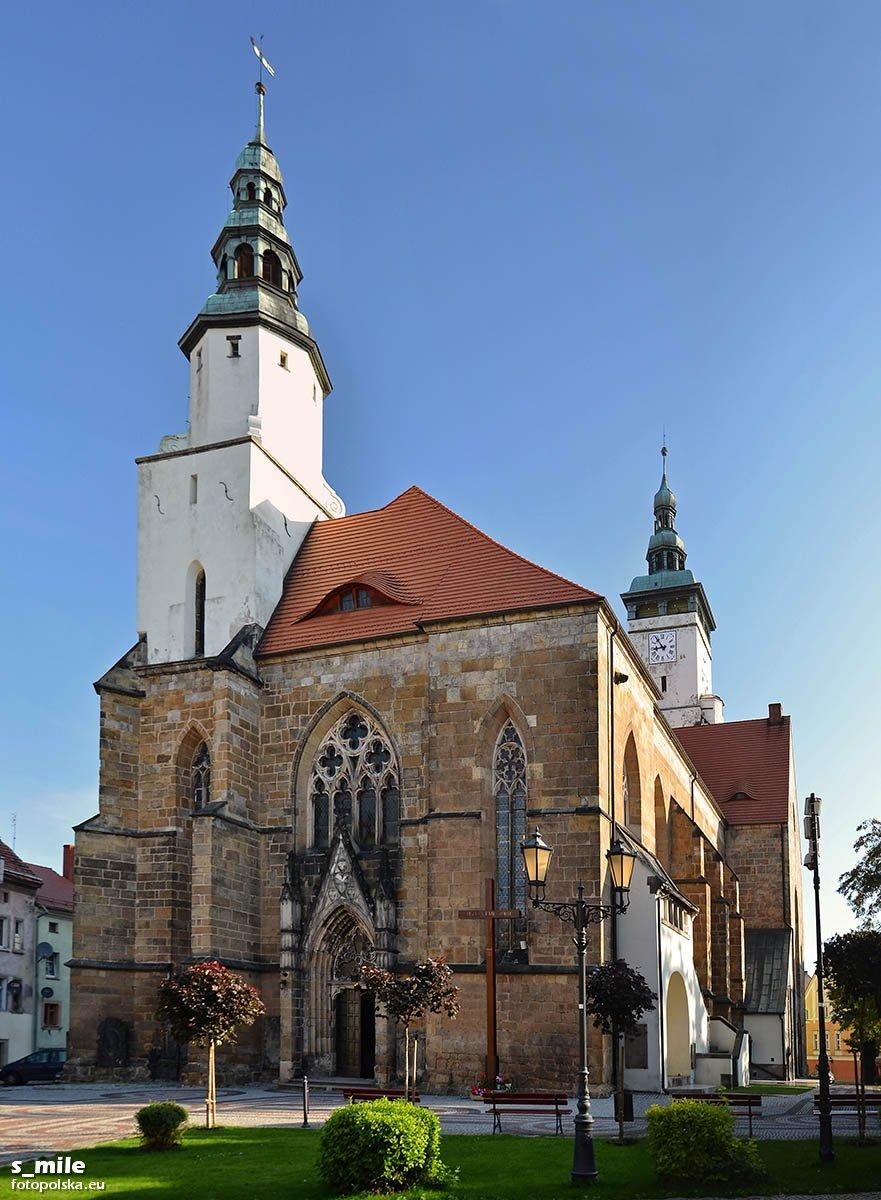
St. Mary's Church in Złotoryja, founded by Henry the Bearded in the early 13th century

In 1210, Pope Innocent III excommunicated High Duke Leszek I. Mieszko IV Tanglefoot quickly conquered Kraków and took the title of High Duke. The excommunication bull was issued at the request of an anonymous Duke of Silesia, probably Henry (because Mieszko IV used the title Duke of Racibórz-Opole). The situation became quite confused and no one was sure who held the real power.

Archbishop Henry Kietlicz, who had returned from exile some time before, called the Synod of Borzykowa to try to find a solution to the situation. Henry, and the lesser Dukes Leszek I, Konrad I, and Władysław Odonic were present. Leszek and the other Piast princes bestowed a gift on the clergy, ensuring the integrity of the bishop's territorial possessions (the privilege wasn't signed by Henry or Władysław III, but they did comply with its provisions). Mieszko IV wasn't present in Borzykowa. While the other Dukes were in Borzykowa, Mieszko IV and his army invaded Kraków and took the capital without a fight. Mieszko IV only held Kraków for a year. Henry, although he was now the oldest of the lesser Dukes, did nothing. Leszek I the White returned to Kraków without any major difficulties.

After the papal bull affair, Henry supported peace and cooperation with High Duke Leszek and Duke Władysław III of Greater Poland. The pact was established in 1217 in a meeting in Danków, and then a year later in Sądowel. Each member of this Piast triumvirate (later including Leszek's younger brother Konrad of Masovia) brought some mutual benefits to the alliance. Władysław's inclusion brought about an immediate restitution of Lubusz and Leszek's formal sovereignty over the rest of the country. Over the next few years, the three dukes cooperated.

The main motive for the treaty between the three was the crusading expeditions against the pagan Baltic Old Prussians. These crusades, in 1222 and 1223, both failed despite the vast financial outlay. Henry then proposed bringing a contingent of Teutonic Knights to Poland. Duke Konrad I of Masovia put out the call and the knights entered Poland in 1226.

=== The First War of Lubusz ===
Henry resigned his claim to Kraków because Margrave Konrad II of Lusatia seized Lubusz Land. Duke Władysław III gained possession of Lubusz in 1206, but lost it soon after. The possession of Lubusz directly affected Henry's sovereignty and he sent his forces to the Polish western border. Initially, he tried to settle the dispute peacefully, sending ambassadors to the court of Emperor Otto IV at Altenburg to obtain the return of Lubusz to Silesia. They returned without a response, and Henry organized an armed expedition. No military action was needed. On 6 May 1210, Margrave Konrad II died, and Henry took Lubusz and the Lusatian town of Gubin, which he held until 1218.

=== The Attempt to gain Kraków in 1225 and the struggles over Lubusz ===
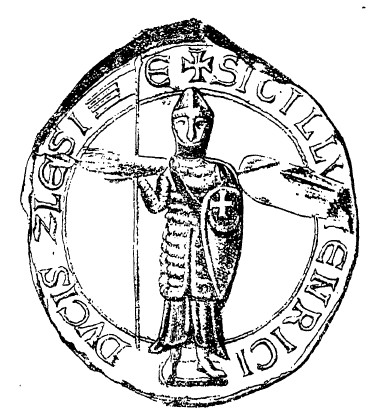
Henry's personal seal

In 1223, the Piast alliance was finally broken. In Greater Poland, Władysław Odonic and his brother-in-law, Duke Świętopełk II of Pomerelia took Ujście. Disputes with Władysław III effectively prevented the continuation of the treaties. In 1225, Henry broke the treaty and entered Kraków. When Landgrave Louis IV of Thuringia attacked Lubusz, Henry retreated from Kraków.

The struggles for Lubusz continued intermittently until 1230, when Margrave Louis IV's successor Henry Raspe resigned his rights over Lubusz in 1229 and sold his claim to the Magdeburg Archbishop Albert I of Käfernburg. Henry was finally able to add this strategically important area to his duchy, although he did so without the consent of Duke Władysław III of Greater Poland. Henry also managed to obtain another asset: a castle in Cedynia, conquered after a local conflict with Duke Barnim I of Pomerania.

=== The Congress of Gąsawa. Death of Leszek I the White ===
In 1227, Leszek I the White organised an assembly of Piast Dukes at Gąsawa to settle territorial disputes and the actions of Duke Świętopełk II. Władysław Odonic and Henry supported Leszek and his brother Konrad of Masovia. Władysław III of Greater Poland did not go to Gąsawa. Duke Świętopełk II, a member of the Pomerelian Samborides dynasty, had declared himself independent from Polish vassalage. The High Duke demanded a serious reprimand for Świętopełk, or his complete removal from the duchy. Świętopełk II (probably with the help of Władysław Odonic) attacked first, at Gąsawa. On 23 November 1227, Leszek the White and Henry were trapped in an ambush. Leszek was killed and Henry was seriously wounded. Peregrinus of Wiesenburg threw himself on Henry, saving Henry's life. A new power struggle for the Polish throne began.

=== Henry, Governor of Krakow ===
Leszek I the White left a one-year-old son, Bolesław, and the Duke of Greater Poland, Władysław III, saw an opportunity to retake Kraków and the title of High Duke under the guise of regency. The Lesser Polish nobles sided with Leszek's brother, Duke Konrad I of Masovia. In the Duchy of Sandomierz Bolesław was declared the rightful heir under the regency of his mother Grzymisława of Łuck, with the help of local nobles. In Poland, Władysław III had the upper hand in the fight for Kraków, especially after the Congress of Cienia Pierwsza near Kalisz on 5 May 1228, where he granted several privileges to the church and promised to respect the old laws. Complications arose when his nephew Władysław Odonic rebelled against him. High Duke Władysław III focused his attention on Greater Poland and Henry was elected to rule Kraków as a Governor of the High Duke, not as High Duke, in recognition of his military support of Władysław III. The High Duke also promised that Henry and his descendants were to be the heirs of Greater Poland.

=== Loss of Lesser Poland and imprisonment ===
After Leszek's death, a war between Henry and Duke Konrad I of Masovia erupted in 1228. Initially, Henry was successful as he repelled Konrad's forces at the Battles of Międzybórz, Skała and Wrocieryż (all in Lesser Poland). Then the situation changed drastically. Henry, a strong supporter of High Duke Władysław III, had difficulty ruling the Kraków nobility. Henry was governing both his Silesian Duchy and Kraków, and some Kraków nobles were not satisfied with the outcome of Henry's ruling, as mostly not used to his heavy-handedness in politics.

In 1229, Henry met with Konrad in Spytkowice. During mass, Konrad's knights took Henry prisoner and wounded several of his men. Henry was imprisoned in the Płock Castle, and Henry II the Pious, Henry's eldest surviving son and heir, became regent of the duchy.

Konrad I of Masovia marched against Greater Poland. He was defeated at the walls of Kalisz, but later he managed a victory over Władysław Odonic, the senior sovereign of Greater Poland. Władysław III escaped to Upper Silesian Racibórz, while Konrad entered Kraków and took the title of High Duke. Henry II was able to maintain Silesia's independence, and he prepared an armed expedition against Lesser Poland.

=== Konrad I and the intervention of Duchess Hedwig ===
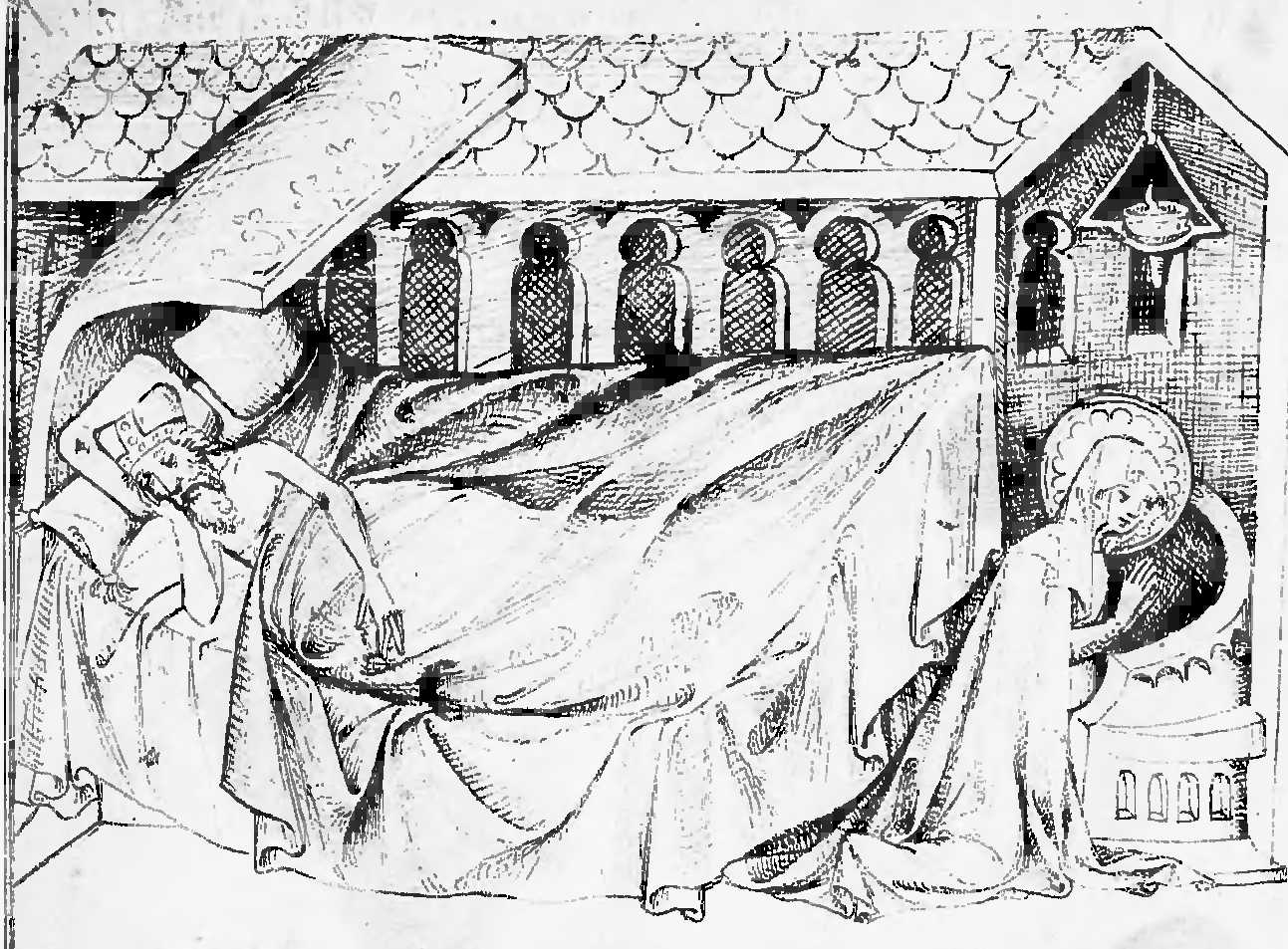
An intimate depiction of Henry and his wife Hedwig in the Hedwig Codex

The real help for Henry I's Hedwig of Andechs went to Płock to speak to Konrad. Konrad decided to release Henry if he renounced his rights to Kraków. The Pope later freed him of his promise, as it was obtained under duress.

Meanwhile, the lesser nobles were finding Konrad's rule harsh. Konrad took the Duchy of Sandomierz from young Bolesław V, giving it to his own son, Bolesław. Henry and Władysław III Spindleshanks planned a military expedition to recover Greater Poland.

=== Death of Władysław III Spindleshanks. Henry, High Duke of Poland ===
The expedition against Konrad, undertaken in 1231, ended in a defeat at the walls of Gniezno; but, luckily for Henry, Władysław III died unexpectedly in Środa Śląska, killed by a German girl whom he tried to rape. As he had no issue, his only heir in Greater Poland was Henry. However, his authority in these areas was immediately contested. At first, Henry decided to take care of the fate of Lesser Poland, especially after the death of his cousin Duke Casimir I of Opole and the minority of his sons Mieszko II the Fat and Władysław Opolski, both under the guardianship of their mother Viola. He decided to take the regency of Opole on behalf of the infant Dukes, in view of the strategic location of their Duchy on his way to Kraków, and also, they certainly helped him to fight. But the most important card in the next conflict wasn't in the hands of Henry and Konrad, but the Lesser Poland noble House of Griffin who decided to support the Silesian Duke. Not without significance was the support which Henry gave – when he was Governor of Kraków – to Grzymisława of Łuck, widow of Leszek I the White; fearing for the future of the inheritance of her infant son Bolesław V, she surrendered the regency of his Duchy of Sandomierz to Henry. Konrad obviously didn't intend to fight with the enormous popularity of Henry's government in both Silesia and Lesser Poland. In 1232, Henry entered Kraków and was proclaimed High Duke and overlord of Poland, and with this, he finally recovered for his Silesian Piast dynasty the title and power which his grandfather Władysław II the Exile had lost in 1146.

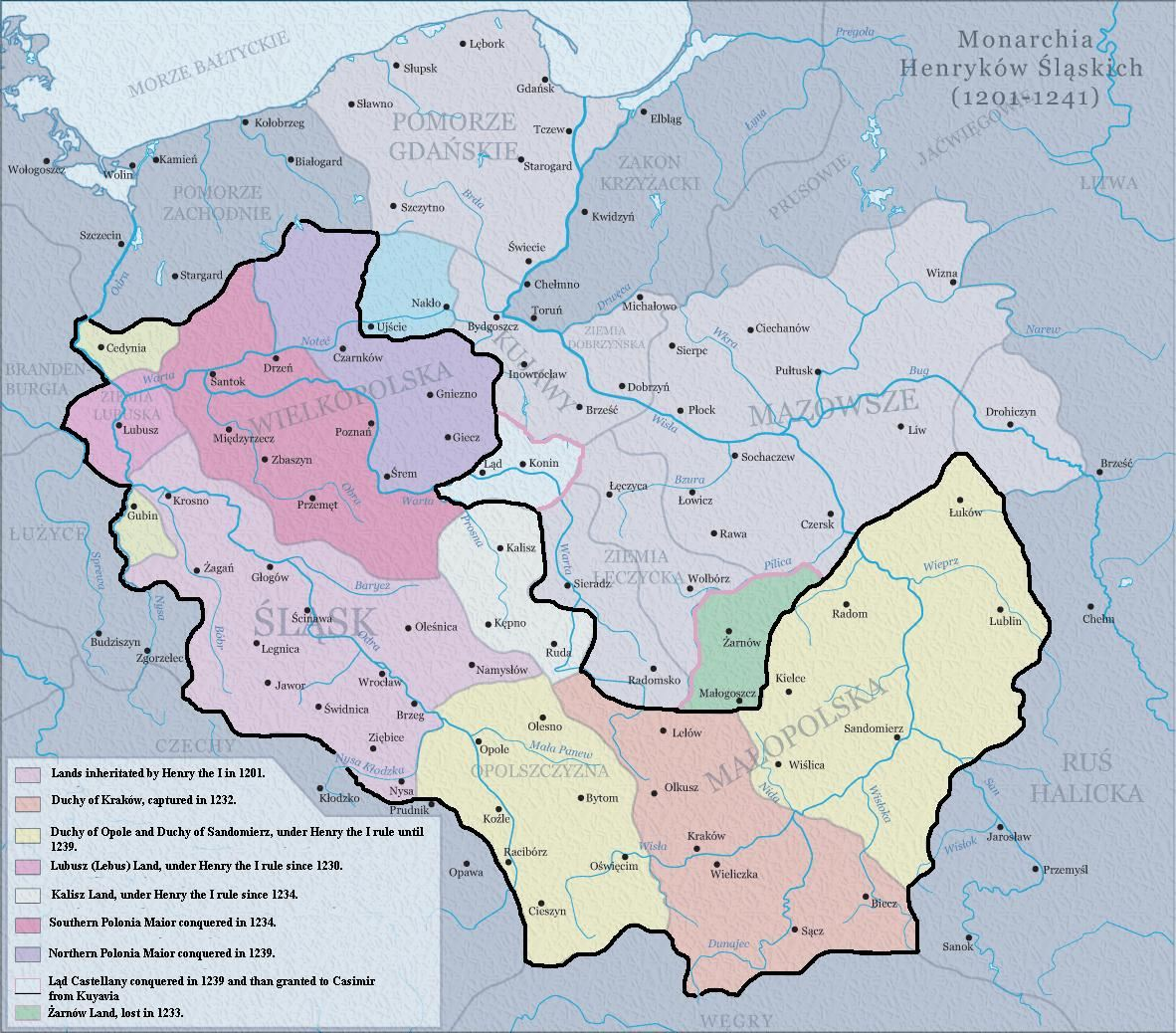
Monarchy of the Silesian Henries

=== First Attempt to gain Greater Poland. Precarious settlement with Konrad of Masovia ===
In 1232, Henry also had an opportunity to gain Greater Poland and launched an offensive against Władysław Odonic, who was also a claimant to this land. The invasion was a failure, however, as a result of the inaction of the Silesian nobility and support from the Church of Odonic. In his war for Lesser Poland, however, he had a complete success. In 1233, Henry and Konrad of Masovia signed a treaty in Chełm. Under the terms of this agreement, he had to resign any pretension over the Lesser Poland lands of Łęczyca and Sieradz, but in return received recognition of his rule over Kraków and the title of High Duke. Also, Henry was confirmed in the regency of Sandomierz on behalf of Bolesław V, a post which Konrad tried to obtain after he ordered the imprisonment of the infant Duke and his mother. Only thanks to the Gryfici's efforts, Bolesław and Grzymislawa could escape and return to their lands. The struggles over Lesser Poland continued, however, until Henry's death.

=== The Second War with Władysław Odonic for Władysław III's inheritance ===
In the summer of 1234, Henry the Bearded decided to re-intervene in Greater Poland. This time, the campaign was totally different from the expedition of two years earlier. Above all, it was because Władysław Odonic lost the support of the nobility, giving part of the royal prerogatives to the Archbishop of Gniezno, Pełka. The success was complete and Odonic, wanting to save his power and convinced by the Archbishop, agreed to make an agreement with Henry: he received the half of Greater Poland up to the Warta River, from Kalisz and Poznań; shortly after, he installed there his son and heir, Henry II the Pious, as a Duke. On the other hand, in Lesser Poland, the borders were less secure. The military mutual support between Henry and Odonic was tested in 1235, when Henry managed to recover Wladyslaw's castle in Śrem, in defense of which Borzivoj, son of the deposed Duke Diepold II of Bohemia was killed.

The control of Opole was vital to Henry because this territory, through which all major commercial routes from Wrocław to Kraków were made, was extremely strategically important. In 1234, Henryk decided to separate (under his authority) between the Upper Silesian co-Dukes Mieszko II and Władysław the Ziemia wieluńska as the common frontier, in return for which he assumed direct control over Opole.

=== Efforts to obtain the Royal Crown. Attempt to secure his son's succession ===
The conquest of Greater Poland caused later Polish historians to call Henry King of all Poland and the most powerful Piast Prince of his time. Unfortunately, this wasn't consistent with his real territorial and political state. Actually, each principality was an independent title, and only in Lower Silesia was his authority strong enough not to worry about his succession. The continuous rebellions of Konrad of Masovia and Władysław Odonic forced Henry in 1234 to designate his son Henry II the Pious as the heir to the throne. After that, Henry was styled Duke of Silesia and Kraków, and his son Duke of Silesia and Greater Poland. He also made an agreement with the Lesser Polish nobility, who could assure the succession of his son. In order to achieve full protection of the possession of Kraków in his bloodline, Henry began efforts towards the coronation of his son as the King of Poland. To this end, he established contacts with the Holy Roman Emperor, Frederick II of Hohenstaufen. However, the increasing conflicts with the church and his own death prevented this idea.

=== Internal politics ===
The black crownless eagle of the Silesian Piasts

In internal politics, Henry maintained the power of the other Piast Dukes under his control. In order to neutralise the growing power of the nobility, he sought to promote Knighthood. Also, he started to restrict the role of land officials, especially chastellains. The complete elimination of the nobility was impossible, and for this, Henry based their government on the support of noble families, like the Gryfici.

The relationship with the Church wasn't good all the time. In many cases, Henry decided to give concessions, but in the end, in one way or another, the conflict arose again. At the end of his life, the conflicts were even more complicated.

During his reign, Henry also improved the economy and infrastructure of his lands by supporting the immigration of German settlers (Ostsiedlung), mainly from the home of his wife, Franconia and Bavaria. Although it is alleged that this policy contributed to the significant Germanisation of Silesia, some historians believe that it was a common fact during the 13th century and Henry was misunderstood as a result of this. Colonisation of Germans didn't cover only Silesia (which prospered considerably thanks to that), but also a dozen other towns or villages in his duchy; in consequence, Henry had to create new town laws for the new foreigners; the first was granted in 1211 in Złotoryja.

=== Death ===
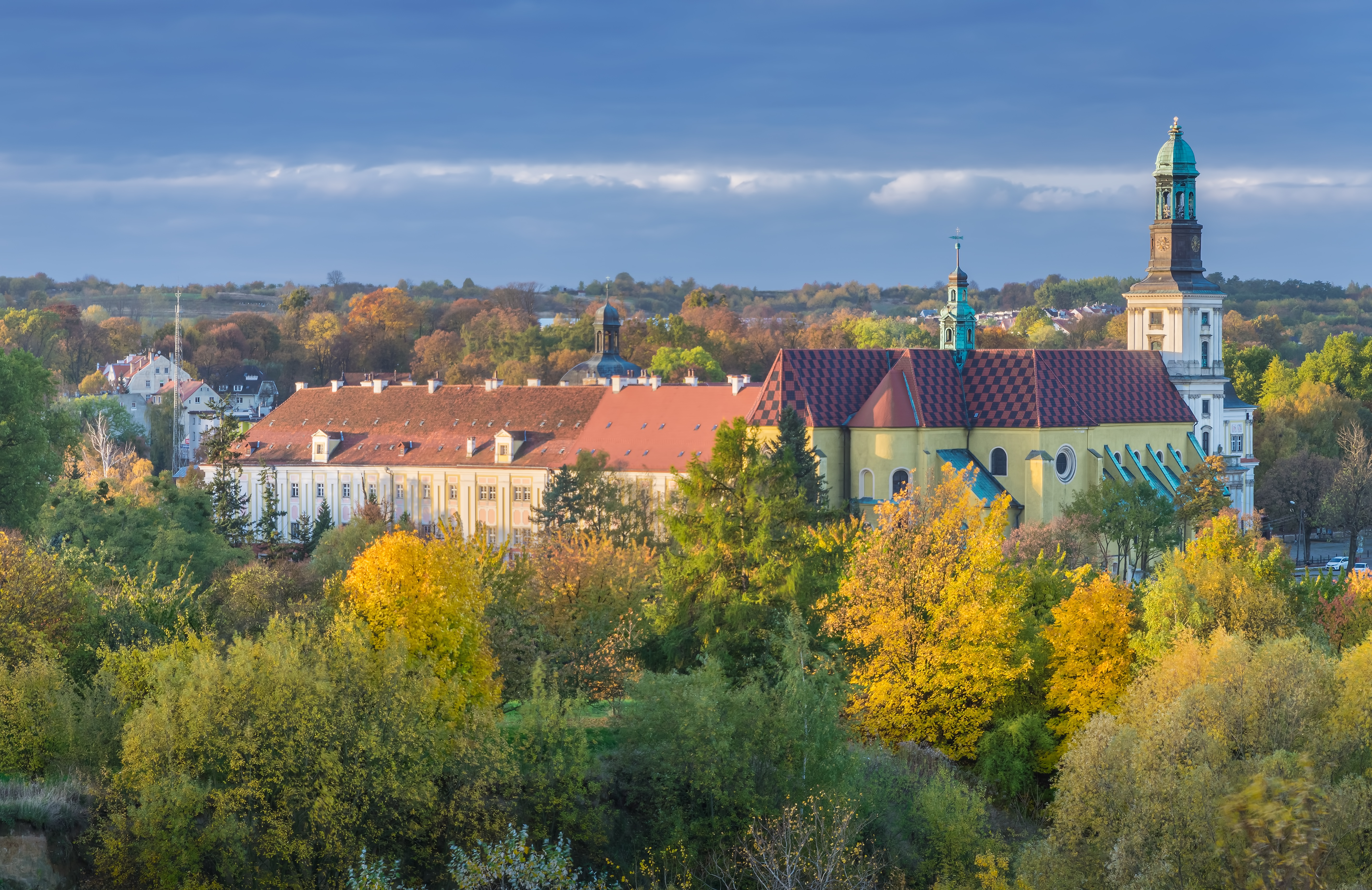
Sanctuary of St. Jadwiga, Trzebnica, founded by Henry the Bearded, place of his burial

Henry died in 1238 in Krosno Odrzańskie and was buried in the Cistercian church of Trzebnica, which he had founded in 1202 on the request of his wife.

== Assessment and legacy ==
Henry the Bearded is considered by historians as one of the most prominent Piast Princes from the period of Poland's feudal fragmentation. However, all his work was destroyed only three years after his death due to a completely unexpected event; the Mongolian invasions. In general, historians agree that if the disaster at the Battle of Legnica had never happened, Poland would have been united in the middle of the 13th century and avoided the territorial losses that occurred. As a capable politician, Henry managed to make Silesia one of the most powerful states of fragmented Poland, and also tried to maintain peace in Greater and Lesser Poland during a period of considerable changes in Western Europe. One contemporary chronicler called him An honest man who only thought to be useful to his people. His personal emblem was a white inverted cross in the middle of the arc, in the form of a white and black eagle on the wings; this remained as the emblem of Silesia.

== Marriage and issue ==
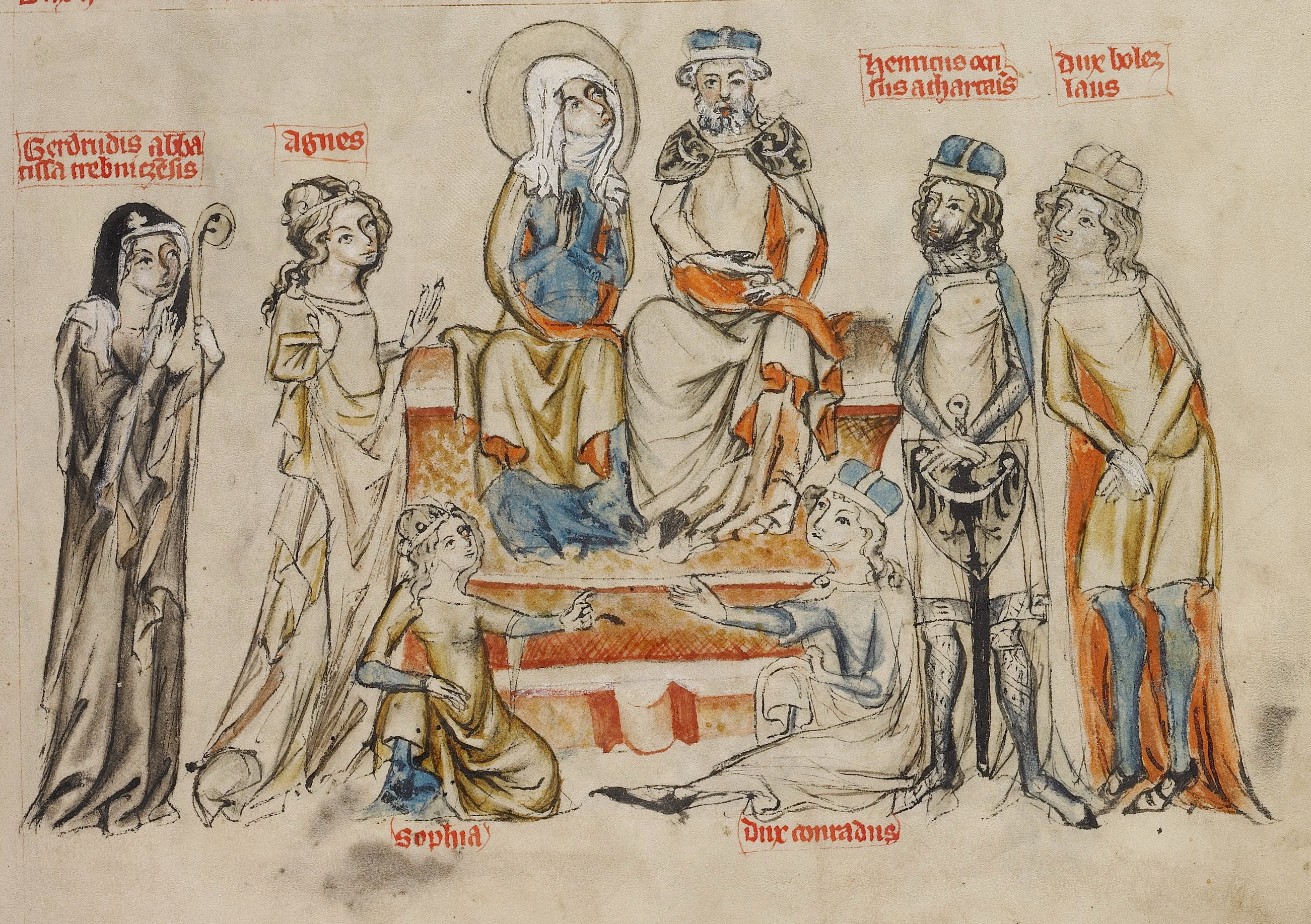
Henry the Bearded with his family. In the center sit: Henry and his wife Hedwig, from left stand: Gertrude, Agnes, Henry II the Pious and Bolesław; at the bottom sit: Sophie and Konrad the Curly.

By 1188, Henry married Hedwig of Silesia (ca. 1174 – Trzebnica Abbey, 15 October 1243), daughter of Duke Berthold IV of Merania. They had seven children:

1. Agnes (c. 1190 – before 11 May 1214);
2. Bolesław (c. 1191 – 10 September 1206/1208);
3. Henry II the Pious (c. 1196 – killed in battle, Legnica, 9 April 1241);
4. Konrad the Curly (c. 1198 – Czerwony Kosciol, 4 September 1213);
5. Sophie (c. 1200 – before 22/23 March 1214);
6. Gertrude (c. 1200 – Trzebnica, 6/30 December 1268), Abbess of Trzebnica;
7. A son [Władysław?] (before 25 December 1208 – 1214/17).

== See also ==
- History of Poland (966–1385)
- Dukes of Silesia

== Bibliography ==
- Davies, Norman (1982). God's Playground: A History of Poland. Vol. I: The Origins to 1795. Columbia University Press. ISBN 978-0231128179.
- Maciorowski, Mirosław; Maciejewska, Beata (2018). Władcy Polski. Historia na nowo opowiedziana [Rulers of Poland. The history retold] (in Polish). Warszawa: Agora. ISBN 978-83-268-2720-4.
- Henryk Brodaty (Śląski)

Henry the Bearded Silesian Piasts Born: ~1165 Died: 19 May 1238
Preceded by Bolesław I the Tall	Duke of Silesia (Wrocław); 1201 – 1238	Succeeded by Henry II the Pious
Preceded by Bolesław I the Tall	Duke of Opole; 1201 – 1202	Succeeded by Mieszko I Tanglefoot
Preceded by Władysław III Spindleshanks	Duke of Kalisz; 1206 – 1207	Succeeded by Władysław Odonic
Preceded by Władysław Odonic	Duke of Kalisz; 1234	Succeeded by Mieszko II the Fat and Władysław Opolski
Preceded by Konrad I	High Duke of Poland; 1232 – 1238	Succeeded by Henry II the Pious
Preceded by Władysław Odonic	Duke of Greater Poland (Only in the Southwest); 1234 – 1238	Succeeded by Henry II the Pious
