= Władysław II the Exile =

High Duke of Poland from 1138 to 1146

High Duke of Poland
- Reign: 1138 – 1146
- Predecessor: Bolesław III Wrymouth
- Successor: Bolesław IV the Curly

Duke of Silesia
- Reign: 1138 – 1146
- Successor: Bolesław IV the Curly
- Born: 1105; Kraków, Kingdom of Poland
- Died: 30 May 1159 (aged 54); Altenburg, Holy Roman Empire
- Burial: Pegau monastery
- Spouse: Agnes of Babenberg
- Issue: Bolesław I the Tall; Mieszko IV Tanglefoot; Richeza, Queen of Castile; Konrad Spindleshanks
- House: Piast dynasty Silesian Piasts (founder)
- Father: Bolesław III Wrymouth
- Mother: Zbyslava of Kiev

Władysław II the Exile (Polish: Władysław II Wygnaniec; 1105 – 30 May 1159) was the high duke of Poland and duke of Silesia from 1138 until his expulsion in 1146. He is the progenitor of the Silesian Piasts.

== Governor of Silesia ==
He was the eldest son of Duke Bolesław III Wrymouth, sole ruler of Poland since 1107, by his first wife Zbyslava, a daughter of Sviatopolk II of Kiev. As Władysław was the firstborn son, his father decided to involve him actively in the government of the country. Some historians believe that Bolesław III gave Władysław the district of Silesia before his own death, in order to create a hereditary fief for his eldest descendants.

Around 1125 Władysław married Agnes of Babenberg, daughter of Margrave Leopold III of Austria; this union gave him a close connection with the Holy Roman Empire and the Kingdom of Germany: Agnes by her mother was a granddaughter of Emperor Henry IV and a half-sister of the Franconian duke Conrad III of Hohenstaufen, the later King of Germany. Thanks to Władysław, Silesia was saved during the wars of 1133–1135 with Bohemia: he stopped the destruction of the major areas of his district after the Bohemian forces crossed the Oder river.

In 1137, during the Whitsun meeting with Duke Soběslav I of Bohemia at Niemcza (other sources mention Kłodzko), in which several disputed matters were decided, Władysław stood as godfather in the baptism of the youngest son of Soběslav, the future Duke Wenceslaus II.

== High Duke of Poland ==
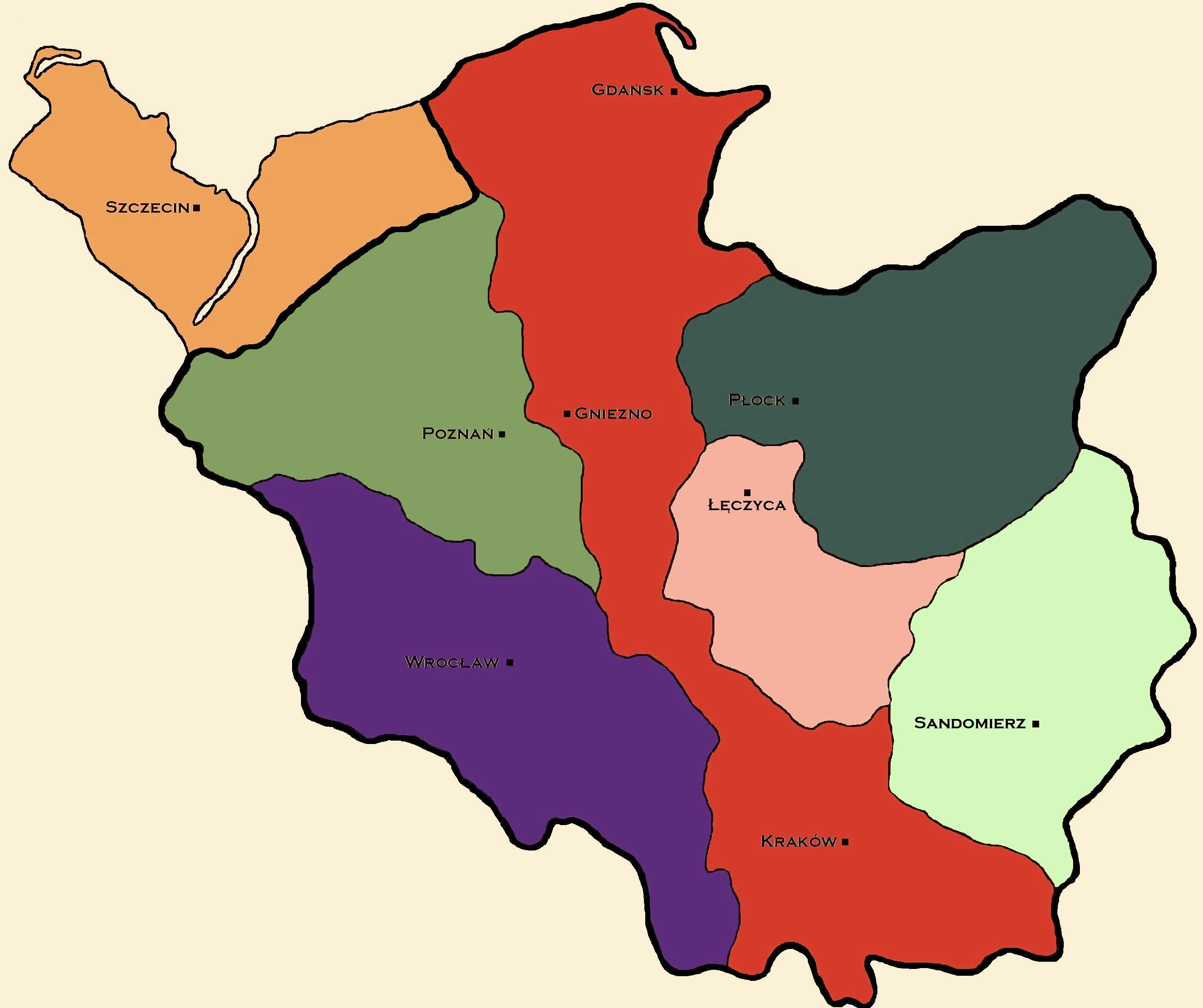
Poland in 1138: Seniorate Province (with Pomerelia) in red, Silesia in violet

Duke Bolesław III died on 28 October 1138. In the Testament of Bolesław III Wrymouth, he sought to maintain the unity under the Polish crown of the conquered neighbouring lands as well as prevent inheritance conflicts among his sons. He therefore determined a kind of mitigated primogeniture principle: as the oldest son, the supreme authority in the country was assigned to Władysław with the title of a High Duke (Princeps). In addition to Silesia, he received the central Seniorate Province, stretching from Lesser Poland at Kraków to eastern Greater Poland and western Kuyavia, as well as the authority over the Pomerelian lands at Gdańsk on the Baltic Sea. His younger half-brothers Bolesław IV the Curly and Mieszko III received the eastern Duchy of Masovia (composed of Masovia with eastern Kuyavia) and the western Duchy of Greater Poland (the remaining parts of Greater Poland with Lubusz Land) respectively, each as hereditary fiefs.

Upon the death of Bolesław's widow Salomea of Berg, Władysław would also receive her dower at Łęczyca (Łęczyca Land and Sieradz Land), which had to revert to the Seniorate. On the other hand, he was obliged to provide his youngest half-brother Henry with the lands of Sandomierz when he would come of age (though only for life). The district, however, was not separated from the Seniorate until 1146. The youngest of his half-brothers, the later High Duke Casimir II the Just was not assigned any province; it is speculated that he was born after Bolesław III's death.

At the time of the death of his father, Władysław was already an adult, with many years of marriage and at least one surviving son, Bolesław I the Tall, born in 1127 (the date of birth of the second son, Mieszko IV Tanglefoot, is still debatable and varies between 1130 and 1146). Following the examples of his predecessors Bolesław I Chrobry in 992, Mieszko II Lambert in 1032, and his own father in 1106, the High Duke almost immediately tried to restore the unity of the country. Given his life experience and military leadership, it was generally expected that in the end, he would be successful.

== First conflicts with junior dukes ==
The disputes of Władysław with his stepmother, Salomea and his half-brothers began openly in 1141, when the Dowager Duchess, without the knowledge and consent of the High Duke, commenced to divide her Łęczyca province between her sons. Also, she tried to resolve the marriage of her youngest daughter Agnes and thus to find a suitable ally for her sons. The most appropriate candidate for a son-in-law had to be one of the sons of the Grand Prince Vsevolod II of Kiev. After hearing the news about the events in Łęczyca, Władysław decided to make a quick response, as a result of which the Grand Prince of Kiev not only broke all his pacts with the Junior Dukes, but also arranged the betrothal of his daughter Zvenislava to Władysław's eldest son Bolesław. The wedding took place one year later, in 1142.

His ties with the Kievan Rus' benefited him during 1142–1143, when Władysław decided to fight against the districts of his brothers. Władysław's victory was beyond dispute, being backed by his alliances with the Rus', Bohemia and the Holy Roman Empire.

== Włostowic affair ==
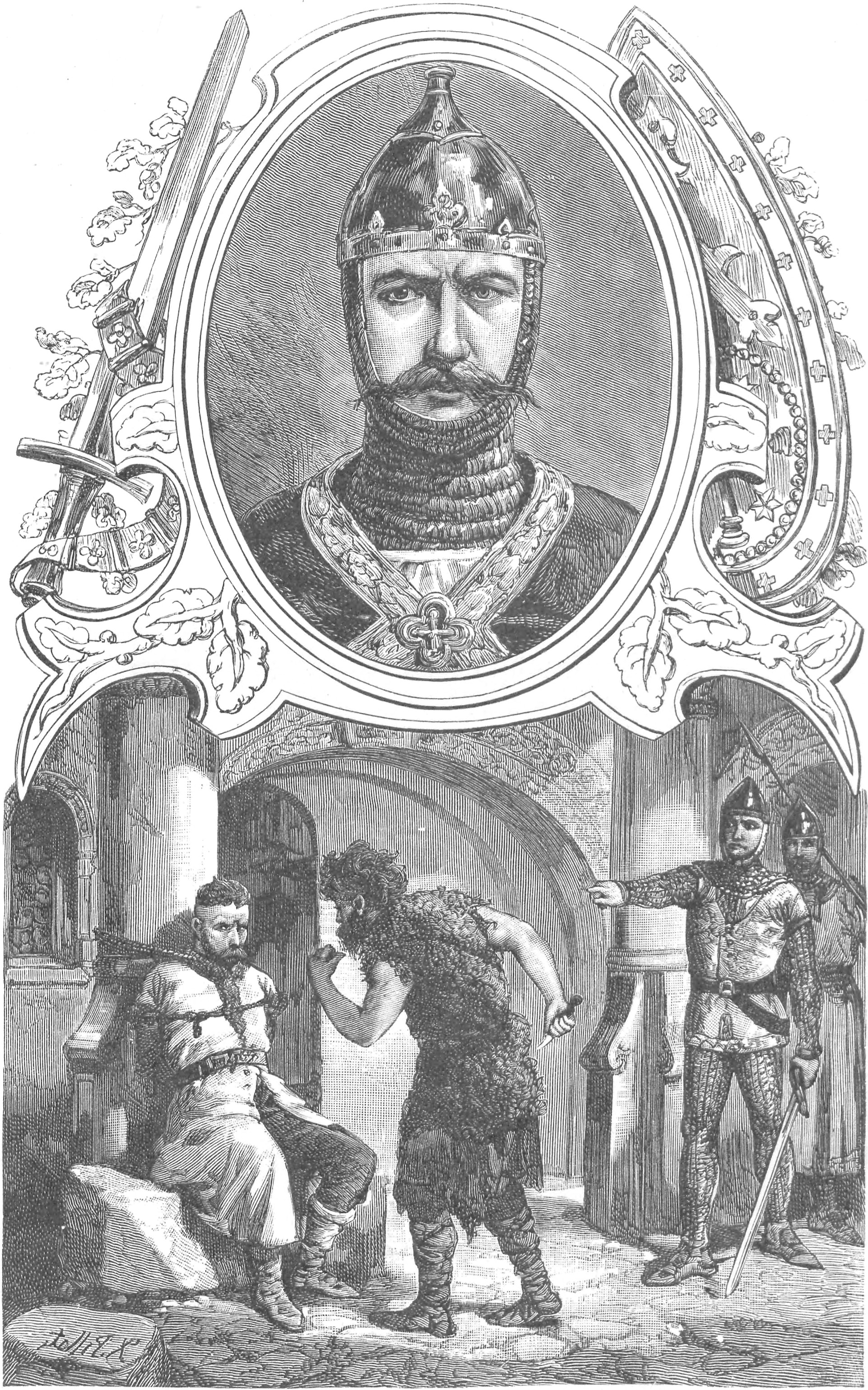
Władysław II as depicted in 1888 by Ksawery Pillati

During Wladyslaw's reign, the Silesian voivode (count palatine) Piotr Włostowic had the greatest and most decisive impact. A firm follower of Duke Bolesław III, he had soon acquired enormous political significance in the country, covering the most important court offices. In his prerogative as voivode, he had the right to appoint officials in local authorities across Poland, including in the areas of the Junior Dukes, which made him the person whose decisions determined the fate of the state. In view of the conflict between her sons and Władysław looming ahead, Bolesław's wife, Salomea of Berg, intrigued against him, whereafter Włostowic had to resign and was replaced by one of her minions. When Władysław succeeded his father, he reinstated the voivode; the increased power of Włostowic fostered deep negative relations, especially with his wife Agnes of Babenberg, who – not without reason – considered him a traitor.

On 27 July 1144, Salomea of Berg, Duke Bolesław's widow and Włostowic's bitter enemy, died. In accordance with the Duke's will, her province of Łęczyca had to revert to the Senoriate Province of Władysław, the voivode, in agreement with the Junior Dukes, he planned a coup d'état in order to take the contested district, perhaps as emolument for the younger Henry. Again, in this case, Władysław appealed for aid to his Kievan allies. Without waiting for the arrival of food, he sent his troops against the forces of Bolesław IV the Curly and Mieszko III; unexpectedly, Władysław suffered a defeat. It wasn't until the arrival of the Kievans that the fate of the battle and the war turned to Władysław's side. Immediately, a favourable peace treaty was made, which permitted the High Duke to take full control over Łęczyca; however, he had to give to the Kievan cohorts, in exchange for their aid, the Polish castle at Wizna.

In the meantime, the tensions between Władysław and Piotr Włostowic worsened. The position of the Count Palatine in the civil war was clearly against the High Duke. This attitude clearly did not correspond with Wladyslaw's concept of autocracy, and after this episode, he thought about the total removal of his brothers from their lands. By 1145, however, it seemed that a reconciliation between the High Duke and Włostowic was possible, as evidenced by the invitation to Władysław by the voivode on the occasion of Włostowic's son wedding. At the beginning of the following year, the High Duke, however, decided to bet everything on one gamble: eliminate Włostowic from his life for good. He ordered one of his knights, Dobek, to capture him. Dobek arrived at Włostowic's court at Ołbin (in present-day Wrocław), and during the night captured the voivode with his men. High Duchess Agnes demanded Włostowic's death, but Władysław decided instead to make an example out of him: he was blinded, mutilated and sentenced to exile.

Włostowic was respected and had many friends, and his fate caused many nobles to switch their allegiance to the Junior Dukes. Furthermore, the blinded Włostowic fled to the Kyivan Rus', which had so far supported Władysław, and convinced them to break their alliance.

== Deposition ==
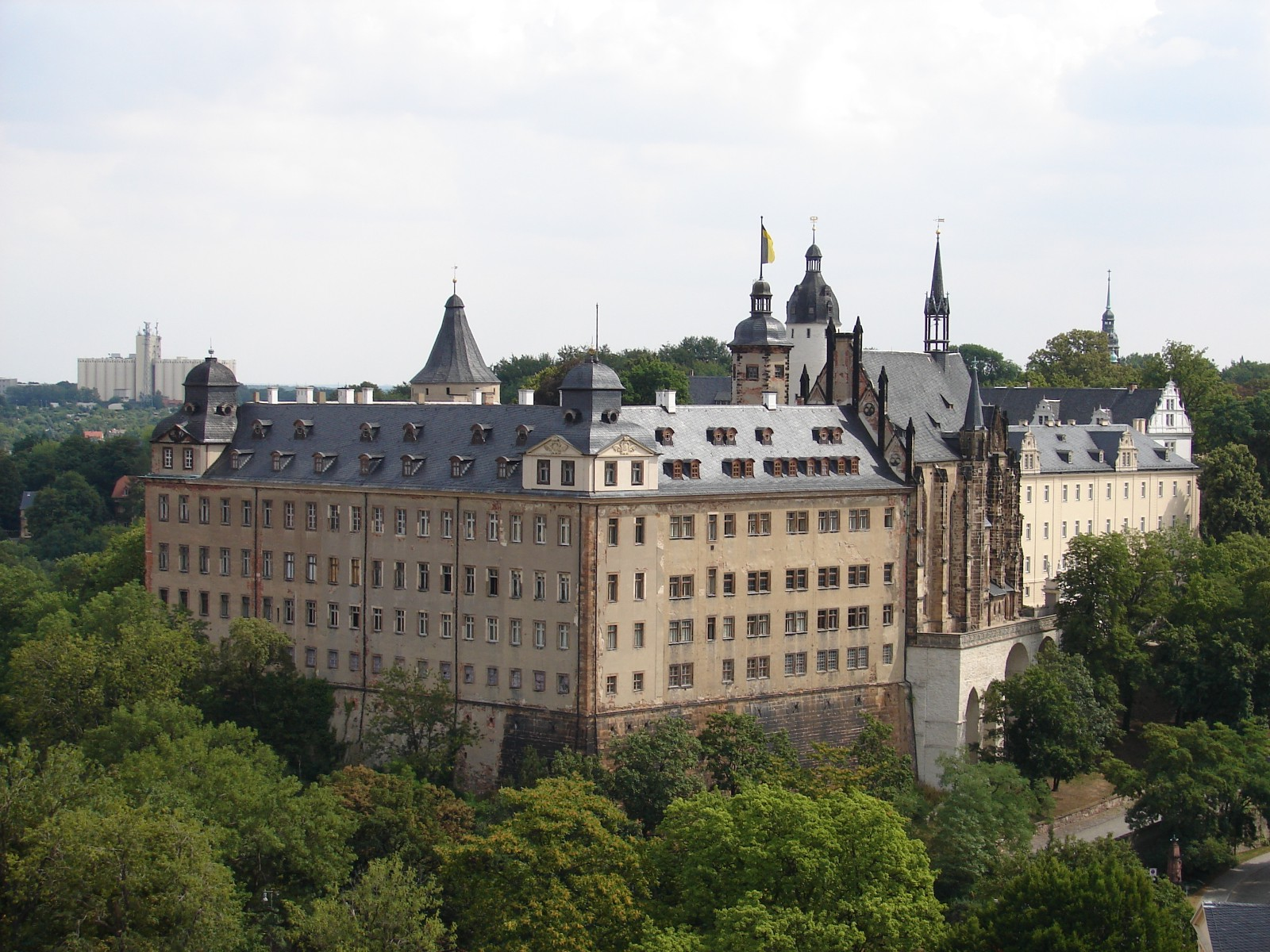
Altenburg Castle

At the beginning of 1146, Władysław decided to make the final attack on his rival half-brothers. Initially, it seemed that the victory of the High Duke was only a matter of time, since he managed to take Masovia without obstacles and forced Duke Bolesław IV the Curly to withdraw to the defense of his brother Mieszko III at Poznań in Greater Poland. There, unexpectedly, began Władysław's disaster. The reason for this was the insecurity of his other districts, where mighty rebellions erupted against Władysław's dictatorial politics. The rebels quickly grew in power thanks to the support of Archbishop Jakub ze Żnina of Gniezno, who excommunicated the High Duke – as a punishment for the fate of the voivode Włostowic – resulting in an additional series of rebellions. The defeat at the end was thanks not only to the combined forces of Duke Bołeslaw IV at Poznan with the troops of the other Junior Dukes, but also to Wladyslaw's own subjects, which was a total surprise to him. The High Duke was forced to flee abroad; shortly afterwards, his wife Agnes and children joined him, after their unsuccessful attempts to defend Kraków.

The Junior Dukes had a complete success, and Władysław was now under the mercy of his neighbours. Initially, he and his family stayed in the court of his namesake and brother-in-law, Duke Vladislaus II of Bohemia at Prague Castle. The title of a High Duke was assumed by Bołeslaw IV. Władysław never returned to Poland.

== Exile ==
Soon after his arrival in Bohemia, his brother-in-law, King Conrad III of Germany, offered him his hospitality. Władysław shortly after moved to Germany and paid tribute to King Conrad and asked for assistance in regaining the throne. As King Conrad had also been able to reinstate Vladislaus of Bohemia shortly before, it initially appeared that Władysław would regain power over Poland very soon. The expedition against the Junior Dukes was launched in 1146, but due to flooding of the Oder river and the pressure on the German king by the margraves Albert the Bear and Conrad of Meissen, who showed no interest in an armed conflict at the German eastern border, the campaign finally failed.

Władysław, of course, did not lose hope of changing his fate, but for now, he had to accept the postponement of his return, particularly when Conrad III started the Second Crusade with King Louis VII of France to the Holy Land the next year. During this time, the former High Duke administrated the Kaiserpfalz at Altenburg and its dependencies in the Imperial Pleissnerland. Without waiting for German aid, Władysław and his wife Agnes went to the Roman Curia and asked Pope Eugene III for help, but this attempt was also unsuccessful.

== Death and legacy ==
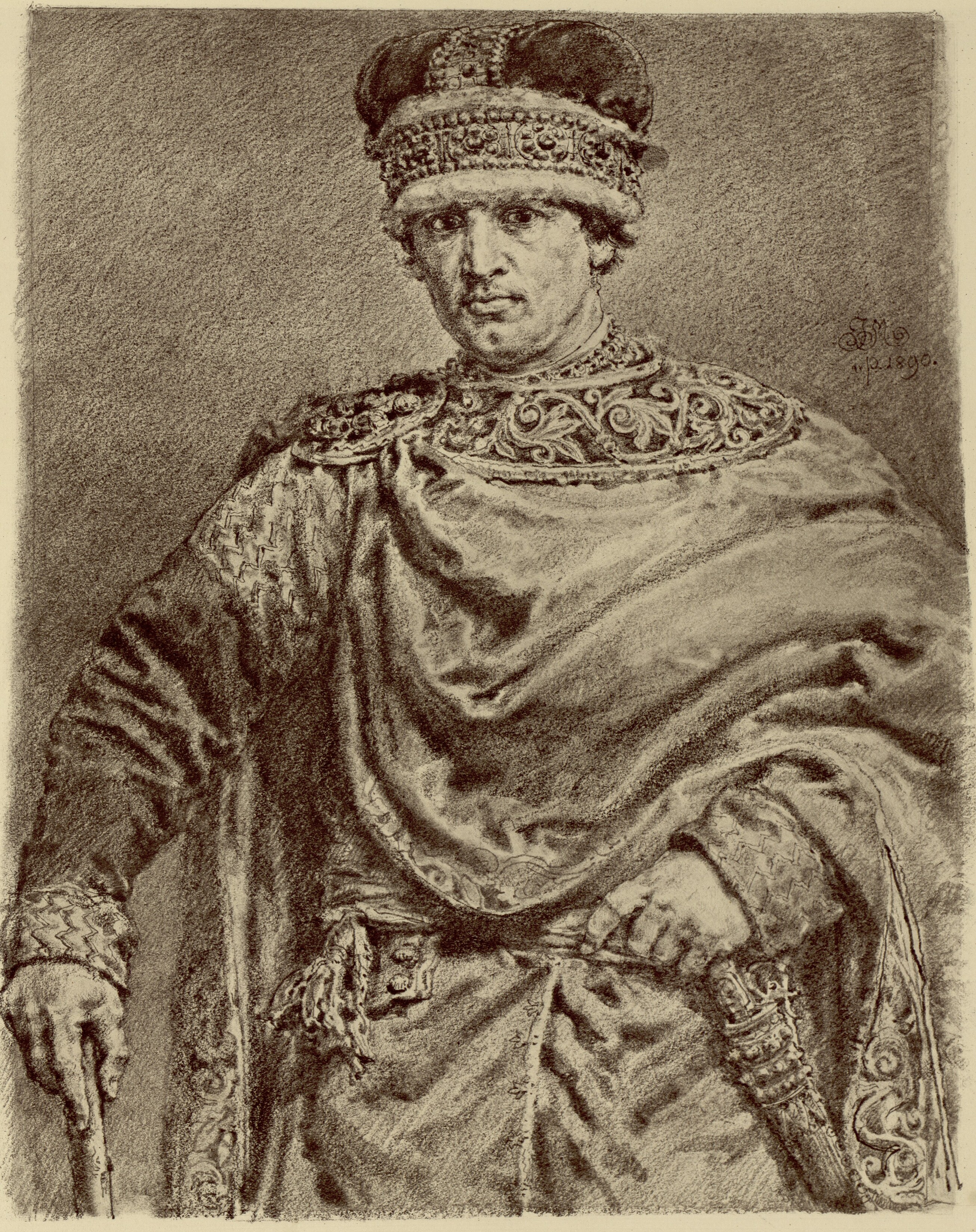
Władysław II the Exile, as imagined by artist Jan Matejko in the 19th century

In 1152, King Conrad III died and was succeeded by his nephew Frederick Barbarossa. With this, the hopes of Władysław of returning to Poland were reborn. Following the inducements of Władysław and Frederick's aunt Agnes of Babenberg, the Holy Roman Emperor launched a new expedition to Greater Poland in 1157. The campaign was a success, but unexpectedly Frederick Barbarossa did not restore Władysław to the Polish throne, after Bolesław IV apprehended at Krzyszkowo had to declare himself a vassal to the Emperor and was compelled to pay tribute to him. In compensation, the Emperor forced Bolesław IV to promise the restitution of Silesia to Władysław's sons Bolesław the Tall and Mieszko IV Tanglefoot.

At this time, it appears, Władysław knew that his battle for supremacy in Poland was finally lost. He remained in exile at Altenburg, where he died two years later. It was not until 1163 that Bolesław IV finally granted the Silesian province to Władysław's sons.

Apart from the question of an actual enfeoffment of Władysław's sons by the emperor, a disruption between them and their Piast cousins had occurred. In the following centuries, Silesia was divided into as many as 17 separate duchies among their descendants and successors, who from the early 14th century onwards gradually became vassals of the Imperial Kingdom of Bohemia. By the 1335 Treaty of Trentschin the Polish king Casimir III the Great renounced all claims to the Silesian lands, which remained under the rule of the Silesian Piasts until the male line of the dynasty finally became extinct with the death of Duke George William of Legnica in 1675.

== Marriage and children ==
In 1125 Władysław married Agnes of Babenberg (b. ca. 1108/1113 – d. at Altenburg, 24/25 January 1163), daughter of Margrave Saint Leopold III of Austria and Agnes of Germany, who in turn was a daughter of Emperor Henry IV. She was also the half-sister of King Conrad III of Germany.

They had:

1. Bolesław I the Tall (b. 1127 – d. 8 December 1201);
2. Mieszko I Tanglefoot (b. ca. 1130 – 16 May 1211);
3. Richeza (b. 1140 – d. 16 June 1185), married firstly in 1152 to Alfonso VII, King of Galicia, Castile and León, secondly in 1162 to Ramon Berenguer II, Count of Provence and thirdly by 1167 to Albert III, Count of Everstein;
4. Konrad Spindleshanks (b. 1146/1157 – d. 17 January 1190);
5. Albert (d. young, ca. 1168).

== See also ==
- Silesian Piasts
- Carmen Mauri
- History of Poland (966–1385)
- Dukes of Silesia

== Bibliography ==
- Berend, Nora; Urbańczyk, Przemysław; Wiszewski, Przemysław (2013). Central Europe in the High Middle Ages: Bohemia, Hungary and Poland, c. 900–c. 1300. Cambridge University Press.
- Davies, Norman (1982). God's Playground:A History of Poland. Vol. I. Columbia University Press.
- Freed, John B. (2016). Frederick Barbarossa: The Prince and the Myth. Yale University Press.
- Reilly, Bernard F. (1998). The Kingdom of León-Castilla under King Alfonso VII, 1126–1157. University of Pennsylvania Press.
- Wyrzykowska, Malgorzata (2016). "The Cult of Saints of the House of Habsburg in Silesian Baroque Art". In Bogade, Marco (ed.). Transregionalität in Kult und Kultur: Bayern, Böhmen und Schlesien zur Zeit der Gegenreformation. Bohlau Verlag Köln Weimar Wein.

Władysław II the Exile Piast Dynasty Born: 1105 Died: 30 May 1159
Preceded by Bolesław III Wrymouth	High Duke of Poland; Duke of Kraków; 1138 – 1146	Succeeded by Bolesław IV the Curly
New creation	Duke of Silesia; 1138 – 1146	Succeeded by Bolesław IV the Curly
