= Mieszko IV Tanglefoot =

Duke of Kraków (c. 1130 – 1211)

- Duke of Kraków; Duke of Racibórz, Opole
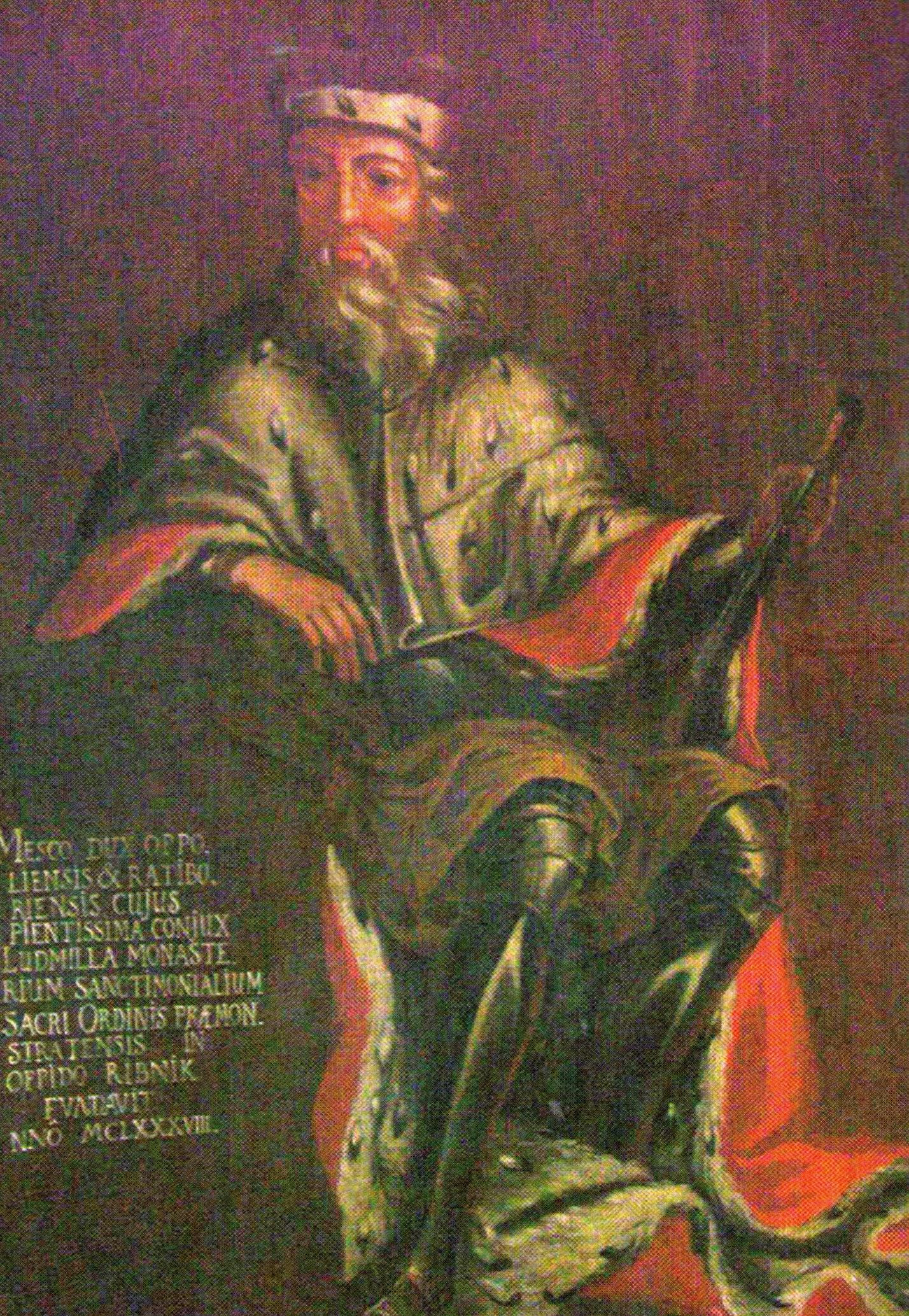

High Duke of Poland
- Reign: 1210 – 1211
- Predecessor: Leszek I the White
- Successor: Leszek I the White

Duke of Silesia
- Reign: 1163 – 1173
- Predecessor: Bolesław IV the Curly
- Successor: Bolesław I the Tall
- Born: c. 1130
- Died: 16 May 1211
- Spouse: Ludmila
- Issue: Casimir I of Opole
- House: Silesian Piasts
- Father: Władysław II the Exile
- Mother: Agnes of Babenberg

Mieszko IV Tanglefoot (Polish: Mieszko IV Plątonogi) (c. 1130 – 16 May 1211) was Duke of Kraków and High Duke of Poland from 9 June 1210 until his death one year later. He was also Duke of Silesia from 1163 to 1173 (with his brother as co-ruler), Duke of Racibórz from 1173, and Duke of Opole from 1202.

His nickname "Tanglefoot" (Plątonogi) appeared in the chronicles from the 14th and 15th centuries. From Rocznik Sędziwoja, annals written in the mid-fifteenth century, the entry for the year 1192: "Cracovia civitas devastata est a Mescone loripede dicto Platonogy nepote ducis Kazimiriensis filio Wladislai exulis" (en: "The city of Kraków was devastated by Mieszko the bandy-legged, called Platonogy, nephew of Duke Casimir, son of Władysław the Exile"). (Note: It was previously noted on this page that this was the oldest preserved record of Mieszko's nickname in the form of "Plątonogi". This was when the sentence was worded as though 1192 was the year of the reference itself, and not the year to which the quote referred.) (Note: Interestingly, despite the reference, Mieszko I Tanglefoot had little to do with Kraków in 1192. It was Mieszko II the Old, and possibly his son, Mieszko the Younger, who were challenging Casimir II the Just for rule over Kraków and the Seniorate Province.)

== Early life ==
Mieszko was the second son of Władysław II the Exile and Agnes of Babenberg. From 1146, after the deposition of his father, Mieszko and his family mainly lived in the town of Altenburg in Saxony, which was granted as a temporary possession to Władysław II by Agnes's half-brother King Conrad III of Germany. During his time in exile, Mieszko studied in Michaelsberg and Bamberg.

The exile for the deposed high duke turned out to be permanent; he died in Altenburg in 1159. His sons continued the fight to recover their inheritance, and finally, three years later, in 1163, and thanks to the intervention of the Emperor Frederick Barbarossa, Mieszko and his older brother Bolesław I the Tall returned to Silesia.

== Duke of Racibórz ==
Mieszko and Bolesław I the Tall co-ruled the Duchy of Wrocław during the period 1163–1173. At first, their rule did not extend over the major Silesian cities, which remained under the control of Bolesław IV the Curly, then the high duke of Poland. The brothers retook them in the year 1165, taking advantage of Bolesław IV's involvement in a crusade against the Prussians.

Eventually, Mieszko began efforts to obtain his own Duchy, in part because his older brother Bolesław took all the government into his hands and left little participation for Mieszko there. In 1172, Mieszko began an open rebellion against his brother. He also supported Bolesław's eldest son, Jarosław, who was forced to become a priest thanks to the intrigues of his stepmother, Christina, who wished for her sons to be the only heirs. The rebellion was a complete surprise to Bolesław, who was forced to escape to Erfurt, Germany. However, the intervention of the Emperor favoured the return of Bolesław soon afterwards, but he was forced to give separate lands to both Mieszko (who received the towns of Racibórz and Cieszyn) and Jarosław (who received Opole).

== Bytom and Oświęcim ==
In 1177, Mieszko supported his uncle and namesake Mieszko III the Old when he had to fight to maintain his rule over the Duchy of Kraków. This renewed the disputes between him and Bolesław I the Tall, who wished to obtain the Duchy and with this the Seniorate. However, Bolesław suffered an unexpected defeat by Mieszko and his own son Jarosław, who distracted him from his advance over Kraków. In his place was his younger uncle and ally, Casimir II the Just, who captured the city and was proclaimed the new High Duke of Poland. Mieszko III the Old found himself in exile in Racibórz and it seemed that a war between Mieszko Tanglefoot and Casimir II the Just was now just a matter of time. Casimir II, however, went a different route, and in order to gain the favour of the Duke of Racibórz, gave him the towns of Oświęcim and Bytom (with the fortress of Oświęcim, Bytom, Mikołów, Siewierz and Pszczyna, although some historians estimate that these fortresses had belonged to Mieszko only since 1179. On the other hand, Bolesław the Tall suffered a further diminution of his authority when he was compelled to give Głogów to his youngest brother Konrad, who had recently returned from Germany and claimed his part over the Silesian inheritance.

In 1195, Mieszko and his nephew Jarosław supported Mieszko III the Old in his new attempt to recover Kraków and the Seniorate. The death of Casimir II the Just and the minority of his sons gave them the opportunity to attack and regain control over Lesser Poland. However, Kraków and the nobility of Sandomierz, led by the voivode Nicholas, had other plans and decided to support Casimir II's eldest son, Leszek the White. Both sides clashed in the bloody Battle of Mozgawa (Mozgawą) near Jędrzejów (13 September 1195), where Mieszko III was seriously injured and his son Bolesław of Kuyavia died. The Silesian troops, led by Mieszko and Jarosław, arrived on the battlefield too late; soon after, Mieszko III withdrew to Kalisz. Over the forces of the Count palatine Goworek, who also arrived to help Leszek's troops, the Silesians obtained a great victory; however, because Mieszko III was not present, this victory only brought them benefits in terms of prestige and the ransoms obtained from captured Sandomierz nobles.

== Duke of Opole ==
On 22 March 1201, Jarosław of Opole died. The Duchy of Opole was then inherited by his father Bolesław the Tall, with whom the late duke had recently reconciled. However, Bolesław died only nine months later, on 7/8 December 1201, leaving all his lands to his only surviving son, Henry the Bearded.

Mieszko was determined to obtain Opole and made a surprise attack at the beginning of 1202. The Duke managed to obtain Opole, which was from then on definitively joined to his lands. Despite this victory, Mieszko wanted additional territories, but this was against the wishes of the Church, which strongly supported Henry I the Bearded. Thanks to the intervention of Henryk Kietlicz, Archbishop of Gniezno, and Cyprian, Bishop of Wroclaw, Henry I maintained his frontiers, but he had to pay 1000 pieces of silver to his supporters.

== High Duke of Poland ==
On 9 June 1210, a papal bull was decreed by Pope Innocent III, under which all of the seniorate rulers (including High Duke Leszek the White) were deposed and excommunicated. The bull demanded that the Piast princes adhere to the testament of Bolesław III Wrymouth, which proposed that the most senior of the Piast dukes is the ruler in the seniorate. Strangely, in the bull, an unnamed duke of Silesia (who was assumed to be Henry the Bearded, because he actually used that title) was exempted from the ban. The country was full of consternation, because nobody knew who had real power.

Archbishop Henryk Ketlicz decided to call the Synod of Borzykowa, where he tried to find a solution to this delicate issue. At the convention, in addition to the hierarchy of the Church, Henry I the Bearded and the other junior dukes attended. Leszek the White, wanting to ensure the support of the Church, along with other Piast princes, then gave a great privilege, which ensured the integrity of territorial possession of the bishops (the privilege was not signed by Henry I and Władysław III Spindleshanks, but they did comply with the provisions established there). Mieszko, however, was not present in Borzykowa; (Note: Mieszko Tanglefoot was in fact the eldest Piast duke at this time. This may be why he skipped the synod, as he knew that he was the beneficiary of the papal bull as written. He also may have been the exempted duke of Silesia, even though he was actually the duke of Racibórz-Opole.) With the support of the Gryfici family, he decided to lead his army and march into Kraków, where the confusion among the citizens left him in total control over the capital without fighting. This was the zenith of Mieszko's career, as he died less than one year later, on 16 May 1211. According to Jan Długosz, he was probably buried in the Cathedral of Kraków (Wawel Cathedral). Only after Mieszko's death could Leszek the White return to Kraków without major difficulties.

== Marriage and issue ==
By 1178, Mieszko married Ludmila (died after 20 October 1210), whose origins are unknown. Her name indicates that she may have a Bohemian origin, probably a member of the Přemyslid dynasty. According to the majority of historians, she could be the daughter of Otto III Detleb, Duke of Olomouc, by his wife Durantia. There are also minority hypotheses that put her as a daughter of Duke Soběslav I of Bohemia; Konrad II, Duke of Znojmo; or Vladimir, Duke of Olomouc, son of Otto III Detleb (who would be her brother according to the majority opinion).

Mieszko and Ludmila had five children:

1. Casimir I (b. ca. 1179/1180 – d. 13 May 1230);
2. Ludmilla (d. 24 January aft. 1200);
3. Agnes (d. 9 May aft. 1200);
4. Euphrosyne (d. 25 May aft. 1200);
5. Ryksa (d. aft. 24 September 1239). (Note: Her parentage is uncertain; she is only known from a document of Mieszko II the Fat, who called her his aunt (Amita), which means that she could also be the sister of his mother Viola. See Mieszko I (IV) Plątonogi (Laskonogi, Raciborski))

Mieszko's ascendency to the throne is mentioned in the first chapter of Zofia Kossak's 1944 novel "Blessed Are the Meek."

== See also ==
- History of Poland (966–1385)
- Dukes of Silesia
- History of Silesia

Mieszko IV Tanglefoot Silesian Piasts Born: c. 1130 Died: 16 May 1211
| Preceded by Bolesław IV the Curly | Duke of Silesia; 1163 – 1173 with Bolesław I the Tall | Succeeded by Bolesław I the Tall |
| Preceded by Henry I the Bearded | Duke of Opole; 1202 – 1211 | Succeeded by Casimir I of Opole |
| Preceded by Leszek I the White | High Duke of Poland; 1210 – 1211 | Succeeded by Leszek I the White |
