= Kazimierz Jasiński =

Polish cyclist

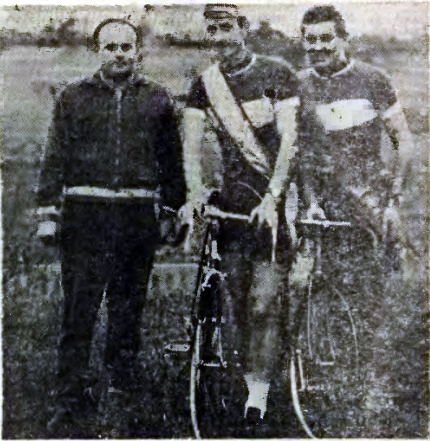
- Kazimierz Jasiński (right)

Personal information
- Born: 19 August 1946 Huta, Lipsko County, Mazowieckie, Poland
- Died: 25 January 2012 (aged 65) Bełchatów, Poland
- Height: 1.78 m (5 ft 10 in)
- Weight: 80 kg (180 lb)

Cycling career
- Sport: Cycling

Kazimierz Jasiński (19 August 1946 – 25 January 2012) was a Polish cyclist. He competed in the Men's Road Race event at the 1968 Summer Olympics.

In 1968 he was also part of the Polish team that won the Peace Race coming 11th individually. He had won two Polish titles in the road team time trial. He won a stage in the 1969 amateur Milk Race and the 1967 Baltic Sea Friendship Race. After his active career, he worked as a club coach, briefly in the US.
