= Jarosław, Duke of Opole =

Jarosław
- Duke of Opole
- Born: aft. 1143
- Died: 22 March 1201
- Father: Bolesław I the Tall
- Mother: Zvenislava of Kiev

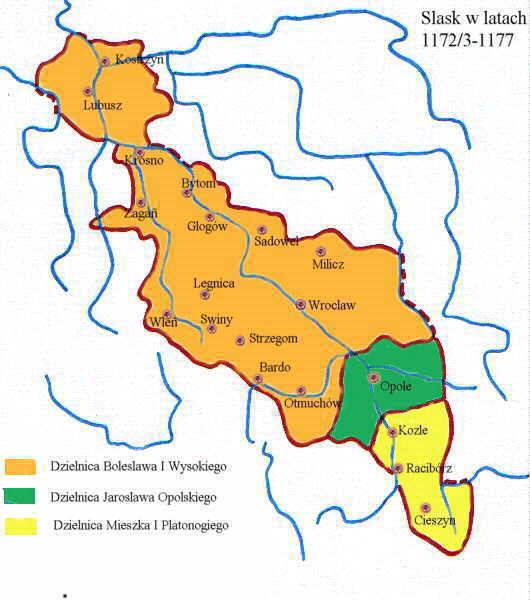
1172–1177. Fragmentation of the Duchy of Silesia begins, divided between: first son of Władysław, Bolesław I the Tall (orange); second son of Władyslaw, Mieszko I Plątonogi (yellow); son of Bolesław, Jarosław Opolski (green)

Jarosław of Opole (Polish: Jarosław opolski; aft. 1143 – 22 March 1201) was a Duke of Opole from 1173 and Bishop of Wrocław from 1198 until his death.

He was the oldest son of Bolesław I the Tall, by his first wife Zvenislava, daughter of Vsevolod II Olgovich, Grand Prince of Kiev. His Russian name was given by his mother.

== Life ==
It is unknown whether he was born already in Silesia or in exile, but he was brought up in Altenburg in the Holy Roman Empire and spent his childhood in the court of Emperor Frederick Barbarossa. After the recovery of Silesia by his father and uncle Mieszko I Tanglefoot in 1163, he moved there with the rest of his family and was there when probably began his activity in politics. However, the second marriage of his father to the German lady Christina changed diametrally his situation. Jarosław's stepmother began to intrigue her, and Bolesław the Tall increasingly began to favour his younger sons. Jarosław was forced into a religious career (in the 1160s or the 1170s) and his father decided to leave his inheritance to his sons from his second marriage.

However, Jarosław wasn't content with being removed from power (because, as the firstborn son he should have inherited Bolesław the Tall's part of the Duchy of Silesia) and began to intrigue his uncle Mieszko Tanglefoot. His opportunity to reassume his rights comes over soon. As a result of the civil war during 1172–1173, Bolesław the Tall was exiled to Erfurt. Fortunately for him, Frederick Barbarossa decided to intervene, and through his mediation Bolesław could regain the power in Lower Silesia, but was forced to create the Duchies of Racibórz (to Mieszko) and Opole (to Jarosław).

The next information found in Jarosław was in the 1190s. In 1195 Jarosław supported his uncle Mieszko III the Old in the Battle of Mozgawą, there the Silesian troops (then unnecessary because Mieszko III fled the battle before they arrived) were defeated by the Sandomierz Komes Goworek of Rawa. Three years later (1198) Jarosław accepted entirely his religious condition and has been elected Bishop of Wrocław. Since then, the Duke-Bishop reconciled with his father. A further sign of the reconciliation between father and son was that in that period the Silesian coins showed their names together. Jarosław died on 22 March 1201, a few months before his father, who took control of the Duchy of Opole. Ultimately, however, Opole was taken by Mieszko Tanglefoot at the beginning of the next year (1202), after a surprise attack on Henry I the Bearded, Bolesław the Tall's youngest son and successor. Jarosław was probably buried in Wroclaw.

Preceded by new creation Bolesław I the Tall as Duke of Wroclaw	Duke of Opole; 1173–1201	Succeeded by Bolesław I the Tall
Preceded by Żyrosław II	Bishop of Wroclaw; 1198–1201	Succeeded by Cyprian
