= History of Silesia =

Lower Silesia's historical coat of arms.

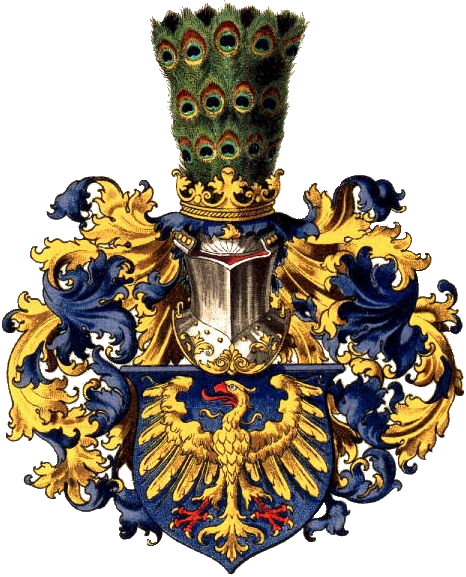
Upper Silesia's historical coat of arms.

The history of Silesia, a historical region in Central Europe centred on the upper and middle Oder, dates back to the Palaeolithic. The region was home to several prehistoric cultures, including the Lusatian culture, and was later inhabited by Celtic and Germanic peoples. By the Early Middle Ages, it was inhabited by West Slavic tribes.

After a period of Bohemian rule, Silesia became part of the emerging Polish state under the Piast dynasty in the late 10th century. Following the fragmentation of Poland from 1138 onwards, the region was gradually divided into numerous duchies ruled by the Silesian Piasts. During the 12th and 13th centuries, German settlers contributed to agricultural development, urbanisation and the spread of German town law.

During the 14th century, most Silesian duchies came under the suzerainty of the kings of Bohemia, and in 1348 Silesia was incorporated into the Crown of Bohemia within the Holy Roman Empire. In 1526, it passed with the Bohemian Crown to the Habsburg monarchy. The Reformation spread widely throughout the region, which later suffered extensive devastation during the Thirty Years' War. In 1742, following its conquest by Frederick the Great, most of Silesia was ceded to Prussia, while a smaller part remained under Habsburg rule as Austrian Silesia. Prussian Silesia became part of the German Empire in 1871. During the 19th century, industrialisation transformed Upper Silesia into a major centre of mining and manufacturing.

Following the First World War, Silesia was divided between Germany, Poland and Czechoslovakia. Most of Austrian Silesia became part of Czechoslovakia, while Cieszyn Silesia was divided between Poland and Czechoslovakia in 1920. Following the Silesian Uprisings and the Upper Silesia plebiscite of 1921, the eastern part of Prussian Upper Silesia was ceded to Poland in 1922. In 1939, Nazi Germany annexed the Polish part of Silesia following the invasion of Poland. The region experienced persecution, forced labour and the murder of its Jewish population during the Holocaust.

In 1945, Soviet forces occupied most of Silesia, and the former German territories east of the Oder–Neisse line were placed under Polish administration in accordance with the Potsdam Agreement. Most of the German population fled or was expelled, and Polish settlers arrived. A substantial proportion of the local population remained in Upper Silesia. The German–Polish border was confirmed by the two countries in 1990. Today, most of Silesia lies within Poland, with smaller parts in the Czech Republic and Germany.

== Prehistory ==
Neolithic Europe (c. 4500–4000 BC): Silesia is part of the Danubian culture (yellow).

The first signs of humans in Silesia date to between 230,000 and 100,000 years ago. The Silesian region between the upper Vistula and upper Oder was the northern extreme of the human penetration at the time of the last glaciation. The anatomically modern human is estimated to have arrived in Silesia about 35,000 years ago. Subsequently, Silesia was inhabited by people who belonged to changing archaeological cultures in the Stone, Bronze and Iron Ages. The civilization of Old Europe included Silesia. In the late Bronze Age, the Lusatian culture (in the past, variously speculated to be either 'pre-Germanic', Proto-Slavic, Thracian, Karpo-Dacian or Illyrian) covered Silesia. Later, the Scythians and Celts (the tribes of Boii, Gotini and Osi) played a role within the Silesian territory. Still later Germanic tribes migrated to Silesia, possibly from Northern Germany or Scandinavia.

=== Celts in Silesia (4th-1st centuries BC) ===
The Celts migrated to parts of Silesia in at least two waves. The first wave of Celtic settlers came to areas north of the Sudetes at the beginning of the 4th century BC. They represented the La Tène culture. Archaeologists found evidence of Celtic presence dating to that period in areas of loess soils to the south of modern Wrocław, between the Bystrzyca river and the Oława river, as well as on the Głubczyce Plateau, where for example a lot of Celtic coins have been found. Perhaps the largest Celtic settlement in Silesia, was the one excavated at Nowa Cerekwia site in Upper Silesia - it was comparable in size to Boii settlements at Němčice in Moravia and at Roseldorf in Lower Austria. Another Celtic migration to areas of modern Poland occurred probably in parallel with the invasions of Greece and Macedonia in 279-277 BC. At that time Celtic colonization extended also into modern Lesser Poland and Subcarpathia.

Celtic culture in Silesia flourished during the 4th, 3rd and most of the 2nd centuries BC, but archaeological evidence points to a dramatic population crash - and even to complete depopulation of some areas of Celtic settlement - by the end of the 2nd century BC. Those changes coincided in time with the migrations of the Cimbri and the Teutones, who crossed Silesia on their way south. At that time all evidence of habitation on the Głubczyce Plateau disappeared, and the region remained uninhabited for the next 150 years. In other parts of the Celtic territory in Silesia the population also experienced very sharp declines, but not as total as in the Głubczyce region. Minting of Celtic coins continued in some settlements until the end of the 1st century BC. However, from the 1st century CE onward all evidence of Celtic material culture disappears from Silesia.

The La Tène culture in Silesia was succeeded (replaced) by the Przeworsk culture.

== Ancient history ==
The first written sources about Silesia came from the Egyptian Ptolemy (Magna Germania) and the Roman Tacitus (Germania). According to Tacitus, the 1st century AD Silesia was inhabited by a multi-ethnic league dominated by the Lugii. The Silingi were also part of this federation, and most likely a Vandalic people (Germanic) that lived south of the Baltic Sea in the Laba, later Elbe, Oder and Vistula river areas. Other East Germanic tribes also inhabited the region.

After c. AD 500, the Migration Period had induced the bulk of the East Germanic tribes to continue their migration and leave Silesia for Southern Europe, while Slavic tribes began to appear and spread into Silesian lands.

== Early Medieval Slavic tribes ==
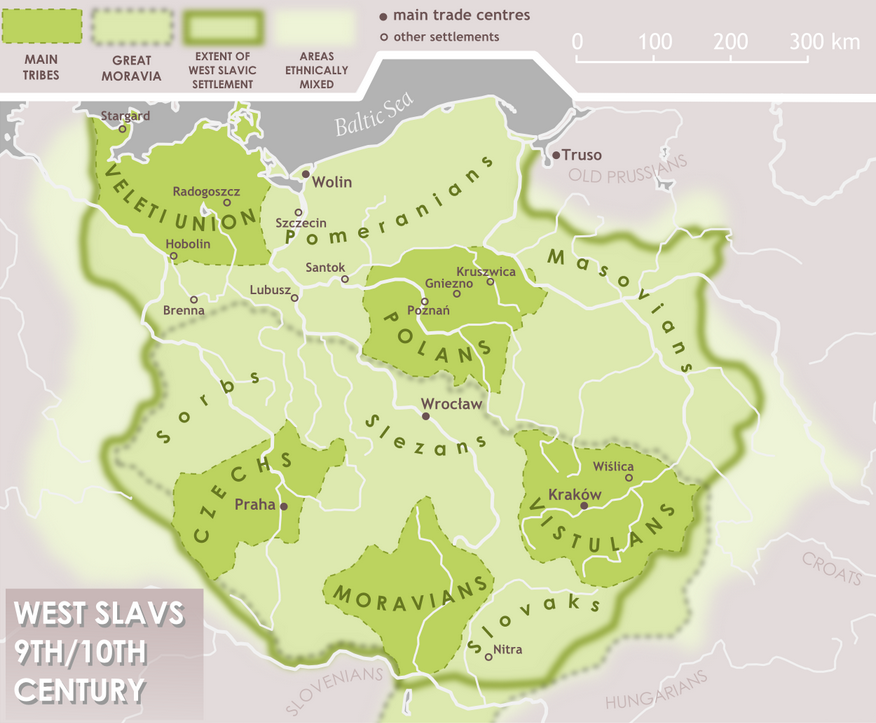
Distribution of Slavic tribes between the 9th–10th centuries

Sources describing Silesia of the 9th and 10th centuries, such as the Bavarian Geographer (c. AD 845) or Thietmar's Chronicle, indicate that the area which later became known as Silesia, was back then inhabited by several Lechitic tribes, known from written sources under their Latinised names. The Sleenzane (Slenzans; Ślężanie) lived in lands near modern Wrocław and along the Ślęza river, as well as near mount Ślęża. They probably numbered 60–75,000 people and according to the Bavarian Geographer, they were divided into 15 civitates. The Opolini (Opolans; Opolanie) lived in lands near modern Opole, their population was perhaps 30–40,000 and comprised 20 civitates. The Dadodesani or Dedosize (Dyadosans; Dziadoszanie) lived in areas near modern Głogów, numbered probably 30,000 people, as well as 20 civitates. The Golensizi (Golensizians; Golęszyce) dwelled near modern Racibórz, Cieszyn and Opawa - they consisted of five civitates. The Lupiglaa (Głubczyce) probably lived on the Głubczyce Plateau, near Głubczyce, and comprised 30 civitates. The Trebouane (Tryebovians; Trzebowianie), mentioned by the Prague Document (which describes the situation as of year 973 or earlier), occupied areas near modern Legnica and could number some 25–30,000 individuals. The Poborane (Bobrans; Bobrzanie) - mentioned by the same document - lived along the lower and middle course of the Bóbr river. The Psyovians (Psouane; Pszowianie) lived near Pszów, to the east of the Opolans and to the west of Kraków.

At the turn of the 10th and 11th centuries (c. AD 1000), the total population of Silesia is estimated as around 250,000 people.

== Great Moravia and Duchy of Bohemia ==
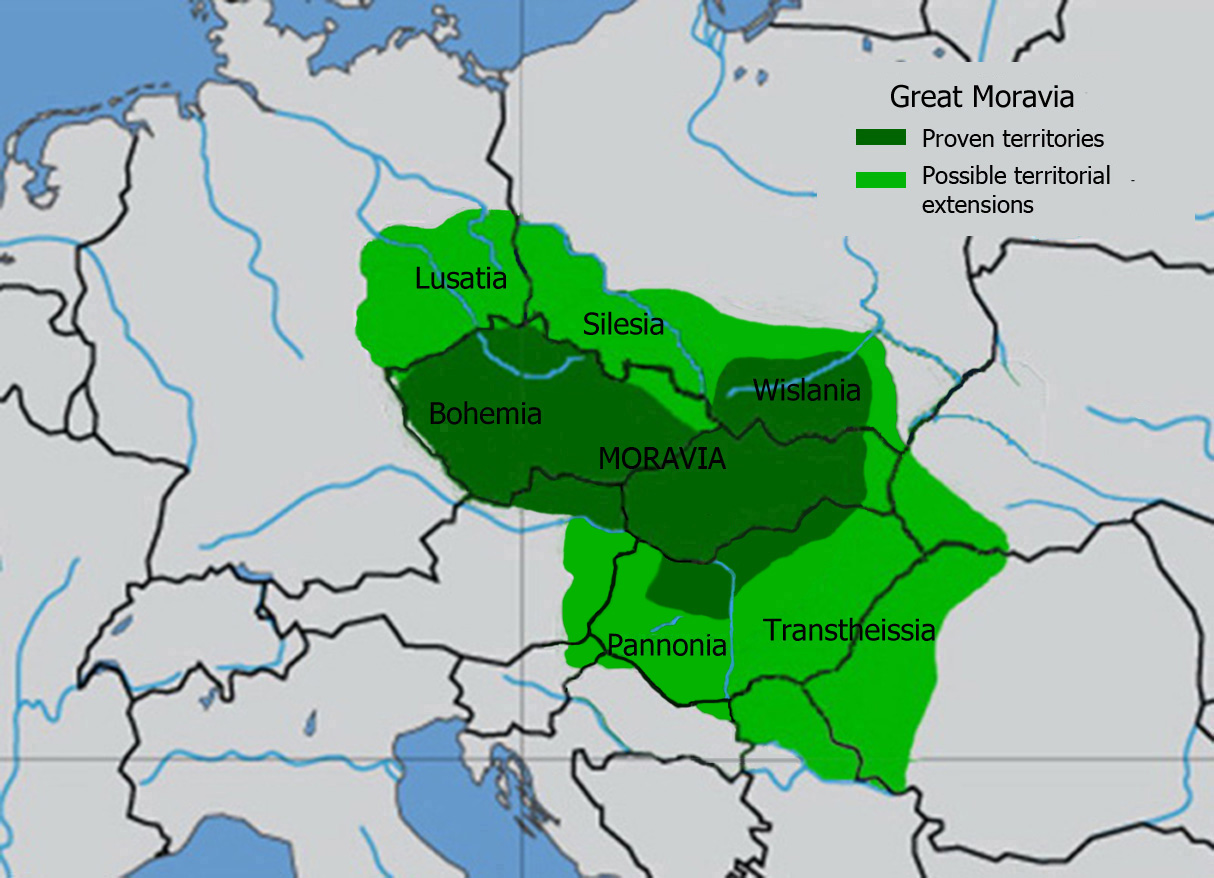
Central Europe during the mid-9th century, showing Great Moravia (including Silesia) during the rule of Svatopluk I.

In the 9th century, parts of Silesia's territory came under the influence of Great Moravia, the first historically attested state in the region. After Great Moravia's decline one of its successors, Bohemia, gradually conquered Silesia. At the beginning of the 10th century Vratislaus I subdued the Golensize and soon afterwards seized Middle Silesia. Wrocław was possibly founded by and named after him. His son Boleslaus I subdued the Boborane between 950 and 965 and later also the Opolane and Dedosize. The town of Bolesławiec bears his name. The Bohemian rulers also tried to evangelize the region and opened up Silesia for international trade. In 973, when he travelled from Prague to Kraków, explorer/historian Abraham ben Jacob crossed Southern Silesia on a road which later became one of the major East/West trading routes.

== Kingdom of Poland ==
Early Piast Poland with Silesia in the end of the reign of Mieszko I, c. 992.

During the late 10th century, the lands of present-day Silesia were gradually incorporated into the emerging Polish state under Mieszko I. Archaeological evidence, including the dendrochronological dating of strongholds along the Oder to around 985, suggests that Piast rule had already extended to parts of the region before 990.

A conflict between Mieszko I and Boleslaus II of Bohemia, traditionally dated to 990, is described by Thietmar of Merseburg. Mieszko received military assistance from Empress Theophanu, while Boleslaus was supported by the Liutizi. The conflict has traditionally been associated with the incorporation of Silesia into the Piast realm, although Thietmar did not identify the disputed territory, and its location remains debated. A later account by the Monk of Sázava records the loss of Niemcza in 990, but whether this refers to the Silesian Niemcza and whether it was connected with the conflict described by Thietmar are uncertain.

Mieszko's successor, Bolesław I established an independent Polish ecclesiastical province in 1000 (see: Congress of Gniezno) the bishopric of Wrocław, subordinate to the archbishopric of Gniezno. After the death of Bolesław I in 1025 his oldest son Mieszko II was crowned king of Poland. Due to a foreign invasion in 1031 Mieszko went into exile. The military defeat of the young state led to a pagan revolt in 1031–1032. It endangered the newly established Christian church also in Silesia where it ousted the bishop of Wrocław. However, Mieszko regained power in 1032 and restored order. He died in 1034, succeeded by his oldest son Casimir the Restorer. In 1037 a nobles' revolt took place and Casimir fled. This was exploited by a Bohemian Duke, Bretislaus I, who, after pillaging Greater Poland, took control of Silesia in 1038. In 1039 Casimir was back in Poland and started to reunite the country. In 1050, he retook most of Silesia, but was forced to pay tribute to Bohemia. This tribute, 300 Marks per year (later raised to 500 Marks), was the reason for repeated wars between the two countries. Silesia was moreover divided by internal struggles, as some parts of the society were unsatisfied with the changes imposed by Poland. In 1093, the Silesian nobility, supported by Bohemia, revolted. The nobles demanded removal from power of despotic palatine Sieciech as well as recognition of prince Zbigniew of Poland's rights to the Polish crown. The uprising was only partly successful. Zbigniew was officially recognized as heir to the throne. Sieciech however retained power until 1099 and fled the country in 1101. This era of wars and unrest ended with the peace treaty of Kladsko (Polish: Kłodzko) in 1137, in which the border between Bohemia and Silesia was defined and the affiliation of the Kladsko area to Bohemia was confirmed.

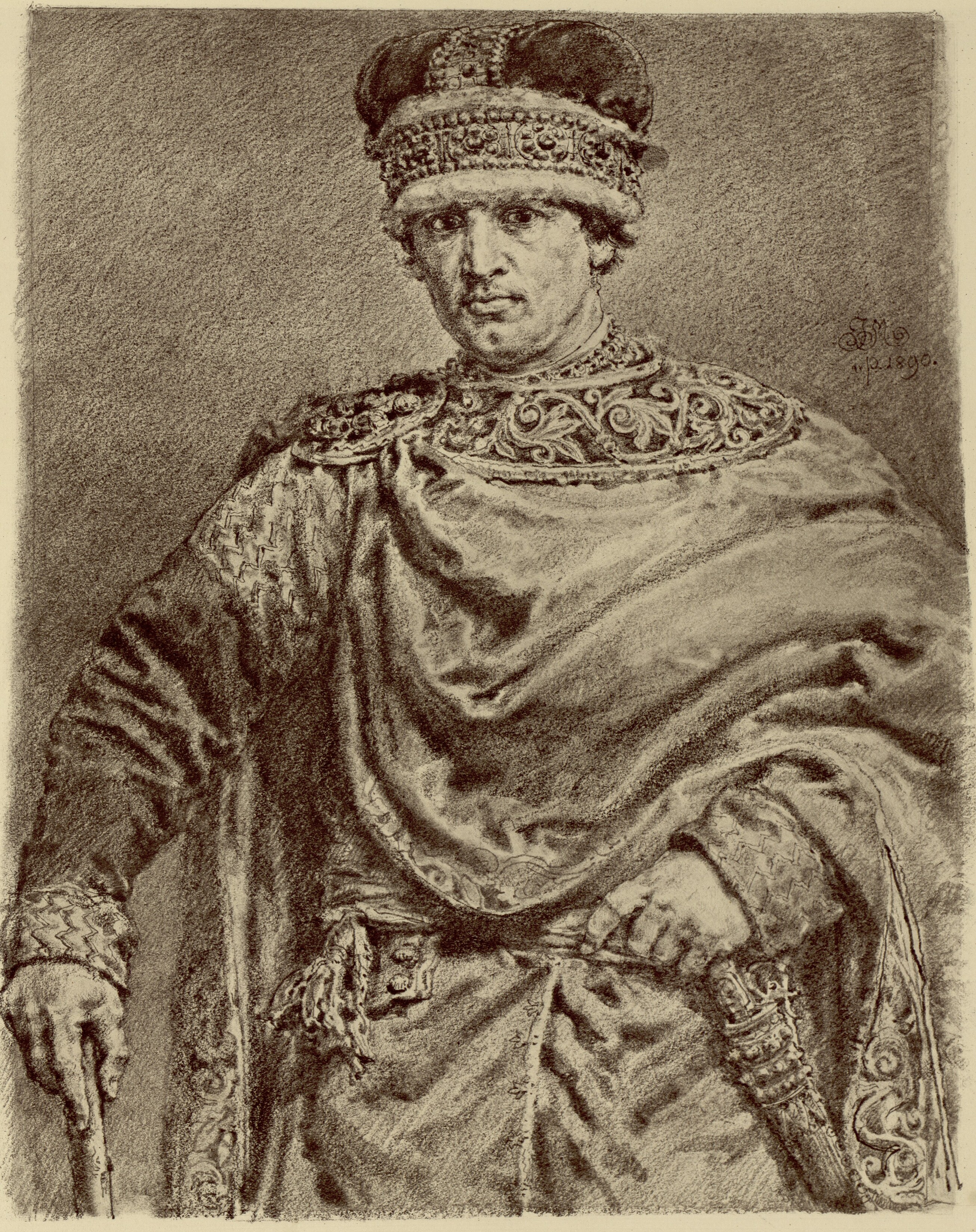
Władysław II the Exile. First of the Silesian Piasts. Drawing by Jan Matejko.

In 1146, High Duke Władysław II was driven into exile to Germany by his brothers, who opposed his attempts to strengthen control of High Duke over the remaining dukes. Silesia then became a possession of the new High Duke, Bolesław IV the Curly. Meanwhile, Władysław unsuccessfully tried to persuade Holy Roman Emperors Conrad III and his successor Frederick Barbarossa to aid him in retaking his duchy. In 1163, his three sons (Konrad, Mieszko and Bolesław) took possession of Silesia with Imperial backing and probably ruled it together until 1172, before dividing the territory. Bolesław received the area of Wrocław, Opole and Legnica, Konrad Żagań, Głogów and Krosno and Mieszko the smallest part with Ratibor and Cieszyn. As Konrad prepared himself in Fulda for a clerical career, his brother Bolesław administered his possessions until Konrad's early death, when Bolesław incorporated Konrad's domain into his duchy. Mieszko at the same time expanded his own duchy with parts of the Duchy of Kraków around Bytom and Oświęcim, which were given to him by Casimir II in 1178, and Opole, which he received after Bolesław's death. In 1202 Bolesław's son, Henry I, and Mieszko moreover specified to rule out the right of succession among their branches, an arrangement which was largely responsible for the special position of what would become Upper Silesia. In the same year Poland abolished the seniorate and Silesia's duchies became independent under constitutional law.

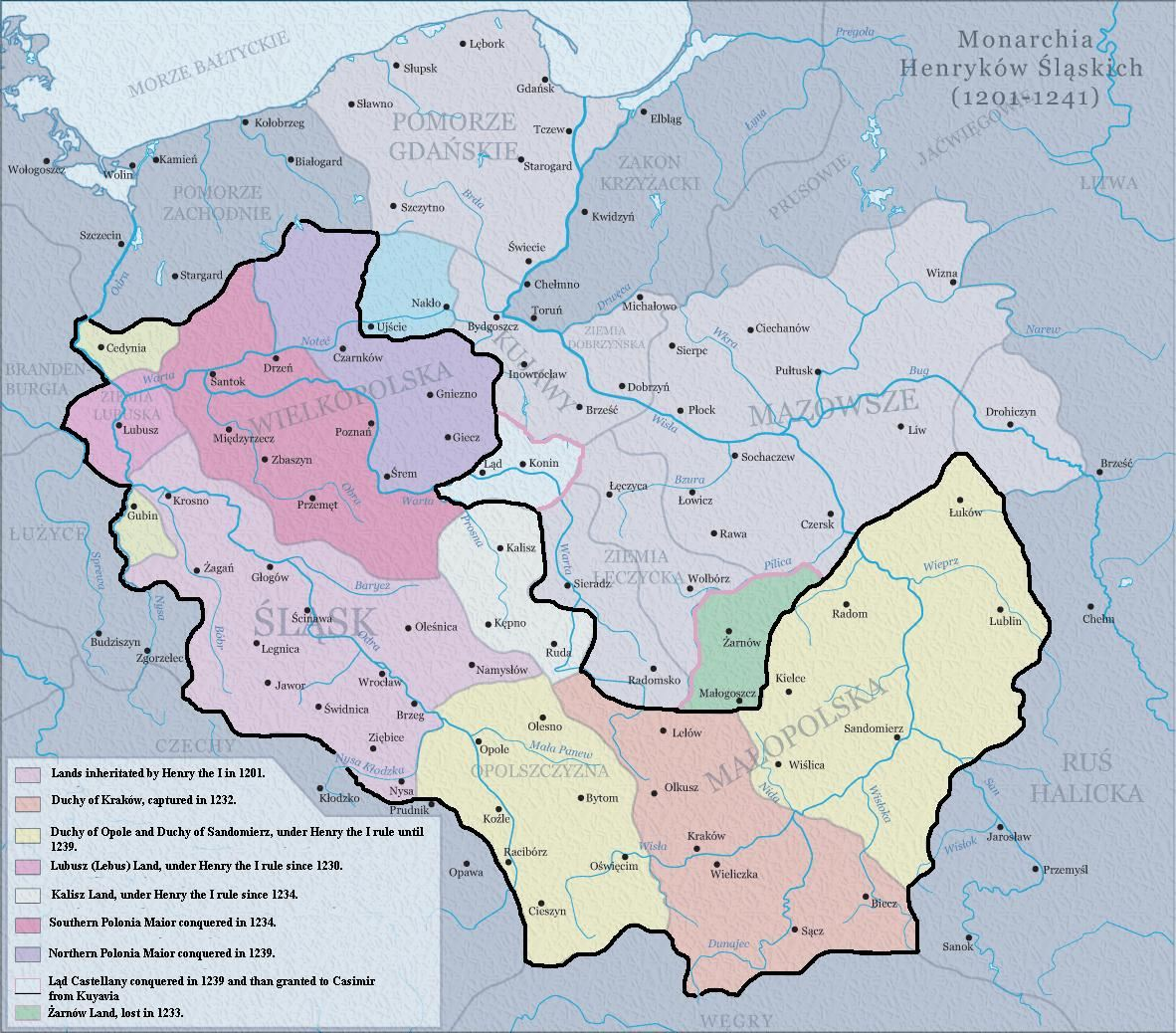
Monarchy of the Silesian Henries from the House of Piast.

In the first half of the 13th century Silesian duke Henry I the Bearded, reunited much of the divided Kingdom of Poland (Regnum Poloniae). His expeditions led him as far north as the Duchy of Pomerania, where for a short time he held some of its southern areas. He became the duke of Kraków (Polonia Minor) in 1232, which gave him the title of senior duke of Poland (see Testament of Bolesław III Krzywousty), and came into possession of most of Greater Poland in 1234. Henry failed in his attempt to achieve the Polish crown. His activity in this field was continued by his son and successor Henry II the Pious, until his sudden death in 1241 (Battle of Legnica). His successors were not able to maintain their holdings outside of Silesia, which were lost to other Piast dukes. Polish historians refer to territories acquired by Silesian dukes in this period as Monarchia Henryków śląskich ("The monarchy of the Silesian Henries"). In those days Wrocław was the political center of the divided Kingdom of Poland.

Some German textbooks present the view that Silesia separated from the Polish political community as early as 1163 by acknowledging its feudal dependency on the Holy Roman Empire. According to these accounts, a rapid Germanization of Silesia and the local branch of the Piast dynasty ensued. Polish textbooks, on the other hand, emphasize Silesia's political and ecclesiastical ties to the Piast patrimonial state during the Middle Ages. The separation of Silesia from the Polish political community is dated to the years 1325/1348, specifically in connection with the transfer of the Silesian principalities to the domain of the Bohemian kings.

=== Mongol invasion ===
In 1241, after raiding Lesser Poland, the Mongols invaded Silesia and caused widespread panic and mass flight. They looted much of the region, but abandoned their siege of the castle of Wrocław, supposedly after being fended off by Blessed Czeslaw's "miraculous fireball." They then defeated the combined Polish and German forces under Henry II at the Battle of Legnica, which took place at Legnickie Pole near Legnica. Upon the death of Ögedei Khan, the Mongols chose not to press forward further into Europe, but returned east to participate in the election of a new Grand Khan.

=== German settlement ===
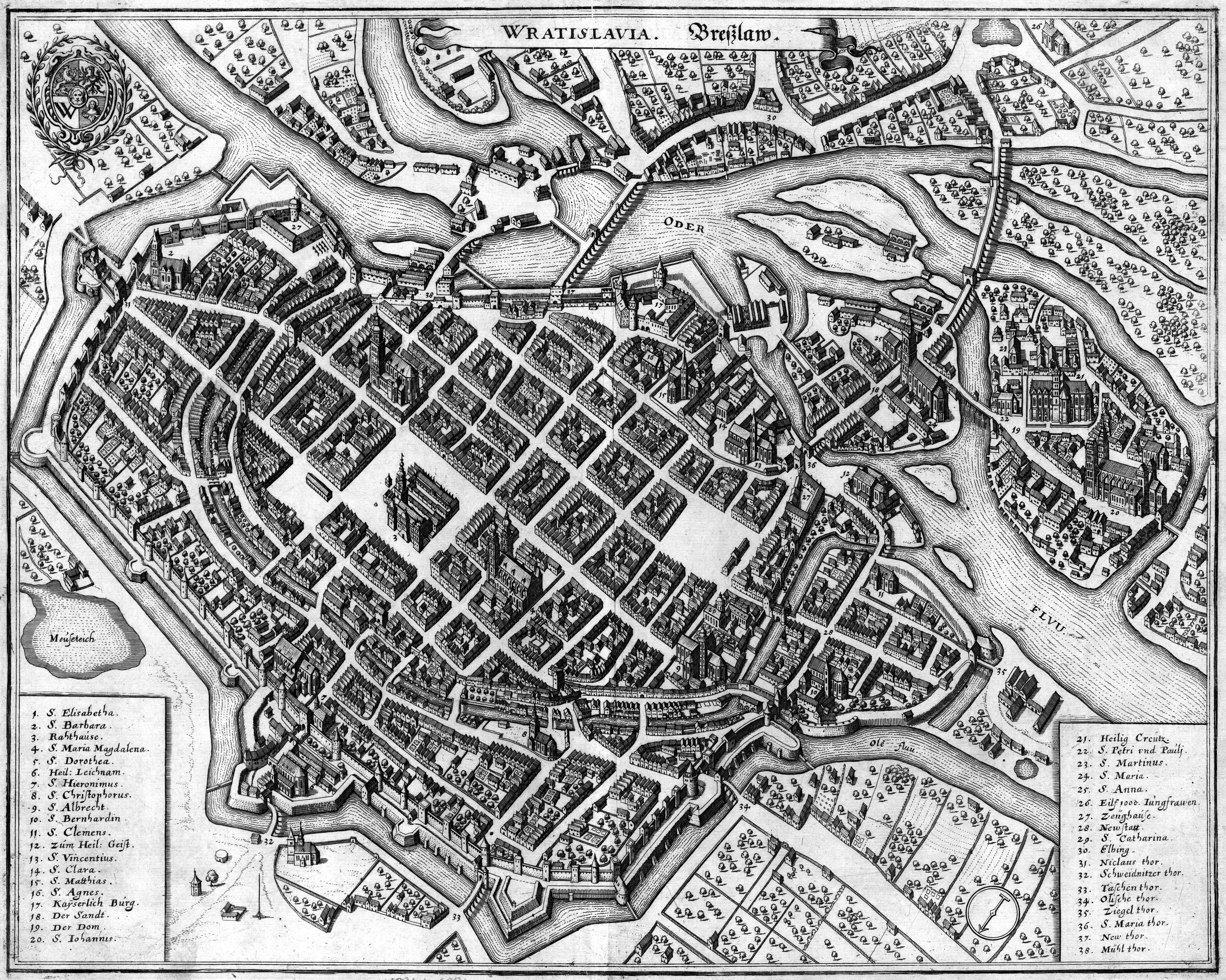
Map of Wrocław/Breslau.

Walloons belonged to the first settlers from western Europe in Silesia, working in various fields and places in the middle and late 12th century. Noticeable were weavers in Wrocław and Oława, peasants near Wrocław, Oława and Namysłów and Augustinian monks from Arrouaise (Artois) in Sobótka. The German Ostsiedlung was started at the same time by the ruling Piasts in order to develop their realms and to increase their power. Silesia then was sparsely populated with approximately 150,000 people. Settlements consisted of small hamlets, each inhabited by only a few peasants. Castellanies with small suburbias around them were centers of administration, commerce and crafts. In 1155 probably 20 castellanies existed across Silesia. Some marketplaces existed without an accompanying castle, like Środa Śląska or Sobótka. These settlements were already noticeable towns in an economic sense, while most of the larger ones were a ruler's residence. Contemporary sources record 8 markets in Silesia, but the real number was probably much higher. The castellanies with their fortified churches were the center of the church organization, while the network of churches was very coarsely meshed and multiple villages belonged to single parishes. The dominions were protected by the so-called Preseka (German: Hag, Latin: indago ), a wide, fortified strip of woodland which had to be maintained by the Polish peasants.

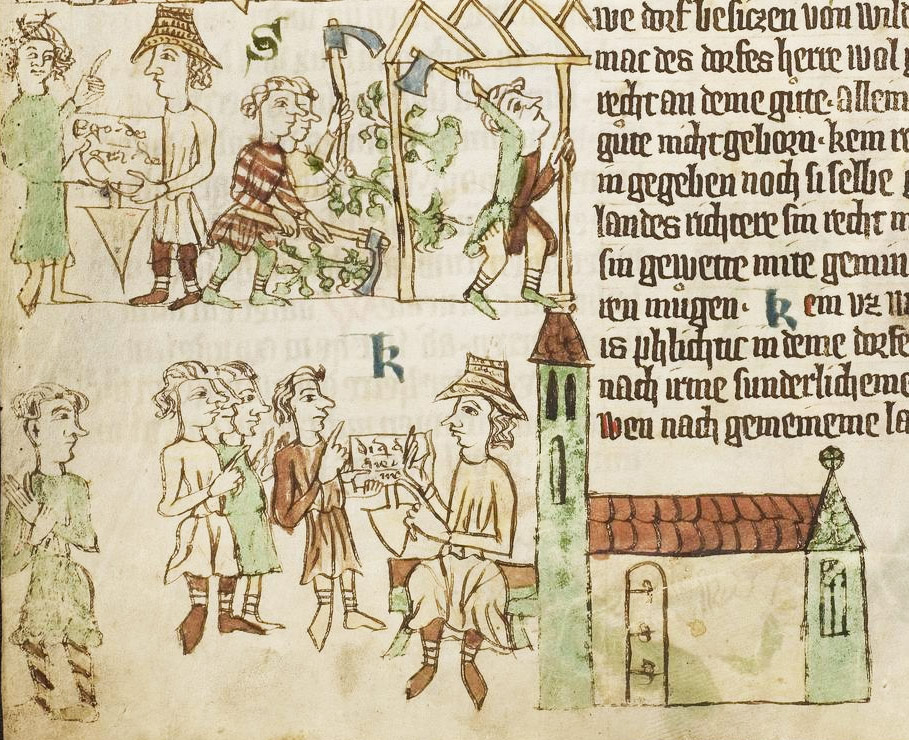
Sachsenspiegel depicting the Ostsiedlung: the locator (with his special hat) receives the foundation charter from the landlord. Settlers clear the forest and build houses. The locator acts as the judge in the village.

The Ostsiedlung probably started with the arrival of German monks in the entourage of Bolesław I, who spent part of his life in Thuringia, when he returned from exile in the Holy Roman Empire. These Cistercian monks from the Saxon abbey of Pforta were brought into the country by the duke to establish Lubiąż Abbey. The monks received permission to settle Germans on their possessions, which in turn were excluded from Polish law "for all time" and instead encouraged to use their own German law. This approach became exemplary for later German settlements, but the German law also replaced older Slavic and Polish laws in existing settlements. Towns were chartered with the codified German town law, most of the time either Magdeburg law or local Silesian variants like Środa Śląska/Neumarkt law (Latin: ius Theutonicum Srodense, ius Theutonicum Noviforense ), which was a variant of Halle law. Existing towns received German town law often before the Mongol invasion in 1241. Examples include Wrocław, Oława, Sobótka and Środa Śląska.

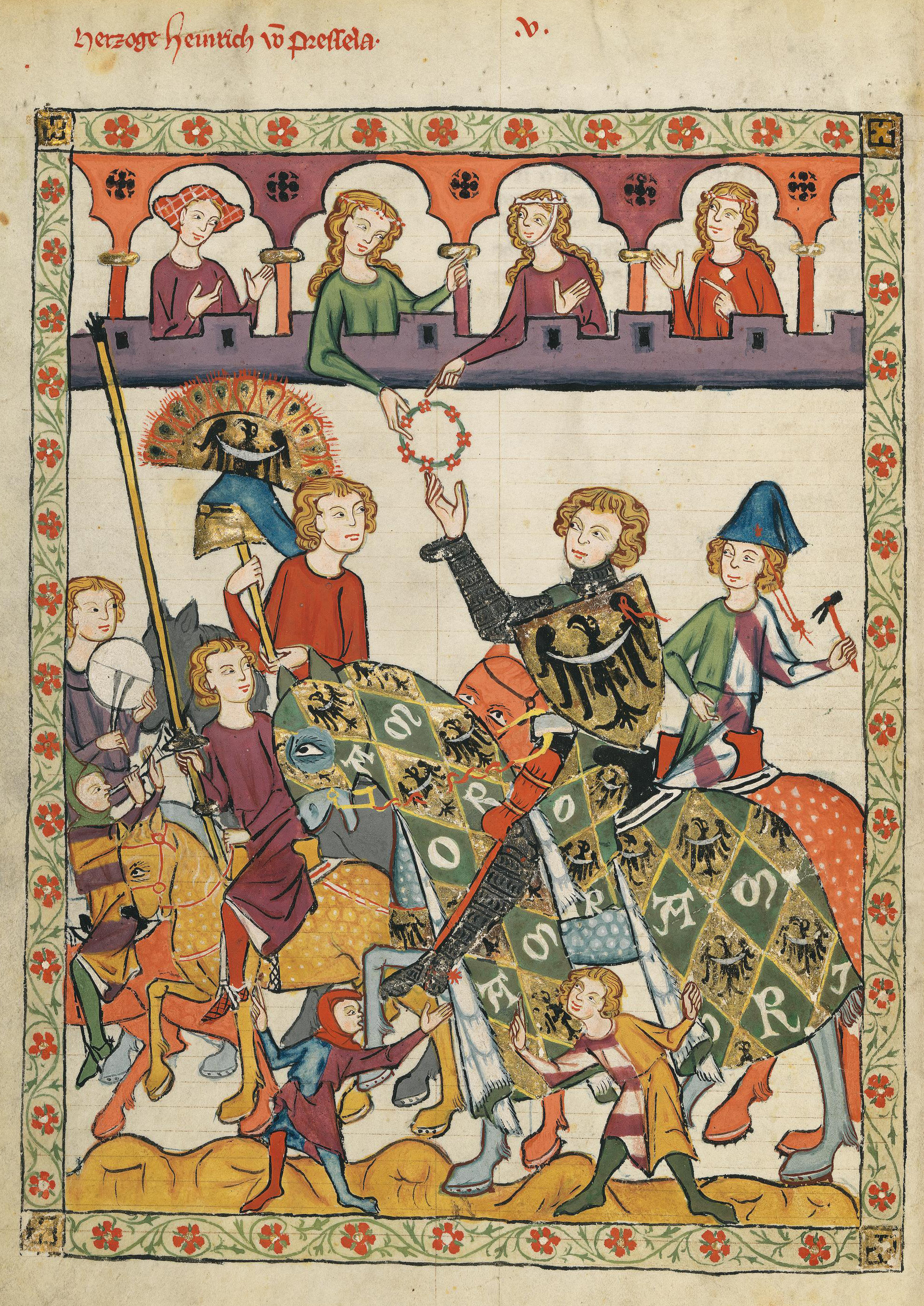
A depiction of most likely Henryk IV Probus.

After slow beginnings in the late 12th century the German Ostsiedlung fully started in the early 13th century, initiated and supported by duke Henry I, the first Slavic ruler outside of the Holy Roman Empire to invite German settlers on a wider base. At this time, the eastern border of the German settlement area was still some 130 kilometres (81 miles) from Silesia. Border security was Henry I's primary goal, which led him to locate the earliest German settlements in the area of the Preseka, built by colonists from Middle Germany. They later moved into the border forests outside the Preseka. Colonization first affected the region on the western border together with the subsequent southwestern area along the Sudete mountains. German villages soon also appeared in forest islands inside Slavic settlement areas, for instance in a triangle between Wrocław, Legnica and Ząbkowice Śląskie. A second goal of the duke was better exploitation of resources with the help of more advanced technologies of German miners, which led to the foundation of the mining towns of Goldberg (present Polish: Złotoryja ) in 1211 and Löwenberg (Polish: Lwówek Śląski ) in 1217, some of the earliest German towns in Silesia. These towns had a typical architecture being centered around a central square, the Ring, which became known in Polish as Rynek.

While the German settlement in Lower and Middle Silesia steadily progressed, it advanced much slower in Upper Silesia. Before 1241 settlements cam because of outside pressure from Moravia, which invited German settlers after 1220.

The Mongolian invasion of 1241 inflicted casualties in Silesia, limited to a narrow strip from Opole to Wrocław and Legnica. The time after 1241 was marked by a strong expansion of German settlement activities, mostly carried out by people from older German places in Silesia. Colonization affected the mountains in the south of Lower and Middle Silesia, the Lower and Middle Silesian regions to the right of the Oder and Upper Silesia. During the time many Polish places received German law, often with the help of German settlers.

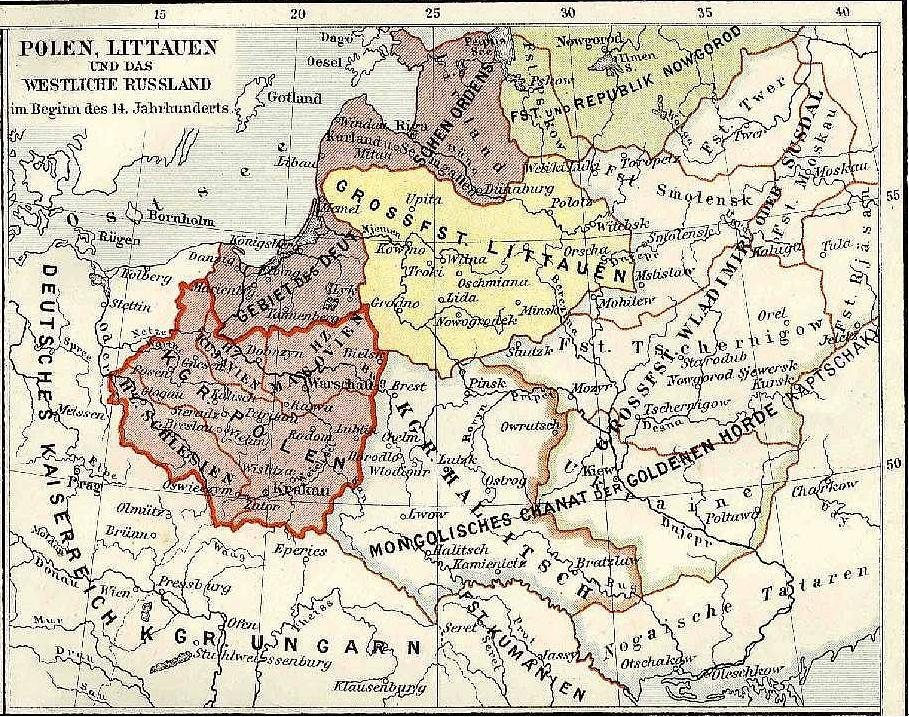
Silesia within Poland in the early 14th century

At the end of the 13th century all regions in Silesia except for some small outer zones in the east were affected by colonization. Because of migration Silesia's population density, the forms of settlement and the population changed dramatically. Large, well-planned villages became the norm. A network of almost 130 towns covered the country almost evenly, with a distance from town to town of approximately 18 km (11 mi) . The Weichbild constitution replaced the old Slavic castellany constitution. Every village built its own church (at the end of the 13th century numbering 1,200) the network of parishes also became much more dense, and the diocese was split into the archdeaconries of Breslau, Glogau, Opole and Liegnitz. There are different estimates of the population of Silesia in the 14th century. They vary from approximately 500,000 people, to over 1,000,000 in 1400 and 1,200,000 in 1500. It is estimated that in the year 1400 some 30,000 Czechs and 30,000 Germans inhabited Upper Silesia along with a Polish population of 240,000 (80%). In Lower Silesia the number of Poles and Germans has been estimated as around 375,000 for each language group. After the era of German colonization, the Polish language was still predominant in Upper Silesia and parts of Lower and Middle Silesia north of the Oder river. Here, the Germans who arrived during the Middle Ages were mostly Polonized; the Germans dominated large cities and Poles lived mostly in rural areas. The Polish speaking territories of Lower and Middle Silesia, commonly described until the end of the 19th century as the Polish side were mostly Germanized in the 18th and 19th centuries, except for some areas along the northeastern frontier.

== Silesian duchies ==
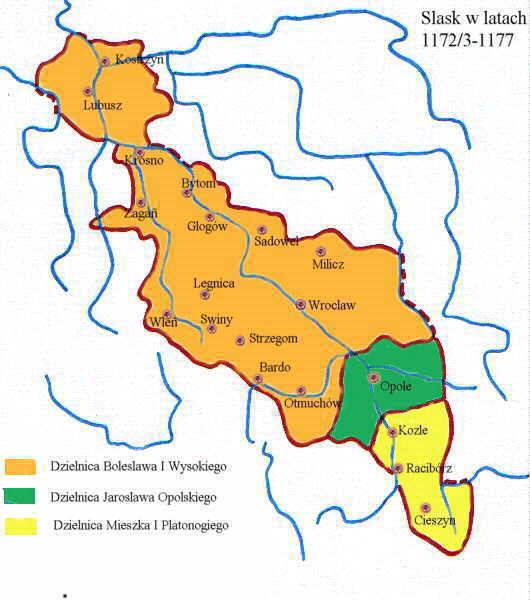
Duchies of Silesia: 1172–1177

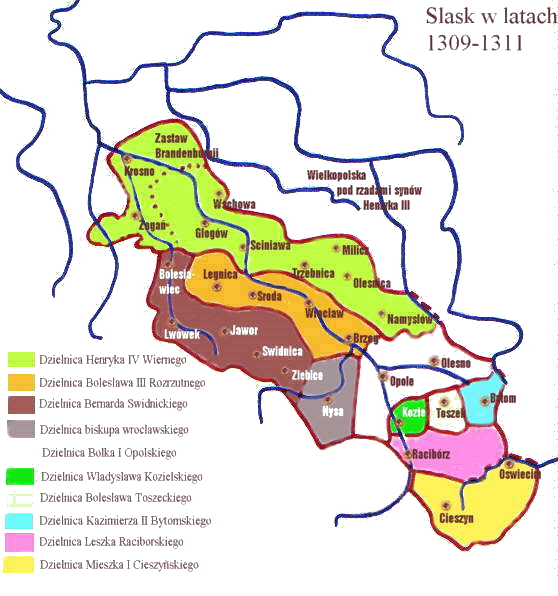
Duchies of Silesia: 1309–1311

After the death of Henry II the Pious his realm was divided between various Piast dukes. In the second half of the 13th century, Henry II's grandson, Henryk IV Probus of Silesia, made an attempt to gain the Polish crown, but he died in 1290 before realizing his goal. Duke Przemysł II of Greater Poland united two of the original provinces and was crowned in 1295, but was murdered in 1296. According to his will, Greater Poland was to be inherited by Duke Henryk III głogowski, (a Silesian duke of Głogów) who also aspired to unite Poland and even claimed the title Duke of Poland. However, most nobles supported another candidate from the Kuyavian line of Piasts, Duke Władysław I the Elbow-high. Władysław eventually won the struggle because of his broader support. In the meantime, King Wenceslaus II of Bohemia decided to extend his rule and was crowned as King of Poland in 1300. The next half-century was rife with wars between Władysław (later his son Casimir III the Great) and a coalition of Bohemians, Brandenburgers and Teutonic Knights trying to divide Poland. During this time, all Silesian dukes accepted Władysław's claims for sovereignty over other Piasts. After acquiring papal consent for his coronation, all nine dukes of Silesia declared twice (in 1319 before and in 1320 after the coronation) that their realms lay inside the borders of the Polish Kingdom. In 1337 the Czech king John of Bohemia sold the area of Prudnik to Duke Bolesław the Elder, thus making it a part of Silesia.

The last independent Silesian Piast, Bolko II of Świdnica, died in 1368. His wife Agnes ruled the Świdnica duchy until her death in 1392. Thereafter all Silesian Piasts became vassals of the Bohemian Crown.

Despite the shift of the Silesia province from Poland to Bohemia and the treaties mentioned above, medieval lawyers of the Kingdom of Poland created a specific claim to all formerly Polish provinces that were not reunited with the rest of the country in 1320. It employed the theory of the Corona Regni Poloniae according to which the state (the Crown) and its interests were no longer strictly connected with the person of the monarch. Because of that no monarch could effectively renounce his claims to any of the territories that were historically and/or ethnically Polish. Those claims were reserved for the Crown, which in theory still covered all of the territories that were part of or dependent on the Polish Crown in 1138.

Over the following centuries, the lines of the Piast dukes of Silesia died out and were inherited by the Bohemian Crown:

- Opolska (of Opole) in 1314;
- Świdnicka (of Świdnica) in 1368;
- Oleśnicka (Oleśnica and Głogów) in 1476;
- Żagańska (of Żagań) in 1504;
- Woitowitz (of Woitowitz, Wrocław) in 1532;
- Cieszyńska (of Cieszyn) in 1625;
- and Brzesko-Legnicka (of Brzeg and Legnica) in 1675.

Although Friedrich Wilhelm, the last male Silesian Piast Duke of Teschen (Cieszyn) died in 1625, rule of the duchy passed to his sister Elisabeth Lucretia, wife of the duke of Liechtenstein, until her death in 1653 after which it reverted to the Bohemian crown under the Habsburg rulers.

By the end of the 14th century, the country had split into 17 principalities: Wrocław, Brzeg, Głogów, Jawor, Legnica, Ziębice, Oleśnica, Świdnica and Ścinawa in Lower Silesia; Bytom, Niemodlin, Koźle, Nysa, Opole, Racibórz, Strzelce Opolskie and Cieszyn in the Upper Silesia. The petty rulers of these sections focused on internecine quarrels and proved quite incompetent to check the lawlessness of their vassals. The country fell into a state of growing anarchy. Exceptions were some dukes of Lower Silesia, such as Henry I and Bolko I, and the above-named Henry II and IV, who succeeded in reuniting most of the nearby principalities.

== Kingdom of Bohemia ==
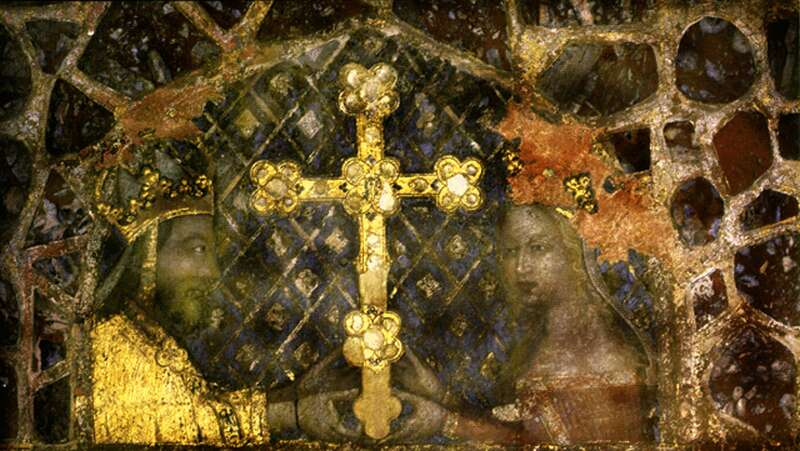
Charles IV, king of Bohemia, and his wife Anna of Schweidnitz. With this marriage the last independent duchy of Silesia passed to Bohemia.

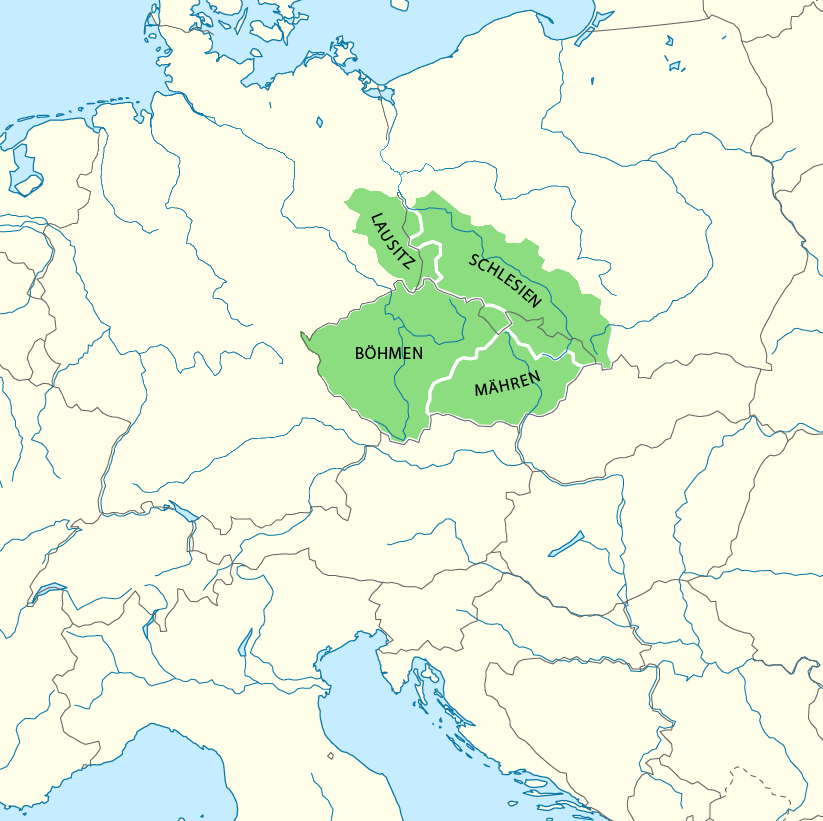
The whole of Silesia was one of the Lands of the Bohemian Crown until 1740.

Despite formal papal consent for the coronation, Wladyslaw's right to the crown was disputed by successors of Wenceslaus III (a king of both Bohemia and Poland) on the Bohemian throne. In 1327 John of Bohemia invaded. In 1327/29 the majority of the dukes of Silesia became dukes of Bohemia, while in 1331 the Duchy of Głogów and in 1336 the Duchy of Münsterberg were directly annexed by Bohemia. After the intervention of King Charles I of Hungary he left Polonia Minor, but on his way back he enforced his supremacy over the Upper Silesian Piasts.

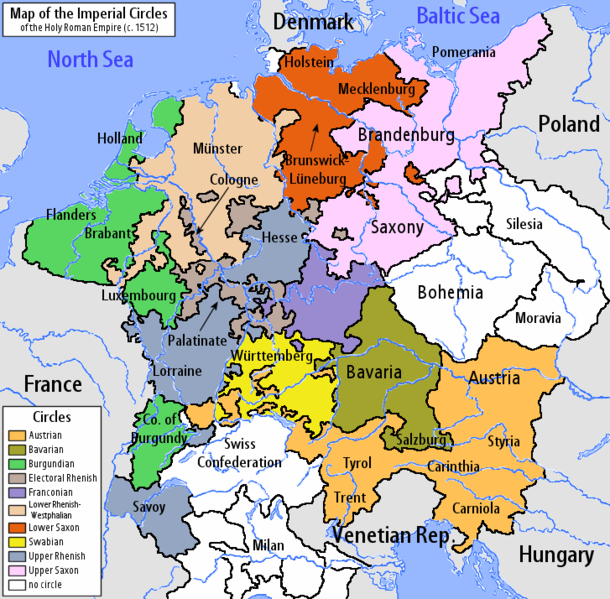
Silesia within the Holy Roman Empire of German Nation around 1512

In 1329 Władysław I the Elbow-high fought with the Teutonic Order. The Order was supported by John of Bohemia who dominated the dukes of Masovia and Lower Silesia.

In 1335 John of Bohemia renounced his claim in favour of Casimir the Great, who in return renounced his claims to Silesia. This was formalized in the Treaty of Trentschin and Congress of Visegrád (1335), ratified in 1339 and later after Polish-Czech war confirmed in the 1348 Treaty of Namslau. As a result, the Polish kingdom renounced any claims to Silesia "for all future times", making the border between the Holy Roman Empire and hence the Germanosphere in Silesia one of the longest lasting borders in Europe. Since 1512, the Empire was often termed the Holy Roman Empire of the German Nation, which paralleled the rise of the concept of a German nation.

The ties with Bohemia revived Silesia's economy, which until then mainly profited from the High Road, an important trans-European trade route. According to the wishes of the House of Luxembourg Breslau, Silesia's main emporium, established new contacts with Budapest and Venice to the south, Toruń and Gdańsk to the north and became a member of the Hanseatic League. The economic prosperity supported the development of a rich municipal culture, which found its expression in important religious and secular buildings as well as the attendance of many Silesians at the surrounding universities of Kraków, Leipzig and Prague (the most popular until the 1409 decree of Kutná Hora).

With the death of Charles IV in 1378 and the following disputes in the house of Luxemburg, Bohemia's protection of Silesia ended; strife spread and robber barons devastated the country. The regional public peaces, declared by local Silesian princes, did not change the situation, which became much worse in the following Hussite wars.

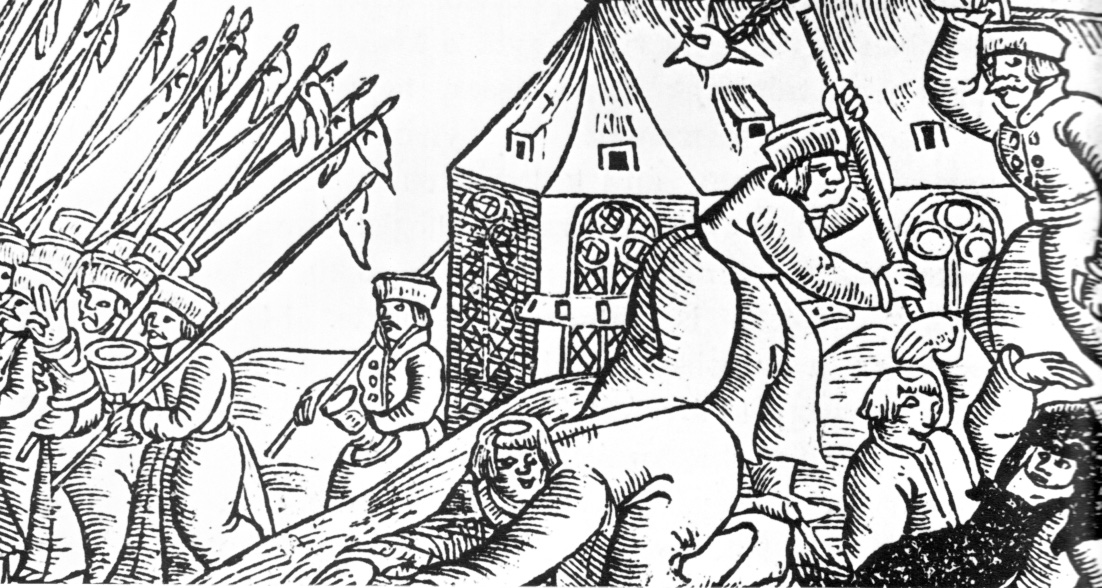
Hussite masacre.

The burning of Jan Hus at Konstanz increased religious and national agitation in Bohemia, which was tolerated by king Wenceslaus. After his death in 1419 the Czechs refused to accept Sigismund as their new king as they held him responsible for Hus's death. Sigismund in return called a Reichstag in Wrocław, the first one to the east of the Elbe, to determine actions against the revolting Czechs. Eighteen Silesian rulers rendered homage to the king and promised help. In 1421 a Silesian army repeatedly invaded northeastern Bohemia, but was defeated by the Hussites. Moravia joined the Hussite movement, isolating Silesia and Lusatia in the Bohemian lands, which regions became the foremost objects of hate for the radical Taborites. In January 1425 the Hussites established permanent pressure on Silesian lands, via raids labeled "beautiful rides". After 1427 the Hussites—supported by some Polish lords (Dobiesław Puchała, Sigismund Korybut) and Silesian dukes (Bolko V the Hussite)—invaded Silesia many times, destroyed more than 30 towns and ravaged the country. On the other hand, united armies of local dukes and wealthy towns (Breslau etc.) plundered Bohemian-Silesian borderland and eastern Bohemia (area around Náchod and Trutnov). Some Silesian towns, like Gliwice, Kluczbork, Niemcza or Otmuchów, became Hussite bases for several years and were a constant threat to nearby regions. The Hussite menace lasted until 1434, when they were defeated by the more moderate Utraquists at Lipany in Bohemia. Sigismund became king of Bohemia and united Silesia (except lands of Bolko V) by a public peace and the appointment of bishop Konrad, duke of Oels, as senior governor (German: Oberlandeshauptmann ).

=== Dueling kings ===
The death of Sigismund in 1437 was followed by challenges. The Bohemian crown was disputed between Albert II of Habsburg and Władysław III of Poland. After Albrecht's early death in 1439 his widow Elisabeth renewed these claims. Silesia, lying between Poland and Bohemia, again became a battleground. The majority of Silesian princes supported Elisabeth. After Wladislaus died in 1444, Bohemia's interim regent George of Poděbrady was elected king in 1458 and enfeoffed his two sons with the Silesian duchies of Münsterberg (Ziębice) and Opava (Troppau), and Bohemian territory Kladsko (Glatz), which thereby became closer to Silesia. He appointed Czech peers as governors of Silesian hereditary principalities and thus made Czech the official language for large parts of Silesia.

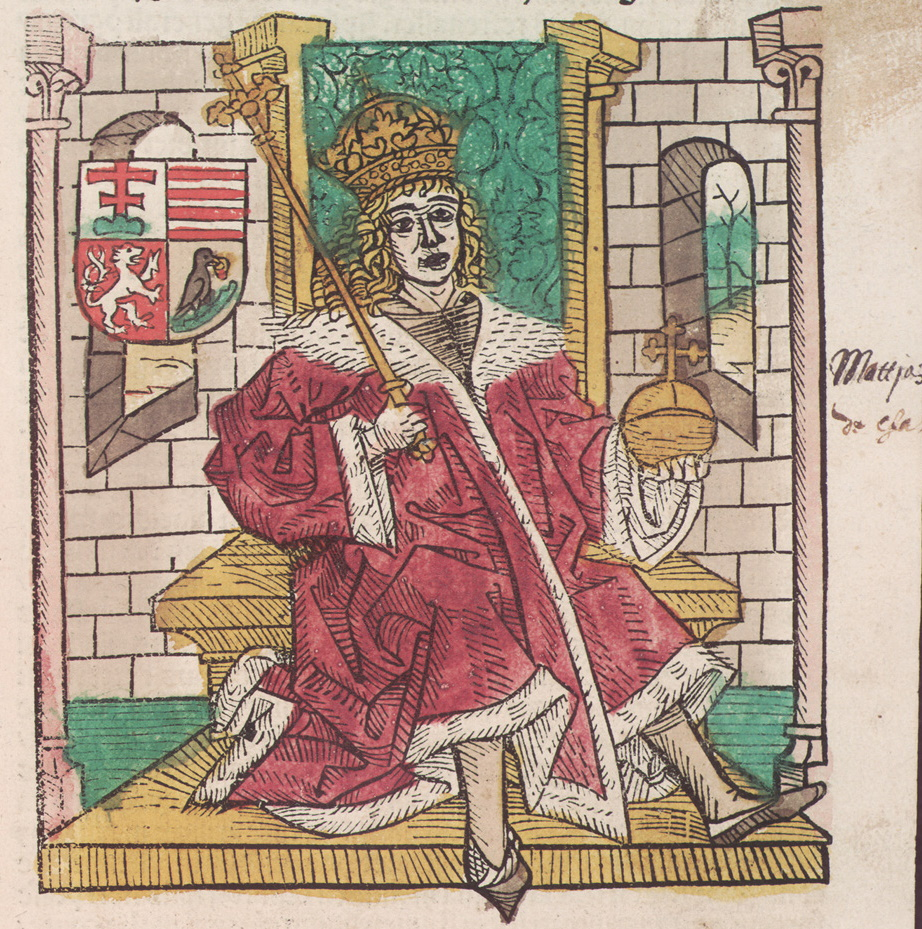
Matthias Corvinus, anti-king of Bohemia and overlord of Silesia.

George of Podiebrad's enemies in 1469 elected Matthias Corvinus, king of Hungary and former son-in-law of George, as a rival king of Bohemia. The power struggle between the two was predominantly carried out in Silesia and Moravia. The fighting continued after George's death in 1471 under his underage successor Vladislaus. After long battles a compromise was found: both kept their title, while Vladislaus received the Bohemian heartland and Matthias took Moravia, Lusatia and Silesia.

=== Division ===
The internal development of Silesia during the 15th century was marked by these external insecurities. Some peripheral regions of Silesia were lost. Siewierz was acquired by the bishop of Kraków in 1443 and formally incorporated into Poland only in 1790. Duchies of Oświęcim (in 1457) and Zator (in 1494) were sold to kings of Poland and were incorporated into the Kingdom in 1564. Other parts of Silesia were acquired by non- Silesian dynasties like the Wettins, who gained Sagan, or the House of Brandenburg, which gained the Duchy of Krosno. In 1523, George, Margrave of Brandenburg-Ansbach bought Duchy of Karniów for 58900 Hungarian guldens. He was succeeded by his son and later by two margraves of Brandenburg. Hohenzollerns were eventually deprived of the Duchy of Karniów in 1620, during the Thirty Years' War.

After the death of the last Piast duke of Opole-Racibórz in 1532, his duchy was pawned to Margrave George for 183 333 guldens and remained in his possession till 1549. Between 1645 and 1666 duchy of Opole and Racibórz was in possession of the Polish monarchs from the House of Vasa. Bytom was acquired by Margrave George in 1532 and was lost by the Hohenzollerns in 1620 together with the Duchy of Karniów. Duchy of Głogów was ruled by Polish monarchs: John I Albert and Sigismund I the Old between 1490 and 1508.

=== Decline ===
The economy declined, caused by the Hussite destruction and because trade avoided both Bohemia and Silesia due to the general insecurity. The new direct trading route between Leipzig and Poznań threatened Silesia's interests and was a reason for trade wars between Silesia and Poland. Breslau lost its staple right in 1515, and the trade on the High Road towards the Black Sea lost its importance after the Turkish occupation of Italian Black Sea colonies. The trade with Southeast Europe, especially Hungary, increased after the kings of Hungary became the overlords of Silesia, and the trade connections to Upper German cities also strengthened.

The population declined after the late 14th century because of an agricultural crisis, later intensified by the Hussite wars. Rural settlements were abandoned and cities lost a part of their population. This caused migration which led to mixing of Germans and Slavs. The Silesian minority soon adopted the language of the German majority. Most Polish linguistic enclaves in the south of Lower and Middle Silesia disappeared; these regions became largely German. In the western part of Silesia the Polish language survived only in the region around Zielona Góra (Grünberg) and Otyń (Deutsch Wartenberg) and in the agricultural plain to the left of the Oder in a triangle between Wrocław (Breslau), Kąty Wrocławskie (Kanth), Strzelin (Strehlen) and Oława (Ohlau). Almost all German linguistic enclaves in Upper Silesia had vanished in the 16th century. Only the towns of Opava (Troppau), Kietrz (Katscher) and Bielsko (Bielitz) remained largely German. This process was moreover encouraged by the often use of Czech as the official language in Upper SIlesia at that time, as both languages were still closely related.

Efforts to implement a constitution for all Silesian estates and thus unite the fragmented country were positive aspects of the 16th century. Sigismund's attempts in the 15th century were only temporarily successful, while Matthias Corvin's reforms achieved more. The king always had representatives in Silesia, for a short time called Oberlandeshauptleute (senior governors), otherwise called advocates. Sometimes these advocates were split between Upper and Lower Silesia; these terms appeared for the first time in the 15th century. The Fürstentage ("Princely diet"), initially only irregular meetings, became yearly events, although sometimes split between Upper and Lower Silesia. The diets dealt with questions such as tax collection (tax demands by the overlord were a novelty), troop deployment or coinage. A supreme "Princely court" (Czech: knížecí soud; German: Fürstenrecht) was established for the first time in 1498 to settle disputes between the king (then Vladislaus II of Bohemia and Hungary), the princes and barons (free lords) & the estates of 3 duchies: Głogów (Glogau), Opole-Racibórz and Żagań (Sagan).

== Habsburg Monarchy ==
After the death of King Louis II of Hungary and Bohemia in 1526, Ferdinand I of Austria was elected King of Bohemia and thus ruler of the Crown of Bohemia (including Silesia). In 1537, the Piast Duke Frederick II of Brieg concluded the Treaty of Brieg with Elector Joachim II of Brandenburg, whereby the Hohenzollerns of Brandenburg would inherit the Duchy of Brieg upon the extinction of the Piasts, but Ferdinand rejected the treaty.

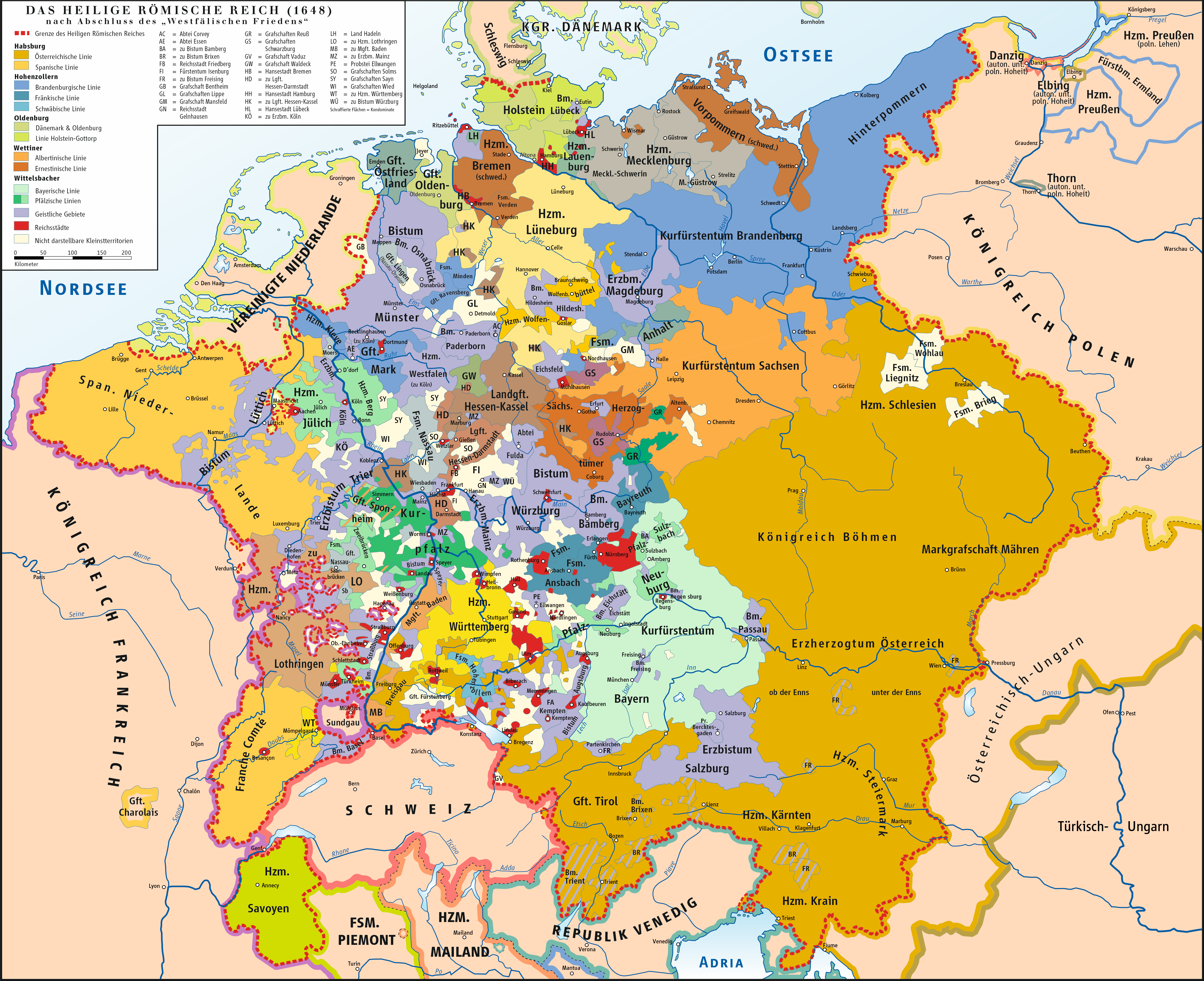
Silesia within the Holy Roman Empire under the House of Habsburg

=== Reformation ===
The Protestant Reformation took an early hold in Silesia. Its leading advocates were Frederick II of Liegnitz and George von Ansbach-Jägerndorf, who promoted the adoption of the new faith in his own duchy and in the pledged duchies of Oppeln and Ratibor. Breslau not only adopted the faith but, as the seat of the Provincial governor, also promoted Protestantism in Breslau. After the death of Ferdinand I in 1564 only the bishop of Breslau, the rulers and lordships of Loslau, Pleß and Trachenberg and 10% of the population remained Catholic. Silesia became closer to the center of the Protestant Reformation, Brandenburg and Saxony, and the country produced several important Protestant intellectuals. In 1526 Silesia received the first Protestant university of Europe when Frederick II opened an evangelical academy in Liegnitz. This school closed three years later due to economic difficulties and theological disputes between Lutherans and followers of Caspar Schwenckfeld, a sectarian and confidant of Frederick II whose ideas became popular.

The Protestant confession was not persecuted by Ferdinand I and Maximilian II, only Schwenckfeld, Anabaptists and unhallowed clergymen were not accepted. This changed with the accession of Rudolf II to the throne and with the help of archduke Carl, bishop of Breslau.

To end the oppression of their faith, the estates of Silesia joined the Protestant estates of Bohemia and stopped paying taxes to the emperor in 1609. After the Bohemians forced the emperor to issue his Maiestas Rudolphina (Letter of Majesty), he was moved to publish another similar letter for Silesia containing further rights. When Rudolf tried to withdraw from these agreements in 1611, the estates of Bohemia and Silesia declared allegiance to Matthias, who already owned the Archduchy of Austria, the Margraviate of Moravia and the Kingdom of Hungary. Matthias affirmed the Letter of Majesty and granted the Silesian estates an independent German chancellery in Prague (also responsible for both Lusatias). Silesian Protestants were weakened when several Silesian rulers converted to Calvinism or back to Catholicism.

After Matthias presumed heir, the staunch Catholic Ferdinand II, was elected to the Bohemian throne, he began to enforce the Catholic faith. After the second Defenestration of Prague in 1618 the Silesian Estates followed the Bohemian Revolt, elected Frederick V as their new King of Bohemia and paid homage in Breslau. Losing the Battle of White Mountain forced Frederick to flee to Breslau where he failed to gather new troops and advised the Silesians to contact Saxony, which occupied Lusatia, and as an imperial ally was authorized to negotiate. The subsequent Dresden accord spared Silesia for the next few years and affirmed the earlier privileges, however the Silesian Estates had to pay 300.000 gulden and accept Ferdinand II as their suzerain. Soon after the emperor (which secured the formerly elective Bohemian Crown as an inheritable possession of the Habsburg dynasty) together with the prince-bishop started the counter-reformation by inviting Catholic orders to Silesia and giving land to Catholic peers.

=== Thirty Years' War ===
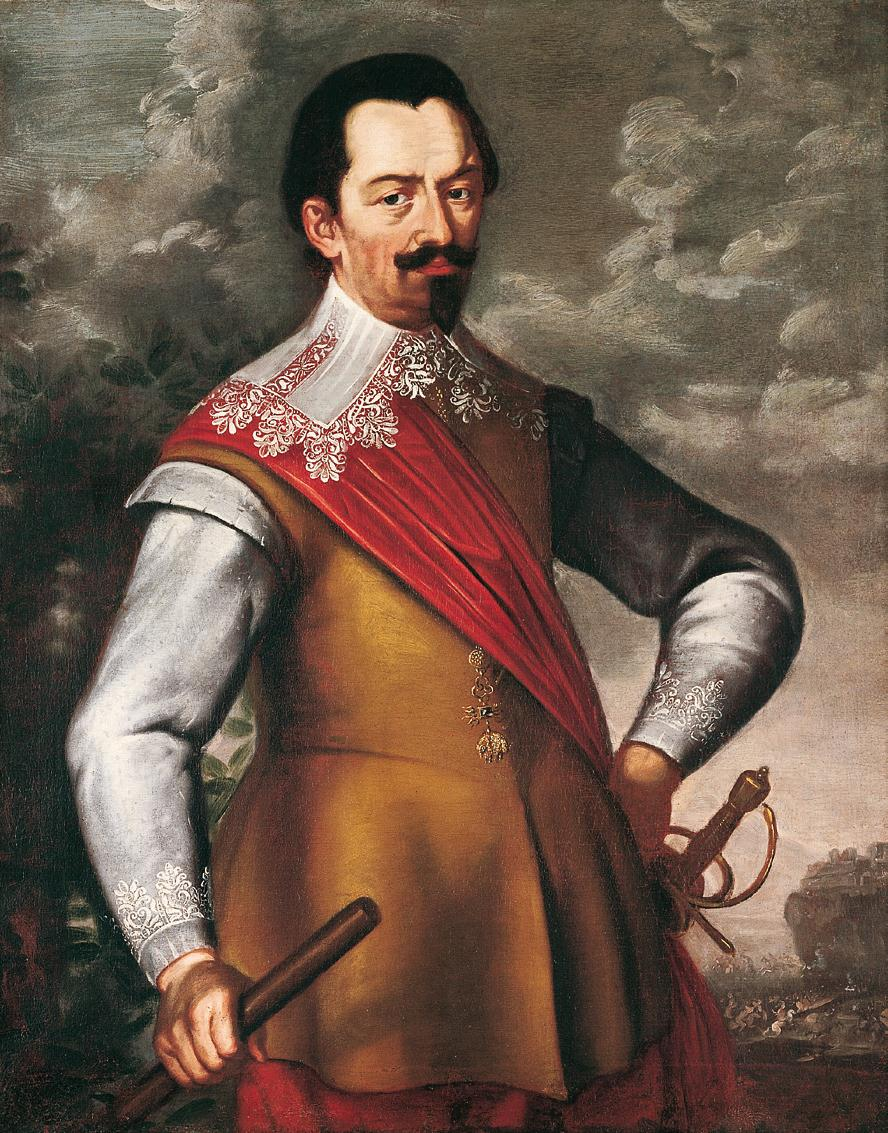
Albrecht von Wallenstein owned the Duchy of Sagan.

The Thirty Years' War reached Silesia when Protestant Ernst von Mansfeld started a military campaign against Hungary and crossed Silesia in 1629. This gave the emperor the chance to send troops against him and occupy the country. The Silesian district authority became an imperial office. Albrecht von Wallenstein became lord of the Duchy of Sagan and of Glogau. The infamous Liechtenstein dragoons pressed the citizens of the principalities back into the Catholic Church or otherwise expelled them. Protestant landlords lost their possessions and were replaced by Catholic families.

In 1632 the Protestant countries of Saxony, Brandenburg and Sweden, which were united against the emperor, invaded Silesia. The Protestant estates of Silesia joined them. However, as neighbouring Saxony sought peace in 1635, the Silesians lost this important ally, forcing them to again submit to the emperor. This time only the duchies of Liegnitz, Brieg, Wohlau, Oels and the town of Breslau kept their religious liberty.

The quiet years after 1635 were followed by new military conflicts between 1639 and 1648. Swedish and imperial troops devastated the country, cities were destroyed by fires and plagues, many people fled to the neighbouring countries of Brandenburg, Saxony or Poland, where they could freely express their faith, or to the countryside to escape the adverse conditions in the cities.

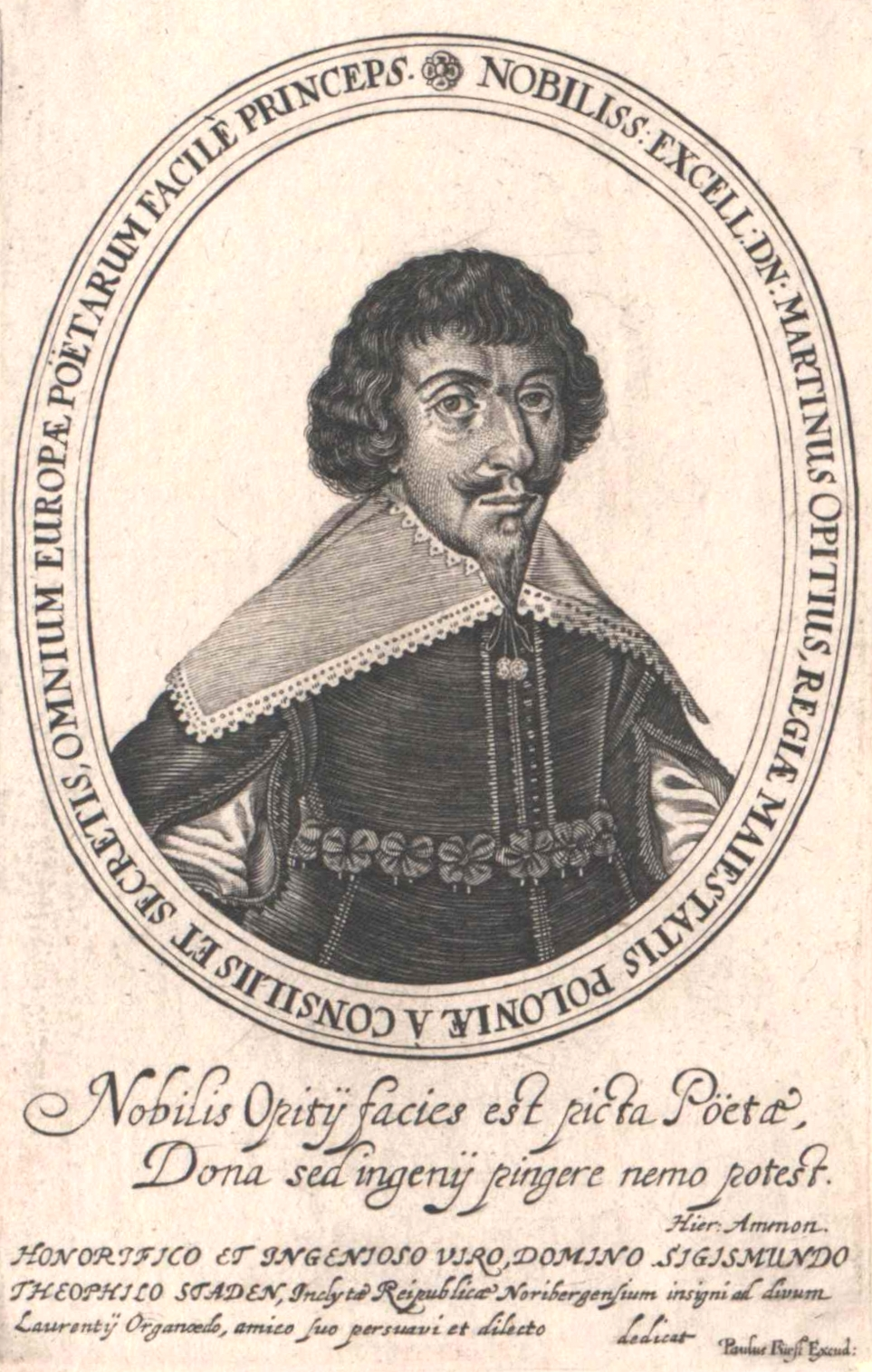
Martin Opitz, a leading German poet of its time.

The Peace of Westphalia ended the Thirty Years' War. The duchies of Liegnitz, Brieg, Wohlau, Oels and the city of Breslau retained religious freedom, and the construction of three Protestant churches, the Churches of Peace, was permitted. The systematic oppression of the Protestant faith was intensified in the rest of Silesia as most churches were closed or given to the few remaining Catholics. A new exodus to surrounding countries started, which led to the foundation of several new towns. Protestant churches close to the Silesian border, the so-called "border churches" (German: Grenzkirchen), were built to provide a place where Silesians could practise their religion.

In 1676 the Duchy of Legnica and Duchy of Brzeg passed to direct Habsburg rule after the death of the last Silesian Piast duke, Georg Wilhelm (son of Duke Christian of Brieg), despite the earlier inheritance pact by Brandenburg and Silesia, by which it was to go to Brandenburg.

These remaining Protestant duchies were re-Catholicized, but as Swedish king Charles XII pressed Joseph I to accept the treaty of Altranstädt (1707) the religious freedom in these duchies was restored. The construction of six further churches, the so-called "churches of mercy" (German: Gnadenkirchen; Czech: milostivé kostely), was allowed.

Due to the Thirty Years' War, diseases and emigration, Silesia lost large parts of its population. Some of its cities recovered only in the 19th century. Despite the uncertain political, economic and religious circumstances, Silesia became the center of German Baroque poetry in the 17th century. Its most important representatives were Martin Opitz, Friedrich von Logau, Andreas Gryphius or Christian Hoffmann von Hoffmannswaldau, along with writers and mystics including Angelus Silesius, Abraham von Franckenberg or Christian Knorr von Rosenroth.

=== Polish rule over Upper Silesia ===
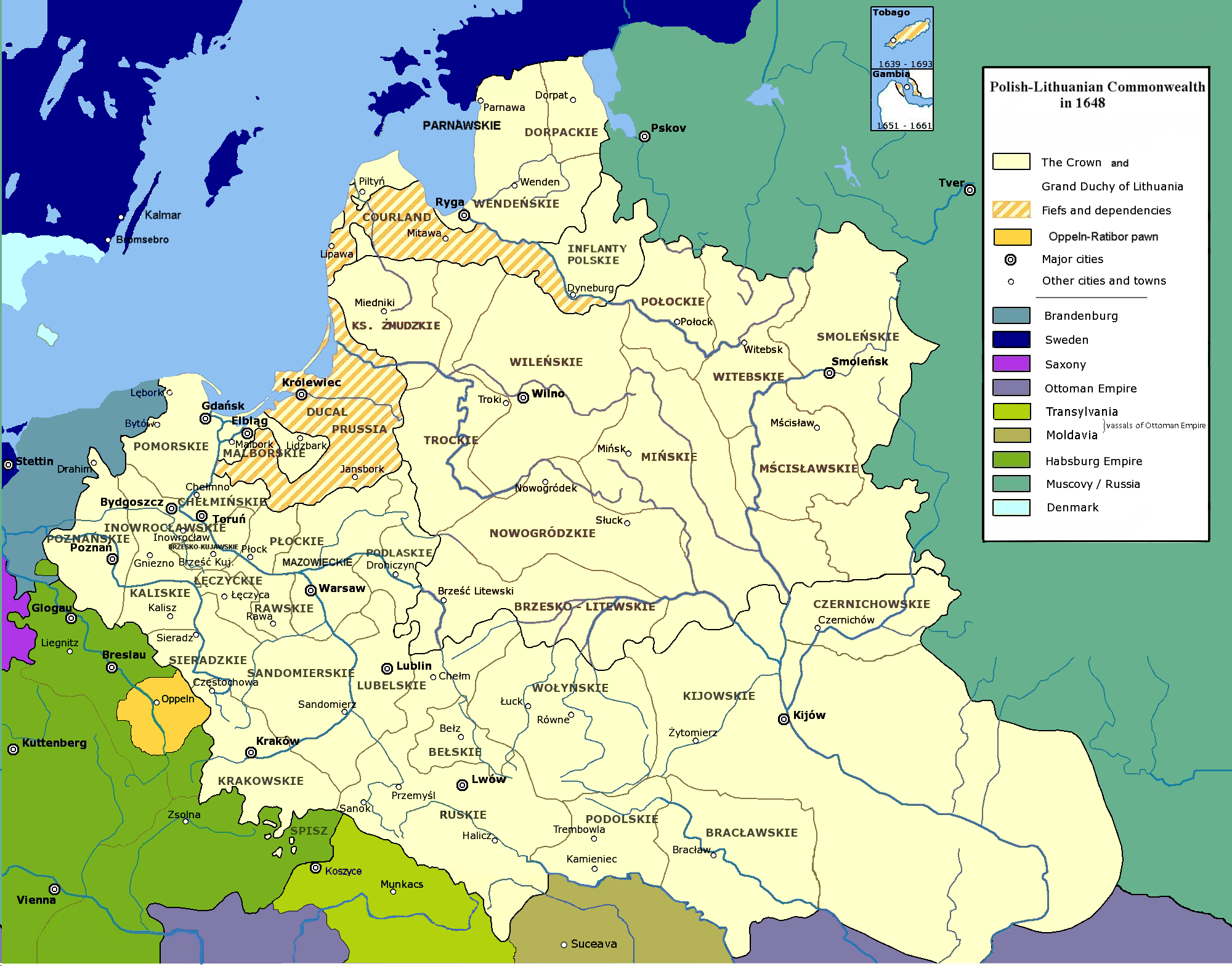
Polish–Lithuanian Commonwealth and Duchy of Opole and Racibórz in 1648

Beginning with the reign of Sigismund III Vasa (18 September 1587 – 19 April 1632) Upper Silesia once again caught the fancy of the Polish kings. After the loss of the Swedish throne, the Polish branch of the House of Vasa desperately needed to strengthen their position in Poland, where they were only elected monarchs while in Sweden they had been hereditary rulers. This led to negotiations between Polish and Habsburg emperors concerning Upper Silesia. The main attempt of the Polish diplomats was to obtain Duchy of Opole-Racibórz as an equivalent for the unpaid dowry of Anna of Austria and Constance of Austria both wives of Sigismund III. Initially unwilling to grant any compensation, in 1637 emperor Ferdinand III decided to resume negotiations after France offered Poland the whole of Upper Silesia if it joined France in the war. At this point king Władysław IV Vasa had obtained possession only of several estates scattered throughout Bohemia with no land connection to Poland. The situation changed again when the kingdom of Sweden rejoined the anti-Habsburg coalition and invaded Silesia. Swedish forces captured most of the important cities in Lower Silesia and marched into Upper Silesia. In 1641 Władysław IV began negotiating with Danemark in order to convince this country to join the Habsburgs against Sweden. For his help he demanded that his estates in Bohemia be exchanged for the Duchy of Opole-Racibórz. After heavy defeats in Upper Silesia (loss of Opole, Koźle, Namysłów), Ferdinand III finally agreed to Władysław's proposals in 1644. The agreement signed in 1645 granted Władysław and other successors of his father - Sigismund III - the title of Duke of Opole-Racibórz. The rights of the House of Vasa were to last for 50 years unless the line of Sigismund died out or the duchy was repurchased by the Habsburgs. The reign of Polish kings and princes resulted in a lasting peace in Upper Silesia, because at this point the Swedes did not want open conflict with Poland. This also strengthened economic and cultural ties between Upper SIlesia and Poland. The peace intensified trade and together with tolerance for the local Protestants gained Polish monarchs popularity in Upper Silesia.

During the reign of John II Casimir, the king, accompanied by his wife Marie Louise Gonzaga and the royal court, resided in the Duchy, after Poland was invaded by the Swedes in 1655. From Opole and Głogówek he commanded Polish forces. In the Franciscan church in Opole he issued the Opole proclamation in which he urged all Poles to the uprising against the Swedes.

The childless royal couple intended to conduct an election of a new monarch while John was still alive (election vivente rege). Their candidate was Henri Jules, Prince of Condé. In order to strengthen his position, the Duchy of Opole-Racibórz was passed to him as a dowry for his wife - Anne Henriette of Bavaria - the queen's niece. This was contested by emperor Leopold I who repurchased the Duchy on 21 May 1666 for 120 000 guldens. After the Habsburgs regained Upper Silesia, tolerance for the Protestant population ended and a program of counterreformation for the northern parts of the Duchy was introduced.

== Kingdom of Prussia ==
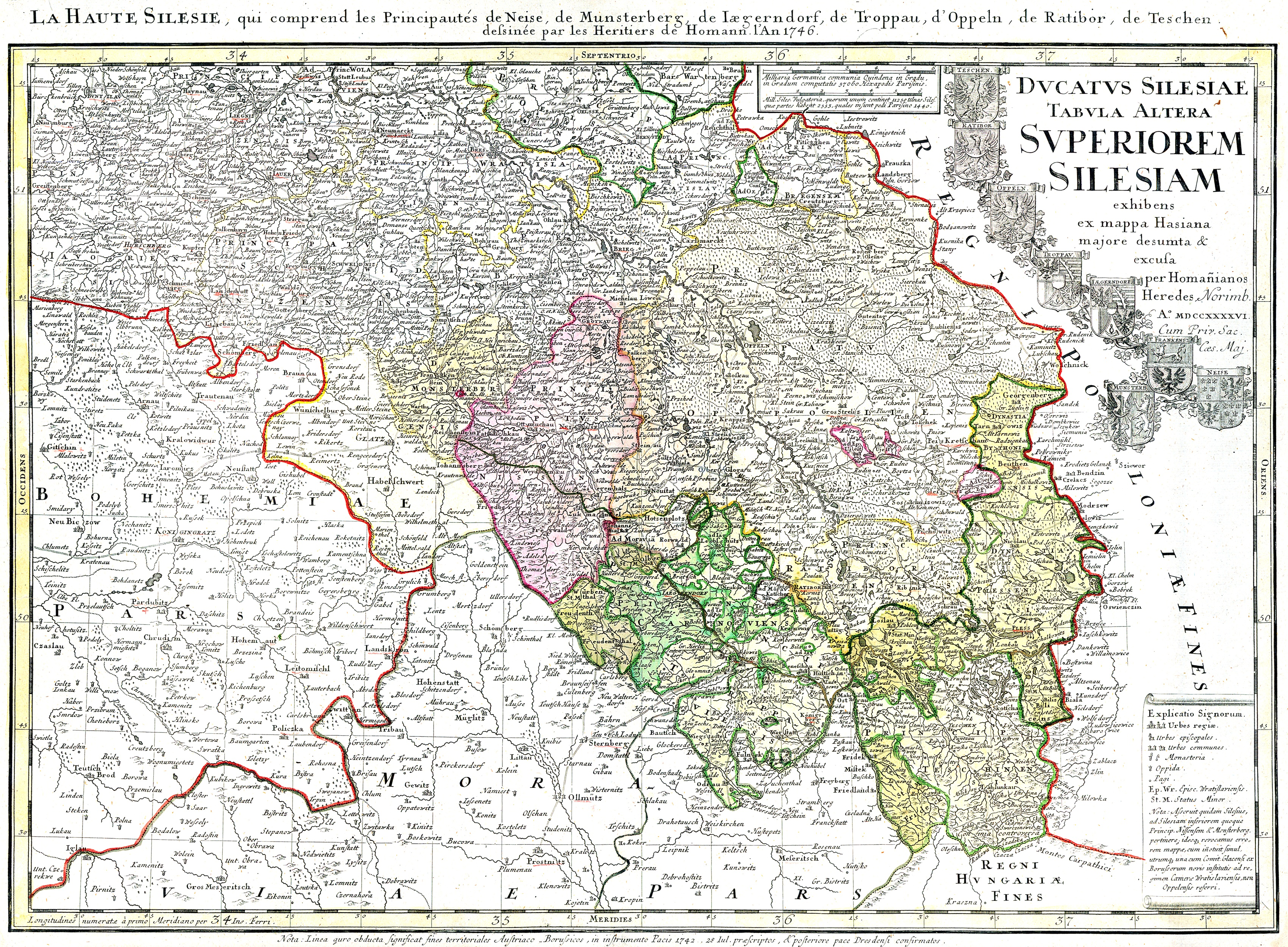
Map of Upper Silesia and the Duchies of Silesia, 1746

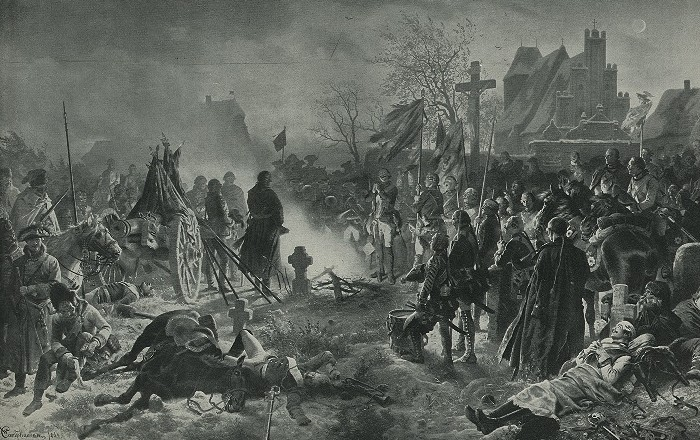
Frederick II after the Battle of Leuthen.

In 1740, the annexation of Silesia by King Frederick II the Great of Prussia was welcomed by many Silesians, not only by Protestants or Germans. Frederick based his claims on the Treaty of Brieg, and his 1740 invasion began the First Silesian War (part of the War of the Austrian Succession). By war's end, the Kingdom of Prussia had conquered almost all of Silesia, while some parts of Silesia in the extreme southeast, like the Duchy of Cieszyn and Duchy of Opava, remained possessions of the Crown of Bohemia and the Austrian Habsburg monarchy. The Third Silesian War (part of the Seven Years' War of 1756–1763) confirmed Prussian control over most of Silesia. As a result, the annexed part of Silesia ceased being part of the Holy Roman Empire and was ruled by Frederick not as a duke of the Empire but as king of Prussia.

During the War of the Austrian Succession, Prussia installed its own administration which met the needs of a modern state. Headed by a provincial minister (German: Provinzialminister) who was directly subordinate to the king, Silesia was split into two war- and domain chambers in Breslau and Glogau, which administrated 48 districts (German: Kreise, singular Kreis). Silesia thus maintained its exceptional position inside Prussia. Only the judicature was affiliated to the head of the respective Prussian department. Fortifications were strengthened and the number of soldiers increased tenfold.

=== Industry and mining ===
Silesian industry suffered badly after the war. To stimulate the economy Protestant Czechs, Germans and Poles were invited to settle in the country, particularly in Upper Silesia. Most of the settlers originated from non-Prussian countries, since Frederick II also wished to increase Prussia's population. The Poles, most from the Habsburg-ruled area around Teschen, settled all over Upper Silesia, whereas the Czechs mainly located in the areas around Oppeln, Strehlen and Groß Wartenberg. With the recruitment of Germans from Middle and Western Germany many mine and lumber settlements were established. Large estate owners soon followed and founded many new settlements. Frederick II supported the reconstruction of the cities, sometimes by donation from his privy purse, but more by measures to stimulate the economy, such as the ban on wool exports to Saxony or Austria and the increase of customs duties.

Mining and metallurgy reached special importance in the middle of the 18th century. In 1769 Silesia established a standardised mining law, the so-called "revidierte Bergordnung", which excused miners of subservience to the laird and placed them under the control of the upper mining authority (German: Oberbergamt) which first located in Reichenstein and later in Breslau. In the beginning the center of mining and also metallurgy was in Waldenburg and Neurode in Lower Silesia, but later moved to Upper Silesia.

Confessional restrictions were abolished already during the first Silesian war and, until 1752, 164 provisional churches, so called Bethäuser or Bethauskirchen, were built. The Moravian Church, a Protestant denomination, established several new settlements, among them Gnadenfrei (Polish: Pilawa Gorna), Gnadenberg (Polish: Godnow) and Gnadenfeld (Polish: Pawlowiczki). Although Frederick and the bishop of Breslau argued about the Catholic Church, the king supported the Catholic school system.

=== Napoleonic era ===
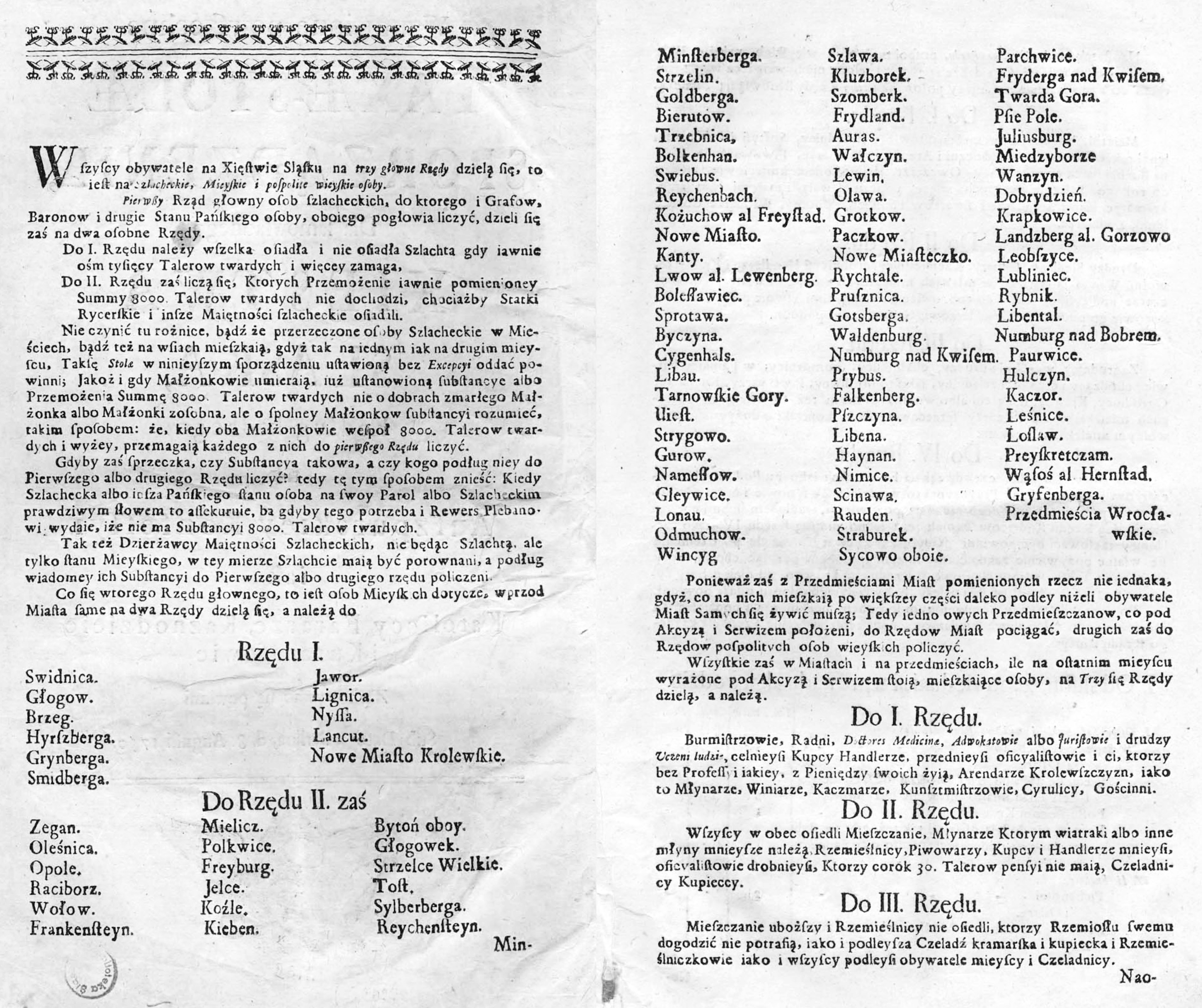
Popular usage of Polish place names in Silesia in the 18th century required issuing Polish documents. This one, dated from 1750, was published in Berlin during the Silesian Wars.

In 1806 confederates of Napoleon invaded Silesia. Only the forts of Glatz, Silberberg and Cosel withstood until the Treaties of Tilsit. After the adoption of the reforms of Stein and Hardenberg between 1807 and 1812 Silesia was fully incorporated into Prussia, the Catholic Church properties were secularized and the social and economic conditions improved. At the same time the first European university with both a Protestant and a Catholic faculty was established in Breslau.

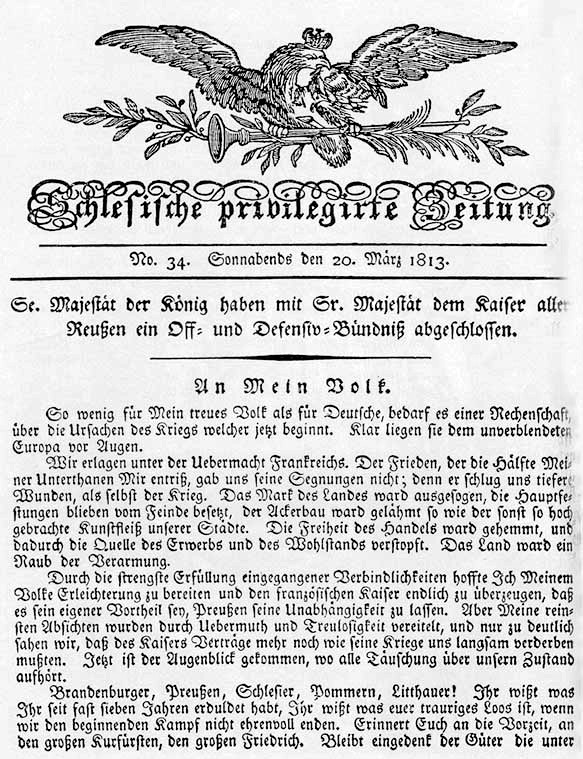
An mein Volk

In 1813 Silesia became the center of the revolt against Napoleon. The royal family moved to Breslau and Frederick William III published the letter An mein Volk (to my people) which called the German people to arms. The experience of the war of liberation strengthened the bond of Silesians to Prussia and the Province of Silesia became one of Prussia's most loyal provinces. Several military leaders of outstanding merit, including Blücher or Yorck von Wartenburg, received lavishly appointed country manors.

In 1815, the northeastern part of Upper Lusatia, formerly part of Saxony, was incorporated into the province, which was then divided into three government regions, Liegnitz, Breslau and Oppeln.

Already in the Middle Ages, various German dialects of the new-come settlers became widely used throughout Lower Silesia and some Upper Silesian cities. However, after the era of German colonization, the Polish language was still predominant in Upper Silesia and parts of Lower and Middle Silesia north of the Oder river. Germans usually dominated in large cities and Poles lived mostly in rural areas. This required the Prussian authorities to issue some official documents in Polish or both in German and Polish. The Polish speaking territories of Lower and Middle Silesia, commonly described until the end of the 19th century as the Polish side were mostly Germanized in the 18th and 19th centuries, except for some areas along the northeastern frontier.

=== Uprising of the Silesian weavers ===
Silesia's industry was in bad condition in the decades after 1815. Silesian linen weavers suffered under Prussia's free trade policy and British competitors that already used machines destroyed the competitiveness of Silesian linen. The situation worsened after Russia imposed an import embargo and the Silesian linen industry began to mechanize. In several towns this traditional craft died out altogether, costing many linen weavers their profession. As social conditions worsened, growing unrest culminated in the Silesian cotton weavers' uprising (German: Schlesischer Weberaufstand) of 1844. This uprising, on the eve of the revolution of 1848, was closely observed by German society and treated by several artists, among them Gerhart Hauptmann (with his 1892 play The Weavers) and Heinrich Heine (poem Die schlesischen Weber).

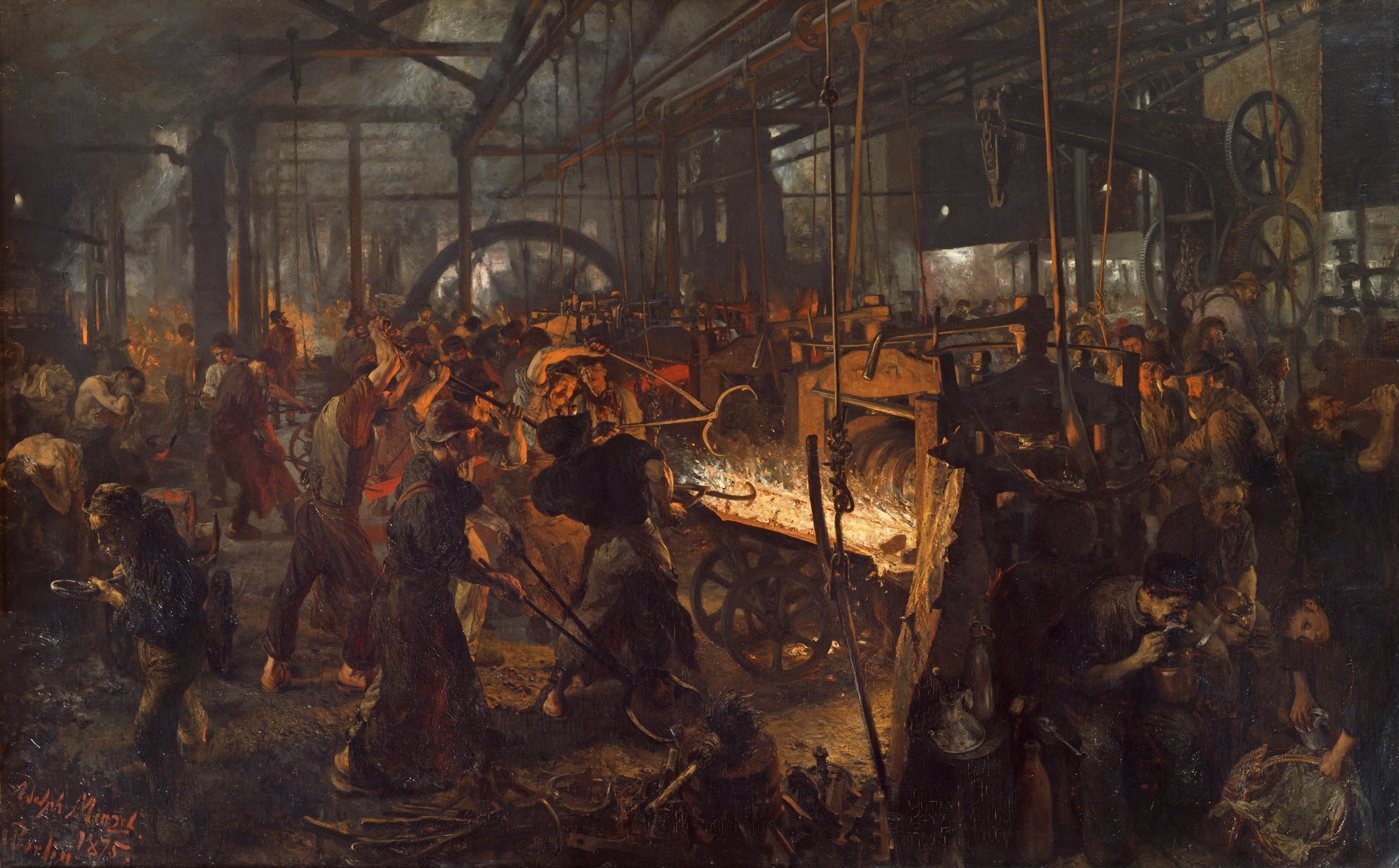
Steelwork in Königshütte, production of railway tracks, painting by Adolph Menzel.

The recovery of Silesian industry was closely connected to the railroad. The first railroad line was built between Breslau and the industrial region of Upper Silesia (1842–1846), followed by lines to the Lower Silesian industrial region around Waldenburg (Polish: Wałbrzych ) (1843–1853), to Berlin (1846), Leipzig (1847) and Vienna (1847/48). The fast-growing network of railroad lines supported new companies, which in turn led to growth of the industrial centers of Breslau, Waldenburg and in Upper Silesia, the second biggest industrial area in Germany at that time. The concentration of mining, metallurgy and factories in a small region like Upper Silesia resulted in enormous growth of the settled area, especially because of workers' villages next to mines and ironworks. The older cities of the area, Beuthen (Polish: Bytom) and Gleiwitz (Polish: Gliwice) could not meet the requirements anymore new municipal centers like Kattowitz (Polish: Katowice), Königshütte (Polish: Królewska Huta ) and Hindenburg (Polish: Zabrze) emerged, all chartered during that time.

The discontent of Silesians with the absolutism in Prussia found expression in the democratic revolt of 1848. The approval of the new constitution by the national assembly in Frankfurt imposed by the Prussian king led to uprisings in Breslau (May 6 and 7, 1849). Simultaneously, peasant revolts happened all over the country. These democratic efforts were oppressed by the Prussian state.

After the political situation stabilized in the 1860s and political parties evolved, the special status of Upper Silesia, driven by confessional, linguistic and national differences, began to develop.

== Population and national identity in Prussian Silesia ==
Early population statistics for Prussian Upper Silesia date from 1819. From 1890 onwards, Prussian censuses used mother tongue as the statistical criterion for nationality. The interpretation of these figures was complicated by differing understandings of mother tongue and the prevalence of bilingualism.

Between 1819 and 1910, the population of the Oppeln administrative district nearly quadrupled. The proportion of inhabitants recorded in the German category increased, while that recorded in the Polish category declined. These figures do not necessarily reflect corresponding changes in national identity.

In Upper Silesia, linguistic and national identities did not always coincide. Bilingualism was widespread, and the region's predominantly Catholic population shared religious traditions across linguistic boundaries. While German and Polish national movements attracted supporters, many Upper Silesians maintained overlapping local, religious and national loyalties.

Table 1. Population of the Oppeln administrative district by recorded demographic category, 1819–1910
Year	1819	1831	1840	1852	1861	1867	1890	1900	1905	1910
Polish	377,100 (67.2%)	443,084 (62.0%)	525,395 (58.6%)	584,293 (58.6%)	665,865 (59.1%)	742,153 (59.8%)	918,728 (58.2%)	1,048,230 (56.1%)	1,158,805 (57.0%)	Census, monolingual Polish: 1,169,340 (53.0%) or up to 1,560,000 together with bilinguals
German	162,600 (29.0%)	257,852 (36.1%)	330,099 (36.8%)	363,990 (36.5%)	409,218 (36.3%)	457,545 (36.8%)	566,523 (35.9%)	684,397 (36.6%)	757,200 (37.2%)	884,045 (40.0%)
Other	21,503 (3.8%)	13,254 (1.9%)	41,570 (4.6%)	49,445 (4.9%)	51,187 (4.6%)	41,611 (3.4%)	92,480 (5.9%)	135,519 (7.3%)	117,651 (5.8%)	Total population: 2,207,981

According to Georg Hassel's statistics for 1819, the Breslau administrative district had 833,253 inhabitants, of whom 755,553 were classified as Germans, 66,500 as Poles, 3,900 as Czechs and 7,300 as Jews.

According to Stanisław Plater, Prussian Silesia had approximately 2.2 million inhabitants in 1824, including 1,550,000 classified as Germans, 600,000 as Poles and 20,000 as Jews.

Population estimates for Prussian Silesia in the early 19th century (1800–1825)
Population category	acc. G. Hassel	%	acc. S. Plater	%	acc. T. Ładogórski	%
Germans	1,561,570	75.6	1,550,000	70.5	1,303,300	74.6
Poles	444,000	21.5	600,000	27.3	401,900	23.0
Sorbs	24,500	1.2	30,000	1.4	900	0.1
Czechs	5,500	0.3			32,600	1.9
Moravians	12,000	0.6				
Jews	16,916	0.8	20,000	0.9	8,900	0.5
Population	ca. 2.1 million	100	ca. 2.2 million	100	ca. 1.8 million	100

== German Empire and Austro-Hungarian Empire ==
As a Prussian province, Silesia became part of the German Empire during the unification of Germany in 1871. There was considerable industrialization in Upper Silesia, and many people migrated there. The overwhelming majority of the population of Lower Silesia was German-speaking and most were Lutheran, including the capital of Breslau. In Upper Silesia, Polish and local Silesian speech varieties were particularly widespread in rural areas. In the census of 1910, approximately 53% of the population of Upper Silesia reported Polish as their language and 40% reported German. In whole Upper Silesia Poles comprised 61,1% of the population in 1829, but due to state policy of forced germanization their numbers decreased to 58,6% of population 1849. The Kulturkampf set Catholics in opposition to the government and sparked a Polish revival, much of it fostered by Poles from outside of Germany, in the Upper Silesian parts of the province. The first conference of Hovevei Zion groups took place in Kattowitz (Katowice), German Empire in 1884.

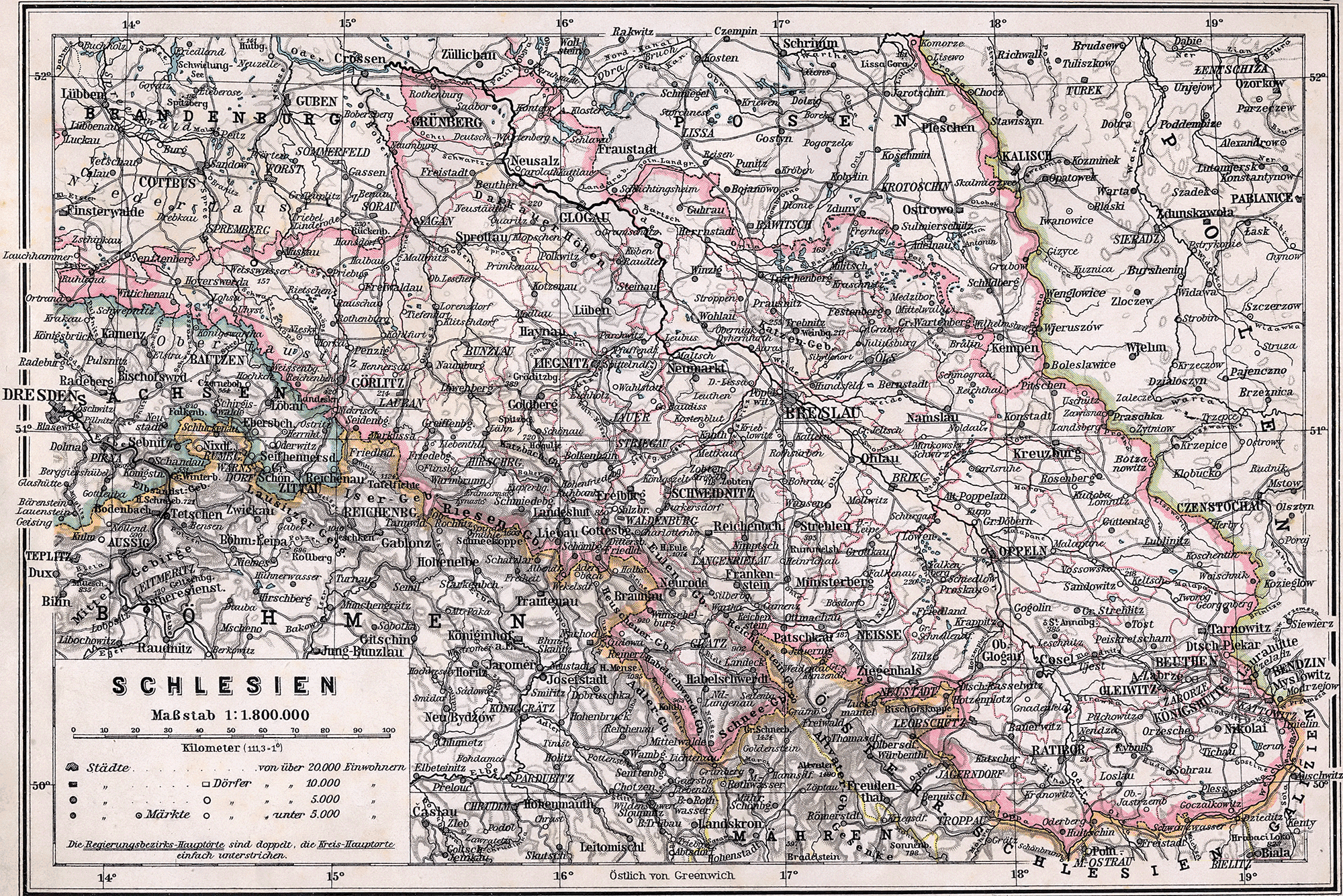
Imperial German Silesia 1905.

The population moved both to Silesia and to neighboring provinces. For example, a "typical" inhabitant of Berlin of 1938 would proverbially be a Silesian. (See also Ostflucht.)

At the same time, the areas of Ostrava and Karviná in Austrian Silesia became increasingly industrialized. A significant portion of the Polish-speaking people there were Lutherans, in contrast to the German-speaking Catholic Habsburg dynasty ruling Austria-Hungary.

In 1900, the population of Austrian Silesia numbered 680,422, or 132 inhabitants per square kilometre (340 inhabitants/mi^{2}). In the 1910 census, 43.9% of respondents in Austrian Silesia reported German as their language of everyday communication, 31.7% Polish and 24.3% Czech. Austrian censuses recorded the language of everyday communication (Umgangssprache) rather than national identity. Some 84% were Roman Catholics, 14% Protestants and the remainder were Jews. The local diet was composed of 31 members, and Silesia sent 12 deputies to the Reichsrat at Vienna. For administrative purposes Silesia was divided into 9 districts and 3 towns with autonomous municipalities: Opava (Troppau), the capital, Bielsko-Biała (Bielitz) and Frýdek-Místek (Friedeck). Other principal towns were: Cieszyn/Těšín (Teschen); Slezská Ostrava (Polnisch-Ostrau), the eastern part of Ostrava; Krnov (Jägerndorf); Karviná (Karwin); Bruntál (Freudenthal); Jeseník (Freiwaldau); and Horní Benešov (Bennisch).

== Interwar period and World War II ==
=== Division after 1918 ===
Division of Prussian Silesia between Weimar Germany, Poland and Czechoslovakia after World War I
Division of:	Area in 1910 in km^{2}	Share of territory	Population in 1910	After WW1 part of:	Notes
Lower Silesia	27,105 km^{2}	100%	3.017.981	Divided between:	
to Poland	526 km^{2}	2%	1%	Poznań Voivodeship (Niederschlesiens Ostmark)	(Note: After World War I Poland received a small part of historical Lower Silesia, with majority ethnic Polish population as of year 1918. That area included parts of counties Syców (German: Polnisch Wartenberg), Namysłów, Góra and Milicz. In total around 526 square kilometers with around 30 thousand inhabitants, including the city of Rychtal. Too small to form its own voivodeship, the area was incorporated to Poznań Voivodeship (former Province of Posen).)
to Germany	26,579 km^{2}	98%	99%	Province of Lower Silesia	
Upper Silesia	13,230 km^{2}	100%	2.207.981	Divided between:	
to Poland	3,225 km^{2}	25%	41%	Silesian Voivodeship	(Note: Interwar Silesian Voivodeship was formed from Prussian East Upper Silesia (area 3,225 km^{2}) and Polish part of Austrian Cieszyn Silesia (1,010 km^{2}), in total 4,235 km^{2}. After the annexation of Trans-Olza from Czechoslovakia in 1938, it increased to 5,122 km^{2}. Silesian Voivodeship's capital was Katowice.)
to Czechoslovakia	325 km^{2}	2%	2%	Hlučín Region	
to Germany	9,680 km^{2}	73%	57%	Province of Upper Silesia	

=== Interwar period ===
In the Treaty of Versailles, after the defeat of Imperial Germany and Austria-Hungary in World War I, it was decided that the population of Upper Silesia should hold a plebiscite to determine the division of the province between Poland and Germany, with the exception of a 333 km^{2} (129 sq mi) area around Hlučín (Hultschiner Ländchen), which was granted to Czechoslovakia in 1920 despite it being German-speaking majority. The plebiscite, organised by the League of Nations, was held in 1921. In Cieszyn Silesia there was an interim deal between the Polish Rada Narodowa Księstwa Cieszyńskiego and the Czech Národní výbor pro Slezsko about partition of past lands of the Duchy of Cieszyn along ethnic lines. However, that deal was not approved by the Czechoslovak government in Prague. Poland held elections in the entire disputed area, and on 23 January 1919, Czech troops invaded the lands of Cieszyn Silesia, stopping on 30 January 1919 on the Vistula River near Skoczów. The planned plebiscite was not organised in the Cieszyn Silesia but was held in most other parts of Upper Silesia. On 28 July 1920, the Spa Conference divided Cieszyn Silesia between Poland and Czechoslovakia along the present-day border.

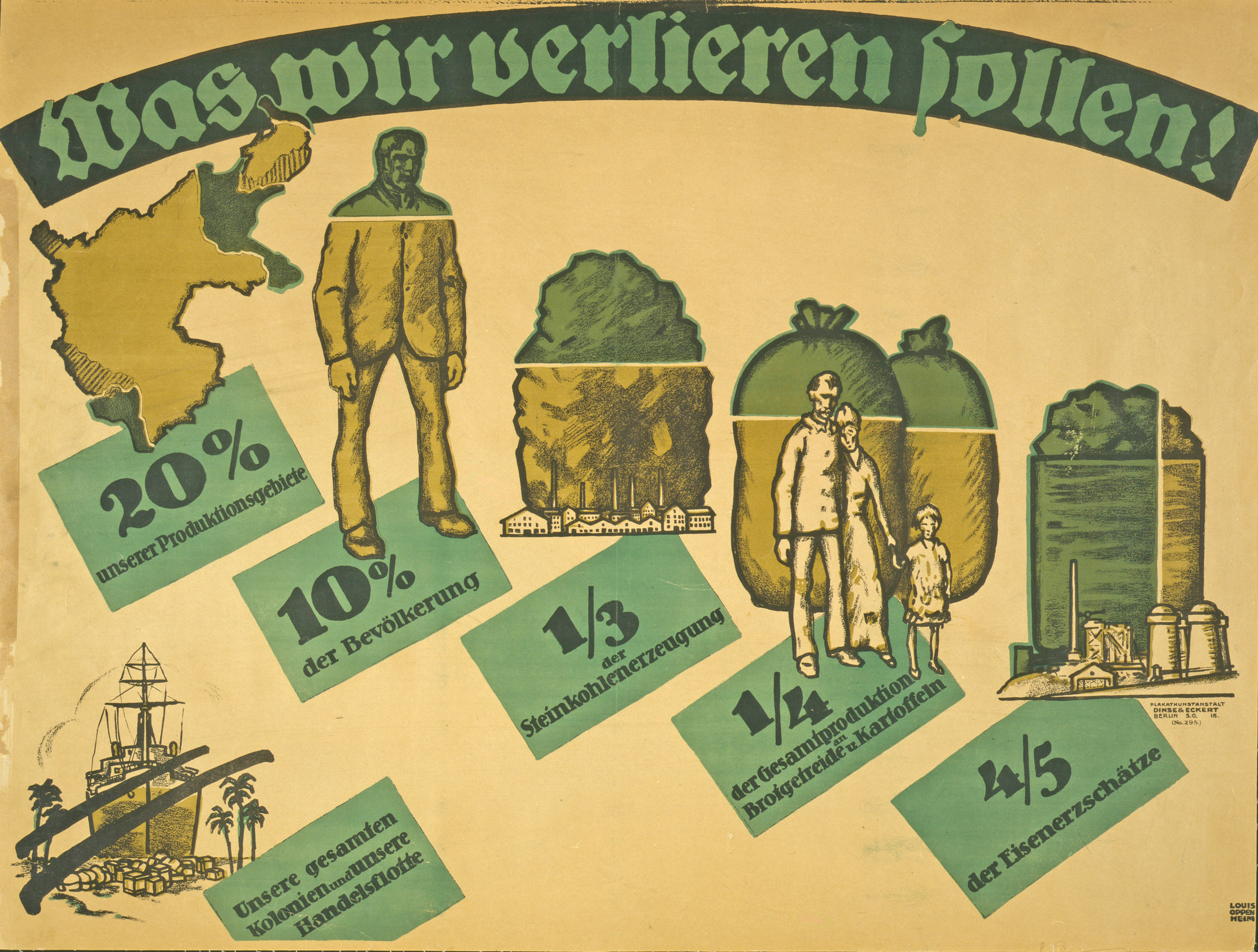
A German World War I poster entitled "Was wir Verlieren sollen!", or "What we will lose!", with grievances over what Germany would lose in 1919: at top left, the loss of territory to Poland and 10% of its population, indicating it was chief concern for Germany

In 1918 various proposals emerged defining the division of Upper Silesia. At the Paris Peace Conference a commission for Polish affairs was created to prepare proposals for Polish borders. In their first two proposals (of 27 March 1919 and of 7 May 1919) most of the future province was ceded, together with the region of Oppeln, to Poland. Yet that was not accepted by the Big Four, and following David Lloyd George's suggestion, the Upper Silesia plebiscite was organized. Before it took place on 20 March 1921, two Silesian Insurrections instigated by Polish inhabitants of the area were organized. After the referendum, in which Poland had 41% of the votes, a plan of division was created that divided Upper Silesia. Following this, the Third Silesian Uprising took place. A new plan of division was prepared by an ambassadors commission in Geneva in 1922, but it still created a situation in which some rural territories that voted mostly for Poland were granted to Germany and some urban territories with a German majority were granted to Poland. The Polish Sejm decided that the easternmost Upper Silesian areas should become an autonomous area within Poland organised as the Silesian Voivodeship and with Silesian Parliament as a constituency and Silesian Voivodeship Council as the executive body. A central political figure was Wojciech Korfanty. The part of Silesia awarded to Poland was by far the best-developed and richest region of the newly formed state, producing most of Poland's industrial output. Consequently, to the division in 1922, the German-Polish Accord on East Silesia (Geneva Convention) was concluded on 15 May 1922 which dealt with the constitutional and legal future of Upper Silesia as it has partly become Polish territory. After the division of Upper Silesia, the Polish minority in the German part of Upper Silesia was discriminated and persecuted.

The major part of Silesia remaining in Germany, was reorganised into the two provinces of Upper Silesia and Lower Silesia. After the Nazis' rise to power, the synagogues in modern-day Wrocław (German: Breslau) and in many other cities were destroyed during Kristallnacht of 1938. In October 1938, Trans-Olza (part of Cieszyn Silesia, the disputed area west of the Olza River: 876 km^{2} or 338 sq mi with 258,000 inhabitants), was taken by Poland from Czechoslovakia following the Munich Agreement that surrendered border areas of Czechoslovakia to Nazi Germany. Czech Silesia with Slezská Ostrava was incorporated into the Sudetenland Gau, while Hultschin was incorporated into Upper Silesia province.

=== World War II ===
With the invasion of Poland, Nazi Germany conquered the mostly Polish parts of Upper Silesia. Additional lands seized in 1939 were Sosnowiec (Sosnowitz), Będzin (Bendzin, Bendsburg), Chrzanów (Krenau), and Zawiercie (Warthenau) counties and parts of Olkusz (Ilkenau) and Żywiec (Saybusch) counties. In late 1940 some 18–20,000 Poles were expelled from Żywiec during Action Saybusch. In total, between 1940 and 1944, around 50,000 Poles were forcibly removed from the area and replaced with German settlers from Eastern Galicia and Volhynia. The transfer was agreed upon at the Gestapo–NKVD Conferences. Also, 23 camps called Polenlager were established across Silesia for the expelled Poles. The German populations in Silesia frequently welcomed the Wehrmacht and many thousands of Silesians were subsequently conscripted to the Wehrmacht.

In 1940, the Germany's Nazi government started to construct the Auschwitz and Groß-Rosen concentration camps. The latter camp provided labour for the construction of seven underground military facilities in the Owl Mountains and Książ Castle. Code-named Project Riese, work started in 1943 but was unfinished by the time Russian and Polish forces captured the area in 1945. An estimated 5,000 slave labourers died during the construction. Following Allied bombing of Silesian refineries and plants such as Blechhammer and Monowitz during the Oil Campaign of World War II, the "synthetic plants and crude oil refineries [were neutralized] by the advance of the Russian armies" c. February 20, 1945. In the January 1945 in Silesia the SS began marching approximately 56,000 prisoners in the Death marches out of the Auschwitz camps northwest to Gliwice and mostly west to Loslau (Polish: Wodzisław Śląski).

Silesia hosted prisoner-of-war camps, most famously Stalag Luft III whose prisoner escapes were immortalised in the films The Great Escape (1963) and The Wooden Horse (1950).

== Poland, Czech Republic and Germany ==
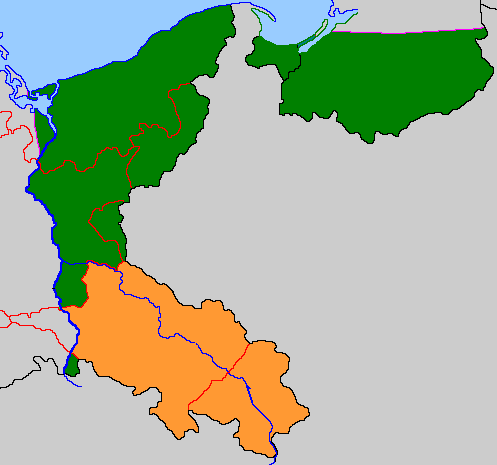
1945 – most of the pre-war German Silesia was transferred to Poland (area in orange, other areas transferred to Poland shown in green).

=== Polish area ===
In 1945, Silesia was captured by the Soviet Red Army. By then a large portion of the German population had fled or were evacuated from Silesia fearing the Soviets, but contrary to Soviet claims, millions of German Silesians remained in their home. A month before the Potsdam Conference, expulsions of Germans in western Silesia began with the aim to create a zone east of the Oder-Neisse line to convince the Western Allies that no Germans remained farther east. Under the terms of the agreements at the Yalta Conference and the Potsdam Agreement, both in 1945, German Silesia east of the rivers Oder and Lusatian Neisse was transferred to Poland (see Oder-Neisse line), pending a final peace conference with Germany. Since a peace conference never took place, the bulk of Silesia was effectively ceded by Germany. Most of the remaining German population was expelled.

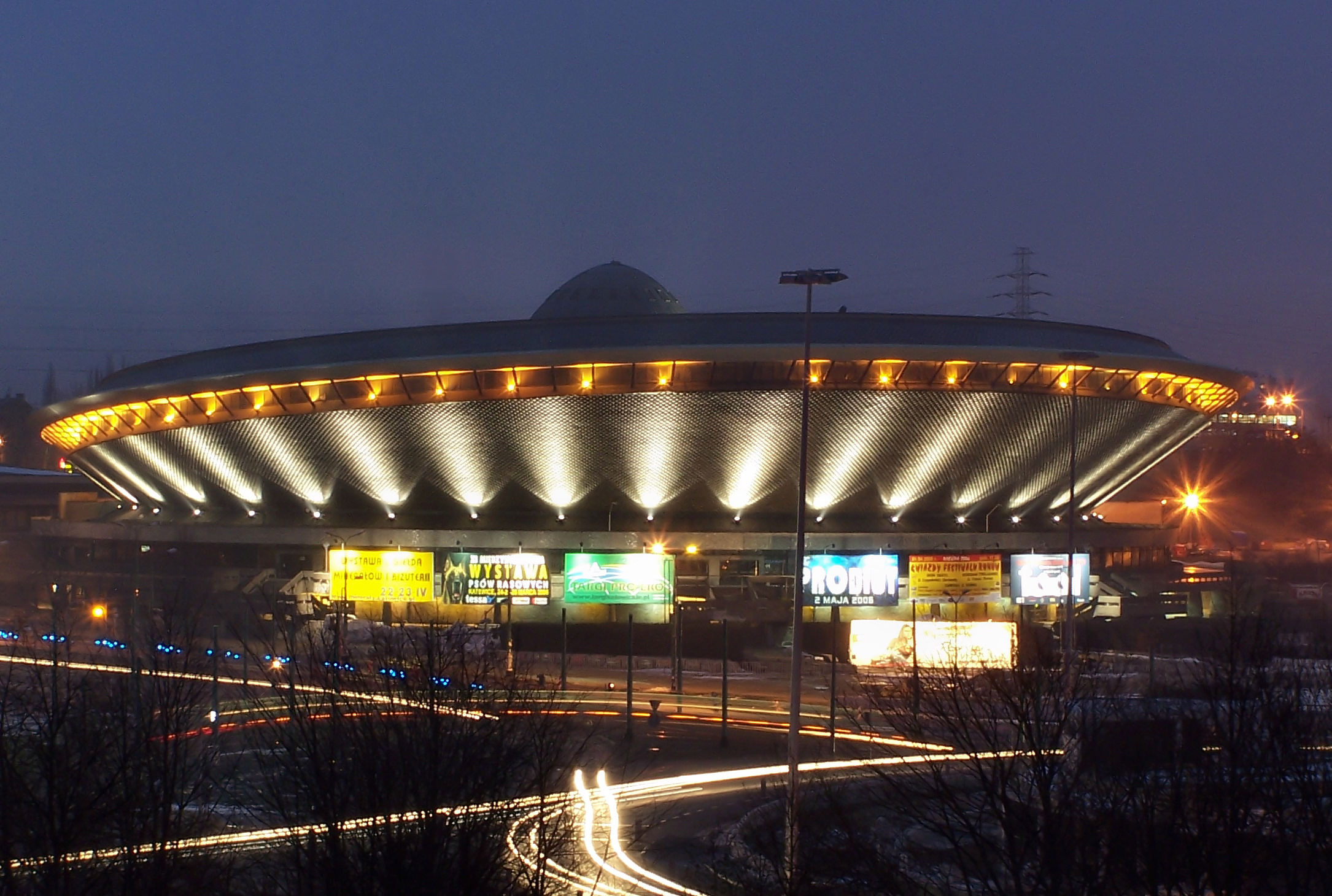
Katowice, Spodek

Before the war the Silesian German population amounted to more than four million inhabitants. Many died in the war or fled before the oncoming front. Most of the remainder were forcibly expelled after the conflict and some were imprisoned, e.g. in Lambsdorf (Łambinowice) and Zgoda labour camp. Many perished there and many more during the flight towards the Soviet Occupation Zone across the Oder and Neisse Rivers. Refugees first arrived in what would become East Germany and some victims of the Dresden firebombing were Silesian refugees. Some stayed in the Russian zone while others left for the Western Allies Occupation Zones or what would become West Germany. Silesians immigrated also to Austria, the United States, South America and Australia. More than 30,000 Silesian men (the majority of which had German roots, some having partially Polish roots) were deported to Soviet mines and Siberia, most of whom never returned. Other Germans Silesians emigrated or were driven out after the war by the Polish government who adopted a nationalistic anti-German policy in what they deemed the Recovered Territories, (see Flight and expulsion of Germans (1944–1950) and Emigration from Poland to Germany after World War II).

Silesian-Dąbrowa Voivodeship from 1946 to 1950

In 1946 territories were incorporated into existing Voivodeships or divided into new ones. In Upper Silesia a Silesian-Dąbrowa Voivodeship was established roughly comprising the pre-war Polish Silesian Voivodeship and the Zagłębie Dąbrowskie in the east and of the region of Opole in the west. This Voivodship was divided in 1950 creating distinct Katowice and Opole Voivodeships. The rest of the region was divided between Wrocław Voivodeship and Poznań Voivodeship. In 1950 the Lower Silesian districts of Brzeg and Namysłów from Wrocław Voivodeship were added to the newly formed Opole Voivodeship while the westmost region of Poznań Voivodeship was separated from its main part and formed the Zielona Góra Voivodeship. Because many places did not have agreed Polish names in 1945, a Commission for the Determination of Place Names was formed to find proper Polish names to replace the German names. In many cases the Slavic root of the German name was restituted, in some cases a literal translation of the German name was agreed upon, and in cases where an original Slavic name could not be determined, names were taken the new settlers' former native area. German

Because the German population of Czechoslovakia was also expelled, the border of Lower Silesia with Czechoslovakia now formed a linguistic border between the Polish and the Czech languages where before, German had been spoken on both sides of this border.

Over 1 million Silesians who considered themselves Poles or were accepted by the authorities due to their language and customs were allowed to stay after a special verification process that involved declaring Polish nationality and swearing allegiance to the Polish nation.

Silesian industry, particularly in Upper Silesia, suffered comparatively little damage due to its relative inaccessibility to Allied bombing, a Soviet Army enveloping maneuver in January 1945, and perhaps Albert Speer's reluctance or refusal to implement the scorched earth policy. This generally intact industry played a critical role in Polish reconstruction and industrialization. Industry that was damaged or destroyed (mostly in Opole and Lower Silesia) was rebuilt after the war. The major businesses were nationalized. Under the terms of the nationalisation statute of 1946 all German (not including Silesians who declared themselves Poles) property was confiscated without compensation. Large businesses owned by Polish-Silesians were confiscated as well, with compensation. Afterwards they were operated by the state, with relatively minor changes or investments, till 1989. At the fall of communism in 1989, the most industrialized parts of Silesia were in decline. Beginning in 1989, Silesia transitioned to a more diverse, service-based economy.

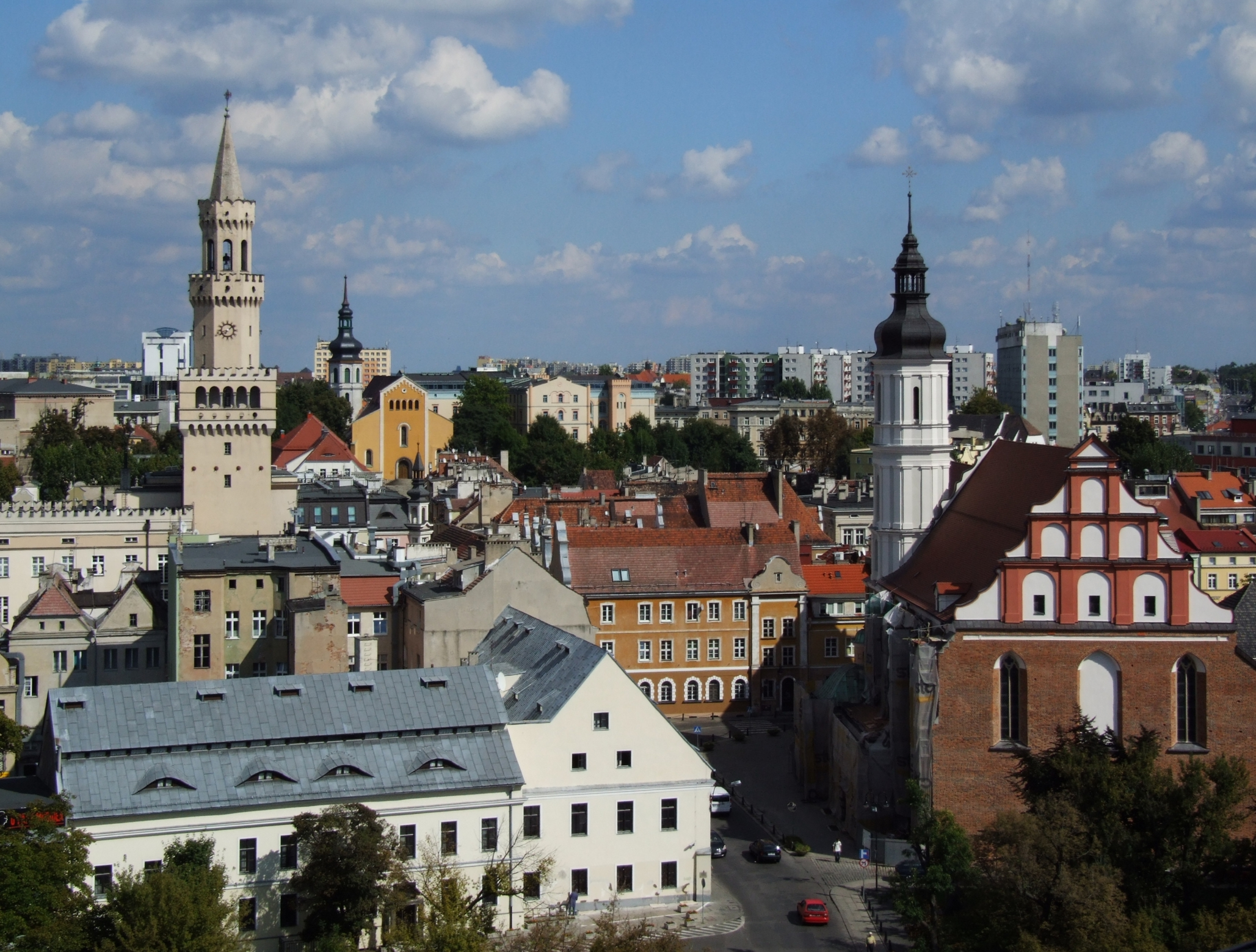
Renovated city centre of Opole seen from the Piast tower

The formerly German area was substantially repopulated by Poles, many of whom had been expelled from eastern Polish areas annexed by the Soviet Union (see Polish population transfers (1944–1946)) and transferred from Ukraine, Lithuania and Belarus. However, those who declared themselves Poles today form a small German-speaking population in the region around Opole (Oppeln), as well as some Slavic speaking and bilingual population of Upper Silesia who either consider themselves Poles or Silesian. The German-Polish Silesian minority is active in politics and has pressed for the right to again freely use the German language in public which has been largely successful.

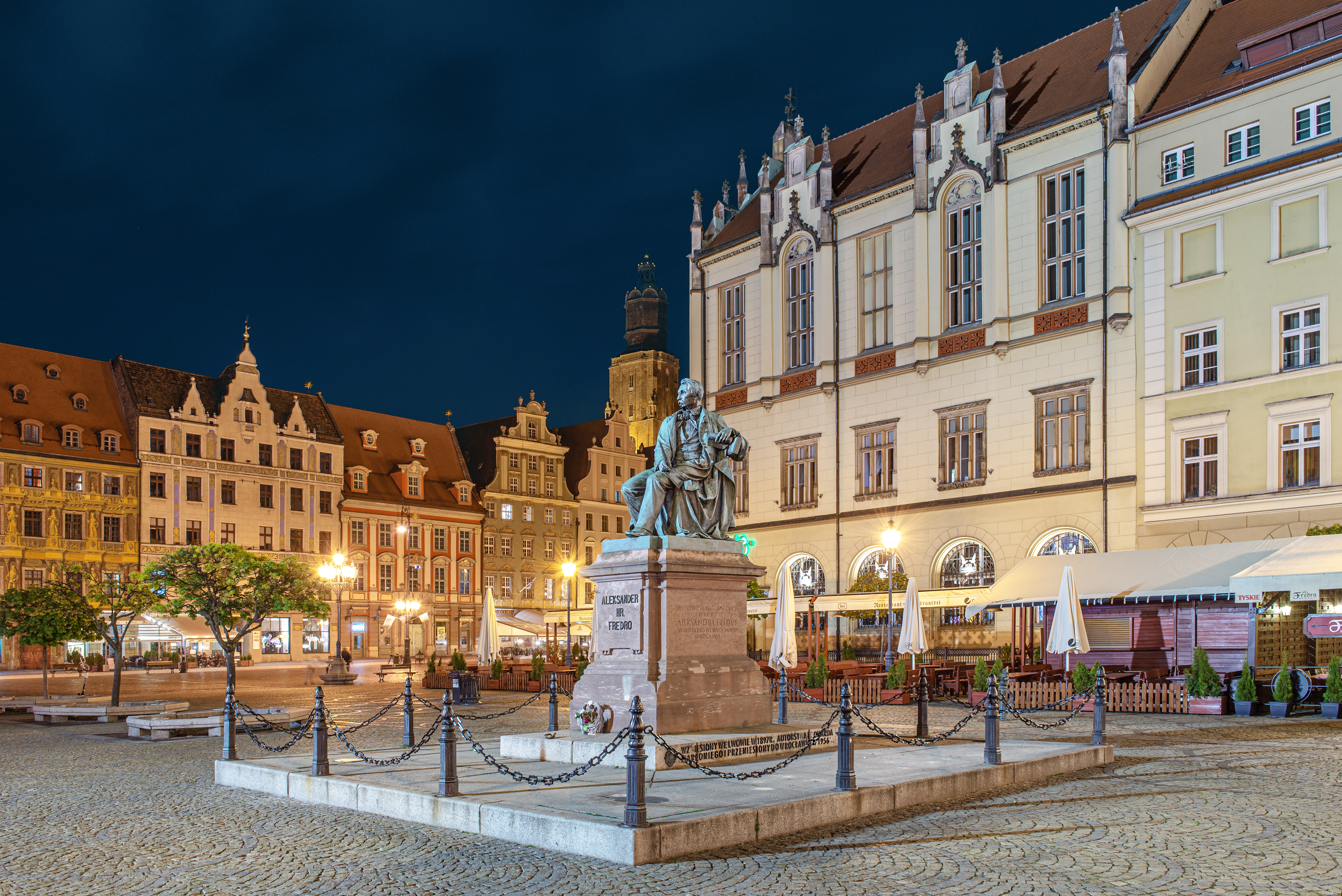
Aleksander Fredro monument in Wrocław's town square

In 1975 a new administrative division of Poland was introduced. The 17 former Voivodeships were divided into 49. In the south of the country 9 Voivodeships completely or partly lay within the historical borders of the Silesia region: Zielona Góra, Jelenia Góra, Legnica, Wałbrzych, Wrocław, Opole, Katowice, Bielsko-Biała and Częstochowa.

The autonomy of the former Silesian Voivodeship was not reestablished. The region was treated equally with other Polish regions, which was criticized by some inhabitants. After liberation, the Polish parliament did not offer autonomy to Polish Silesia. Since 1991, the Silesian Autonomy Movement has unsuccessfully lobbied the parliament for autonomy. The group reached 10.4% of votes in the Bieruń–Lędziny county in the 2006 local elections.

Since 1998 the Polish area has been divided between the Lubusz, Lower Silesian, Opole and Silesian Voivodeships.

=== German area ===
Post-war, part of the historical region of Lusatia that for over a century formed the most westward part of the Prussian Province of Lower Silesia remained in Germany. Some inhabitants consider themselves Silesian and cultivate Silesian customs. They retain the right to use the Lower Silesian flag and coat of arms as guaranteed by the Saxon Constitution of 1992. The Evangelical Church of Silesian Upper Lusatia meanwhile merged with churches in Berlin and Brandenburg to form the Evangelical Church of Berlin-Brandenburg-Silesian Upper Lusatia.

=== Czech area ===
Before the war Czech Silesia was settled by large German and Polish-speaking populations. Following the Second World War, Czech Silesia (including Hlučínsko) returned to Czechoslovakia and the ethnic Germans were expelled. The Polish minority however still exists, especially in the Trans-Olza region, where it amounts to 40,000 people.

== Literature ==
- Jaworski, Krzysztof (2014). "Christian Great Moravia and Silesian lands at the turn of the 9th and 10th centuries". The Cyril and Methodius Mission and Europe: 1150 Years Since the Arrival of the Thessaloniki Brothers in Great Moravia. pp. 172–181. ISBN 978-80-86023-51-9. OS LG 2023-08-18.
- Przemysław Wiszewski et al. 2015. Cuius regio? Ideological and Territorial Cohesion of the Historical Region of Silesia (c. 1000-2000) vol. 5., Permanent Change: The New Region(s) of Silesia 1945-2015. Wrocław: eBooki.com.pl ISBN 978-83-942651-2-0
- Tomasz Kamusella. 1999. The Dynamics of the Policies of Ethnic Cleansing in Silesia in the Nineteenth and Twentieth Centuries. Budapest: Open Society Institute
- Měřínský, Zdeněk (2014). "Paganism and the origins of Christianity in Moravia and Silesia". The Cyril and Methodius Mission and Europe: 1150 Years Since the Arrival of the Thessaloniki Brothers in Great Moravia. pp. 48–67. ISBN 978-80-86023-51-9. OS LG 2023-08-18.
- Joseph Partsch. 1896. Schlesien: eine Landeskunde für das deutsche Volk. T. 1., Das ganze Land (die Sprachgrenze 1790 und 1890; pp. 364–367). Breslau: Verlag Ferdinand Hirt. (in German)
- Joseph Partsch. 1911. Schlesien: eine Landeskunde für das deutsche Volk. T. 2., Landschaften und Siedelungen. Breslau: Verlag Ferdinand Hirt. (in German)
- Paul Weber. 1913. Die Polen in Oberschlesien: eine statistische Untersuchung. Verlagsbuchhandlung von Julius Springer in Berlin (in German)
- Robert Semple. London 1814. Observations made on a tour from Hamburg through Berlin, Gorlitz, and Breslau, to Silberberg; and thence to Gottenburg (pp. 122–123)

=== By Lucyna Harc et al. ===
- Lucyna Harc et al. 2013. Cuius Regio? Ideological and Territorial Cohesion of the Historical Region of Silesia (c. 1000-2000) vol. 1., The Long Formation of the Region Silesia (c. 1000-1526). Wrocław: eBooki.com.pl ISBN 978-83-927132-1-0
- Lucyna Harc et al. 2014. Cuius regio? Ideological and Territorial Cohesion of the Historical Region of Silesia (c. 1000-2000) vol. 2., The Strengthening of Silesian Regionalism (1526–1740). Wrocław: eBooki.com.pl ISBN 978-83-927132-6-5
- Lucyna Harc et al. 2014. Cuius regio? Ideological and Territorial Cohesion of the Historical Region of Silesia (c. 1000-2000) vol. 4., Region Divided: Times of Nation-States (1918-1945). Wrocław: eBooki.com.pl ISBN 978-83-927132-8-9
