= Battle of Gdańsk (1272) =

- Part of the civil war in Pomerelia
Date	January 1272
Location	Gdańsk
Result	Victory of the duchies of Pomerelia and Greater Poland

Belligerents
Duchy of Pomerelia; Duchy of Greater Poland	Margraviate of Brandenburg

Commanders and leaders
Mestwin II; Bolesław the Pious	Unknown

Casualties and losses
Unknown	Heavy

The Battle of Gdańsk took place in January 1272, during the civil war in Pomerelia, in the city of Gdańsk occupied by the Margraviate of Brandenburg. The battle was fought between forces of the Margraviate of Brandenburg fortified in the city, against the attacking forced of the Duchy of Pomerelia led by Mestwin II, and the Duchy of Greater Poland led by Bolesław the Pious. The battle ended in the decisive victory of Mestwin II and Bolesław's forces, and the retreat of Brandenburgian forces from Pomerelia.

== Background ==
On 10 January 1266, Swietopelk II, the ruler of the Duchy of Gdańsk had died. Following his death, his state had been participated between his sons, Wartislaw II of Gdańsk, and Mestwin II. The exact boundaries of the partition remain unknown, due to the lack of necessary historical records. It is known that Wartislaw was given the city of Gdańsk, with the surrounding area. Mestwin II, ruler of the Duchy of Świecie, wasn't satisfied with the partition, being in the belief that, as the oldest heir, he hold the right to Gdańsk, the most prestigious city in Pomerelia, and the capital of his father's state. As such, he started planning on gaining control over that area. On 1 April 1269, he met in Choszczno, with John II, Otto IV, and Conrad I of Brandenburg, the margraves of Brandenburg, from the House of Ascania, from Stendal. During the meeting, he paid homage to them, giving them his lands, which then, were given back to him, making him, their vassal. The exception was the area of Białogarda, which was then incorporated into the Margraviate of Brandenburg. Additionally, somewhen, between 1969 and 1971, Mestwin, promised to give Gdańsk to the margraves, in the exchange in help in the war against his brother. The civil war in Pomerelia had begun in 1269, and by 1270, Mestwin conquered the duchies of Gdańsk and Lubiszewo and Tczew, forming the Duchy of Pomerelia.

In 1271, Mestwin II, together with Bolesław the Pious, the ruler of the Duchy of Greater Poland, had launched an invasion on the Duchy of Inowrocław. During the invasion, Mestwin's forced had attacked and captured Wyszogród. While Mestwin's army remained there, the military forces of the Margraviate of Brandenburg, had arrived in the Pomerelia. Though, officially claiming to arrive as the military aid to Mestwin, they had captured his territories, including the towns of Gdańsk and Tczew, with the help of the local German-speaking population, who had capitulated the towns to them. In November and December 1271, Mestwin had unsuccessfully attempted to reconquer lost territories. Owing to small army to fight off the invaders alone, at the end of the year, following his advisors, he had requested military help from Bolesław the Pious, who had immediately set off to help, without time-consuming preparations, leading a smaller army of forces that were available in Inowrocław.

== Battle ==
In January 1272, they combined forces had begun the attack on Gdańsk. They had set fire around the city, and stormed into it with soldiers. They had captured city, forcing the Brandenburgian army to retreat from Mestwin's territories. During the battle, all Brandenburgian soldiers were killed, with the exception to those who managed to hid in a fortifications tower.

== Aftermath ==
Following the capture of the city, the people who conspired with Brandenburg were put in front of the court, made out of Mestwin II and the local nobility. They were accused of treason, and many of them were exiled, executed and had their land property confiscated. The city itself was deprived of its fortifications, and its economical and political status was severely weakened for the following years. Many former subjects of Sambor II who also conspired with Brandenburg had their land property confiscated.

On 3 September 1273, Mestwin II had met with John II, Otto IV, and Conrad I of Brandenburg, the margraves of Brandenburg, to negotiate. In the signed agreement had agreed to give the Lands of Schlawe and Stolp to them as a fiefdom and ruling it as their vassal. He had also agreed to give them his military aid in the case of a war, including against his ally, Bolesław the Pious.

== Citations ==
=== Bibliography ===
- Błażej Śliwiński: Sambor II.
- Bronisław Nowacki: Przemysł II.
- Jacek Osiński: Bolesław Rogatka.
- Błażej Śliwiński: Ziemomysł inowrocławski.
- Marcin Hlebionek: Bolesław Pobożny.
