= Euphrosyne (disambiguation) =

Euphrosyne usually refers to a Greek goddess, and is a Greek female name; Phroso or Froso is its more common derivative.

Euphrosyne may also refer to:

== People ==
=== Saints ===
- Euphrosyne of Alexandria (fl. 5th century), early Christian monastic and saint
- Euphrosyne of Polotsk (1110–1173), Belarusian Orthodox nun and saint
- Euphrosyne of Moscow (died 1407), Grand Duchess of Muscovy and Russian Orthodox saint
- Euphrosyne of Serbia (c. 1335–1405), also known as Princess Milica; Queen Regent of Serbia, Serbian Orthodox abbess and saint

=== Royalty ===
- Euphrosyne Angelina (died 1253 or 1288), daughter of Byzantine emperor Isaac II Angelus
- Euphrosyne Kastamonitissa, 12th-century Byzantine noblewoman
- Euphrosyne Palaiologina (daughter of Michael VIII), illegitimate daughter of Emperor Michael VIII Palaiologos and wife to Mongol general Nogai Khan
- Euphrosyne (daughter of Mieszko IV Tanglefoot), 13th-century Polish princess
- Euphrosyne of Greater Poland (1247/50–1298), Polish princess
- Euphrosyne of Masovia (1292–1328/1329), Polish duchess
- Maria Euphrosyne of Zweibrücken (1625–1687), Swedish countess palatine
- Euphrosyne Yaroslavna, 12th-century Slavic princess

==== Royal partners and concubines ====
- Euphrosyne (9th century) (c. 790–after 836), Byzantine Empress
- Euphrosyne of Opole (died 1292), wife of Casimir I of Kuyavia, and later of Mestwin II, Duke of Pomerania
- Euphrosyne Doukaina Kamatera (1155–1211), Byzantine empress
- Euphrosyne of Kiev (c. 1130 – c. 1193), wife of king Géza II of Hungary
- Euphrosyne of Bulgaria (died before 1308), first wife of tzar Theodore Svetoslav of Bulgaria
- Afrosinya (1700–1748), mistress of the son of Peter the Great of Russia

=== Artists ===
- Euphrosyne Doxiadis (born 1946), Greek art historian
- Euphrosyne Löf (1772–1828), Swedish actor
- Eufrosyne Abrahamson (1836–1869), Swedish soprano
- Euphrosyne Parepa-Rosa (1836–1874), Scottish soprano
- Julia Nyberg (1784–1854), Swedish poet who used the pen name of "Euphrosyne"

=== Politicians ===
- Eufrosina Cruz (born 1979), Mexican activist and politician

== Other uses ==
- 31 Euphrosyne, one of the largest main belt asteroids
- Boloria euphrosyne, the pearl-bordered fritillary butterfly
- Euphrosyne (plant), a genus of flowering plants
- Euphrosine, 1790 opera by Étienne Méhul
- Euphrosine (annelid), a genus of Polychaete marine worms (with alternative spellings in literature)

== See also ==
- Eufrozyna
- Euphrosynos
