= Battle of Danzig =

Battles near or Sieges of Danzig (Gdańsk) took place several times in the history of Danzig. The most notable are:

- Battle of Gdańsk (1272) during the civil war in Pomerelia
- Teutonic takeover of Danzig (Gdańsk) in 1308. This event involved several parties
- Siege of Danzig (1577) by king Stefan Batory, following the Danzig rebellion. Inconclusive, lifted as a compromise was negotiated
- Siege of Danzig (1626–1629) – one or more unsuccessful Swedish sieges during that period
- Battle of Oliva 1627: naval battle in the vicinity of Oliwa (currently part of Gdańsk)
- Siege of Danzig (1655–1660): Unsuccessful siege by Swedish forces in the Deluge
- Siege of Danzig (1734): Russians capture the city during the War of the Polish Succession
- Siege of Danzig (1807): French capture the city from Prussians during the War of the Fourth Coalition
- Siege of Danzig (1813): Russian forces against French Army.
- Events starting on 1 September 1939
  - Defense of the Polish Post Office in Danzig
  - Battle of Westerplatte – German battleship vs. the Polish fortified ammunition depot
  - Battle of the Danzig Bay – German aircraft against Polish vessels
- Siege of Danzig (1945): Soviet forces take the city of Danzig at the end of World War II
