= Euphrosyne (daughter of Mieszko IV Tanglefoot) =

Princess of Racibórz, Opole and Kraków, c. 1200 CE

- Princess of Racibórz and Opole, probably Lady of Kraków
- Born: at the latest at the end of the 12th century
- Died: May 23 or 25, at the earliest with the beginning of the 13th century
- Husband: probably one of the von Woldenberg counts
- Dynasty: Piast dynasty
- Father: Mieszko IV Tanglefoot
- Mother: Ludmila

Euphrosyne (born no later than the end of the 12th century, died on May 23 or 25, earliest in the beginning of the 13th century) was a princess of Racibórz and Opole, and probably also of Kraków between 1210 and 1211, the daughter of Duke Mieszko IV Tanglefoot and Ludmila (most likely from the Přemyslid dynasty).

== Early life ==
=== Origins ===
Euphrosyne's father was Duke Mieszko IV Tanglefoot. Presumably, between 1170 and 1180, he married Ludmila, who probably hailed from the Přemyslid dynasty. Researchers most commonly identify her as the daughter of either Otto III Detleb, the Duke of Olomouc, and Durancia, or the son of the aforementioned couple, Włodzimierz, and his (unnamed) spouse. There have also been isolated theories suggesting that Euphrosyne's mother was the daughter of the Bohemian Duke Soběslav I and the Croatian Princess Adelaide, or the child of one of Soběslav's brothers. From the marriage of Mieszko and Ludmila, most likely, five children were born: Kazimierz, Ludmiła, Agnieszka, Euphrosyne, and Ryksa.

Euphrosyne was born no later than the end of the 12th century. She was the first representative of the Piast dynasty to bear this name. The reason for bestowing this name upon Mieszko Tanglefoot's daughter remains unclear. It is speculated that this name may have appeared in the Piast dynasty through Euphrosyne's maternal grandmother, who probably hailed from the Rurik dynasty. If that grandmother was Durancia, then Euphrosyne's name would allude to Durancia's presumed sister, Euphrosyne of Kiev (the wife of the Hungarian King Géza II). After her, the name was given to her niece, the daughter of Casimir I of Opole, the Duchess of Kujawy.

=== Associations with the monastery in Rybnik ===
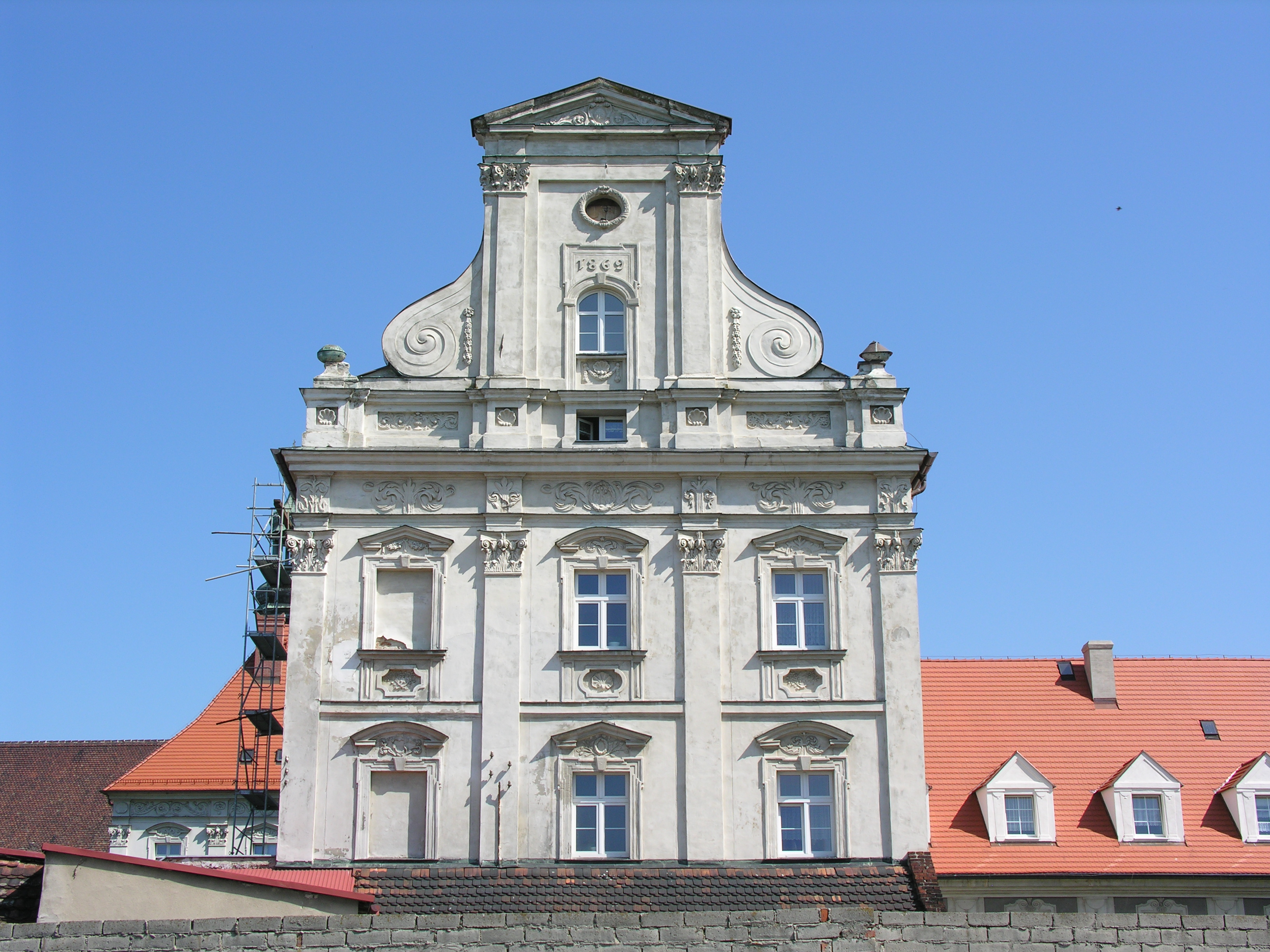
Monastery in Czarnowąsy, founded by the family of Euphrosyne

The only information about the daughters of Mieszko and Ludmila is found in Nekrolog czarnowąski. Under the dates of January 14, May 9, and May 25, the deaths of three ducal daughters are recorded: Ludmila, Agnieszka, and Euphrosyne, respectively. The source names Ludmila and Agnieszka as heiresses of the convent founded at the initiative of Duchess Ludmila between 1203 and 1207 in Rybnik near Racibórz, later transferred to Czarnowąsy. Nekrolog Czarnowąski does not list Euphrosyne as an heiress of the convent, recording only under May 25: Euphrosina ducissa Mesconis filia (Latin). It is suspected that the princess was not closely associated with the Premonstratensians and, being an adult at the time, resided away from the convent in Rybnik.

=== Possible marriage in Germany ===
According to some researchers, Euphrosyne died as a German countess. The basis for this assumption is an entry in the female necrology of the Augustinian convent in Derneburg, currently located in the municipality of Holle in Lower Saxony, placed under the date of May 23: (E)uffrosina polonika et cometissa obiit coma [?] (Latin).

This entry was first interpreted in relation to Euphrosyne by 19th-century German historiography. Initially, Polish historiography approached this identification skeptically. However, currently, Polish literature also identifies both Euphrosynes. Researchers point out the coincidence of names, dates of death, and the origin of both women. Probably, the princess became the wife of one of the Saxon counts. At that time, the greatest benefactors of the Derneburg monastery were the counts of Wöltingerode and Woldenberg. However, the first of these families had its own monastery in Wöltingerode, so it is assumed that Euphrosyne's husband was a count from Woldenberg.

According to historians, Euphrosyne from Opole died on May 23 or 25 in an unknown year in the 13th century.

== Bibliography ==
- Dąbrowski, Dariusz (2008). Genealogia Mścisławowiczów. Pierwsze pokolenia (do początku XIV wieku). Kraków: Avalon. ISBN 978-83-60448-55-7.
- Dmochowski, P. A.; Sikorski, A. (2007). Górzyński, S. (ed.). "Piastowie górnośląscy". Rocznik Polskiego Towarzystwa Heraldycznego. IX (XX). Bytom: DiG. ISSN 1230-803X.
- Grotefend, Hermann (1889). Stammtafeln der schlesischen Fürsten bis zum Jahre 1740. Wrocław: Josef Max & Comp.
- Horwat, J. (1995). "Mieszko Plątonogi, książę raciborski, opolski oraz krakowski 1131–1211". In Bukowski, W.; Ożóg, Krzysztof; Sikora, F.; Szczur, Stanisław (eds.). Cracovia–Polonia–Europa. Studia z dziejów średniowiecza ofiarowane Jerzemu Wyrozumskiemu w sześćdziesiątą piątą rocznicę urodzin i czterdziestolecie pracy naukowej. Kraków: Secesja. ISBN 83-86077-67-0.
- Horwat, J. (2007). "Piastowie górnośląscy". Rocznik Muzeum Górnośląskiego w Bytomiu (8). Bytom: Historia. ISSN 0068-4651.
- Jasiński, Kazimierz (2007). Rodowód Piastów śląskich. Vol. II. Kraków: Avalon. ISBN 978-83-60448-28-1.
- Mika, Norbert (2006). Mieszko syn Władysława II Wygnańca, książę raciborski i pan Krakowa – dzielnicowy władca Polski. Racibórz: WAW. ISBN 83-89802-21-X.
- Rajman, Jerzy (1999). "Eufrozyna". In Ożóg, Krzysztof; Szczur, Stanisław (eds.). Piastowie. Leksykon biograficzny. Kraków: Wydawnictwo Literackie. ISBN 83-08-02829-2.
- Śliwiński, B. (2007). Rajman, J. (ed.). "Okoliczności fundacji klasztoru norbertanek w Stołpie-Żukowie pod Gdańskiem". Annales Academiae Paedagogicae Cracoviensis 40, Studia Historica 5. Kraków: Wydawnictwo Naukowe Akademii Pedagogicznej. ISSN 1643-6547.
