= Eufrozyna =

Eufrozyna is a feminine given name, the Polish language variant of the name Euphrosyne.

It may refer to:

- Euphrosyne of Greater Poland (1247/50 – 1298), a Greater Poland princess, member of the House of Piast and Abbess of St. Clara in Trzebnica
- Euphrosyne of Masovia (1292 – 1328/1329), Duchess of Oświęcim by marriage
- Euphrosyne of Opole (1228/30 – 1292), a daughter of Casimir I of Opole and his wife Viola, Duchess of Opole
