= Ludmila (wife of Mieszko I Tanglefoot) =

High Duchess consort of Poland
- Tenure: 1210?
- Died: 20 October, after 1210
- Spouse: Mieszko IV Tanglefoot
- Issue: Casimir I of Opole; Agnes; Ludmila; Euphrosyne; Ryksa?
- House: House of Piast

Ludmila (d. October 20 after 1210) was the wife of Mieszko IV Tanglefoot. Her origins are disputed.

Mieszko IV Tanglefoot married Ludmila between 1170-1178. Given her name, historians think that Ludmila came from Bohemia, a member of the Přemyslid dynasty, since this was one of the only families to have women in it called Ludmila. However researchers have different opinions. It was suggested that she was daughter of Otto III, Duke of Olomouc and his wife Durantia, probably the daughter of Mstislav I of Kiev by his second wife Liubava Dmitrievna. There was also a minority hypothesis that Ludmila was daughter of Soběslav I, Duke of Bohemia, Conrad II, Duke of Znojmo or Vladimir, Duke of Olomouc.

Ludmila contributed to the foundation of the Norbertine monastery in Rybnik, who was later transferred to Czarnowąsy.

Mieszko and Ludmila had the following children:

1. Casimir I (b. ca. 1179/80 - d. 13 May 1230).
2. Ludmilla (d. 24 January aft. 1200).
3. Agnes (d. 9 May aft. 1200).
4. Euphrosyne (d. 25 May aft. 1200).
5. Ryksa (d. aft. 24 September 1239).

Ludmila (wife of Mieszko I Tanglefoot) Died: c. 1210
Royal titles
| Preceded by Grzymislawa of Luck | High Duchess consort of Poland; 1210? | Succeeded by Grzymislawa of Luck |
