= Battle of Opole =

1241 battle of the first Mongol invasion of Poland

- Part of the Mongol invasion of Poland
Date	Early April 1241
Location	Opole, Poland
Result	Mongol victory

Belligerents
Mongol Empire	Poles (from the provinces of Silesia and Lesser Poland)

Commanders and leaders
Unknown	Władysław Opolski

Strength
Unknown	Unknown

Casualties and losses
Unknown	Unknown

The Battle of Opole took place in the Polish town of Opole, in early April 1241, during the Mongol invasion of Poland. It ended in the victory of the Mongol forces, who defeated knights from Opole Silesia and Lesser Poland, headed by Duke Wladyslaw Opolski.

In late March 1241, Mongol forces, which had previously been divided into two armies, reunited in the area of Kraków. On 1 April the invaders headed westwards, to the Polish province of Silesia. After a skirmish near Raciborz, the Mongols decided not to besiege well-fortified Raciborz. Instead, they followed the Oder towards Opole. There, they faced units from Lesser Poland (the provinces of Kraków and Sandomierz), reinforced with knights of Duke of Opole, Wladyslaw. Since the Poles were numerically inferior, they retreated after a short battle. The Mongols followed them towards Wrocław, and Legnica (see Battle of Legnica).

== Sources ==
- Piastowie. Leksykon biograficzny, wyd. 1999, str. 397
- Wielka Historia Polski cz. do 1320, wyd. Pinexx 1999, s. 187-188
- Stanislaw Krakowski, Polska w walce z najazdami tatarskimi w XIII wieku, wyd. MON 1956, str.136-137
