= Duchy of Poznan =

Duchy of Poznan may refer to:

- Duchy of Poznań, 12th–14th century
- Grand Duchy of Posen, 1815–1848
