= Wartislaw II of Gdańsk =

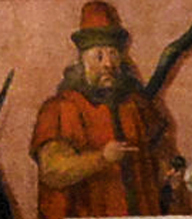
- Painting of Wartislaw II, from the 1598 Pedigree of the Pomeranian Dukes by Cornelius Krommeny.

Duke of Gdańsk
- Reign: 1266–1270
- Predecessor: Swietopelk II
- Successor: Mestwin II

Duke of Świecie
- Reign: 1269
- Predecessor: Mestwin II
- Successor: Mestwin II
- Born: c. 1237
- Died: 9 May 1271; Wyszogród, Duchy of Kuyavia (now Bydgoszcz, Poland)
- Burial: Inowrocław, Poland
- Dynasty: Samboride
- Father: Swietopelk II

Wartislaw II of Gdańsk (Note: Polish: Warcisław II gdański; Kashubian: Wartisłôw II Gduńsczi, Wartësłôw II Gduńsczi) (c. 1237 – 9 May 1271) was a duke from the Samboride dynasty. From 1266 to 1270, he was the duke of the Duchy of Gdańsk, and also, briefly in 1269, the duke of the Duchy of Świecie.

== Biography ==
Wartislaw II was born around 1237. He came from the Samboride dynasty, being the son of Swiantopolk II, duke of the Duchy of Gdańsk. He was a younger brother of Mestwin II, duke of the Duchy of Świecie.

His father died on 10 January 1266. Following his death, the Duchy of Gdańsk was participated between his sons, Wartislaw II, and Mestwin II. The exact boundaries of the partition remain unknown, due to the lack of precise historical records. It is known that Wartislaw was given the city of Gdańsk, with the surrounding area. In such partition he might have also become the ruler of the land of Białogarda, however it remains unknown who was the ruler of the area at the time. Until 1262, the area belonged to the Duchy of Białogarda, under the rule of Ratibor of Białogarda. 1268 marks the first year in which, Wartislaw II is named the ruler of Białogarda, in any existing documentation. It remains unknown which of the brothers received the Słupsk and Sławno Land in the partition.

Later, the Słupsk and Sławno Land were attacked, either in 1266 by Barnim I, duke of the Duchy of Pomerania, or in 1269, by Barnim I and Vitslav II, prince of the Principality of Rügen, which resulted, with Sławno being conquered.

Mestwin II wasn't satisfied with the partition, being in the belief that, as the oldest heir, he hold the right to Gdańsk, the most prestigious city in Pomerelia, and the capital of his father's state. As such, he started planning on gaining control over that area. On 1 April 1269, he met in Choszczno with John II, Otto IV, and Conrad, the margraves of Brandenburg, from the House of Ascania. During the meeting, he paid homage to them, giving them his lands, which then, were given back to him, making him, their vassal. The exception was the area of Białogarda, which was then incorporated into the Margraviate of Brandenburg. Additionally, sometime between 1269 and 1271, Mestwin, promised to give Gdańsk to the margraves.

The agreement angered the nobility and the knighthood of Świecie, which led to their rebellion against Mestwin, in the summer of 1269. They captured him, and imprisoned him in Raciąż. Following that, they offered the throne to Wartislaw II. However, soon after that, Mestwin was rescued by the knights loyal to him, and in the autumn of 1269, he began an attack on states of Wartislaw II, and Sambor II, duke of the Duchy of Lubiszewo. The exact origin of his army remains unknown, however, they could have been either the mercenaries from the State of the Teutonic Order, or the reinforcements sent from the Margraviate of Brandenburg. Most likely at the beginning of 1270, he conquered the Duchy of Lubiszewo, without major resistance, as Sambor II with his army were at the time in Kuyavia. Following that, his army captured Gdańsk, without major resistance from the defenders. After the fall of the city, Wartislaw II escaped to Elbląg in the State of the Teutonic Order, and later he and Sambor II found refuge in the Duchy of Kuyavia, in the royal court of duke Ziemomysł of Kuyavia. Wartislaw was given a fort in Wyszogród, where, he would organize the operation base for his future attack on Mestwin's territories. However, before realising any plans, he died in suspicious circumstances on 9 May 1271 in Wyszogród. He was buried in the Franciscan Church in Inowrocław.
