= Mieszko II the Fat =

13th-century Polish duke

- Duke of Opole-Racibórz, Kalisz-Wieluń
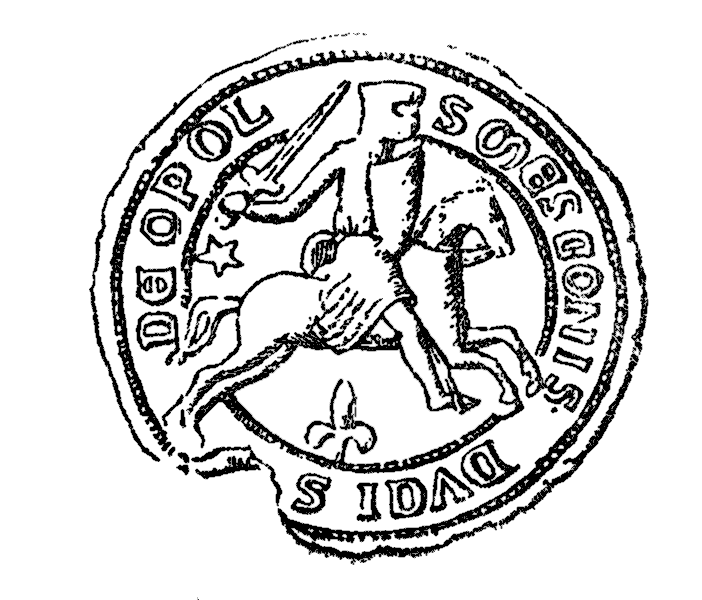
- Mieszko II the Fat's seal, dated to 1245.
- Born: 1220
- Died: 22 October 1246 (aged 25–26)
- Noble family: Silesian Piasts
- Father: Casimir I of Opole
- Mother: Viola of Bulgaria

Mieszko II the Fat (Polish: Mieszko II Otyły) (c. 1220 – 22 October 1246) was a Duke of Opole-Racibórz from 1230 until his death, and Duke of Kalisz-Wieluń during 1234–1239 (with his brother as co-ruler).

He was the eldest son of Duke Casimir I of Opole by his wife Viola, probably a Bulgarian princess.

== Early years ==
At the time of his father's death in 1230, Mieszko II and his younger brother Władysław were still minors; for this, the regency of the Duchy was taken by their mother and Henry I the Bearded, Duke of Wrocław. Following her late husband's politics, the Dowager Duchess Viola led a policy of close cooperation with the Church. In 1233, and probably with the consent of the Duke of Wrocław, was issued a bull by Pope Gregory IX, under which the tutelage of the young Dukes was removed from their mother and granted to the Archbishop of Gniezno and the Bishops of Wroclaw and Olomouc. A year later, to calm the erupted rebellion against this decision, Henry I the Bearded give Kalisz and Wieluń to Casimir I's sons, taking the full control over Opole-Racibórz, but without denying their hereditary rights.

== Beginning of reign ==
In 1238, Henry I the Bearded died and was succeeded by his son Henry II the Pious, who also assumed the regency over Opole-Racibórz. Shortly after, Mieszko II began to claim the government of their lands. It is unknown exactly when Mieszko II took over the rule over Opole-Racibórz, but this has been probably in late 1238 or early 1239 (who is more likely). One of the first politic decisions of Mieszko II was his marriage with Judith (b. 1222/25 – d. 4 December 1257/65?), daughter of Duke Konrad I of Masovia, who gave to the Duke of Opole-Racibórz greater autonomy in his rule. Mieszko II's mother Viola and brother Władysław are expected to remain in Kalisz, which held power under the guidance of the Duke of Wrocław.

== Battle and trickery ==
The calm government of Mieszko II was brutally interrupted by the Mongol invasion at the beginning of 1241. In contrast to Bolesław V the Chaste, Duke of Sandomierz, Mieszko II didn't have any intention to give up his principality at the mercy of the enemy, and stood facing them. Fortunately, the initial moves of the Duke of Opole-Racibórz were favorable and in March 1241 at the Battle of Raciborz Mieszko II managed to catch part of the Mongolian troops in the borders of the Odra River, giving to Henry II the Pious more time to organize the defense. On 9 April 1241 the Mongol and Christian forces clashed in the Battle of Legnica. There Mieszko II played an infamous part: he was tricked by the Mongols into retreating in the decisive moment of the battle. This is one of the main reasons of the total defeat of the Christian troops.

== Reign ==
Already in May 1241, Mieszko II began the reconstruction of the devastated territories by the Mongolian army. In 1241 Władysław, Mieszko II's younger brother, was declared an adult and able to govern; the Duchy of Opole-Racibórz escaped from the usual division, since Władysław was satisfied with the Duchy of Kalisz given to him by Henry II the Pious. Władysław's authority was soon threatened by the Dukes of Greater Poland, who wanted to retake this land. Further meetings between the brothers in order to find a way out of this difficulty (for example, on 25 March 1243 in Mechnicy near Koźle) didn't give positive results and in 1244, Władysław was forced to withdraw from Kalisz, maintaining only his rule over Wieluń, which ultimately also lost in 1249.

In 1243, Mieszko II military supported his father-in-law Konrad I of Masovia in his struggle for the throne of Kraków. The Masovia-Opole forces were defeat, in part because the mutual distrust between both rulers, despite the fact that Mieszko II brought further retaliatory expeditions against Bolesław V the Chaste. The cooperation has brought tangible benefits only three years later when he took the fortress of Lelów. Mieszko II's suddenly death, however, prevent the permanent union of this land to the Duchy of Opole-Racibórz.

Mieszko II tried, with little success, to continue his father's politics in the spread of settlements under German law. The Duke paid particular care to the Teutonic Order, who acquired in Upper Silesia, high-value properties.

== Death ==
Mieszko II, who — as reflected in his nickname — had not enjoyed good health, died at only twenty-six years of age, on 22 October 1246 without issue. In his will, he left all of his lands to his brother Władysław, except the district of Cieszyn, which was given to their mother Viola as her dower.

Mieszko II the Fat House of Piast Born: c. 1220 Died: 22 October 1246
Preceded by Casimir I	Duke of Opole-Racibórz; 1230–1246	Succeeded by Władysław
Preceded by Henry I the Bearded	Duke of Kalisz; 1234–1239; With: Władysław	Succeeded by Władysław
Preceded by Henry I the Bearded	Duke of Wieluń; 1234–1239; With: Władysław	Succeeded by Władysław
