= Casimir I of Opole =

Silesian duke of Opole and Racibórz

Casimir I
- Duke of Opole-Racibórz
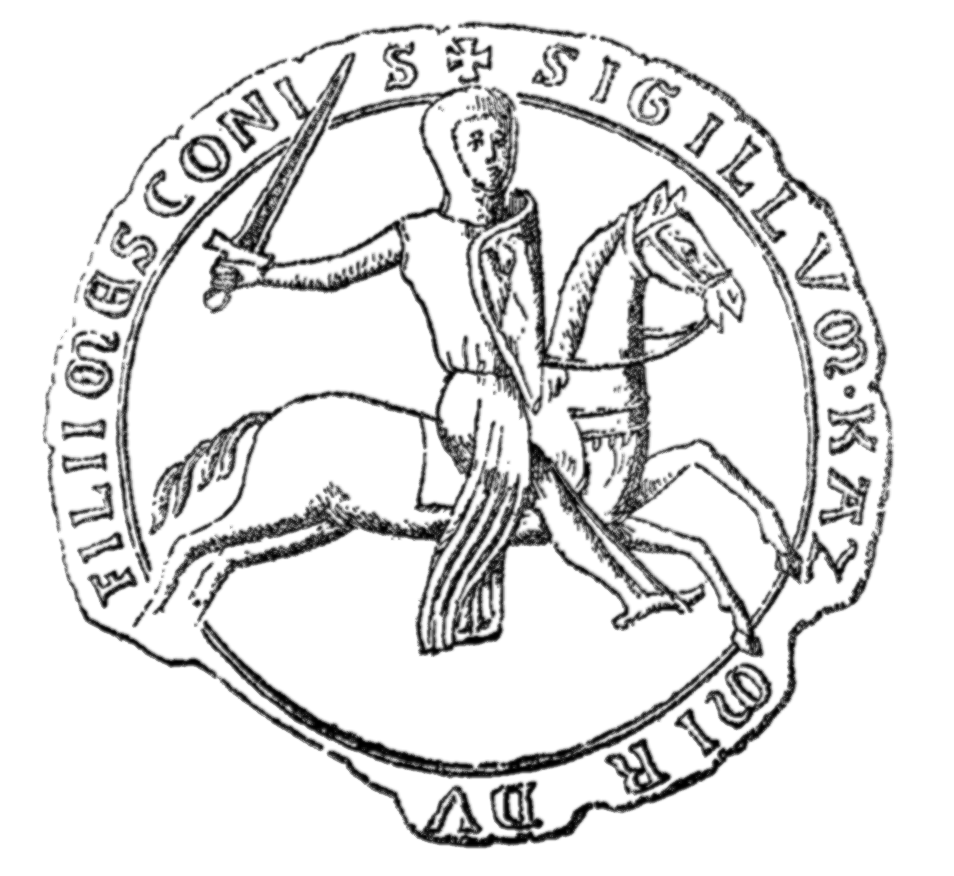
- Seal of Casimir I, 1226
- Born: c. 1179/80
- Died: 13 May 1230
- Buried: Czarnowąsy monastery
- Noble family: Silesian Piasts
- Spouse: Viola, Duchess of Opole
- Issue: Mieszko II the Fat; Władysław; Wenzeslawa; Euphrosyne
- Father: Mieszko I Tanglefoot
- Mother: Ludmilla

Casimir I of Opole (Polish: Kazimierz I opolski; c. 1178/79 – 13 May 1230), a member of the Piast dynasty, was a Silesian duke of Opole and Racibórz from 1211 until his death.

== Early life ==
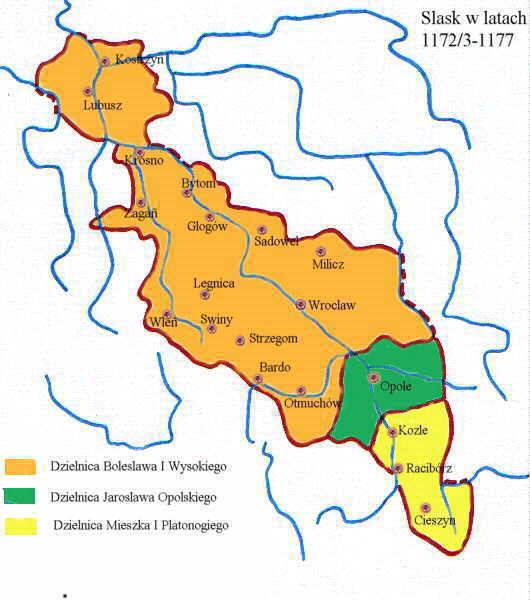
1173 Silesia with the subdivisions of Opole and Racibòrz

Casimir was the eldest child and only son of Duke Mieszko I Tanglefoot and his wife Ludmilla, probably a Bohemian princess of the Přemyslid dynasty. In 1172/73 his father had divided the Silesian lands with his elder brother Bolesław I the Tall and his nephew Duke Jarosław of Opole, and went on to rule as Duke of Racibórz in Upper Silesia.

Little is known about the early years of Casimir's life, except for his own birth, which was the pretext for an agreement between his father and Casimir II the Just, who since 1177 ruled as High Duke of Poland having deposed his elder brother Mieszko III the Old. Casimir II aimed to break the long-time alliance of Mieszko I Tanglefoot with his uncle Mieszko III the Old and in return granted to the Racibórz duke the Lesser Polish districts of Bytom, Oświęcim and Pszczyna as a gift. After the birth of Mieszko Tanglefoot's son and heir, Casimir II the Just stood as the child's godfather who was also named after him.

Mieszko I Tanglefoot significantly enlarged his territory, when after the death of his elder brother Bolesław I in 1201 he conquered the Duchy of Opole. Bolesław's son and heir, Duke Henry the Bearded had to cede the Opole lands to his uncle and also renounced any inheritance claims to Mieszko's Upper Silesian duchies. Upon the death of his uncle Miesko III the Old in 1202, Mieszko also raised claims to the Kraków throne, though he could not succeed until 1210.

== Rule in Upper Silesia ==
Upper Silesian Duchy of Opole-Racibórz (in yellow), 1217-1230

Mieszko I Tanglefoot died in 1211. While Leszek the White, son of Casimir II the Just, became High Duke of Poland, Casimir I was fully prepared to assume the government in his father's Upper Silesian duchies of Opole and Racibórz. Originally, he joined the coalition of the 'Junior Dukes' Leszek the White, Konrad I of Masovia, and Władysław Odonic, who fought against the politics of the Greater Polish duke Władysław III Spindleshanks and Duke Henry the Bearded. This was expressed mainly through cooperation with the church hierarchy, especially Bishop Wawrzyniec of Wrocław. In 1215, at the Congress of Wolbórz, Casimir I gave to the church great privileges and immunity, which was the origin of the semi-independent district of Ujazd, then property of the Wrocław diocese.

Casimir's extensive cooperation with the church also provided him with security against the ambitions of his neighbors; however, this only served to protect Racibórz: the lands of Opole were in conflict with the Lower Silesian duke Henry I the Bearded; and the Lesser Polish estates of Siewierz, Bytom and Oświęcim were disputed by the Seniorate in Kraków. During his rule, Duke Casimir moved his residence to Opole and emulated the ruling model of his cousin Henry the Bearded to encourage German settlers (Ostsiedlung) in his lands. He started the process of urban locations under German town law in Leśnica (Leschnitz) in 1217 and in the episcopal lands of Ujazd bishops in 1222. Further city foundations included Biała (Zülz) and Gościęcin (Kostenthal) in 1225, as well as Olesno (Rosenberg) in 1226. The settlement process contributed measurably to the economic development of Casimir's duchy; it did not develop to a great extent, however, as in Lower Silesia.

Given the increased power of Duke Henry I the Bearded during the 1220s, Casimir I's geopolitical position became more complicated. He took the only possible decision: close cooperation with his Lower Silesian cousin. The content of the agreement is unknown, but certainly during the unsuccessful trip of Henry I the Bearded against Kraków in 1225, troops of Opole-Racibórz were with him. This fact attests to the presence of political emigrants from Lesser Poland after 1225 in Opole-Racibórz (for example, the Gryfici family). After this year, the help of emigrants, like Klement of Brzeźnica (member of the Gryficis)-who took on part of the costs of building the city walls of Opole-proved to be good for Casimir I. The alliance with Henry I the Bearded also gave the Duke of Opole-Racibórz territorial benefits: in 1227 as a result of the confusion reigning in Poland following the death of High Duke Leszek I the White, Casimir I annexed the frontier fortress of Czeladź.

Casimir I died suddenly on 13 May 1230 (although some historians put his death one year earlier) and was buried in the Czarnowąsy (Czarnowanz) monastery.

== Marriage and issue ==
It is not known when the duke married, but after a reconstruction of the dates of his children's births, it is thought that this happened after the death of his father, between 1212–1220. The origins of Casimir I's wife Viola (d. 7 September 1251), are unknown. The 15th-century Polish chronicler Jan Długosz stated that she came from Bulgaria. They had four children:

1. Mieszko II the Fat (b. ca. 1220 – d. 22 October 1246), succeeded his father as Duke of Opole-Racibórz.
2. Władysław (b. 1225 – d. 27 August/13 September? 1282), Duke of Opole-Racibórz from 1246.
3. Wenzeslawa (b. ca. 1226/28? – d. 1 July aft. 1230?), a nun in Czarnowąsy.
4. Euphrosyne (b. 1228/30 – d. 4 November 1292), married firstly in 1257 to Duke Casimir I of Kuyavia and secondly in 1275 to Duke Mestwin II of Pomerania (they were divorced bef. August 1288).

After Casimir I's death, Henry I the Bearded assumed the regency and formal guardianship of his minor sons, while his widow Viola took over direct tutelage of them.

Casimir I of Opole House of Piast Born: c. 1179/80 Died: 13 May 1230
Preceded by Mieszko I Tanglefoot	Duke of Opole-Racibórz; 1211–1230	Succeeded by Mieszko II the Fat
