= Dietmar Wolter =

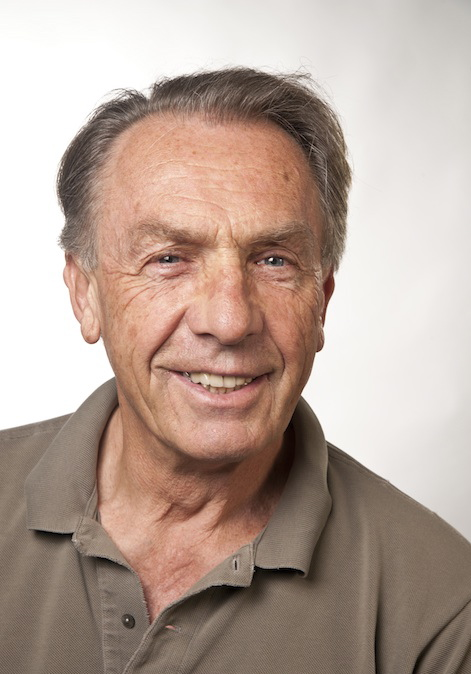
- Born: 27 September 1941; Klosterbrück, Province of Upper Silesia, German Reich
- Died: 22 May 2026 (aged 84); Hoisdorf, Schleswig-Holstein, Germany
- Occupations: Surgeon, inventor and entrepreneur

Dietmar Wolter (27 September 1941 – 22 May 2026) was a German surgeon, inventor and entrepreneur.

== Biography ==
After finishing his medical studies in Tübingen he became a resident physician of Martin Allgoewer in Basel and later a senior physician of Caius Burri in Ulm. 1971 he passes the USMLE. He habilitated in 1976 and was nominated extraordinary professor by the University of Ulm. With 36 years of age he was nominated as chief physician of the department of traumatology at the Asklepios Clinic St. Georg in Hamburg.

1980 he founded the Paul Sudeck Society in Hamburg and in 1987 the German Society for Spine Surgery.

In 1990 he was nominated medical director and chief physician for the department of trauma-, plastic- and reconstructive surgery at the Trauma Center in Hamburg.

During his active duty as a surgeon in Hamburg he founded the medical devices company Litos in 1987 and initiated in 1998 the scientific magazine Trauma und Berufskrankheit (Springer, Heidelberg) and 1990 the German Ilisarow Society.

2002 he passes his function as medical director and chief physician on to his successor Christian Juergens and concentrated on innovations of connector systems in nature, medicine and technology.

2005 he founded, together with surgeons, scientists and engineers the free working group on locked Osteosynthesis - AWISO and is currently the head of the Osteosynthesis Institute in Ahrensburg.

== Inventions ==
One of his inventions is the intelligent implant, an internal bone fixation system providing data which allows the surgeon to make conclusions about the healing progress of the bone. The implant can adapt its stability and can inform the patient and/or physician.

== Patents ==
Wolter holds numerous patents, mostly relating to tifix.
