= Duchy of Gniezno =

Polish duchy (1177–1279)

Duchy of Gniezno Księstwo gnieźnieńskie (Polish) Ducatus Gnesnensis (Latin)
- 1177–1279
- Flag Coat of arms

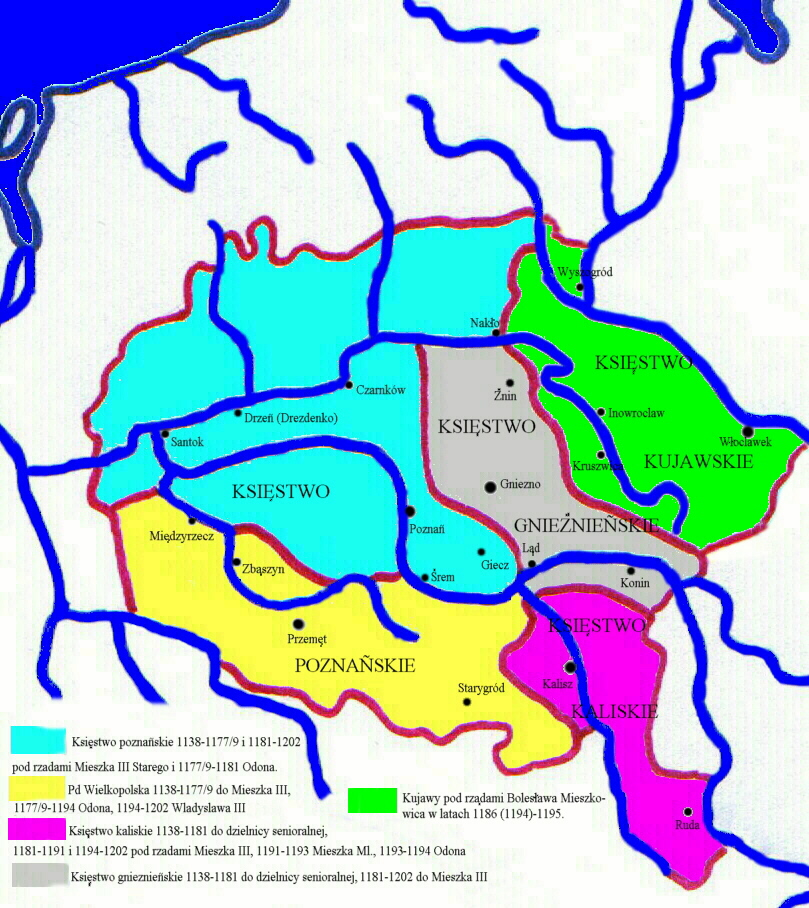
- Map of the Greater Poland with the political division.
- Status: Fiefdom within the Duchy of Poland (1177–1227); Independent state (1227–1279)
- Capital: Gniezno
- Official languages: Polish; Latin
- Religion: Roman Catholic
- Government: feudal duchy
- Duke
  - 1177–1181 (first): Casimir II the Just
  - 1273–1279 (last): Przemysł II
- Historical era: High Middle Ages
  - Partition of the Duchy of Greater Poland: 1177
  - Unification of the Duchy of Greater Poland: 1279
Preceded by	Succeeded by
Duchy of Greater Poland	Duchy of Greater Poland

The Duchy of Gniezno (Note: Polish: Księstwo gnieźnieńskie; Latin: Ducatus Gnesnensis) was a feudal district duchy in Greater Poland, with its territorial and administrative core in the Gniezno Land — the region surrounding the city of Gniezno. Its capital was Gniezno. The duchy was established in 1177, following the partition of the Duchy of Greater Poland after a rebellion against Mieszko III. Duke Casimir II the Just of the Piast dynasty became its first ruler.

Initially, Gniezno remained a fiefdom within the broader Duchy of Poland — a term commonly applied to the fragmented realm, which some sources continue to refer to as the Kingdom of Poland — until 1227, when Gniezno gained independence as a duchy. It existed in this form until 1279, when it was united with the duchies of Kalisz and Poznań under the rule of Przemysł II, forming a reconstituted Duchy of Greater Poland.

== Citations ==
=== Bibliography ===
- Józef Dobosz, Kazimierz II Sprawiedliwy
- Bronisław Nowacki, Przemysł II
- Jerzy Wyrozumski, Historia Polski do roku 1505
