= Duchy of Kalisz =

Polish duchy (1177–1279)

Duchy of Kalisz Księstwo kaliskie (Polish) Ducatus Calisiensis (Latin)
- 1177–1279
- Flag Coat of arms

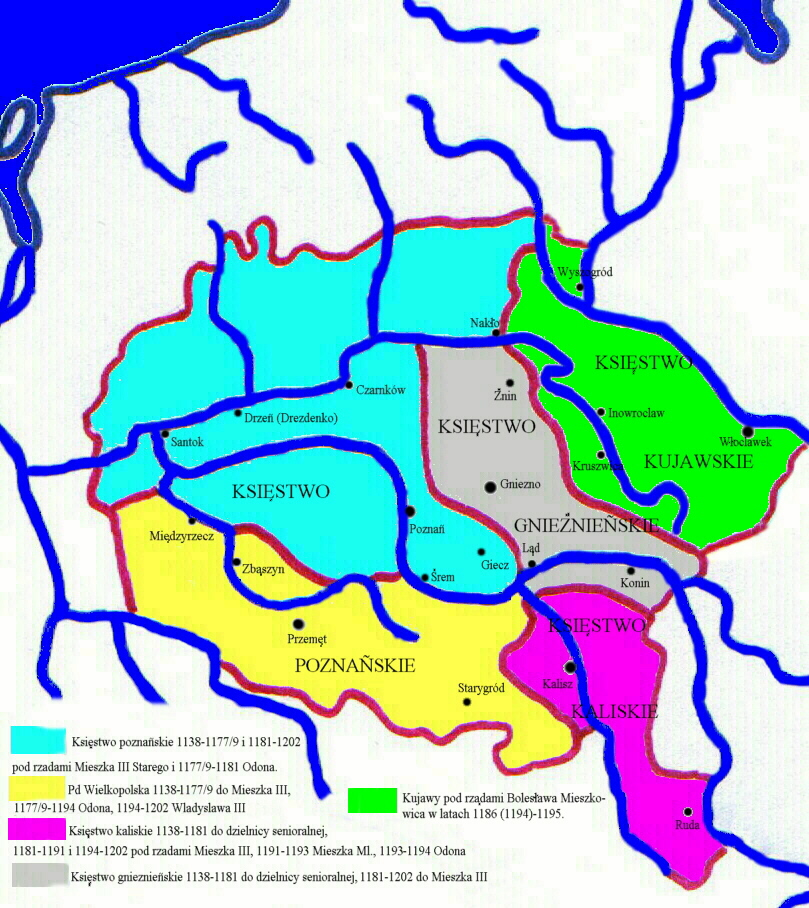
- Map of the Greater Poland with the political division.
- Status: Fiefdom within the Duchy of Poland (1177–1227); Independent state (1227–1279)
- Capital: Kalisz
- Official languages: Polish; Latin
- Religion: Roman Catholic
- Government: Feudal duchy
- Duke
  - 1177–1181 (first): Casimir II the Just
  - 1273–1279 (last): Przemysł II
- Historical era: High Middle Ages
  - Partition of the Duchy of Greater Poland: 1177
  - Unification of the Duchy of Greater Poland: 1279
| Preceded by | Succeeded by |
| Duchy of Greater Poland | Duchy of Greater Poland |

The Duchy of Kalisz (Note: Polish: Księstwo kaliskie; Latin: Ducatus Calisiensis) was a feudal district duchy in Greater Poland, with its territorial and administrative core in the Kalisz Land — the region surrounding the city of Kalisz. Its capital was Kalisz. The duchy was established in 1177, following the partition of the Duchy of Greater Poland after a rebellion against Mieszko III. Duke Casimir II the Just of the Piast dynasty became its first ruler.

Initially, Kalisz remained a fiefdom within the broader Duchy of Poland — a term commonly applied to the fragmented realm, which some sources continue to refer to as the Kingdom of Poland — until 1227, when Kalisz gained independence as a duchy. It existed in this form until 1279, when it was united with the duchies of Gniezno and Poznań under the rule of Przemysł II, forming a reconstituted Duchy of Greater Poland.

== Citations ==
=== Bibliography ===
Andrzej Wędzki, Kalisz w państwie wczesnopiastowskim i w okresie rozbicia dzielnicowego. In: Władysław Rusiński (redactor), Dzieje Kalisza. Poznań: Wydawnictwo Poznańskie, 1977.

- Józef Dobosz, Kazimierz II Sprawiedliwy
- Bronisław Nowacki, Przemysł II
- Jerzy Wyrozumski, Historia Polski do roku 1505
