= Viola, Duchess of Opole =

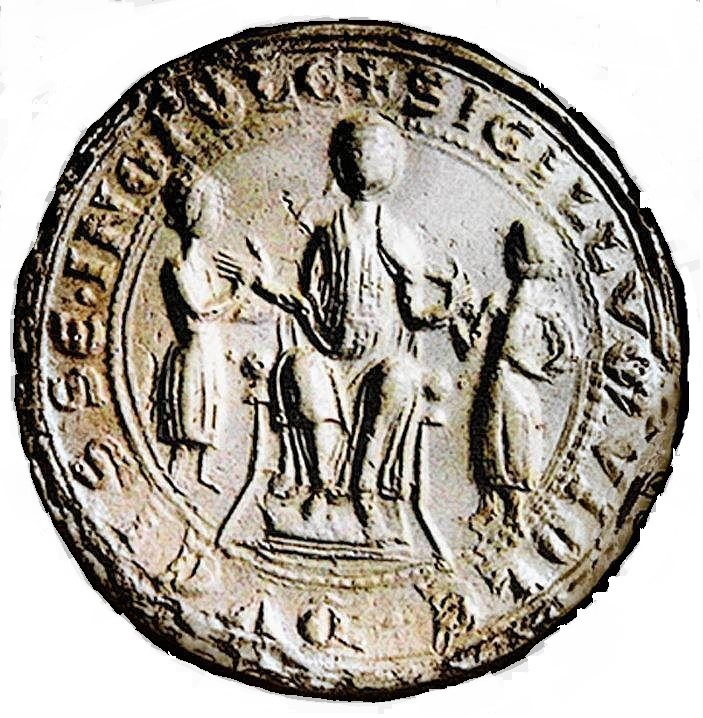
seal of Viola, Duchess of Opole

Viola, Duchess of Opole, also known as Veleslava (Bulgarian: Венцислава), Polish: Wencisława-Wiola; (died 7 September 1251) was a Duchess consort of Opole-Racibórz through her marriage to Casimir I. She served as regent during the minority of her sons Mieszko II and Władysław between 1230 and 1233.

== Life ==
=== Origins ===
Viola's father's origins are disputed by historians. Chronicler Jan Długosz noted that she was originally from Bulgaria. A more popular hypothesis about Viola's parentage was given by Władysław Dziewulski, who stated that she could be the daughter of either Kaloyan of Bulgaria or his successor Boril, but this theory has been challenged by Wincenty Swoboda. Jerzy Horwat put forward another hypothesis, under which Viola could have been a daughter of either King Béla III from his second marriage to Margaret of France or his son and successor, Emeric. Today, historians widely favor that the origins of Viola are unknown.

=== Marriage ===
Viola was married to Casimir I, Duke of Opole-Racibórz sometime between the years 1212 and 1216.

Arguments for Viola's Bulgarian origin involve her marriage to Casimir I, because she was not mentioned in any Polish source before the duke's departure on the Fifth Crusade. According to one hypothesis, the marriage of Casimir I and Viola may have been arranged by King Andrew II of Hungary. On his way home, the Hungarian King arranged several marriage contracts at the courts he visited for various of his children. One such contract may have been the engagement of his daughter Anna Maria to the Bulgarian Tsar Ivan Asen II. As a near kinswoman of the Tsar of Bulgaria, Viola could have become engaged to Casimir I, a close associate of King Andrew II, and returned with the King to meet her future husband.

According to another hypothesis, Casimir I befriended an unknown Hungarian knight, a relative of the King and a commander of the Hungarian troops, in Mount Lebanon, which was depopulated in January 1218. This would suggest that the marriage between the Duke of Opole and the king's near kinswoman Viola took place before his embarcation on the crusade, around 1217.

=== Widowhood ===
Casimir died on 13 May 1230. According to his will, Viola was appointed regent of the duchy on behalf of their sons, Mieszko II and Władysław, neither of whom had attained majority. Despite her efforts to maintain an independent rule, she was eventually forced to share, and later to cede, the regency of Opole-Racibórz to Henry I the Bearded, Duke of Wrocław.

In 1233, probably with the consent of the Duke of Wrocław, Pope Gregory IX issued a Bull under which the young dukes were removed from the care of their mother and given to the Archbishop of Gniezno and the Bishops of Wrocław and Olomouc. A year later, in 1234, to calm the rebellion caused by this decision, Henry I the Bearded gave Kalisz and Wieluń to Casimir I's sons and took full control of Opole-Racibórz, but without denying the dukes' hereditary rights.

Viola and her children moved to Kalisz, where they remained after Henry I's death in 1238, while his son and successor, Henry II the Pious, took over the regency of Opole-Racibórz. Soon after, Mieszko II began to claim rule over his duchy. Henry II was forced to accept this, and by late 1238 or early 1239, Mieszko II returned to Opole and began his independent rule. Viola and her second son Władysław were expected to remain in Kalisz, which was held under the guidance of Henry II. Viola remained as regent of the Duchies of Kalisz and Wieluń on behalf of Władysław until 1241, when he was declared an adult and able to rule in his own right.

Mieszko II died on 22 October 1246, without issue. In his will, he left all his land to his brother Władysław, except Cieszyn, which he gave to Viola as her dower. She ruled this land for the next five years, until her death, after which Cieszyn was reunited with the Duchy of Opole-Racibórz.

== Footnotes ==
Regnal titles
New title	Duchess of Cieszyn; 1246–1251	Vacant Merged with Opole-Racibórz Title next held by Mieszko I
