= Eufrosina Cruz =

Mexican politician

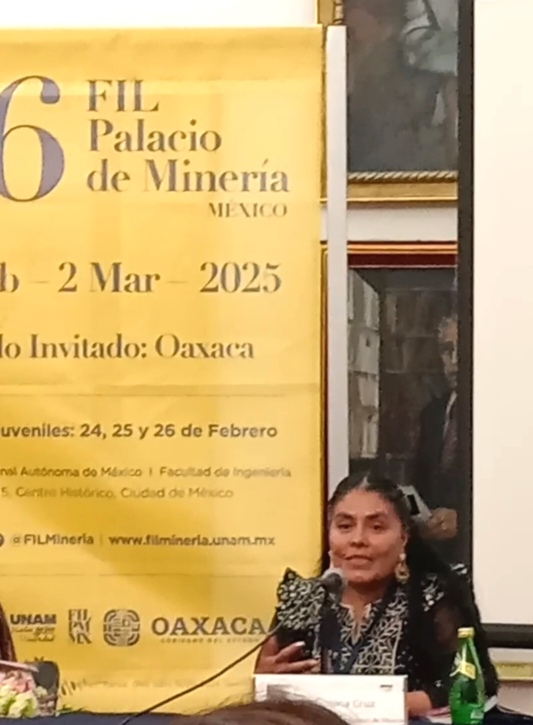
Eufrosina Cruz in 2025

Eufrosina Cruz Mendoza (born 1 January 1979) is a Zapotec activist for gender equality and the rights of indigenous women and communities. In November 2010 she became the first indigenous woman in Oaxacan politics, assuming the position of deputy of the National Action Party (PAN) and president of the board of the local congress. In December of the same year Eufrosina was appointed as coordinator of indigenous affairs of the National Executive Committee of the PAN. She is also the founder and director of the QUIEGO (Queremos Unir Integrando por Equidad y Género en Oaxaca) Asociación Civil, which promotes gender equality in Oaxaca.

The starting-point for her fight for gender equality was that she was not permitted to participate in the municipal elections of her home town Santa María Quiegolani, for the single reason that she is a woman. This was a valid reason according to the usos y costumbres (local traditional laws). Because of Eufrosina Cruz's fight, the constitution was later reformed to give women equal voting rights. On October 3, 2008 Cruz received the National Youth Award for her contribution to political culture, which was presented by President Felipe Calderón.

On June 30, 2018, she was expelled from the PAN due to her opposition of Ricardo Anaya's 2018 presidential candidacy.

== Background and context ==
Eufrosina Cruz comes from a tiny Zapotec village of Santa María Quiegolani in the state of Oaxaca, where Zapotec is the native language. Her life was as so many Zapotec women traditionally lived: getting up at 3 o'clock in the morning, gathering fuel, grinding maize, preparing tortillas, watching the children and cleaning the house. Most girls in such villages have little chance to complete grade school and are married at a young age to men chosen by their fathers. At the age of 11, Eufrosina Cruz decided that she didn't want to live like this and left to study and learn Spanish. She wanted a better future and eventually to help the other women that were discriminated against and marginalized. She graduated from college with a degree in accounting and obtained a job teaching in indigent communities. Here she served as community instructor for education and founded three high schools in indigenous municipalities. After this she returned to her original village with the intention to change the lives of the women there.

When she came back everything was still the same. Women were working hard but did not have equal rights. They were submissive to men and remained silent when men were around. Furthermore, women could not vote and did not have a voice in the law. Even so, Eufrosina ran for mayor of Santa María Quiegolani. This idea was revolutionary since the local political power was traditionally exclusively in the hands of men, and Eufrosina would have been the first female municipal president of Santa María Quiegoliani. It was a difficult struggle; most people didn't want a woman in the government and spread rumors, ridiculed and threatened her.

=== Usos y Costumbres Law ===
In 2007 she was eventually allowed in the election because the ruling family thought no one in town would dare to violate the tradition and vote for a woman. To everybody's surprise Eufrosina Cruz won the election (although the former authorities suggest otherwise). However, this victory was not accepted, and the election was annulled by the male authorities of the village. Votes for Cruz and her application for mayor were discarded. The former mayor of the municipality said "women do not exist here" and "women were created to serve men, to cook and care for children, but not to govern."

The indigenous authority based their reason for this on oral traditions that said that women are not allowed in political positions in the community. This was in a way valid, since the usos y costumbres (uses and customs) law in the Oaxacan constitution states that indigenous communities can elect and form parties according to their own traditions and customs. Oaxaca is the only state with this law, which is meant to respect the democratic practices of indigenous communities and protect their traditions. The communal authority is in this case stronger than the overall state politics. 418 out of 570 indigenous municipal laws are based on the usos y costumbres law; in 95 of these communities women did not have a voice or vote and were not permitted to make decisions for their community.

== Successes of Eufrosina Cruz ==
Eufrosina Cruz did not give up; instead, she addressed human rights organizations and state authorities. The matter was taken seriously, and she gained national recognition. As a consequence, on January 18, 2008, for the first time, a former governor visited Eufrosina Cruz's small community, to demand that women should be able to have better lives.

In February 2008 Cruz filed a complaint to the Human Rights Commission. The Commission recognized the violation of her rights. As a result, the government introduced an initiative to amend Article 25 of the state constitution, which was approved by the state congress. Since the September 21, 2009, Article 25 paragraph A section II of the Constitution of Oaxaca has stated the following: "La ley protegerá y propiciará las prácticas democráticas en todas la comunidades del estado de Oaxaca, para la elección de sus ayuntamientos, en los términos establecidos por el artículo segundo, apartado A, fracciones III y VII de la Constitución Política de los Estados Unidos Mexicanos y 16 de la Constitución Política de Oaxaca; establecerá los mecanismos para garantizar la plena y total participación de la mujer en dichos procesos electorales, y el ejercicio de su derecho a votar y ser votada en condiciones de igualdad con el de los varones, y sancionará su contravención." (translation: "The law shall protect and facilitate democratic practices in all communities of the state of Oaxaca, for the election of their councils, in the terms established by Article Two, Section A, sections III and VII of the Constitution of the United Mexican States and 16 of the Constitution of Oaxaca, establish mechanisms to ensure the full involvement of women in these elections, and the exercise of their right to vote and be voted [for] on an equal footing with that of men, and punish its violation.")

- March 2008: Eufrosina Cruz became founder and director of QUIEGO, AC (see below)
- October 3, 2008: Eufrosina Cruz received the Premio Nacional de la Juventud (National Youth Award) in the category of contribution to the political culture from the President of México.
- Cruz represented Mexico in the Iberoamerican conference on Gender and Development.
- Cruz represented Mexico in the conferences of female leaders in Iberoamerica.

=== QUIEGO, A.C. ===
In March 2008, Eufrosina Cruz founded the non-profit association QUIEGO (Queremos unir, integrando por la equidad y género, a Oaxaca). The goal of this nonprofit is to bring attention to the situation of indigenous women, and ensuring that injustice such as what Eufrosina went through will not happen again. QUIEGO stands for equality between indigenous men and women, and wants women to have equal rights in development, progress, and education. This will be done through promoting human rights, making the importance of freedom and being a woman clear, creating projects to improve women's quality of life, and women's rights workshops. It will not only affect Quiegolani but also other indigenous communities in Oaxaca.

- On December 6, 2008, QUIEGO organized the first forum in the history of the region to discuss the importance of women in community development and their right to access social programs.
- Shortly after the forum, the Secretariat of Agrarian Reform supported them with six exclusive productive projects for women, including a community pharmacy, a bakery, and a sewing project.
- In San Jose Quianitas, months later, women could vote and be candidates in their community.
- In November 2010 another successful forum for the freedom of indigenous women was held, organized by Eufrosina Cruz and QUIEGO.

In 2009 Eufrosina was approached by several political parties to participate in elections for the federal Chamber of Deputies. The president of QUIEGO rejected the proposals and urged these same parties to the creation of mechanisms for the participation of women in municipalities governed by custom.

In November 2010, Eufrosina Cruz was nominated as a candidate for deputy of the local congress for the PAN. When Gabino Cué Monteagudo (PAN) won the elections, Eufrosina was elected to the office of presidenta de la mesa directiva del congreso local (president of the board of the local congress), becoming the first indigenous woman to chair the state Congress of Oaxaca. On December 14 of the same year, Eufrosina was appointed as coordinator of indigenous affairs of the National Executive Committee of the PAN.
