= Euphrosyne of Opole =

Polish Duchess and regent

- Born: between 1228 and 1230
- Died: 4 November 1292; Brześć Kujawski
- Noble family: House of Piast
- Spouses: Casimir I of Kuyavia; Mestwin II, Duke of Pomerania
- Father: Casimir I of Opole
- Mother: Viola, Duchess of Opole

Euphrosyne of Opole (Polish: Eufrozyna opolska) (1228/30 – 4 November 1292) was a Polish duchess and regent.

She was a daughter of duke Casimir I of Opole and his wife Viola, Duchess of Opole, and a member of the House of Piast. She was Duchess of Kuyavia from her first marriage to Casimir I of Kuyavia, and Duchess of Pomerania from her second marriage to Mestwin II, Duke of Pomerania. She acted as regent of the Duchy of Kuyavia during the minority of her son Władysław I the Elbow-high in 1267-1275.

== Life ==
Euphrosyne's paternal grandparents were Mieszko I Tanglefoot and his wife Ludmilla, a disputed Bohemian princess from the Přemyslid dynasty. Mieszko was son of Władysław II the Exile, Duke of High Poland and his wife Agnes of Babenberg. Agnes was daughter of Leopold III, Margrave of Austria and his wife Agnes of Germany, who was a daughter of Henry IV, Holy Roman Emperor and his first wife Bertha of Savoy.

Euphrosyne's maternal family are disputed. Some believe her mother, Viola was a Bulgarian princess, daughter of either Kaloyan of Bulgaria or his successor Boril of Bulgaria. Boril was married to a Cuman women named Anna. The historian J. Horwat put forward another hypothesis, under which Viola could be a Hungarian princess, daughter of King Béla III (from his second marriage with Marguerite of France), or his son and successor Emeric. Today, the opinion prevails that Viola's origins are considered unknown.

Euphrosyne was the youngest of four children. She had two brothers and a sister: Mieszko II the Fat, Władysław Opolski and Wenzeslawa of Opole, who became a nun.

=== Duchess of Kuyavia and regent ===
Euphrosyne's first marriage was to her distant cousin Casimir I of Kuyavia. The couple married in 1257 when Euphrosyne was at most twenty-nine years of age. Casimir already had two sons: Ziemomysł of Kuyavia and Leszek II the Black from his first marriage to Constance of Silesia.

Euphrosyne and Casimir had four children, three sons and one daughter:

1. Władysław I the Elbow-high (1261 – 2 March 1333), King of Poland (1320–1333)
2. Casimir (1261/62 – 10 June 1294), killed while in battle in Lithuania
3. Siemowit (1262/67–1309/14), Duke of Kuyavia-Brieg, married Anastasia of Galicia (daughter of Lev I of Galicia)
4. Euphemia (died 18 March 1308), married Yuri I of Galicia

According to chronicles, Euphrosyne wished for her sons to inherit the lands of their father, but they would not inherit because of their two elder half-brothers. Euphrosyne wanted to poison her two stepsons so that her own sons could inherit Casimir's lands. This plot would explain a revolt of the two boys against their father, Casimir.

On 14 December 1267 Casimir died, leaving Euphrosyne a widow with four young children, plus two stepsons. She acted as regent for the boys. During her regency, there was a dispute with the Knights of the Teutonic Order and a land problem with Bolesław the Pious.

Eventually her sons and stepsons came of age and were able to rule their lands themselves.

=== Duchess of Pomerania ===
Euphrosyne married for a second time to Mestwin II, Duke of Pomerania in 1275. He had already been married to Judith of Wettin and had had two daughters: Euphemia and Catherine. It was unlikely the marriage was to produce children since Euphroyne was in her late forties at the time. After thirteen years of childless marriage, they divorced so Mestwin could remarry and possibly have more children.

Euphroyne returned to Kuyavia and lived out the rest of her days in Brześć Kujawski where she died on 4 November 1292 and was buried.
