= Duchy of Poznań =

Polish district duchy (1177–1279)

Duchy of Poznań Księstwo poznańskie (Polish) Ducatus Posnaniensis (Latin)
- 1177–1279
- Flag Coat of arms

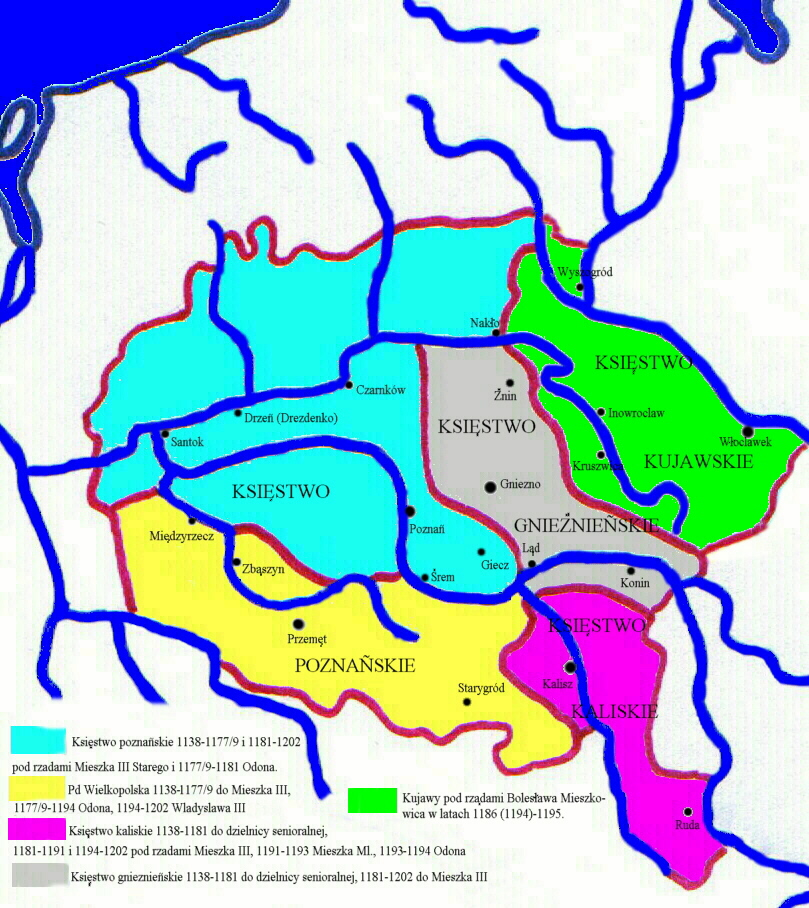
- Political division of Greater Poland
- Status: Fiefdom within the Duchy of Poland (1177–1227); Independent state (1227–1279)
- Capital: Poznań
- Official languages: Polish; Latin
- Religion: Roman Catholic
- Government: feudal district duchy
- Duke
  - 1177–1193 (first): Odon of Poznań
  - 1273–1279 (last): Przemysł II
- Historical era: High Middle Ages
  - Partition of the Duchy of Greater Poland: 1177
  - Unification of the Duchy of Greater Poland: 1279
Preceded by	Succeeded by
Duchy of Greater Poland	Duchy of Greater Poland

The Duchy of Poznań (Polish: Księstwo poznańskie; Latin: Ducatus Posnaniensis) was a feudal district duchy in Greater Poland, with its territorial and administrative core in the Poznań Land — the region surrounding the city of Poznań. Its capital was Poznań. The duchy was established in 1177, following the partition of the Duchy of Greater Poland after a rebellion against Mieszko III. Duke Odon of the Piast dynasty became its first ruler.

Initially, Poznań remained a fiefdom within the broader Duchy of Poland — a term commonly applied to the fragmented realm, which some sources continue to refer to as the Kingdom of Poland — until 1227, when Poznań gained independence as a duchy. It existed in this form until 1279, when it was united with the duchies of Gniezno and Kalisz under the rule of Przemysł II, forming a reconstituted Duchy of Greater Poland.
