= Battle of Racibórz =

1241 battle of the first Mongol invasion of Poland

Coordinates: 50°05′00″N 18°13′00″E

Battle of Raciborz
- Part of the first Mongol invasion of Poland
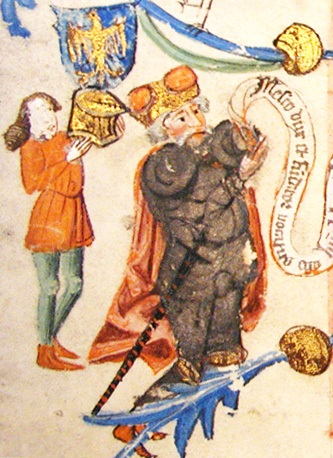
- Mieszko II the Fat, Duke of Opole-Racibórz
Date	20 March 1241
Location	Raciborz, Poland
Result	Polish victory

Belligerents
Mongol Empire	Kingdom of Poland

Commanders and leaders
Unknown	Mieszko II the Fat

Strength
Unknown	Unknown

Casualties and losses
Unknown	Unknown

The Battle of Raciborz took place in the Polish town of Raciborz, on 20 March 1241, during the Mongol invasion of Poland. It ended in the victory of a Polish army from Silesia, commanded by Duke of Opole and Raciborz, Mieszko II the Fat.

== The battle ==
On 20 March 1241, units of the Mongol Army reached the Oder near Raciborz, and began to cross the river. Duke Mieszko II the Fat, aware of this, decided to attack the invaders while they were busy trying to get across the Oder.

== Aftermath ==
After the battle, Mieszko's army headed towards Legnica, where Christian forces under Duke Henry II the Pious concentrated to engage the Mongols in the Battle of Legnica.

== Sources ==
- Piastowie. Leksykon biograficzny, wyd. 1999, str. 397
- Wielka Historia Polski cz. do 1320, wyd. Pinexx 1999, s. 187-188
- Stanislaw Krakowski, Polska w walce z najazdami tatarskimi w XIII wieku, wyd. MON 1956, str.136-137
