= Duchy of Świecie =

Former duchy in Pomerelia

Duchy of Świecie Księstwo świeckie (Polish)
- 1248/1264–1270
- Capital: Raciąż (before 1264); Świecie
- Official languages: Polish, Latin
- Religion: Roman Catholic
- Government: Duchy
- Duke
  - 1248/1264–1270: Mestwin II
- Historical era: High Middle Ages
  - Partition from the Duchy of Gdańsk: 1248/1264
  - Conquest of the Duchy of Lubiszewo: 1269
  - Conquest of the Duchy of Gdańsk and re-establishment as the Duchy of Pomerelia: 1270
Preceded by
Duchy of Gdańsk
Duchy of Kuyavia
Duchy of Lubiszewo
Succeeded by
Duchy of Eastern Pomerania
- Today part of: Poland

Duchy of Świecie (Polish: księstwo świeckie) was a duchy in Pomerelia centred around Świecie. Its only ruler was duke Mestwin II of the Samboride dynasty.

== History ==
The state was established between 1248 and 1264, with duke Mestwin II being given the lands by his father, Swietopelk II, from the Duchy of Gdańsk. He was originally given the lands around Raciąż and Szczytno, and around 1264, he incorporated into his territories Świecie, conquered from the Duchy of Kuyavia, which become the capital of the state. In 1269, it incorporated the Duchy of Lubiszewo, and the year later, in 1270, it conquered the Duchy of Gdańsk, uniting its lands into the Duchy of Pomerelia.
