= Czarnowąsy =

- District of Opole
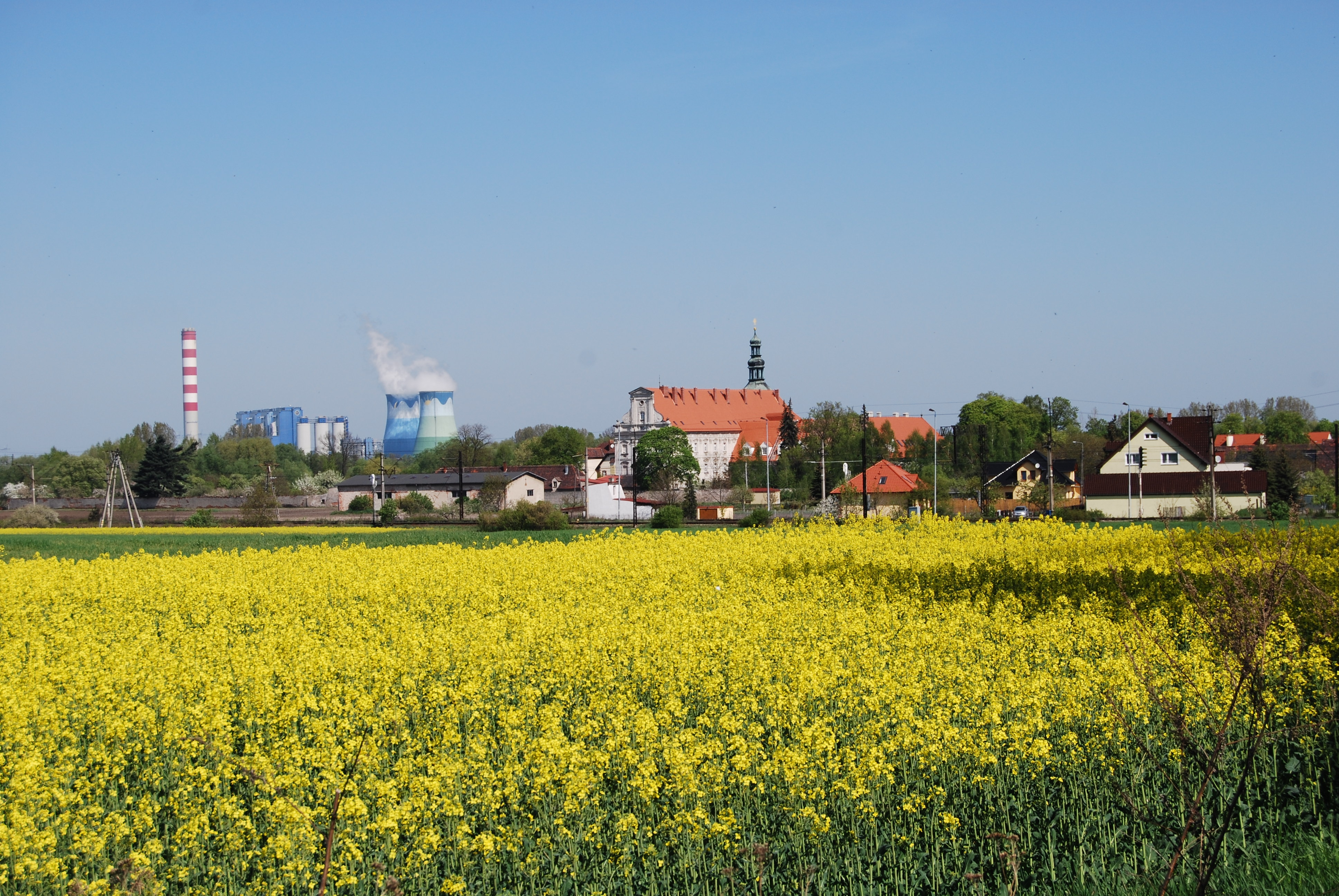
- Norbertine monastery and Opole Power Plant

- Location within Poland
- Coordinates: 50°43′31″N 17°54′00″E
- Country: Poland
- Voivodeship: Opole
- City county: Opole
- Elevation: 153 m (502 ft)

Population (2006)
  - Total: 3,108
- Time zone: UTC+1 (CET)
  - Summer (DST): UTC+2 (CEST)
- Vehicle registration: OP

Czarnowąsy [t͡ʂarnɔˈvɔ̃sɨ] is a district in the northern part of Opole, Opole Voivodeship, in south-western Poland, located on the Mała Panew near its confluence with the Oder. It formed a separate village in Gmina Dobrzeń Wielki until January 1, 2017, when it was incorporated into the city of Opole.

== Geography ==
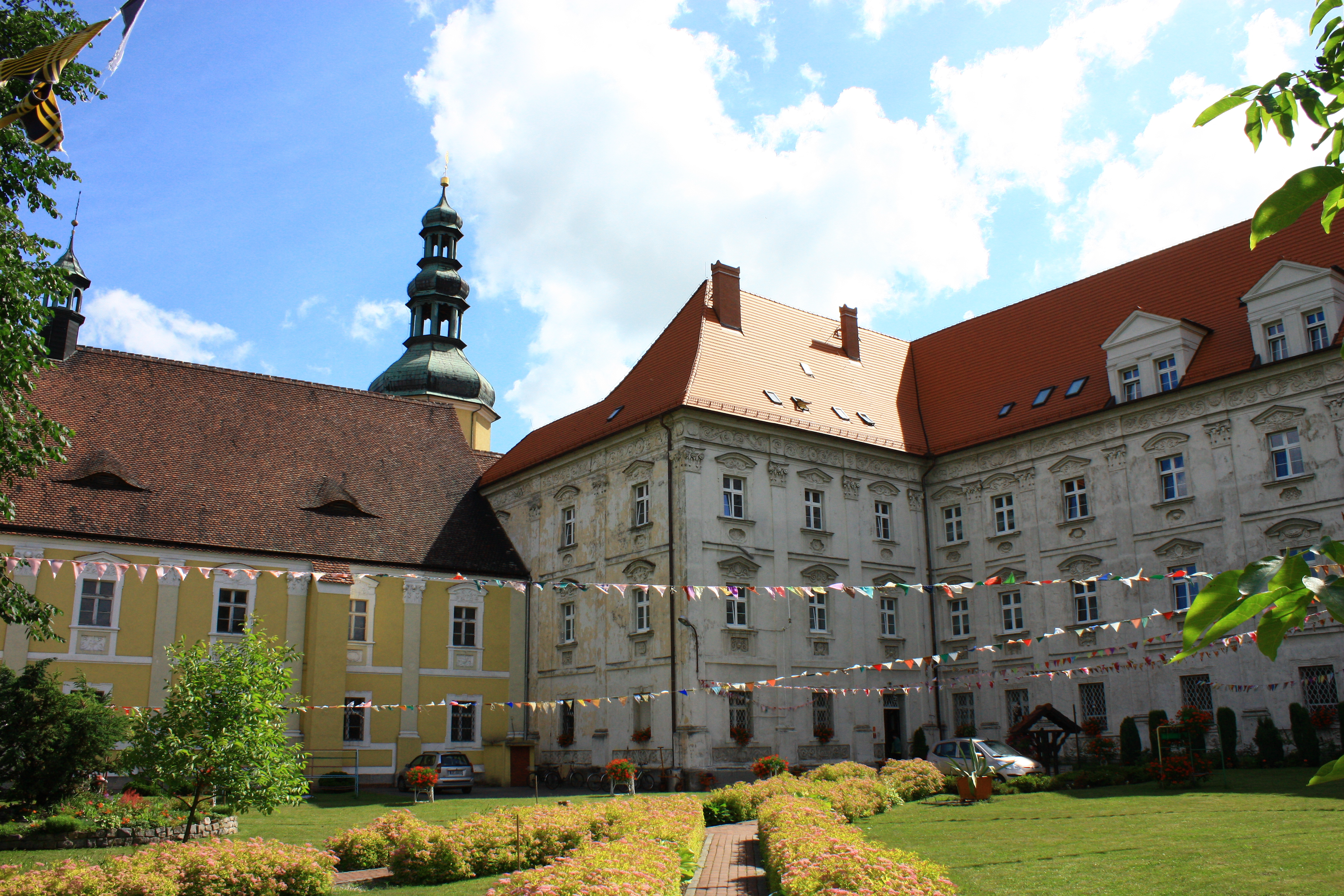
Monastery

It is situated on the Mała Panew river near its confluence with the Oder.

== History ==
The settlement of Czarnowanz was first mentioned in a 1228 deed of the Piast duke Casimir I of Opole, who moved a Premonstratensian (Norbertine) nunnery from Rybnik to the site, centred on the Church of St Norbert. The monastery was devastated by Swedish troops during the Thirty Years' War in 1643 and the nuns fled to Bolesławiec in Greater Poland. After the war, the monastery was rebuilt in a Baroque style finished in 1682.

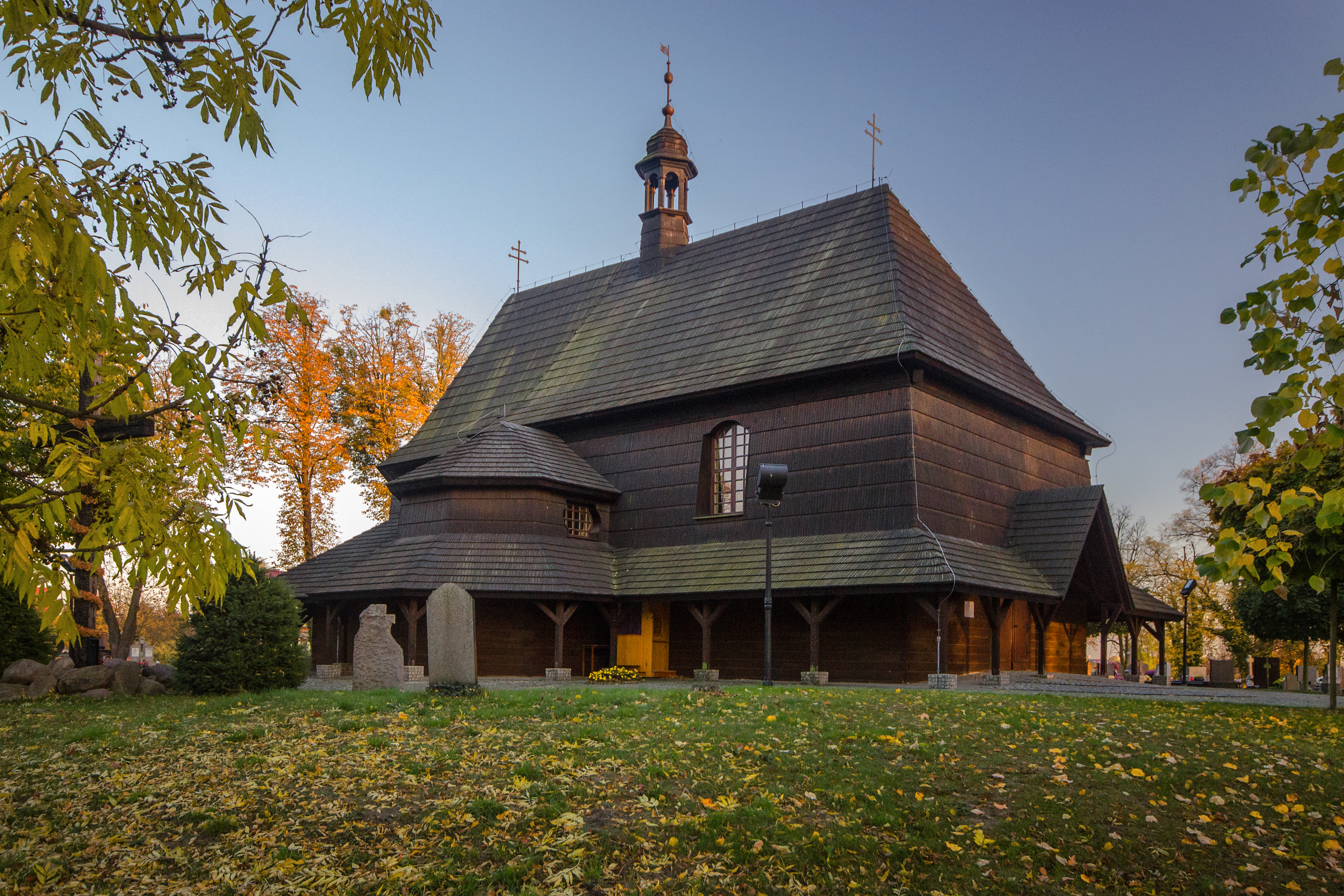
St Anne's Church

South of the village, a wooden Baroque church dedicated to Saint Anne was erected between 1684 and 1688; it burned down on 19 August 2005 in an arson attack and was reconstructed in 2007.

The convent’s estates were secularised by the Prussian authorities in 1810.

In the late 19th and early 20th centuries the complex functioned as the Heinrichstift foundation; in 1902 it was entrusted to the Sisters of St Hedwig.

Part of the German Empire from 1871, the village remained within the Province of Upper Silesia in the Weimar Republic after the Upper Silesia plebiscite of 1921; in 1936 the Nazi administration renamed it Klosterbrück as part of a wider campaign to remove Slavic toponyms — in this case a Polish-derived one.

After World War II the area became part of Poland (see Territorial changes of Poland after World War II).

== Notable people ==
- Dietmar Wolter (born 1941), German surgeon, inventor and entrepreneur.
