= Mestwin II of Pomerania =

Mestwin II of Pomerelia
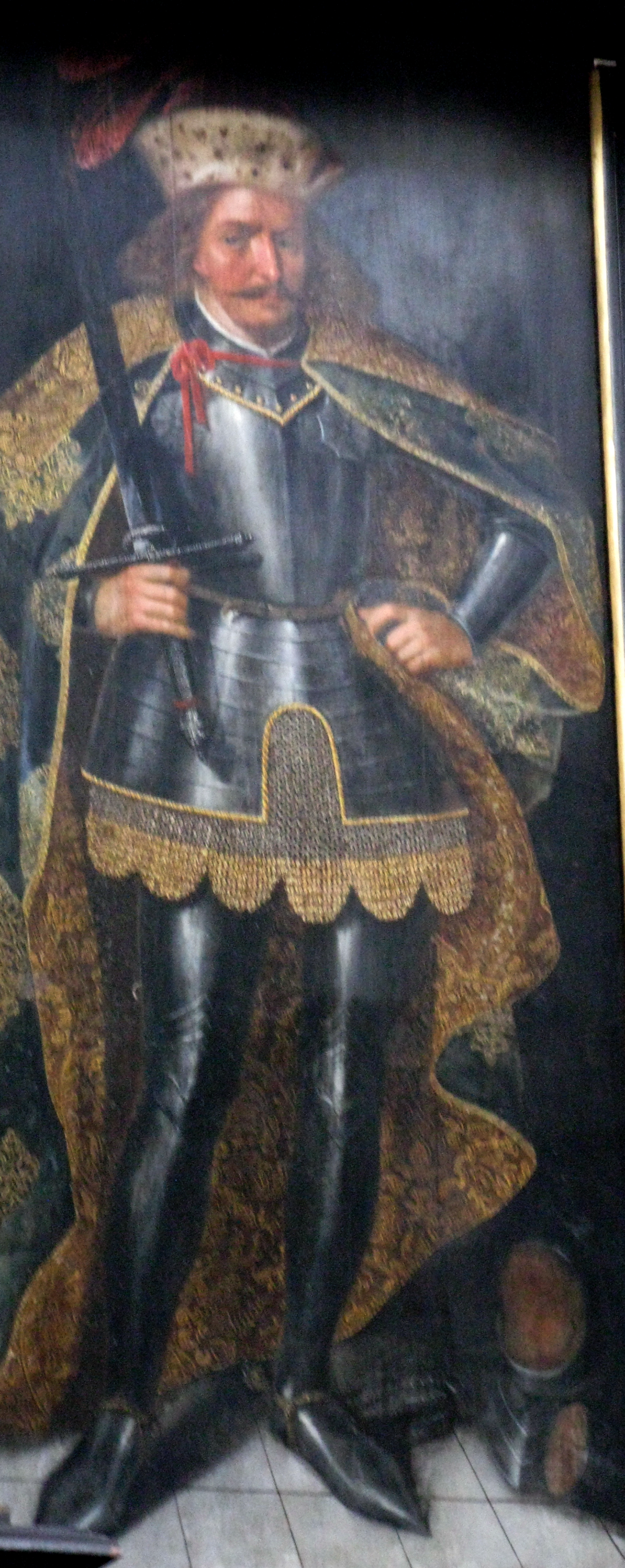
- Image of Mestwin at the cloister in Oliwa

Duke of Pomerelia
- Reign: 1271–1294
- Predecessor: Swietopelk II
- Successor: Przemysł II of Poland

Duke of Świecie
- Reign: from around 1250 until 1294
- Born: around 1220
- Died: 29 December 1294; Gdańsk
- House: Samborides
- Father: Swietopelk II
- Mother: Eufrozyna of Bohemia

Mestwin II (Polish: Mściwój II or Mszczuj II) (c. 1220 – December 25, 1294) was a Duke of Gdańsk Pomerania, member of the Samborides dynasty. He ruled Gdańsk Pomerania as a sole ruler from 1273 to 1294.

== Early life ==
Mestwin II was the son of Swietopelk II and the Přemyslid dynasty princess Eufrozyna. As a young man, in 1243 he was taken into the Teutonic Order custody as a hostage, part of the ceasefire agreement between his father and the Order, but the Order did not keep their part of this agreement and failed to return Mestwin II who was held by them until 1248 (for some time in the Order castle in Austria) when finally released.

== Acquiring power ==
Most likely upon returning from Teutonic Order captivity his father made Mestwin II the Duke of Świecie province circa 1250, and upon his father's death he began his challenge against his younger brother for Gdańsk in 1266, starting the so-called Pomerelian Civil War that lasted until 1273. He fought his younger brother and uncles until he emerged victorious and finally became the principal Pomerelia prince and sole ruler in 1273. He united all the lands of Gdańsk Pomerania (after the death of his uncles, Sambor II, prince of Lubiszewo and Racibor Białogardzki, prince of Białogarda.

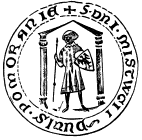
Seal of Mestwin II

== Alliances ==
Mestwin placed himself under the protection of the Ascanian Margraves of Brandenburg by recognizing their enfeoffment with Pomerania, which had already been made by the Emperor Fredrick Barbarossa and renewed in December 1231 in Ravenna by Emperor Frederick II. In the Treaty of Arnswalde on April 1, 1269, he took his area of power as a fief from the Brandenburg markgraves. The Brandenburg Ascanians were suzerains of the Duchy of Pomerania and in return for military and financial help he gave oath of fealty and paid homage over a couple Pomeralian to these dukes.

Mestwin's brother Wratislaw II of Pomerania, principal Pomerelian duke and ruler of Gdańsk, was forced out of his duchy by Mestwin II and most likely his new ally in 1271. This action resulted in Wratislaw II and Sambor II military action against Mestwin II, and his own knights and nobles rebelled against him. Surrounded by adversity and even taken prisoner (for a short time in 1270) Mestwin II gave the possession of Gdańsk to the Brandenburg duke Conrad who was holding the city of Gdańsk until Mestwin II forced them to resign from their possession of the city by use of force in 1273, having been strengthened by new alliance with his maternal cousin Bolesław Pobożny, the duke of Greater Poland. Defeated Wartislaw II found refuge with Ziemomysł of Kuyavia, the duke of Inowrocław and sought assistance from the Order, but he died unexpectedly in Wyszogród in 1271. The remaining male relatives of Mestwin II, his uncles Sambor II and Racibor, allied with the Order and various Piast princes, lost their possession within the Pomerelia due to Mestwin II actions against them, and also sought refuge with the Order and their daughters in Kuyavia (Sambor) and Silesia (Racibor). Both uncles died in the 1270s leaving Mestwin II the sole ruler of all unified Duchy of Pomerelia. Now he was faced with challenges from Brandenburg, the Teutonic Order, Pomeranian and Piast princes. As a result of the Order actions he was forced to give his castles and villages on the right bank of Vistula to them, and also the important left bank Pomerelian stronghold of Gniew, willed to the Order by his uncle Sambor II, a claim Mestwin II recognized under duress and Papal mediation in 1282. These pressures forced Mestwin II to tighten his alliance with Greater Poland's Bolesław and his successor Przemysł II.

== Treaty of Kępno ==
Mestwin II and Przemysł II, new duke of Greater Poland and future king of Poland, concluded the Treaty of Kępno in 1282 that was at first kept secret. The treaty, confirmed by magnates and nobles of both duchies, made both Mestwin and Przemysł II either a successor per donatio inter vivos or successor in all his possessions. It is known that Mestwin II remained the Pomerelia ruler until his death in 1294. It seems that the treaty of Kępno in fact unified Pomerelia and Greater Poland, starting the long process of reunification of Polish principalities by the Piast dynasts. During the life of Mestwin II nobles and magnates of Greater Poland received grants and appointments to Pomerelian offices and estates. In 1287 both princes entered into another successor treaty in Słupsk, and there they included in their succession treaty another Western Slavic prince, Bogusław IV of Szczecin. This treaty was confirmed and arrangement made public in Nakło, in 1291. These treaties resulted directly from aggressive policies of March of Brandenburg and the Teutonic Order against the territories of these Slavic duchies and provinces.

== Relations ==
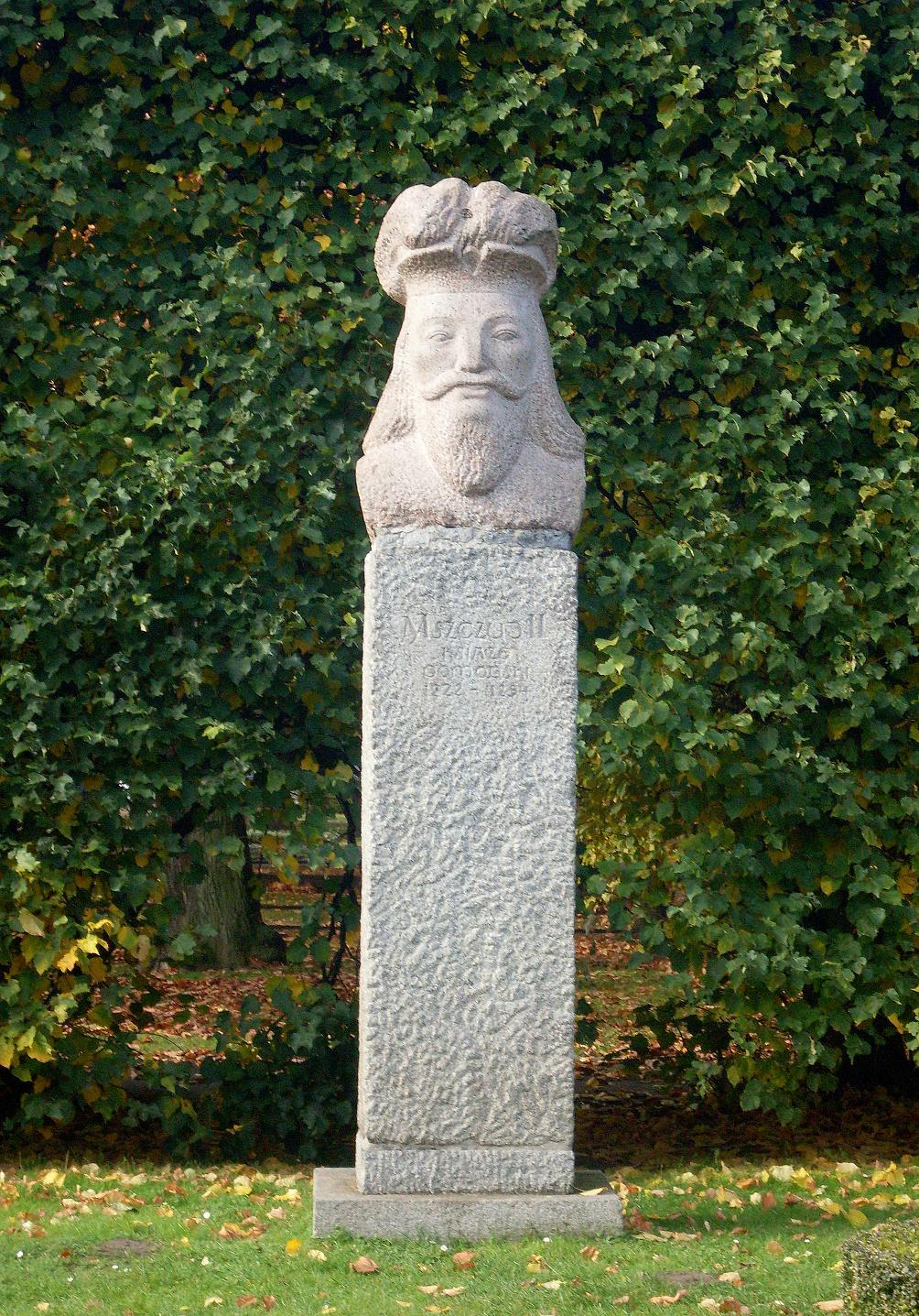
Monument of Mestwin II at Adam Mickiewicz Park in Oliwa.

He had three wives. First came princess Judith, daughter of Ditrich I duke of Brenna i Wettin, who died before 1275, then he married Piast princess Euphrosyne of Opole circa 1275 and they divorced in 1288, and finally married rather unknown Sulisława who died in 1292. He had two daughters: Katarzyna (Catherine), who married Pribislaw II, and Eufemia, eventually married to a Slavic or German prince.

He died in Gdańsk and was buried in the Cistercian Oliwa monastery. His own sarcophagus did not survive, most likely having been destroyed when the army of Gdańsk burned down the abbey during their rebellious war against king Stephen Báthory in 1577. However, the cumulative sepulcher of the Samboride dynasty still remains, founded in 1615 by one of the Oliwa abbots, Dawid Konarski.
