= Duchy of Greater Poland =

Historical Polish province

Duchy of Greater Poland Księstwo wielkopolskie (Polish) Ducatus Poloniae Maior (Latin)
- 1138–1177; 1279–1295; 1296–1320
- Coat of arms

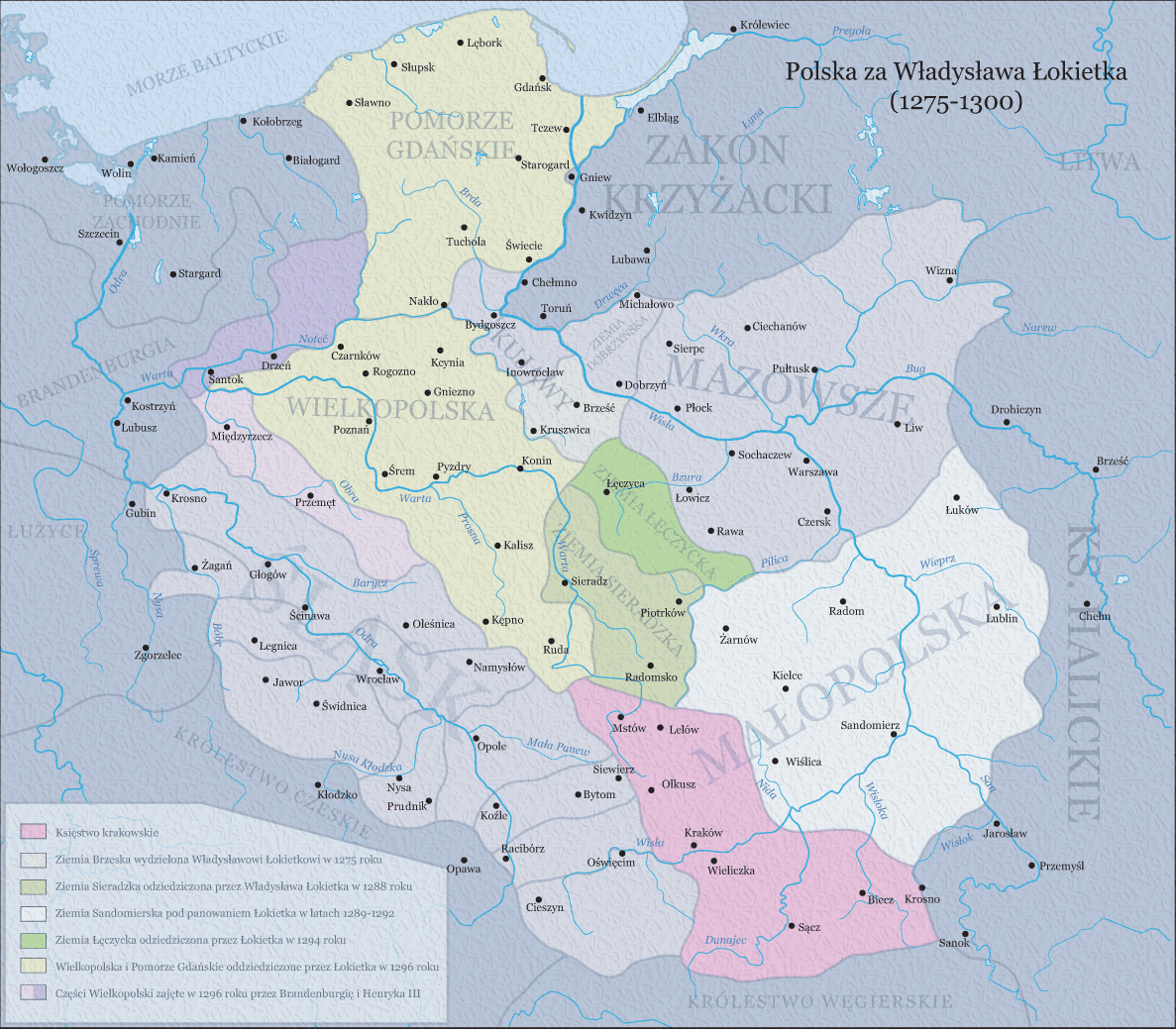
- Kingdom of Poland between 1304 and 1333, including the Duchy of Greater Poland.
- Status: District duchy of Poland
- Capital: Poznań
- Religion: Roman Catholic
- Government: District principality
- Historical era: High Middle Ages
  - Established: 1138
  - Acquired Kalisz and Gniezno: 1181
  - Internally divided into Poznań, Gniezno and Kalisz: 1191–1194, 1207–1229, 1234–1238, 1247–1250, 1253–1257, 1277–1279
  - Re-united under Przemysł II: 1279
Preceded by
Kingdom of Poland
Duchy of Poznań
Duchy of Kalisz
Duchy of Gniezno
Succeeded by
Kingdom of Poland
Duchy of Poznań
Duchy of Kalisz
Duchy of Gniezno
- Today part of: Poland; Germany¹
- ¹ Portion of Lubusz Land on the left bank of the Oder River

The Duchy of Greater Poland (Note: Polish: Księstwo wielkopolskie; Latin: Ducatus Poloniae Maior) was a district principality that encompassed much of the historical region of Greater Poland, with a territory roughly corresponding to the present-day Greater Poland Voivodeship in west-central Poland. It emerged in the 12th century following the 1138 testament of Bolesław III Wrymouth, which divided the previously unified Kingdom of Poland into several hereditary duchies, initiating a period of feudal fragmentation. Although nominally part of the Polish realm, the duchy functioned as a semi-autonomous Piast principality, governed independently by its own dukes.

In 1177, the Duchy of Greater Poland was subdivided into the principalities of Poznań, Gniezno, and Kalisz following the deposition of Mieszko III the Old, whose authoritarian rule had provoked opposition among the nobility and rival Piast princes. This internal conflict led to a redistribution of power within the region. The principalities were later reunited in 1279 under Przemysł II, forming a unified duchy that lasted until 1320, when it was reabsorbed into the restored Kingdom of Poland. The duchy's capital was Poznań, and its territory closely aligned with that of the modern Greater Poland Voivodeship.

== History ==
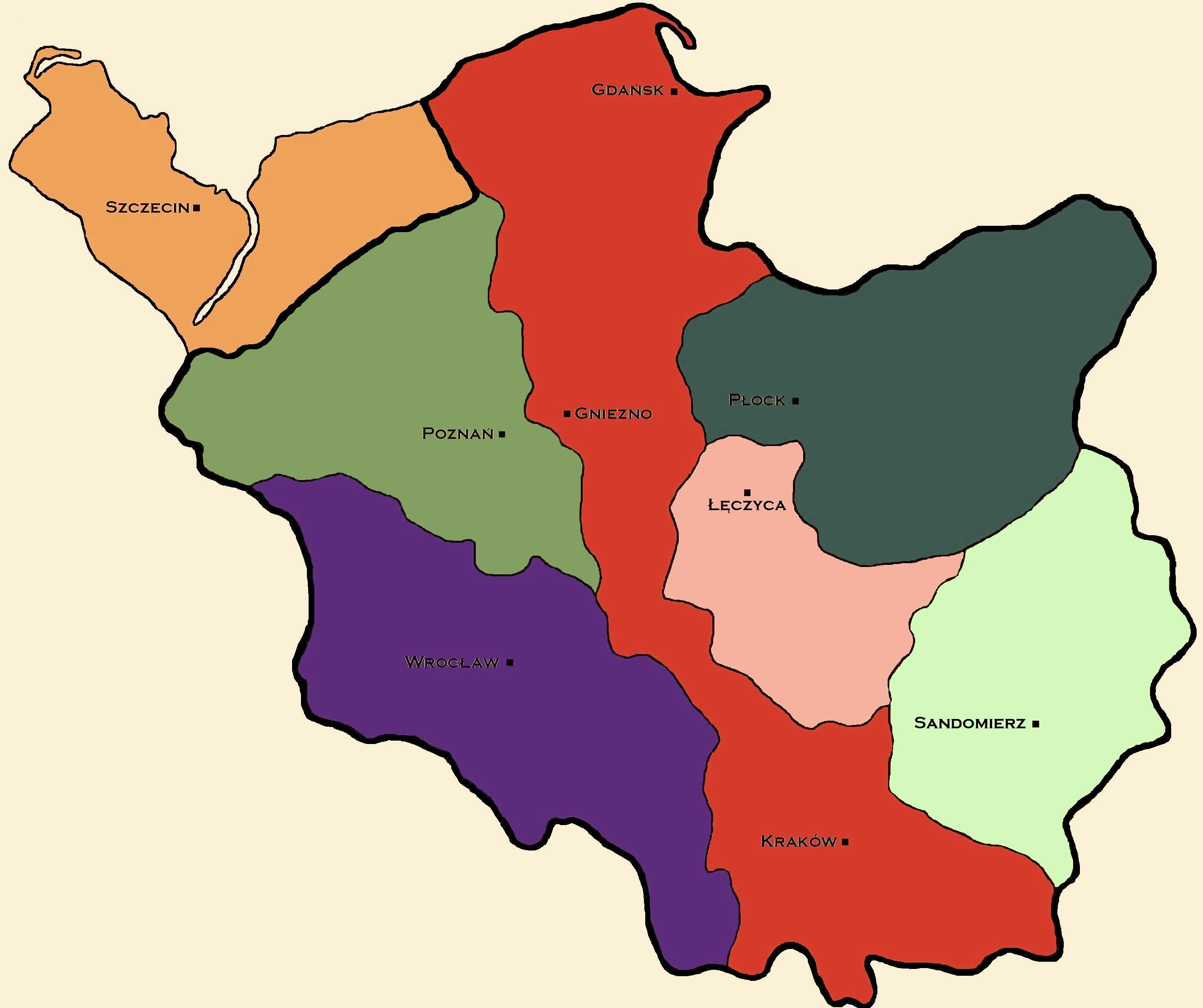
Fragmentation of Poland in 1138: Duchy of Greater Poland, ruled by Mieszko III the Old, comprising western Greater Poland

Upon the death of the Polish Piast duke Bolesław III Wrymouth in 1138, his realm was divided according to his testament into four to five hereditary provinces, each assigned to one of his sons. He also established the Seniorate Province of Kraków, reserved for his eldest son, Władysław II, who was designated as the High Duke and nominal overlord of all Poland.

=== Mieszko III the Old ===
As one of the provinces created by the 1138 testament, Greater Poland was assigned to Mieszko III the Old, the third son of Duke Bolesław III Wrymouth. Initially, Mieszko III ruled the western part of the Greater Polish lands, centered around Poznań. His dominion bordered the Duchy of Silesia to the south, the Seniorate Province to the east, and the Pomeranian territories to the north. To the west, Greater Poland extended to Lubusz Land, situated on the western frontier of Poland, where in 1157, the Ascanian count Albert the Bear established the Imperial Margraviate of Brandenburg.

After the death of his brother Bolesław IV the Curly in 1173, Mieszko III the Old became High Duke of Poland in accordance with the principle of agnatic seniority established in Bolesław III Wrymouth's testament. However, his rule was soon challenged by a rebellion in Kraków, instigated by the magnates of Lesser Poland and led by his younger brother Casimir II the Just, with support from Mieszko's own son Odon, who feared for his inheritance. Casimir seized the high ducal title, and in 1179, Odon went so far as to expel his father from the Greater Polish lands. Mieszko fled to the Duchy of Pomerania, where he found refuge at the court of Bogislaw I, husband of his daughter Anastasia.

With the support of Pomeranian forces, Mieszko III the Old returned to his duchy in 1181 and successfully seized the adjacent territories of Gniezno and Kalisz, which had previously belonged to the Seniorate Province. His son Odon was forced to abandon Poznań, retaining only a narrow strip of land south of the Obra River. Although Mieszko's subsequent efforts to reclaim the high ducal title were unsuccessful, he managed to expand his domain further in 1186 by annexing Kuyavia, extending his control eastward to the Vistula River. This territory had been ruled by his late nephew, Leszek of Masovia. Mieszko granted Kuyavia to his son Bolesław, but following Bolesław's death in 1195, the region was again detached from Greater Poland when Mieszko was compelled to cede it to Duke Konrad of Masovia, son of Casimir II, in 1199.

In 1191, Mieszko III the Old briefly reconquered Kraków; however, his decision to entrust the rule of Lesser Poland to his son Mieszko the Younger proved unsuccessful. Casimir II the Just soon regained control of the Polish throne, forcing Mieszko the Younger to flee to his father, who then installed him as Duke of Kalisz. Following Mieszko the Younger's death in 1193, Mieszko III reconciled with his eldest son Odon and granted him the Duchy of Kalisz. Upon Odon's death the following year, all Greater Polish lands were reunited under Mieszko's rule. He subsequently ceded Odon's former territories south of the Obra River to his only surviving son, Władysław III Spindleshanks.

By 1194, Mieszko III had outlived all his brothers. Yet Leszek I the White, son of Casimir II, like his father, refused to recognize Mieszko's authority in Kraków. Upon Mieszko's death in 1202, his son Władysław III was soon confronted by rival claims from his cousin.

=== Władysław Spindleshanks and Władysław Odonic ===
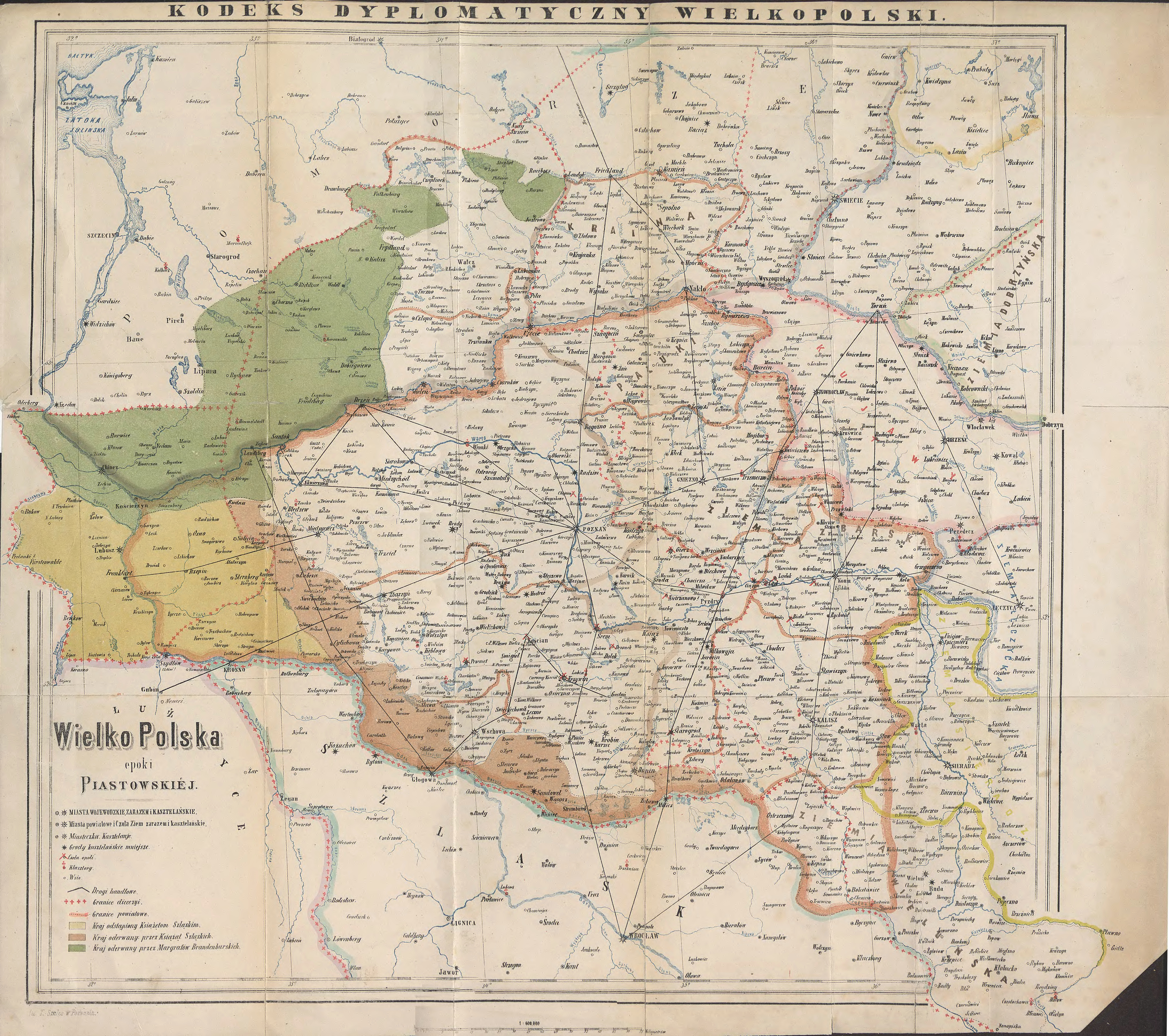
Map of the 13th-century Duchy of Greater Poland. Territories lost in the 13th century marked in yellow (Lubusz Land) and green (northwestern Greater Poland)

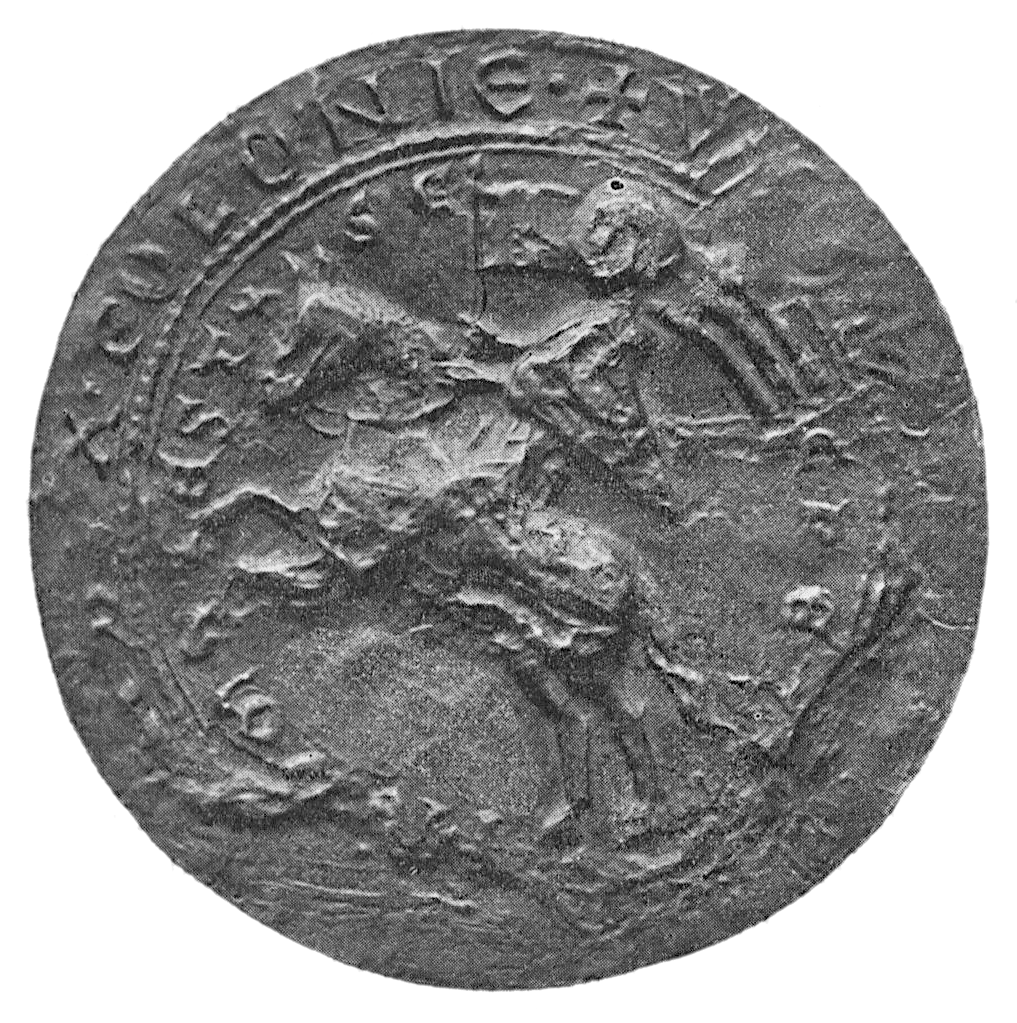
Ducal seal of Władysław Odonic, 1231

In 1206, Władysław III Spindleshanks lost the high ducal title to Leszek I the White and was soon confronted by a rebellion led by his nephew, Władysław Odonic, the son of his late brother Odon. Odonic laid claim to the lands of Kalisz, which his father had held in 1193–94, and secured the backing of the Archbishop of Gniezno. Despite this support, his initial attempts to depose his uncle were unsuccessful. Nevertheless, he eventually gained control of Kalisz, aided by Duke Henry I the Bearded of Silesia, and from 1216, also ruled the Greater Polish territories south of the Obra River, which had belonged to his father until he died in 1194.

In 1217, conflict reignited when Władysław III Spindleshanks reconciled with Leszek I the White and Henry I the Bearded, gaining their support to expel his rebellious nephew, Władysław Odonic, who fled to the court of Duke Swietopelk II of Pomerelia. Despite this alliance, Odonic was only able to seize the Greater Polish territory of Ujście in 1223.

In 1227, Swietopelk launched a surprise attack on a ducal assembly (wiec) at Gąsawa, during which High Duke Leszek was killed and Duke Henry seriously wounded. Spindleshanks did not attend the meeting, a decision that likely saved his life. The death of Leszek also removed his long-time rival, allowing Spindleshanks to claim the high ducal title.

Accused of involvement in the Gąsawa assault, Odonic withdrew to Masovia, where he forged a new alliance with Duke Konrad I. With the combined support of Pomerelia and Masovia, Odonic succeeded in taking control of the entire Duchy of Greater Poland from Spindleshanks in 1229.

Władysław III Spindleshanks fled to Silesia and died without issue two years later, leaving his nephew Władysław Odonic as the sole heir of the Greater Polish line. However, Odonic soon faced territorial claims from Henry I the Bearded, Duke of Silesia and High Duke of Poland from 1232, who began conquering most of Odonic's lands from 1234 onward. When Henry I was succeeded by his son Henry II the Pious in 1238, Odonic was reduced to controlling only the area around Ujście. He died the following year, after which High Duke Henry II assumed control over all of Greater Poland, ruling until his death at the Battle of Legnica in 1241.

=== Przemysł I and Bolesław the Pious ===
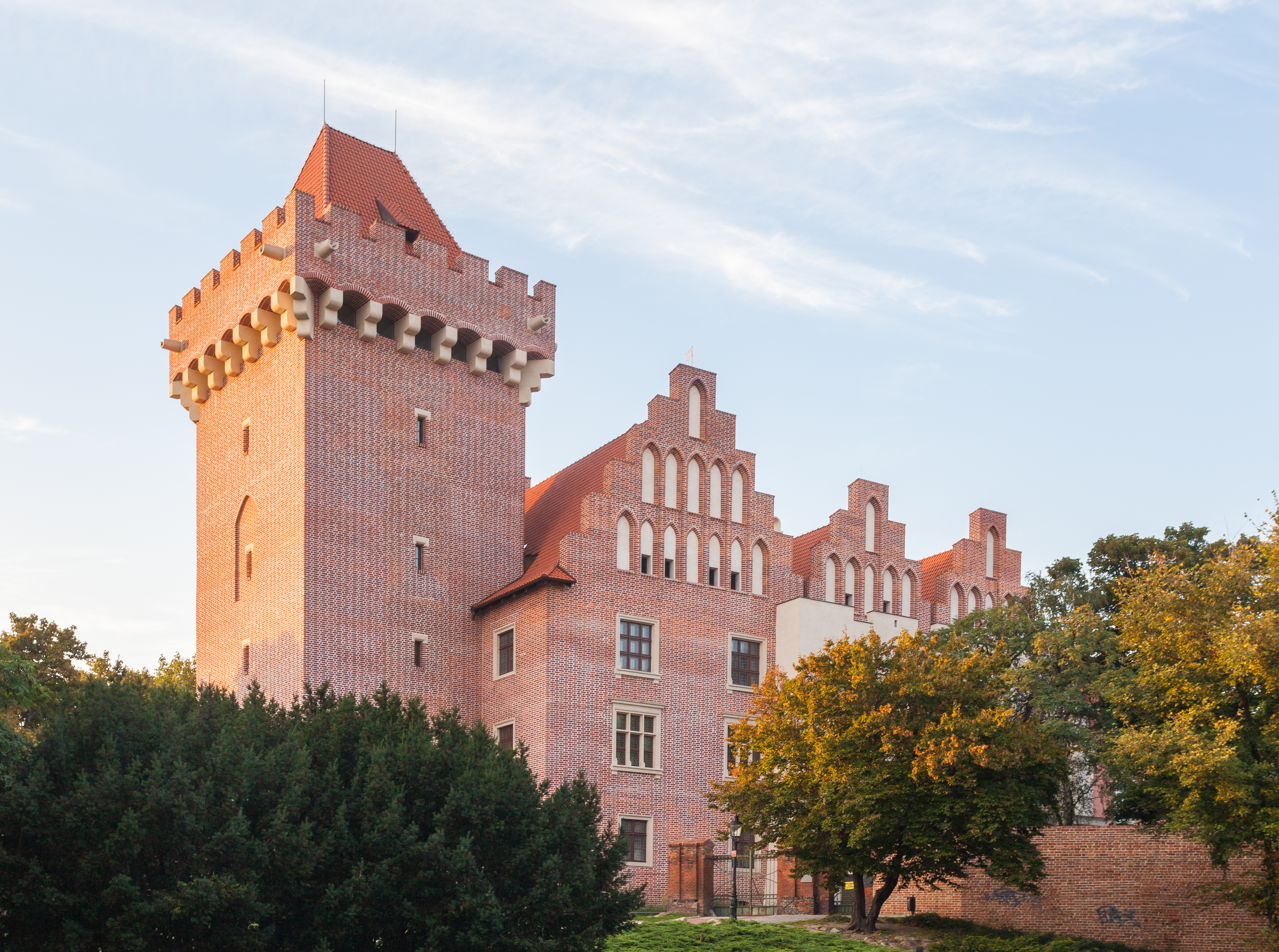
The rebuilt Royal Castle, Poznań in Poznań

The Greater Polish line of the Piasts was continued by the sons of Władysław Odonic, Przemysł I and his younger brother Bolesław the Pious. Initially, they had to reclaim their inheritance from the Silesian successors of Henry II the Pious. Soon after, tensions arose between the brothers: in 1247, Bolesław rebelled against Przemysł with the support of local nobles. The duchy was formally divided, with Bolesław receiving the smaller district of Kalisz. The conflict persisted, as Bolesław, dissatisfied, also laid claim to Gniezno. In 1250, Przemysł had him deposed and imprisoned, but in 1253, through the mediation of the Archbishop of Gniezno, Bolesław was reinstated as Duke of Kalisz and Gniezno.

Przemysł also faced external pressure from the Brandenburg margraves John I and Otto III, who had acquired Lubusz Land on the western border of his duchy from Duke Bolesław II Rogatka in 1248. Upon Przemysł's death in 1257, Bolesław the Pious became the sole ruler of Greater Poland. In 1264, he issued the Statute of Kalisz, a landmark legal act that extended rights and protections to the Jewish population within his domain.

=== Przemysł II ===
Greater Poland was once again reunited under the rule of Przemysł II, son of Przemysł I, in Poznań in 1279. In the west, the Brandenburg margraves had transformed Lubusz Land into the nucleus of the New March, founding the town of Landsberg (present-day Gorzów Wielkopolski) in 1257. Przemysł II countered Brandenburg's expansion by allying with their rival, Duke Bogislaw IV of Pomerania.

Following the death of Henry IV Probus in 1290, Przemysł briefly took control of Kraków, the symbolic seat of the Polish crown. However, lacking strong support among the nobility of Lesser Poland and facing pressure from Bohemian interests, he soon relinquished his claim to the city, transferring it to King Wenceslaus II of Bohemia. He later inherited Pomerelia through a succession agreement with Duke Mestwin II, significantly expanding his realm to include access to the Baltic Sea. This territorial consolidation strengthened his claim to national leadership, and in 1295, he was crowned King of Poland, marking a brief restoration of the Polish monarchy. However, the Greater Polish Piast line became extinct the following year when Przemysł II was abducted and assassinated.

Przemysł II's succession was claimed by his Kuyavian cousin, Władysław I the Elbow-high, who faced rivalry from Henry III of Głogów, a Silesian Piast. Przemysł had made succession agreements with both claimants, leading to a contested inheritance. Meanwhile, the Brandenburg margraves exploited the instability to capture the strategic fortress of Santok on the Warta River. In 1300, both Piasts were compelled to renounce their claims in favor of King Wenceslaus II of Bohemia, who assumed the Polish crown.

After Wenceslaus died in 1305, the rivalry resumed. Following a brief period of rule by various Piast dukes, Greater Poland ultimately fell to Władysław I, who was crowned King of a re-united Poland in 1320. With this coronation, the Duchy of Greater Poland ceased to exist as a separate political entity and was reorganized into the Poznań Voivodship and Kalisz Voivodship under the unified Polish Crown.

== Dukes of Greater Poland ==
From year	Duchy of Greater Poland		
From year	Poznań	Gniezno	Kalisz
1138	Mieszko III the Old	part of the Seniorate Province	
1179	Odon of Poznań	part of the Seniorate Province	
1181	Mieszko III the Old; Polish high duke from 1198		
1191			Mieszko the Younger
1193			Odon of Poznań
1194			
1202	Władysław III Spindleshanks; Polish high duke until 1206 and 1227–1229		
1207			Władysław Odonic
1217			
1227			
1229	Władysław Odonic		
1234	Henry I the Bearded		Henry I the Bearded
1238	Henry II the Pious		
1241	Przemysł I and Bolesław the Pious		
1247			Bolesław the Pious
1249		Bolesław the Pious	
1250	Przemysł I		
1253			
1257	Bolesław the Pious		
1277			
1279	Przemysł II; Polish high duke 1290–1291, King of Poland from 1295		
1296	Władysław I the Elbow-high		
1300	King Wenceslaus II of Bohemia		
1302			
1306	Henry III of Głogów		
1309	Przemko II of Głogów, Henry IV the Faithful, John of Ścinawa, Bolesław of Oleśnica, Konrad I of Oleśnica		
1312	Przemko II, Henry IV, John	Bolesław and Konrad I	
1313	Przemko II, Henry IV, John	Bolesław	Konrad I
1314	Władysław I the Elbow-high; King of a united Kingdom of Poland from 1320		
1314	Turned into the Poznań Voivodeship	Merged to form the Kalisz Voivodship	

Rulers of all Greater Poland

- 1194-1202 Mieszko III the Old, Polish high duke from 1198
- 1202–1207 Władysław III Spindleshanks, Polish high duke until 1206 and 1227–1229
- 1229–1234 Władysław Odonic
- 1238–1241 Henry II the Pious of Silesia, Polish high duke
- 1241–1247 Przemysł I and Bolesław the Pious
- 1250–1253 Przemysł I
- 1257–1277 Bolesław the Pious
- 1279–1296 Przemysł II, Polish high duke 1290–1291, King of Poland from 1295
- 1296–1300 Władysław I the Elbow-high
- 1300–1305 King Wenceslaus II of Bohemia
- 1305–1309 Henry III of Głogów
- 1309–1312 Przemko II of Głogów, Henry IV the Faithful, John of Ścinawa, Bolesław of Oleśnica, Konrad I of Oleśnica
- from 1314 Władysław I the Elbow-high, King of Poland from 1320.

Turned into the Greater Poland province of the united Kingdom of Poland, divided into the Poznań Voivodship and Kalisz Voivodship.

== See also ==
- History of Poland during the Piast dynasty
- List of Polish monarchs
- Piast dynasty
- History of Poznań
