= Congress of Visegrád =

Congress of Visegrád may refer to:

- Congress of Visegrád (1335)
- Congress of Visegrád (1339)
