= Polish-Czech War =

Polish-Czech War can refer to:

- one of several medieval Polish-Bohemian Wars
- Polish–Czechoslovak War of 1919
