= Polish–Bohemian War (1345–1348) =

Date	1345–1348
Location	Silesia, Lesser Poland
Result	Treaty of Namysłów

Belligerents
Kingdom of Poland; Grand Duchy of Lithuania; Kingdom of Hungary	Kingdom of Bohemia

Commanders and leaders
Casimir the Great	John of Bohemia (1345–1346); Charles IV

The Polish–Bohemian War or Polish–Czech War (Polish: Wojna polsko-czeska) was fought between the Kingdom of Bohemia under John of Bohemia and the Kingdom of Poland under Casimir III the Great between 1345 and 1348. After fighting in Silesia and Lesser Poland, the Bohemian army advanced on Silesia and Lesser Poland in 1345, including on the Polish capital of Kraków. An armistice signed later that year held until 1348, when hostilities resumed. Although Poland had a slight military advantage, the war ended with the Treaty of Namysłów signed in November 1348. No territorial changes were made. The Poles renounced their claims to Silesia, and the Bohemians their claims to the Polish throne.

== Background ==
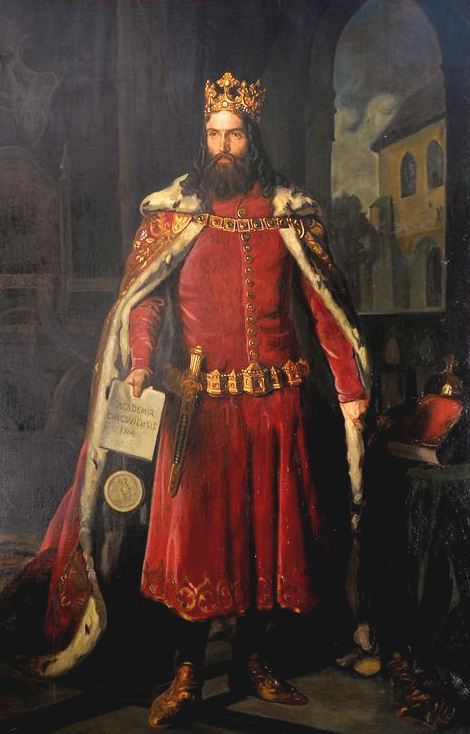
Casimir the Great by Leopold Löffler

The kingdoms of Bohemia and Poland had fought over border territories before since at least 990; in 1327, John of Bohemia raided Silesia and Lesser Poland and reached the Polish capital of Kraków. Silesia, in particular, divided into numerous Duchies of Silesia following the fragmentation of Poland, was a target for Bohemian expansion. The Polish King Casimir the Great already had acknowledged Bohemian control of Silesia in the 1335 Treaty of Trentschin. However, neither Poland nor Bohemia were satisfied with the status quo, and every few years the border would shift due to diplomatic negotiations or small military escapades.

== The war ==
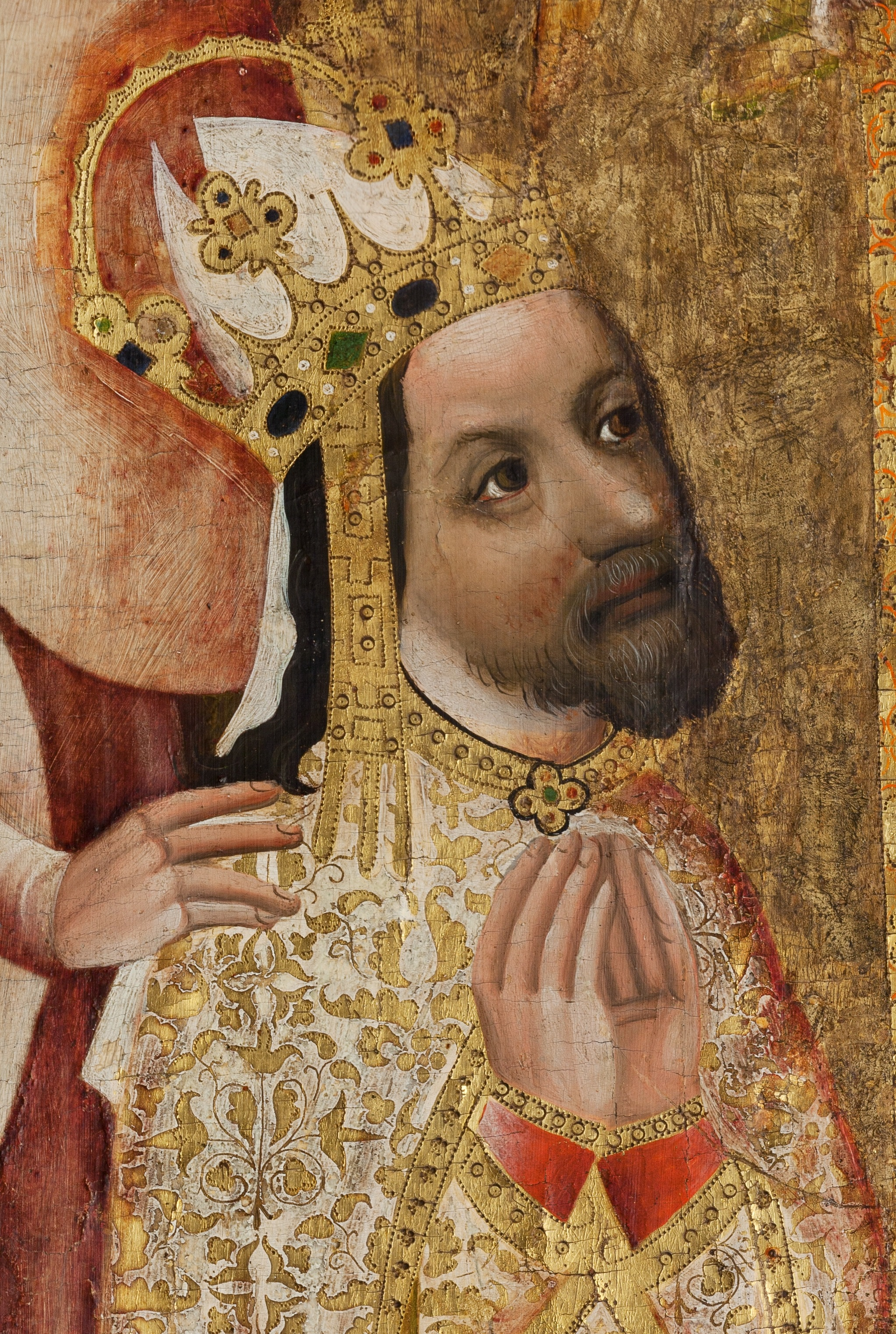
Charles IV

The immediate cause of the war was the imprisonment of Charles, son of John, by the Poles. While he was freed shortly afterwards, this gave the Bohemians a pretext to begin a more extensive military operation against Poland. The Polish army, led by the king and aided by Lithuanian units, advanced on the borderland Duchy of Troppau, and captured the towns of Pszczyna and Rybnik. However, John of Bohemia stood in the military camp near Wodzisław. Faced with a Bohemian counter-attack, Poles retreated to Kraków. The Bohemian army unsuccessfully besieged Kraków (around 12 to 20 July 1345; siege of Kraków (1345)), and suffered further defeats at the Battle of Lelów and the Battle of Pogoń. An armistice was signed later that year, and soon the Bohemians found themselves in a much stronger position, as Charles was elected the Holy Roman Emperor in 1346.

Fighting was renewed in spring/summer of 1348, with engagements near Wrocław (Breslau). Although the engagements were not conclusive, and even favorable to the Polish side, the two sides decided to settle the issue through diplomacy, to focus on other threats (such as, for Poland, that of the Teutonic Knights).

== Aftermath ==
The war ended with the Treaty of Namysłów signed on 22 November 1348 in which the Poles de facto renounced their claims to Silesia (the documents do not contain a clear statement to that effect but have been interpreted in such a way by later historians, since it left most of Silesia under de jure control of Bohemians), and the Bohemians renounced their claims to the Polish throne. No territorial changes occurred. This cemented Bohemian control over most of Silesia.
