= Visegrád, Hungary =

Town in central Hungary

Visegrád
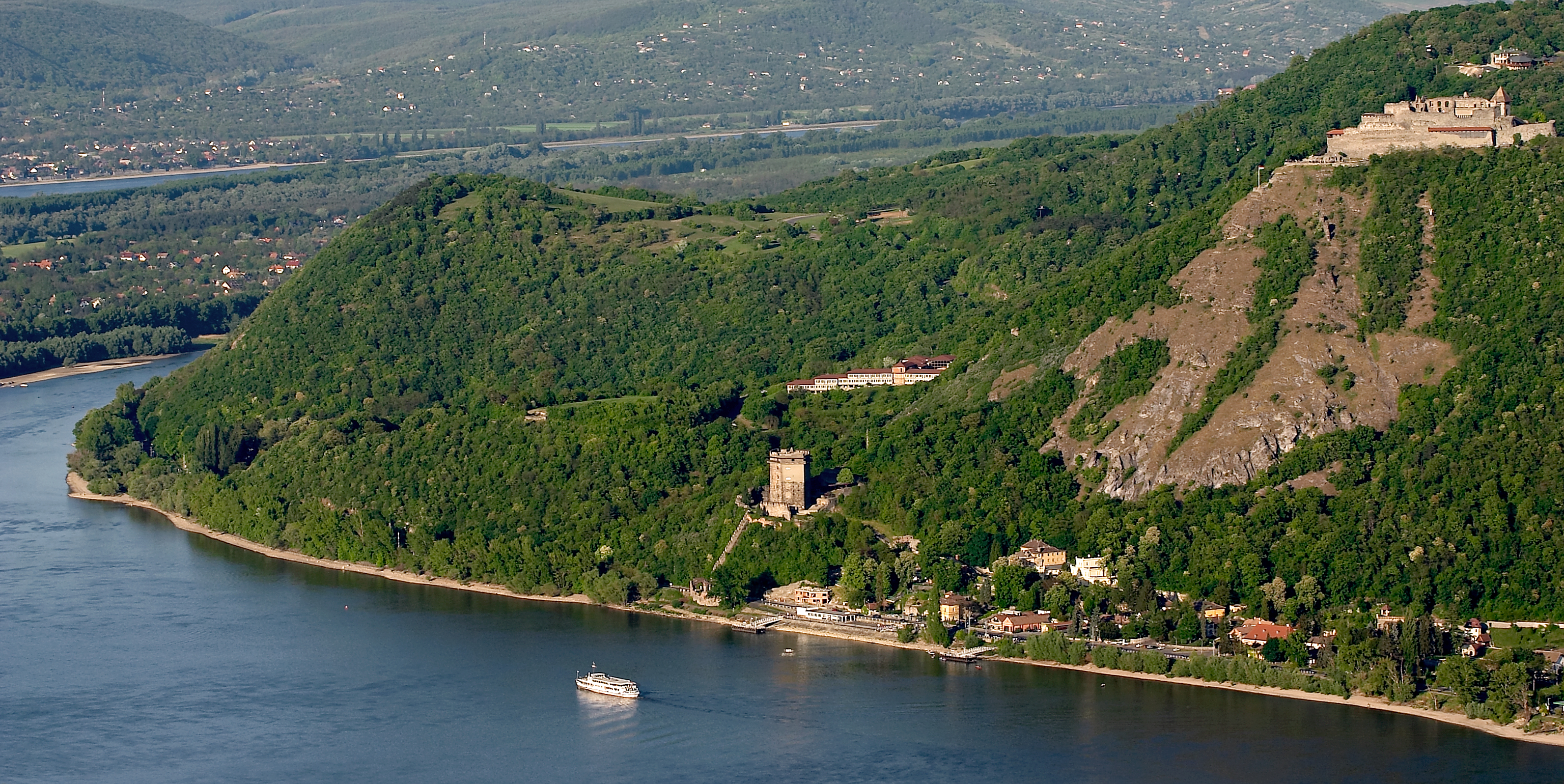
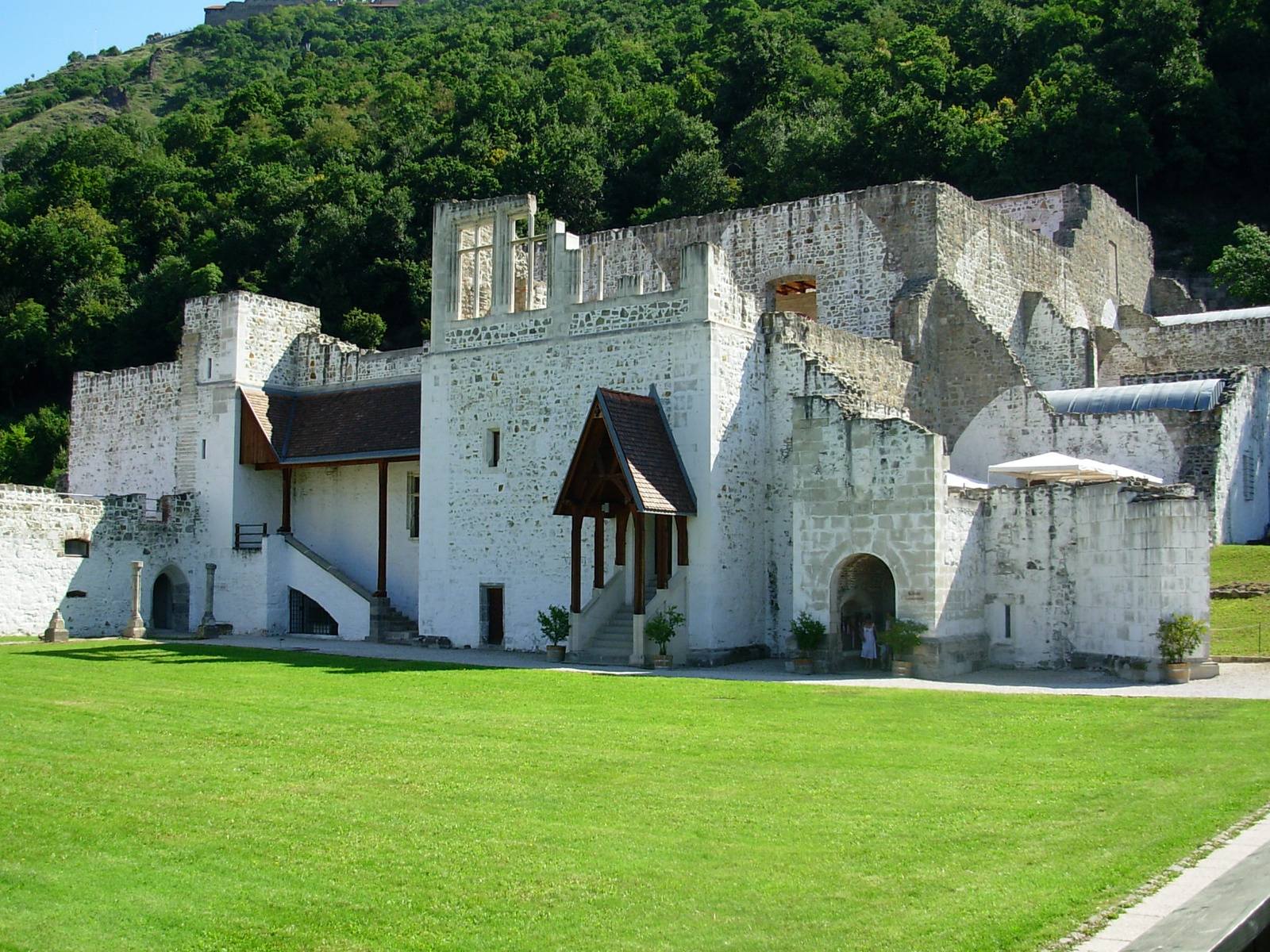
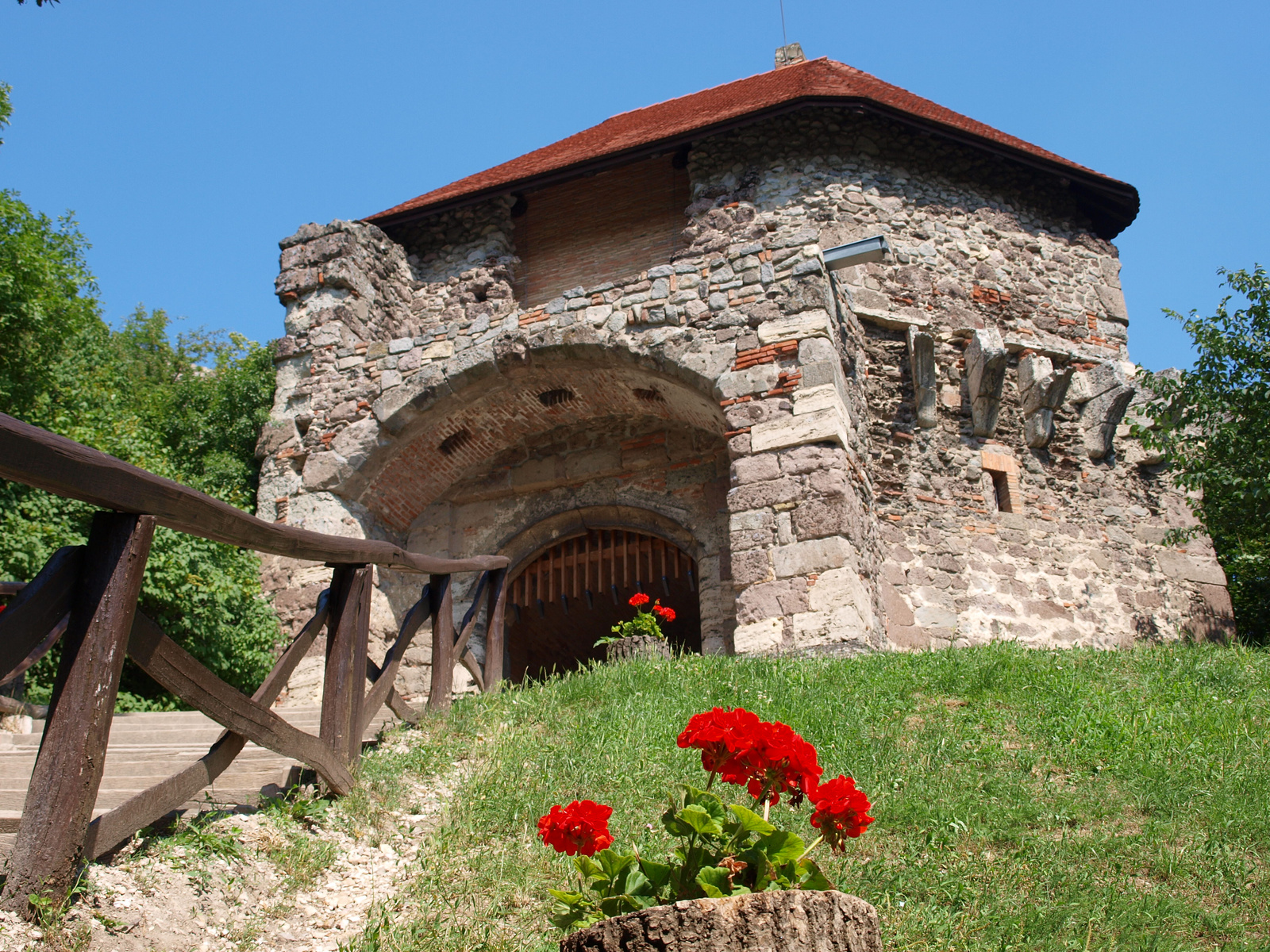
- Descending, from top: the city in the Danube Bend, ruins of the Royal Palace, gate of the Citadel

- Flag Coat of arms

- Location of Visegrád Visegrád (Hungary) Visegrád (Europe)
- Coordinates: 47.78483°N 18.97367°E
- Country: Hungary
- Region: Central Hungary
- County: Pest
- District: Szentendre District
- Founded: 1009

Area
  - Total: 33.27 km^{2} (12.85 sq mi)
- Elevation: 100 m (330 ft)

Population (2018)
  - Total: 1,841
  - Density: 55.34/km^{2} (143.3/sq mi)
- Time zone: UTC+1 (CET)
  - Summer (DST): UTC+2 (CEST)
- Postal code: 2025
- Area code: 26

Visegrád (Hungarian: [ˈviʃɛɡraːd]; German: Plintenburg; Slovak: Vyšehrad) is a castle town in Pest County, Hungary. It is north of Budapest on the right bank of the Danube in the Danube Bend. It had a population of 1,864 in 2010. The town is the site of the remains of the Early Renaissance summer palace of King Matthias Corvinus of Hungary and a medieval citadel. The town was also the site of a meeting on 15 February 1991 between the President of the Czech and Slovak Federative Republic, Václav Havel, the President of the Republic of Poland, Lech Wałęsa, and the Prime Minister of the Republic of Hungary, József Antall which founded the titular Visegrád group.

== Etymology ==
The name Visegrád is of Slavic origin, meaning 'acropolis', literally 'upper castle' (a castle with a privileged position) or 'upper settlement'. In modern Slovak and Czech, the name is Vyšehrad.

Visegrád Castle is called Fellegvár (literally, 'citadel') in Hungarian, In German, the town is called Plintenburg. A story claims that the German name Plintenburg or Blendenburg comes from the beautiful view that one has from the castle because a person is "blinded" or "dazzled" by this view.

== History ==
Visegrád was first mentioned in 1009 as a county town and the chief town of an archdeaconry. After the destructive Mongol invasion of Europe in 1242, the town was rebuilt in a slightly different location to the south. King Charles I of Hungary made Visegrád the royal seat of Hungary in 1325. At the same time, his diplomat Stephen Sáfár was appointed castellan.

In 1335, Charles hosted at Visegrád a two-month congress with the Bohemian king, John of Luxembourg, and the Polish king, Casimir III. It was crucial in creating a peace between the three kingdoms and securing an alliance between Poland and Hungary against Habsburg Austria. Another congress followed in 1339.

Sigismund, Holy Roman Emperor and King of Hungary and Croatia in personal union with Hungary, moved the royal seat to Buda between 1405 and 1408. King Matthias Corvinus (1443–1490), King of Hungary, used Visegrád as a country residence.

Visegrád lost importance after the partition of the Kingdom of Hungary following the Battle of Mohács in 1526. It was captured by the Ottomans under Suleiman the Magnificent in 1529. In 1532, King Zápolya besieged Visegrád and took it. In 1540, after the death of Zápolya, Habsburg general Leonhard Fels took the city, as well as Vác, Pest, Tata and Székesfehérvár. Because the city threatened the lines of communication between Buda and Esztergom, Yahyapaşaoğlu Mehmed Paşa of Buda took it in 1544 (possibly April 23, before May 10). It was captured by papal troops under Giovanni Francesco Aldobrandini, nephew of pope Clement VIII, soon after the successful siege of Esztergom in 1595.

In February 1991, the leading politicians of Hungary, Czechoslovakia, and Poland met here to form a periodical forum, the Visegrád Group, with an intentional allusion to the meeting centuries earlier in 1335.

Visegrád was granted town privileges again in 2000.

== Monuments ==
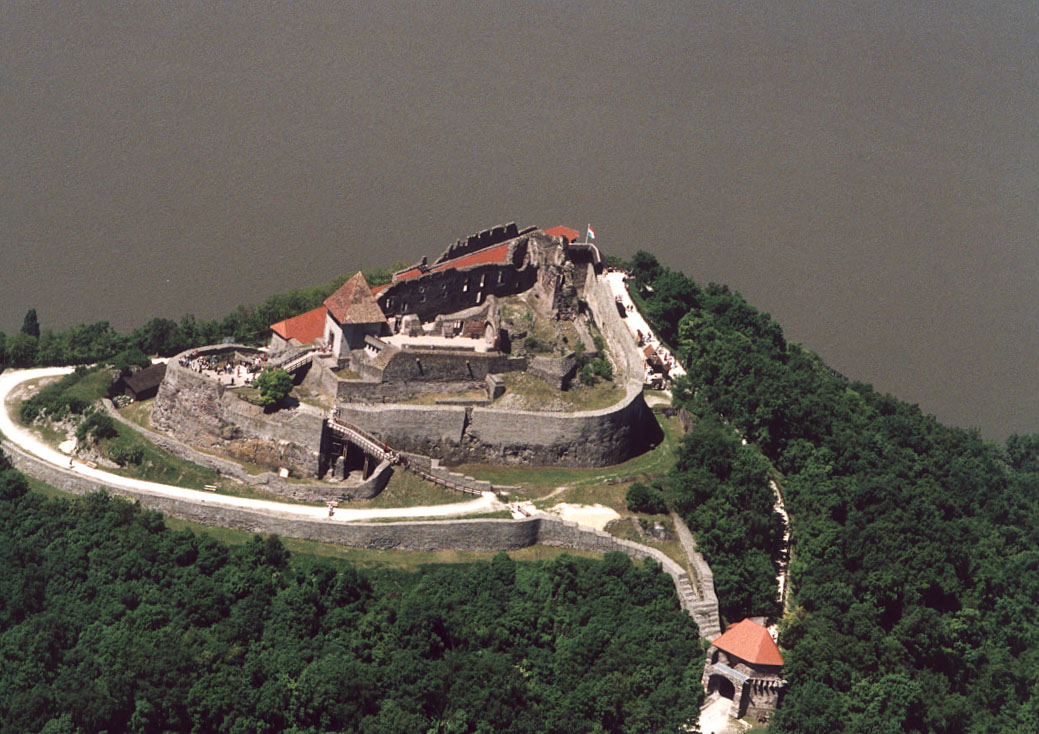
Visegrád Castle

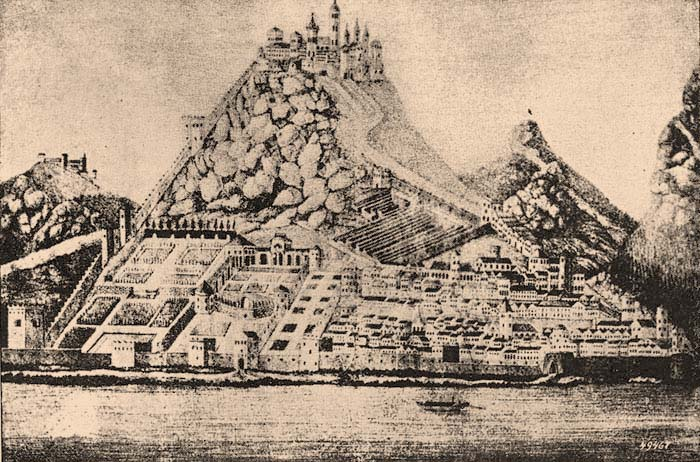
The castle at the time of King Matthias' reign

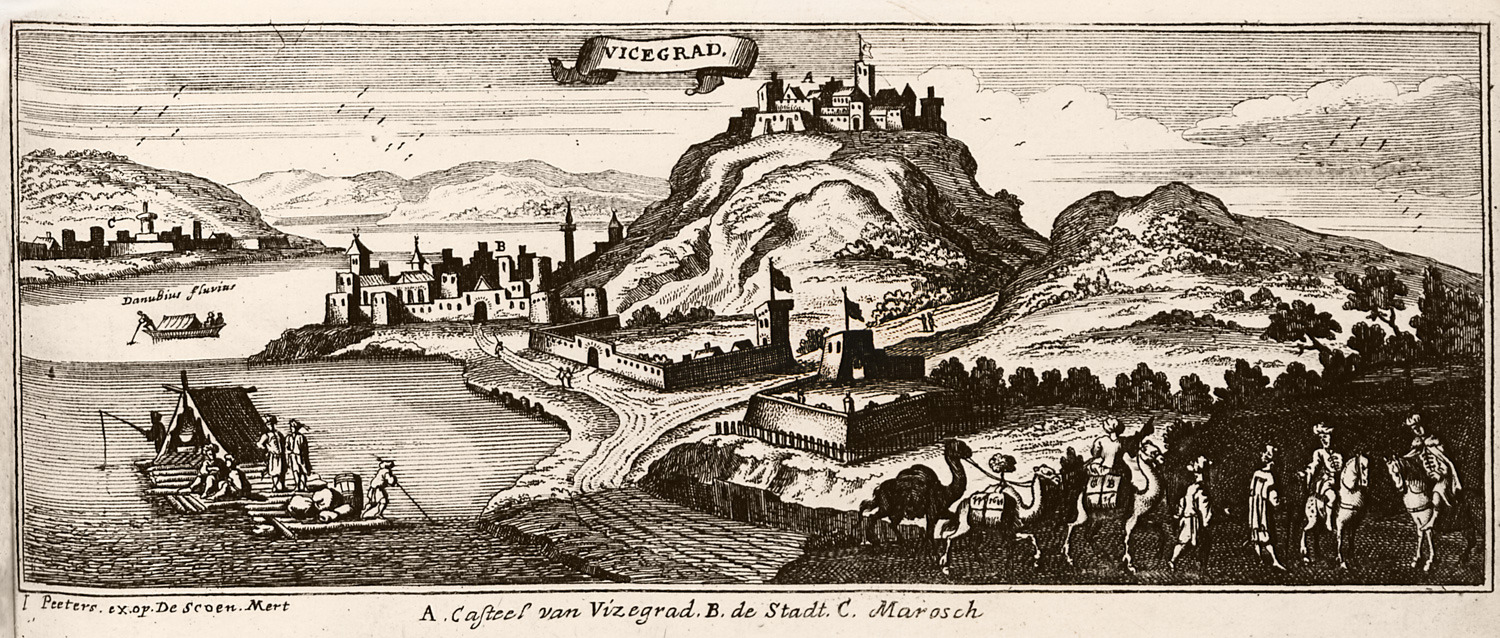
Visegrád in 1686 by Gaspar Bouttats

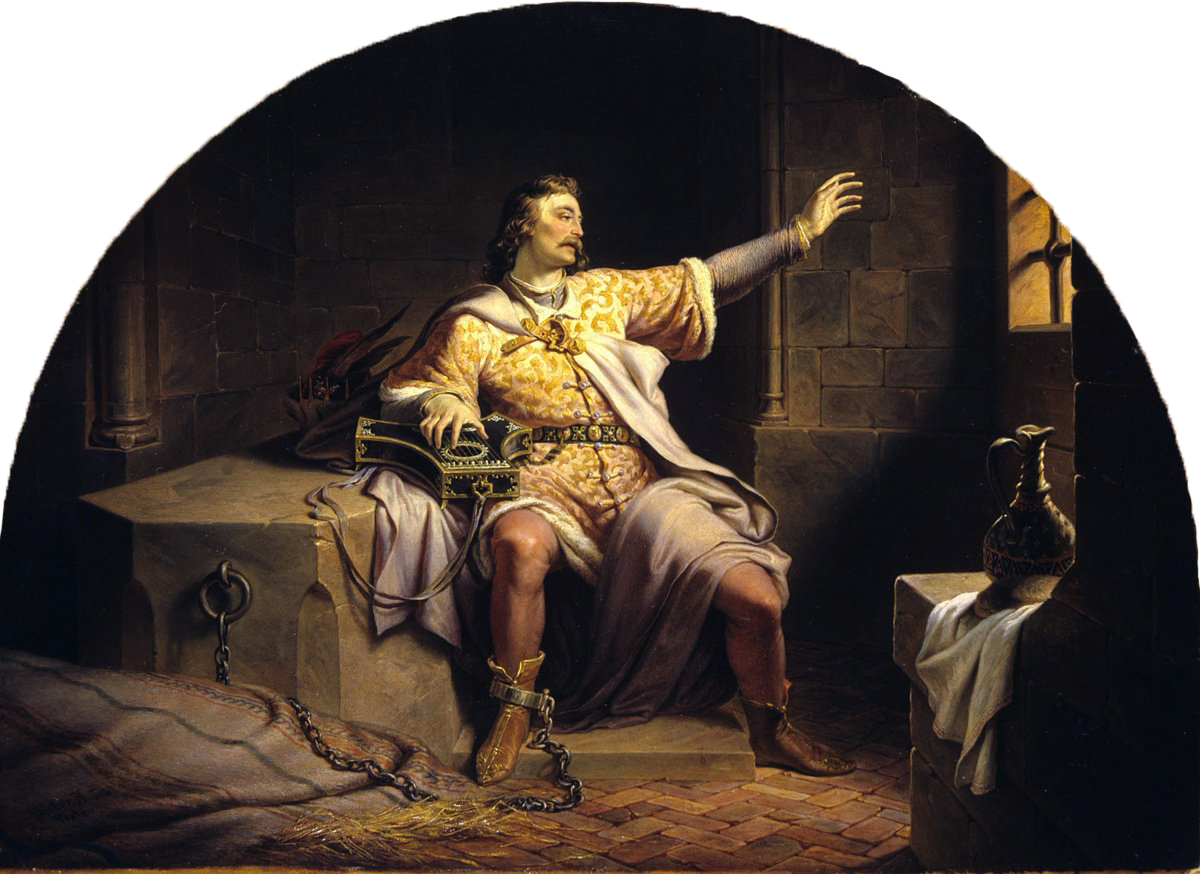
King Solomon in the Solomon Tower in Visegrád, by Henrik Weber

=== Upper Castle ===
After the Mongol invasion, King Béla IV of Hungary and his wife had a new fortification system constructed in the 1240s and 1250s near the one destroyed earlier. The first part of the new system was the Upper Castle on top of a high hill. The castle was laid out on a triangular ground plan and had three towers at its corners. In the 14th century, at the time of the Angevin kings of Hungary, the castle became a royal residence and was enlarged with a new curtain wall and palace buildings.

Around 1400 King Sigismund had a third curtain wall constructed and enlarged the palace buildings. At the end of the 15th century, King Matthias Corvinus had the interior renovated. The Upper Castle also served for the safekeeping of the Hungarian royal insignia between the 14th century and 1526. In 1544 Visegrád was occupied by the Ottoman Empire, and, apart from a short period in 1595–1605, it remained in Turkish hands until 1685. The castle was seriously damaged by the Turks and was never used afterwards.

The castle is now open to the public to visit.

=== Lower Castle ===
The Lower Castle is the part of the fortification system that connects the Upper Castle with the Danube. In its centre rises the Solomon Tower, a large, hexagonal residential tower dating from the 13th century. In the 14th century, new curtain walls were built around the tower. During a Turkish raid in 1544, the southern part of the tower collapsed. Its renovation began only in the 1870s and was finished in the 1960s.

At present, the Tower houses exhibitions installed by the King Matthias Museum (Mátyás Király Múzeum) of Visegrád. The exhibitions present the reconstructed Gothic fountains from the Royal Palace, Renaissance sculpture in Visegrád, and the history of Visegrád.

=== Royal Palace ===
The first royal house on this site was built by King Charles I of Hungary after 1325. In the second half of the 14th century, this was enlarged into a palace by his son, King Louis I of Hungary.

In the last third of the 14th century, King Louis and his successor Sigismund of Luxembourg had the majority of the earlier buildings dismantled and created a new, sumptuous palace complex, the extensive ruins of which are still visible today. The palace complex was laid out on a square ground plan measuring 123 x 123 m. A garden adjoined to it from the north and a Franciscan friary, founded by King Sigismund in 1424, from the south. In the time of Louis I and Sigismund, the palace was the official residence of the kings of Hungary until about 1405–08.

Between 1477 and 1484 Matthias Corvinus had the palace complex reconstructed in late Gothic style. The Italian Renaissance architectural style was used for decoration, the first time the style appeared in Europe outside Italy. After the Ottoman Turks' siege in 1544, the palace fell into ruins. By the 18th century it was completely covered by earth. Its excavation began in 1934 and continues today.

The reconstructed royal residence building is open to the public and houses exhibitions on the history of the palace and reconstructed historical interiors.

=== Sibrik Hill ===
The ruins of this military camp can be seen outside Visegrád, to the north, on a hill that overlooks the Danube. The camp has a triangular ground plan. It was built in the first half of the 4th century as one of the important fortifications along the limes, the frontier of the Roman Empire. Its praetorium (the commander's building) was constructed at the end of the 4th century. In the early 5th century, the Roman army abandoned the military camp.

In the 10th and 11th centuries, the fortification, rebuilt as a castle, became a regional centre of the recently formed Hungarian state. "Visegrád" appears for the first time as the name of this regional centre (1009). The fortification was finally destroyed in 1242 by the Mongol invasion of Europe.

== Twin towns – sister cities ==
Visegrád is twinned with:

- Lanciano, Italy
- Obergünzburg, Germany

== Gallery ==
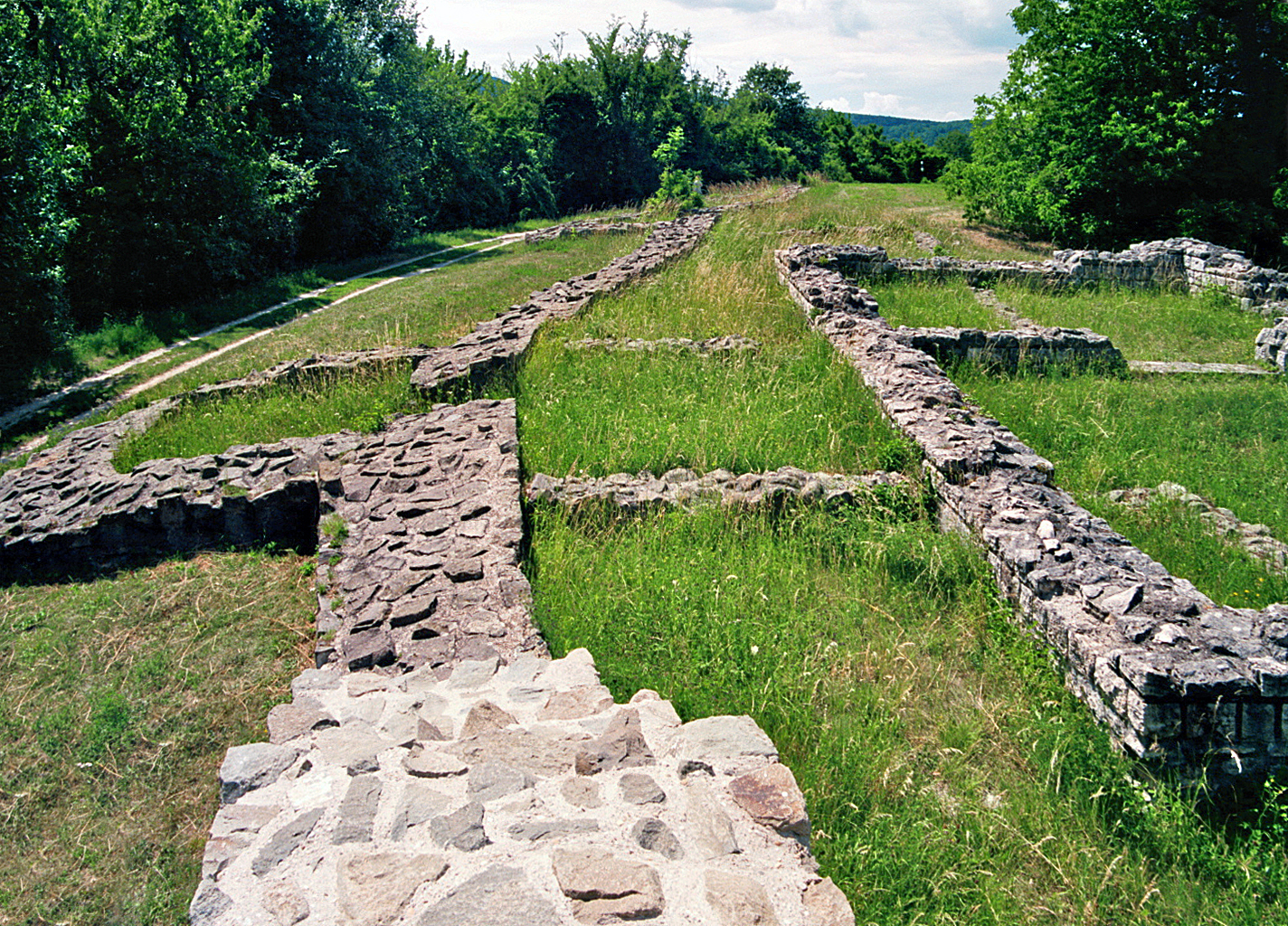
Sibrik Hill

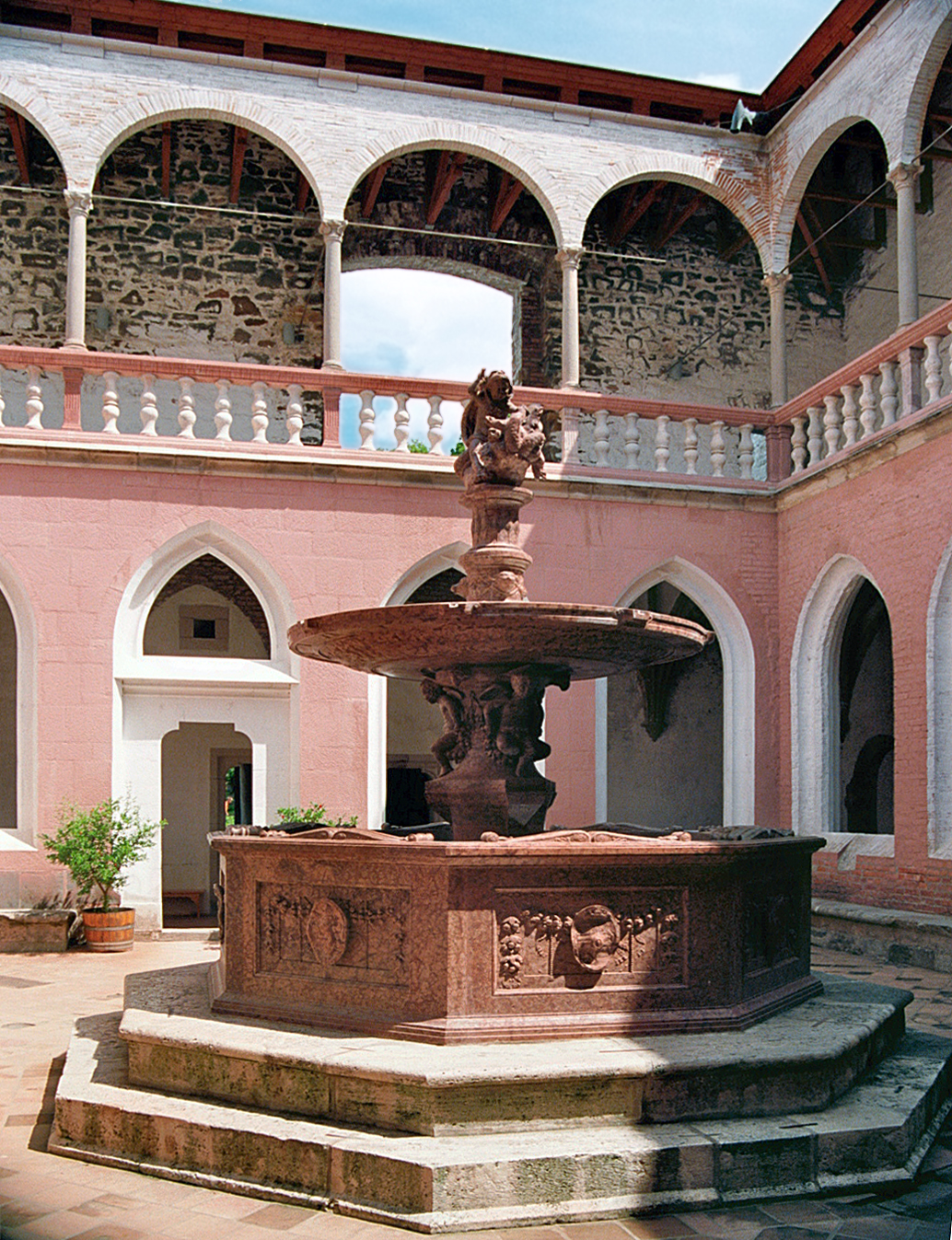
Royal Palace, Matthias fountain

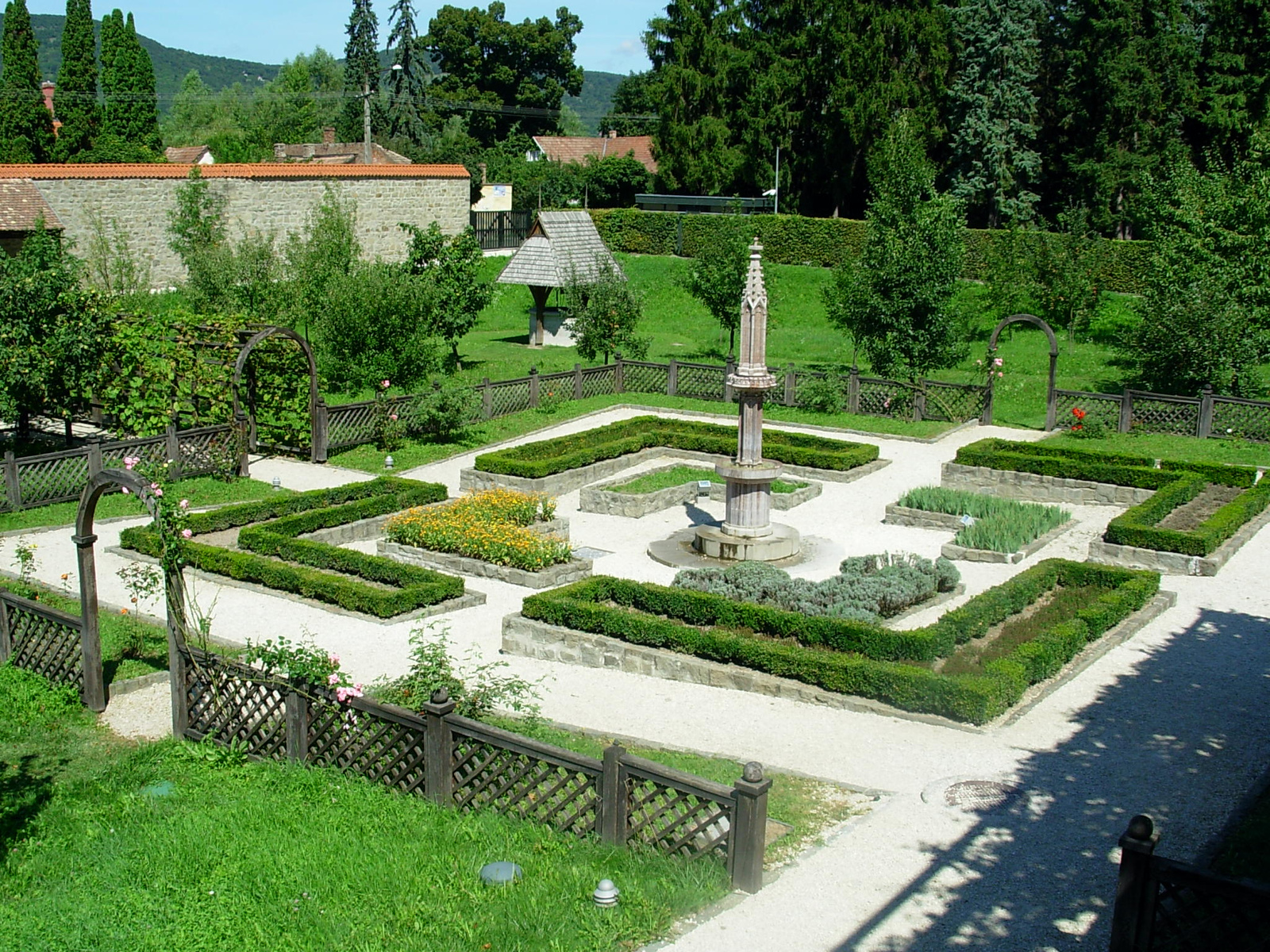
Garden of the Royal Palace

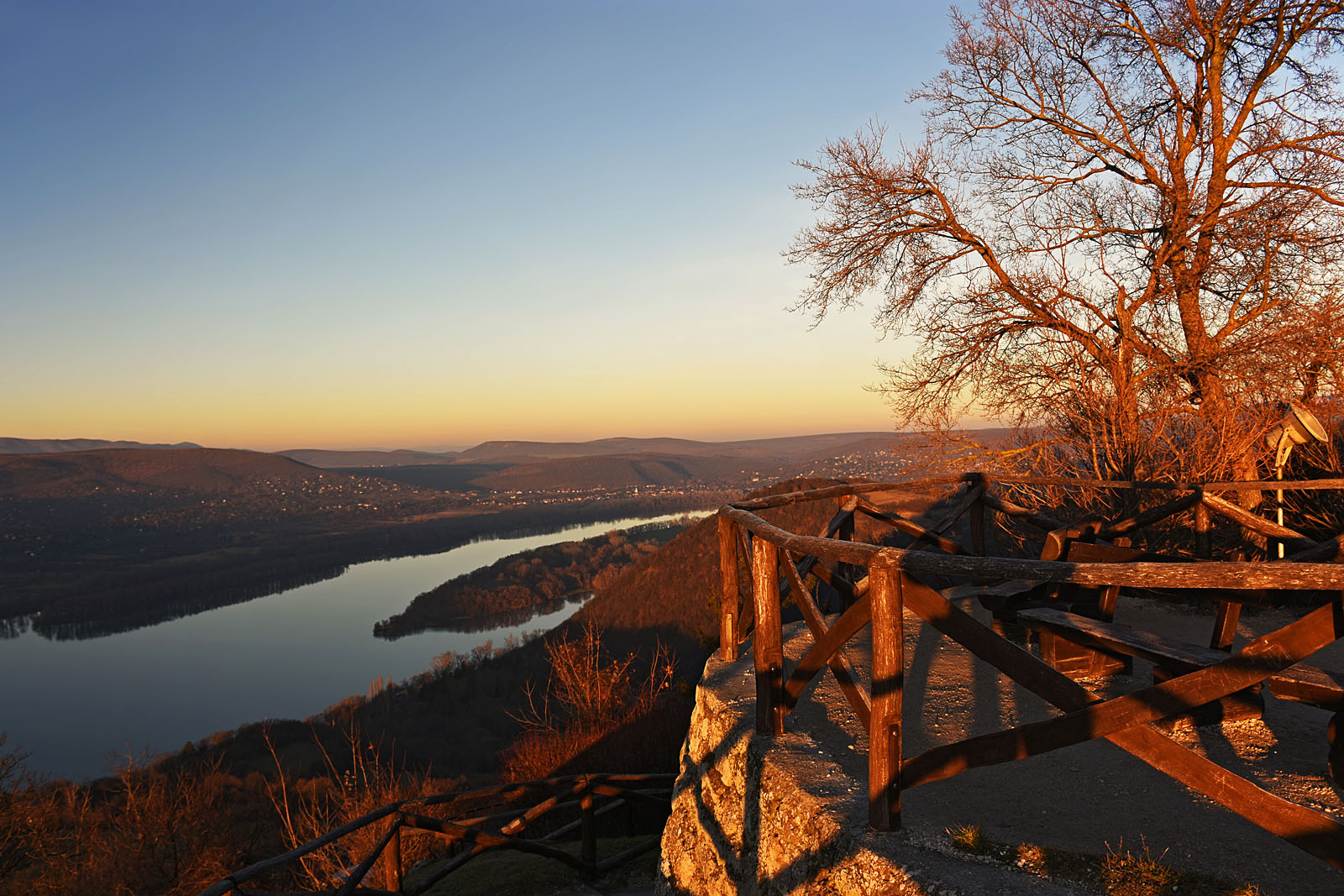
Visegrád castle panorama

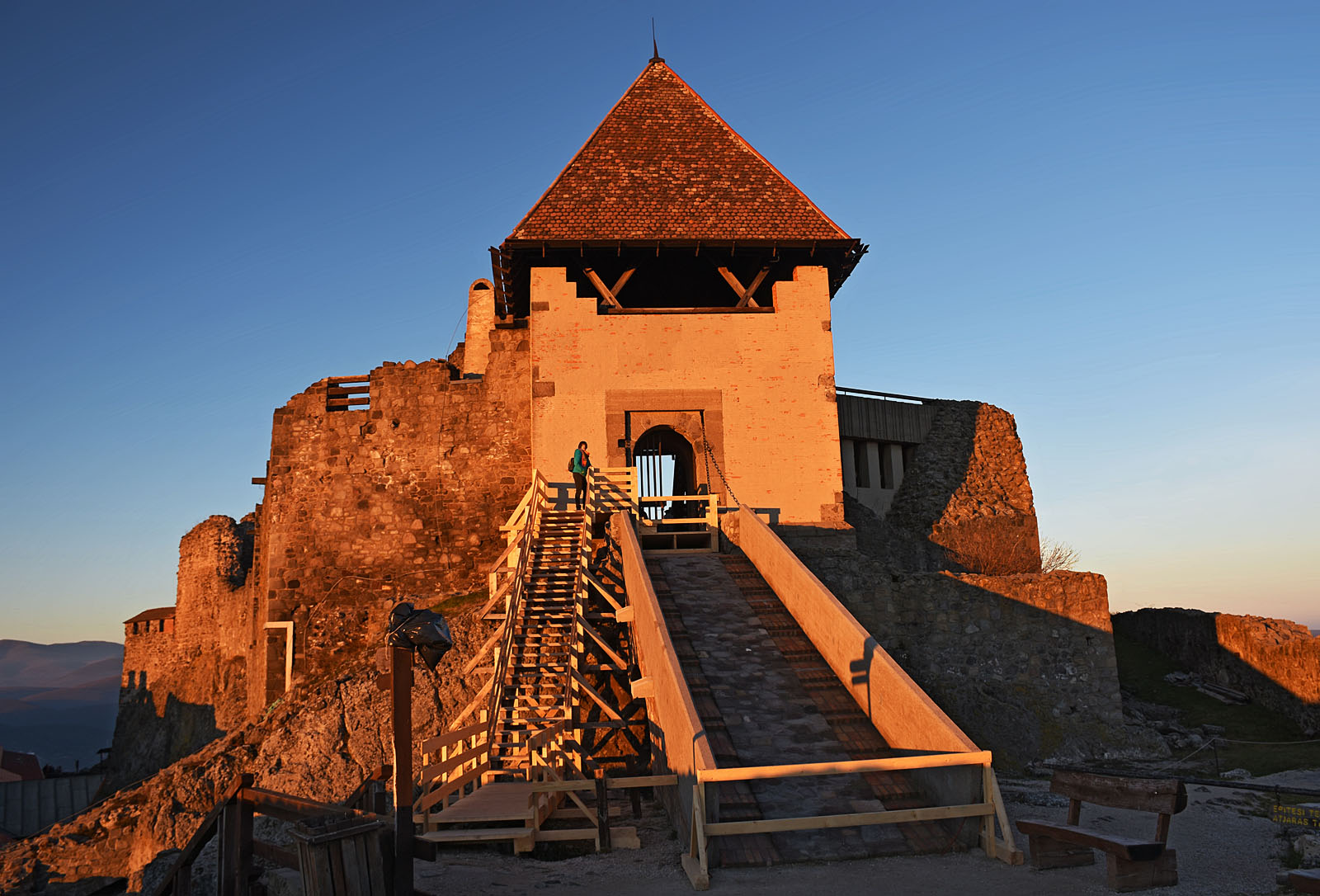
Visegrád castle

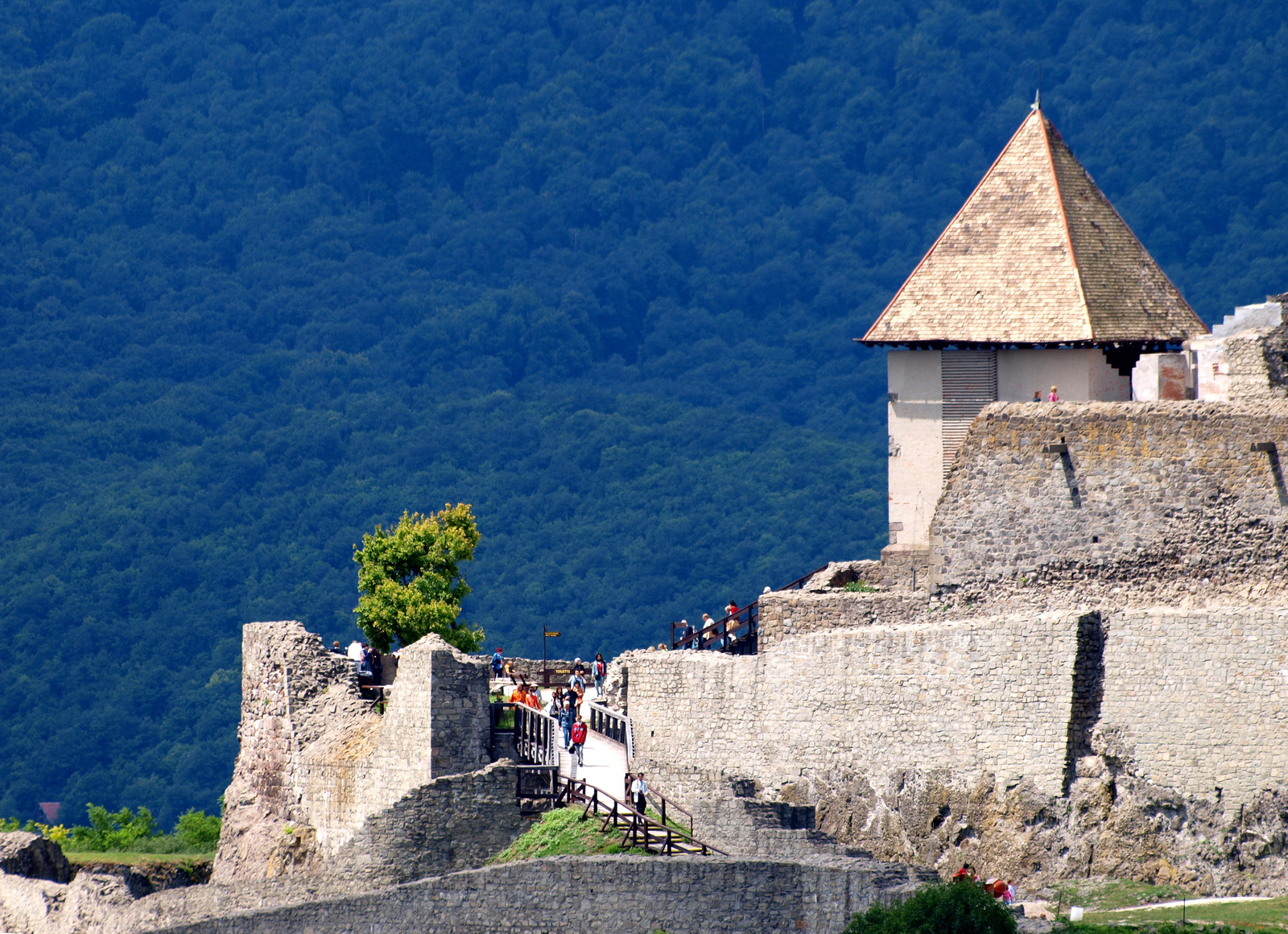
Visegrád castle

== See also ==
- Višegrad, a town in Bosnia and Herzegovina
- Vyshhorod, a city in Ukraine
- Vyšehrad, a castle in Czech Republic
- Wyszogród, a town in Poland
