= Treaty of Namysłów =

1348 peace treaty between Poland and Bohemia

Pokój namysłowski (in Polish)
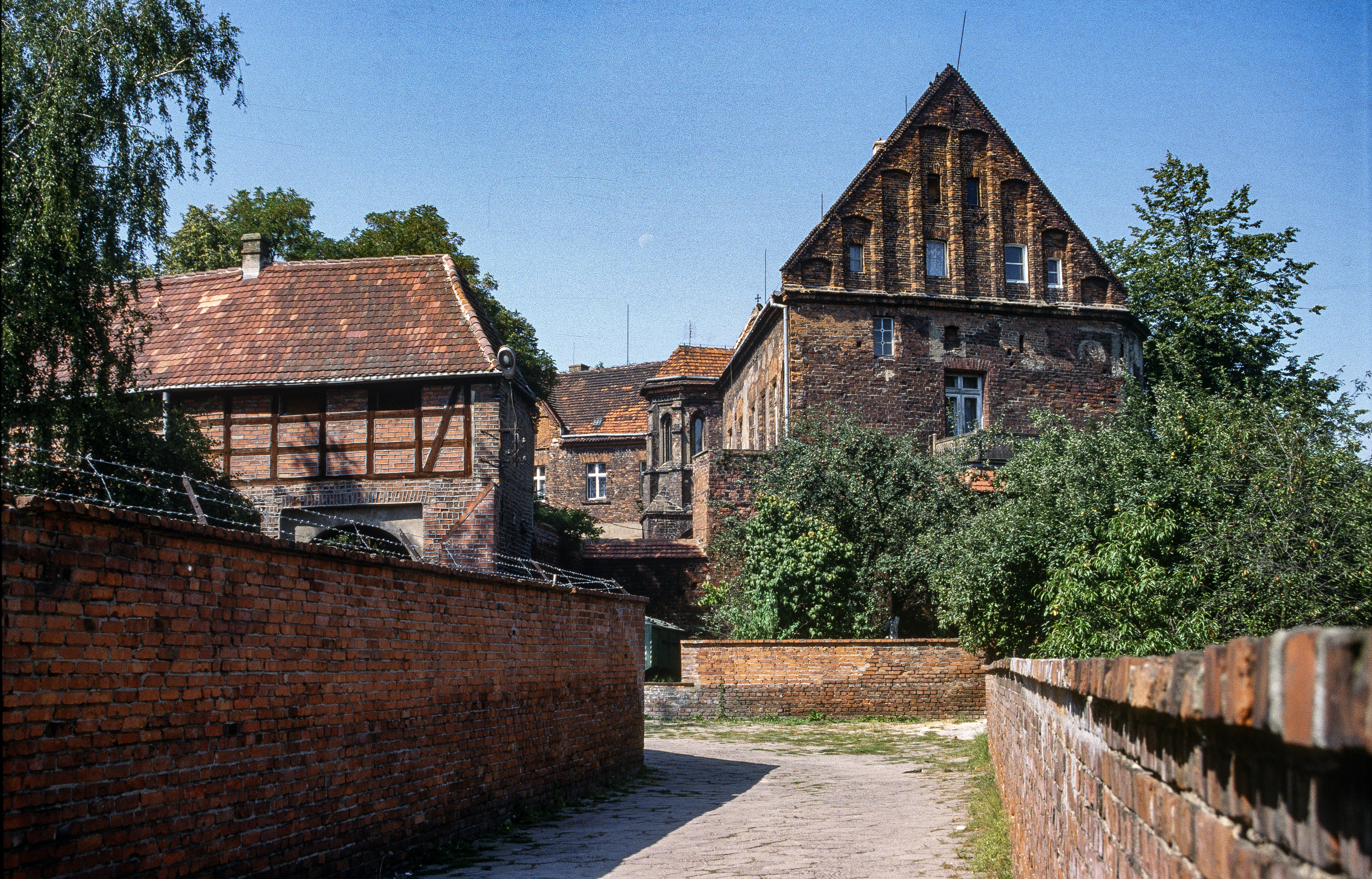
- Namysłów Castle
- Type: Peace treaty
- Signed: November 22, 1348
- Location: Namysłów, Silesia
- Signatories: Poland; Bohemia

The Treaty of Namslau or Namysłów, also known as the Peace of Namslau/Namysłów, was a peace treaty between King Charles IV of Bohemia and King Casimir III of Poland. It was signed at Namysłów (German: Namslau) in Silesia on November 22, 1348 after the Polish-Bohemian War of 1345–1348.

Since the restoration of a Polish kingdom under Przemysł II in 1295, the Crown had again disputed sovereignty over the many Duchies of Silesia with the Kingdom of Bohemia. As King Wenceslaus II of Bohemia had been crowned Polish king in 1300, his successors from the House of Luxembourg, Bohemian rulers since 1310, also claimed the Polish Crown as their heritage. They took advantage of the tensions within the Piast dynasty and the fragmentation of the former Duchy of Silesia north of the Bohemian borders. By promises as well as by pressure, with the exception of Duke Bolko II the Small, an increasing number of the Silesian Piasts had recognized the sovereignty of Charles' father and predecessor, King John of Bohemia, from 1327 to 1335.

When King Casimir III succeeded his father Władysław I the Elbow-high in 1333, he found the Polish borders threatened not only by the Bohemian kingdom, but also by the Margraves of Brandenburg, who had extended their territory further eastwards into the Neumark region, and foremost by the State of the Teutonic Order, whose plans for expansion had sparked the Polish–Teutonic War (1326–1332) over Pomerelia, Kuyavia and the Dobrzyń Land. In view of the hostile superiority, the Polish king sought for peaceful conflict resolutions: he concluded the Treaty of Trentschin in 1335, renouncing the suzerainty over Silesia, and in 1343 signed the Treaty of Kalisz with the Teutonic Order, which sealed the loss of Pomerelia.

After tensions had settled, Casimir acted cleverly in the rising conflict between the Luxembourgs and the Imperial House of Wittelsbach around the heritage of Countess Margaret of Tyrol. He was able to convert Emperor Louis IV to his column and occupied several Silesian territories south of the Polish border, including the castle of Namysłów. However, the Luxembourgs gained the upper hand, when King John's son Charles IV was elected King of the Romans in 1346. Casimir III had to sign the peace treaty at Namysłów, which affirmed the previous Treaty of Trentschin ratified at Kraków (1339) and Prague (1341). In the treaty, Casimir again renounced all Polish claims on Silesia, in return for Charles waiving all Bohemian claims on the Polish throne. After the 1368 death of Duke Bolko II, all of Silesia passed to the Lands of the Bohemian Crown.

== See also ==
- Treaty of Trentschin
- History of Silesia
- Congress of Visegrád (1335)
