= Polish-Bohemian War =

Polish-Bohemian War can refer to:

- Polish-Bohemian War (990)
- Polish-Bohemian War (1038)
- Polish-Bohemian War (1345–1348)

== See also ==
- Polish–Czechoslovak War
