= Treaty of Trentschin =

1335 treaty between Poland and Bohemia

Trenčínská smlouva (cs) Układ w Trenczynie (pl) Trencséni megegyezés (hu)
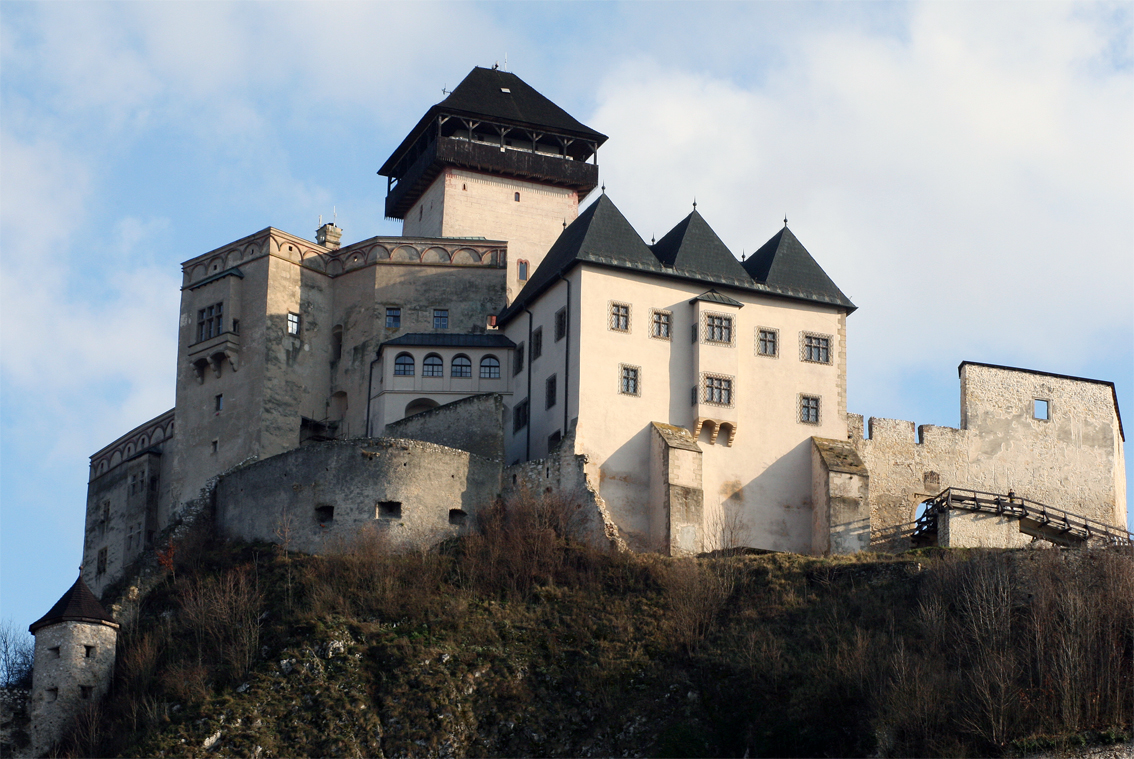
- Trenčín Castle
- Signed: 24 August 1335
- Location: Trencsén Castle, Hungary
- Effective: 9 February 1339
- Condition: Ratification by King Casimir III
- Signatories: Poland; Bohemia; Hungary

The Treaty of Trentschin was concluded on 24 August 1335 between King Casimir III of Poland and King John of Bohemia together with his son Margrave Charles IV. The agreement was reached by the agency of Casimir's brother-in-law King Charles I of Hungary and signed at Trentschin Castle in the Kingdom of Hungary (present-day Trenčín, Slovakia). It initiated the transfer of suzerainty over the former Polish province of Silesia to the Kingdom of Bohemia, whereafter the Duchies of Silesia were incorporated into the Bohemian Crown and thus became part of the Holy Roman Empire. Following the integration of this treaty, the three kingdoms of Bohemia, Hungary, and Poland met at the First Congress of Visegrad later in 1335 to further discuss the division of land. This congress also made the treaty official.

== Prelude ==
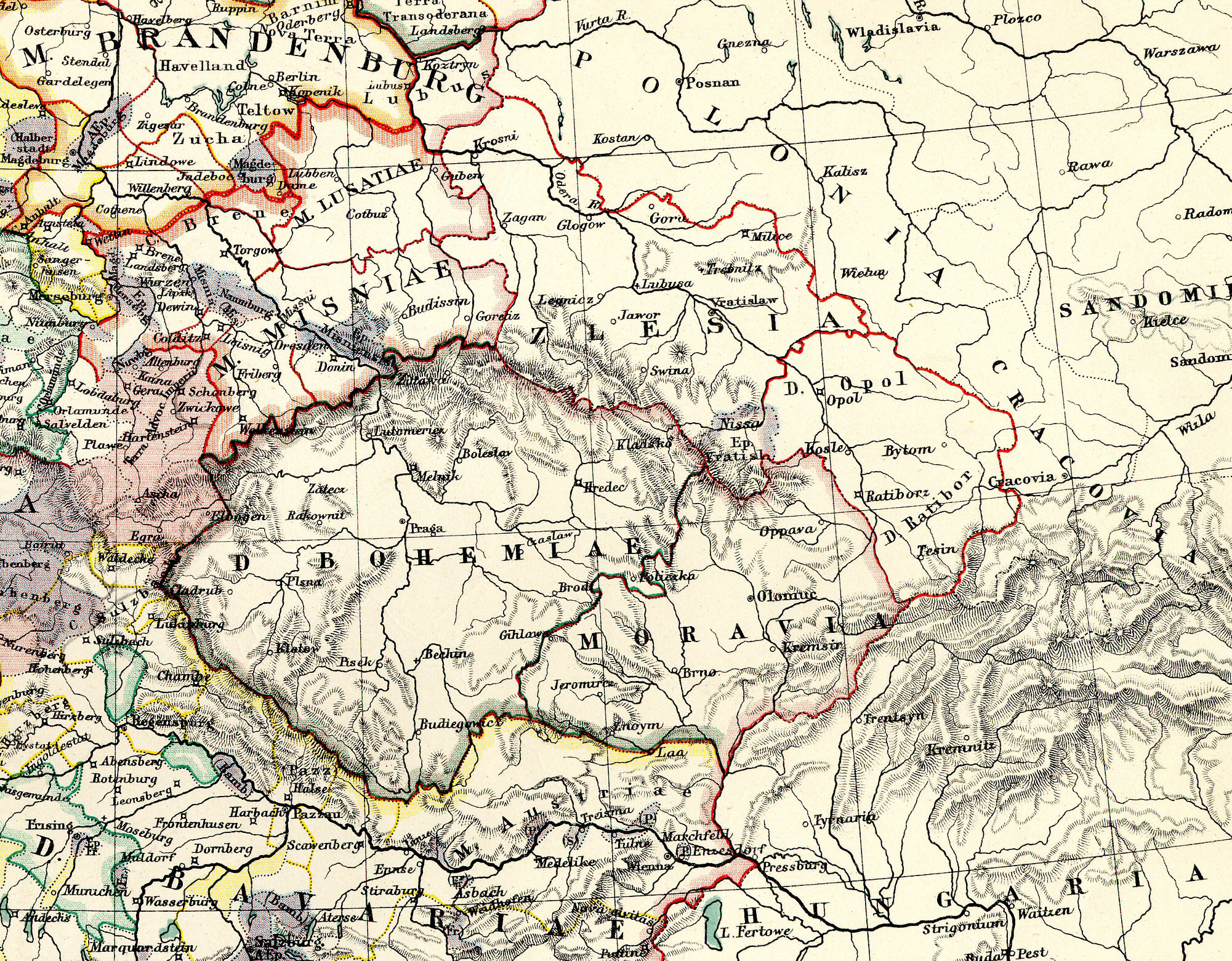
Bohemia and Silesia 1138—1254

Shortly before his death in 992, Mieszko I, the first ruler of Poland, had conquered the Silesian region that stretched along the common border. At Pentecost 1137, Duke Soběslav I of Bohemia officially renounced the lands in favour of Piast duke Bolesław III Wrymouth. He was urged by Emperor Lothair III. Bolesław died the next year and in his testament bequested the newly established Duchy of Silesia to his eldest son Władysław II. Władysław, however, was expelled by his younger half-brothers and had to seek help from the Holy Roman Emperor. That was the beginning of the gradual alienation of Władysław. The rule of Duke Bolesław I over Silesia was restored under pressure from Emperor Frederick Barbarossa in 1163. Bolesław's son Henry the Bearded became High Duke of Poland in 1232. The marriage of his successor Duke Henry II the Pious with Anne of Bohemia, daughter of King Ottokar I, strengthened the ties between the Silesian Piasts and the Bohemian Přemyslid dynasty. After Henry's death during the 1241 Battle of Legnica, Silesia split up into numerous petty states under his descendants.

In 1280 Duke Henry IV of Wrocław, induced by his ambition to gain the Polish Seniorate Province of Cracow, paid homage to King Rudolf I of Germany and was able to succeed Leszek II the Black as Polish high duke in 1288. Because the Polish sovereignty was weakening, the occasion arose for the Přemyslids to, once again, expand their sphere of influence into Silesia. In 1289 King Wenceslaus II of Bohemia made Duke Casimir of Bytom his vassal. In the renewed struggle over the Polish Seniorate Province upon the sudden death of Duke Henry IV in 1290, King Wenceslaus II of Bohemia forged an alliance with Casimir's brother Bolko I of Opole against the rivaling Polish Piasts Władysław I the Elbow-high and Przemysł II, who finally had to cede Cracow to the Bohemian king one year later. King Wenceslaus failed at first to gain Polish regality as Przemysł II became High Duke and was crowned in 1295 by Archbishop Jakub Świnka of Gniezno. That made Przemysł II the first Polish king after the deposition of Bolesław II the Bold in 1079. When Przemysł II was killed in 1296, Wenceslaus II again took the chance to assume the title of a High Duke. He married Przemysł's daughter Elisabeth Richeza and was finally crowned Polish king by Archbishop Jakub Świnka in 1300.

In 1305 King Wenceslaus II died and his son Wenceslaus III, the last Přemyslid ruler, was murdered the following year. The Polish sovereignty turned to the Piast dynasty again when Władysław I, the elbow-high, began to unite the kingdom under his rule. Wenceslaus' successors in Bohemia, Henry of Carinthia and Rudolph of Austria also claimed the title of a Polish king but could not prevail. While Władysław was crowned king in 1320, the Bohemian aspirations to power rose again in 1310. Count John of Luxembourg, the eldest son of King Henry VII of Germany, married the Přemyslid princess Elizabeth, taking over the power in Prague and also the claims to the Polish throne. Though he failed to succeed his father as King of the Romans, he had more Silesian dukes swore an oath of allegiance to him against the resistance of King Władysław. In 1327 he vassalized the dukes of Wrocław and Opole, followed by the dukes of Legnica, Żagań, Oleśnica, Ścinawa and Brzeg in 1329. The tensions intensified when King John campaigned and annexed the Silesian Duchy of Głogów in 1331. He began to interfere in the Polish-Teutonic War that broke out in Kuyavia and Dobrzyń Land in the aftermath of the 1308 takeover of Gdańsk.

== Establishing the Three Kingdoms ==
When looking at the history preceding the Treaty of Trencin, it lines up with the history of the three kingdoms involved in the signing of the treaty. The issues addressed and remedied in the treaty all directly relate to the kingdoms themselves. In order to have a better understanding of what each kingdom was experiencing, it is vital to look back at their individual histories.

=== Hungary ===
It is well known that the vast majority of Europe in the Middle Ages identified with some denomination of either Christianity or a religious belief. In the case of the Hungarians, they remained Pagan for quite a long time. In the late 9th century, these "Pagan Hungarians" were known for their consistent attacks upon different kingdoms. Most notably among these were the Eastern Franks. According to the Annales Bertiniani from 862, the Eastern Frankish kingdom was raided by a group of people known as the Ungri. To the knowledge of many historians, this is the first recorded instance of Hungarian action in Western texts. This conflict with the Frankish people continued in 881 when the Hungarians allied with Moravian ruler Svatopluk in a series of two battles against the Franks. However, following a change of heart in 892, Franks and Hungarians would partner to defeat Svatopluk, a former ally of Hungary.

After a long period of raids and battles led against a number of kingdoms, Hungarians decided to pursue a greater purpose. Starting in 894, the Hungarian people would come to occupy the Carpathian basin. This occupation is better known as "The Conquest". Unfortunately, no existing sources contain reliable accounts of The Conquest. Using pieces of novelistic speculation from a former notary of King Bela III (1172 - 1196), historians have been able to form an educated hypothesis about the events in the Carpathian basin. However, there has been an interpretation compiled by a number of historians that starts with the Bulgaro-Frankish alliance in 892. This was short lived when Khan Simeon took the throne of Bulgaria in 893, ending the alliance. Bulgaria found new allies in the form of the Moravian kingdom the same year. Hungarians are recorded as the attackers of both the Moravians and Bulgarians. This holds great historical significance as the first large-scale attack led by Hungarians in Western Europe.

In the many years following the occupation of the Carpathian basin, the kingdom of Hungary underwent several societal changes. Keeping it brief, an evolution from barbarianism to Christianity was one of the most significant changes. This transition even led to a close relationship between Hungary and Pope Innocent III (1198-1216). The formation of this alliance provided some of the most detailed pieces of information regarding the foreign policy of Hungary and the internal affairs of Central Europe. The occurrence of Christianization in Hungary is crucial to understanding the events preceding the Treaty of Trencin. At end of the 13th century, Hungary would experience one of the greatest power struggles in the kingdom's history. After the death of Andrew III, the royal bloodline of Saint Stephen would come to an end. Adverse effects also took place as recognition of Central power would lose nearly all significance. This sent the territories of Hungary into a frenzy. However, in 1301, Charles of Anjou would be crowned. His inheritance of the throne would be the first in Hungarian history to be conducted by election over actual inheritance. Backed by Pope Boniface VIII, Charles would soon become the illegitimate ruler of Hungary. Many barons believed this appointment was blasphemy. In August of the same year, the barons would succeed in removing Charles with the appointment of Wenceslas, the son of Wenceslas II of Bohemia, although he would change his name to Ladislaus.

=== Poland ===
For most of the Middle Ages, the Polish kingdom would fall under the rule of what modern historians call “Piasts”. However, a phrase more commonly found in medieval Polish sources is “duces et principes Poloniae” or “the dukes and princes of Poland”. Regardless, Piast Poland would come to be the accepted nomenclature. In 965, Mieszko I or the prince of the Polanie, had severed an alliance between the Christian Czechs and the Slavs to the west. He did so by marrying the daughter of Boleslav I of Bohemia. The next year, Poland would convert to Latin Christianity, allowing Mieszko to take advantage of the many military and political resources of the German Empire, an action that would have been inconceivable prior to conversion. But this alliance was short-lived due to the many conflicting interests of the two empires. After many years of testing his abilities, Mieszko learned his place when he married the German princess Oda in 980, solidifying his alliance with the German Empire. This would lead to the earliest mention of Polish intervention in Silesia when Mieszko used his roughly 3,000 soldiers to annex Silesia, reclaiming the land from Bohemia. This gives some insight into the struggle over the territory, even in the earlier times of the Middle Ages.

By 1202, the Piast dynasty would begin establishing duchies, another term for territories in possession of royalty. This trend continued through 1288 in which seventeen duchies were established. Ten of these territories were in Silesia, further stressing its importance in Polish history. Following his death, Boleslaw III Wrymouth’s sons from his second wife joined forces against his successor Wladyslaw II. This led to the exile of Wladyslaw from both Poland and the duchy of Silesia (inherited from his father) in 1146. The consequences of these actions would create instability in the relations between the elder and younger generations of the Piast dynasty. About 60 years later, Silesia looked very different than in the time of Boleslaw III. Many towns had been established, most of which were governed by Germans. A majority of these towns spoke German and practiced German mannerisms. This would be the case until the end of the Middle Ages when Polish would again become the dominant language amongst commoners.

Just before the Treaty of Trencin, many small events of importance occurred. In 1305, Lokietek, former Silesian duke, was able to acquire Hungarian territories thanks to Hungary’s support of Charles I of Anjou in his desire for the throne. This led to conflicts between Lokietek and the German Empire. In 1308 he called upon the Teutonic Knights to help retake the castle of Gdansk from Otto and Waldemar, margraves of Germany. Following this event, the knights would help Lokietek gain control of the vast majority of Polish Pomerania by 1311. His alliance with the Teutonic Knights would diminish about a decade before his death on March 2, 1333. It was at this time that Casimir III would take the throne. In an attempt to establish stability within Poland, Casimir renewed the truce with the knights, setting up his rule only two year prior to the signing of the Treaty of Trencin.

== The Signing of the Treaty ==
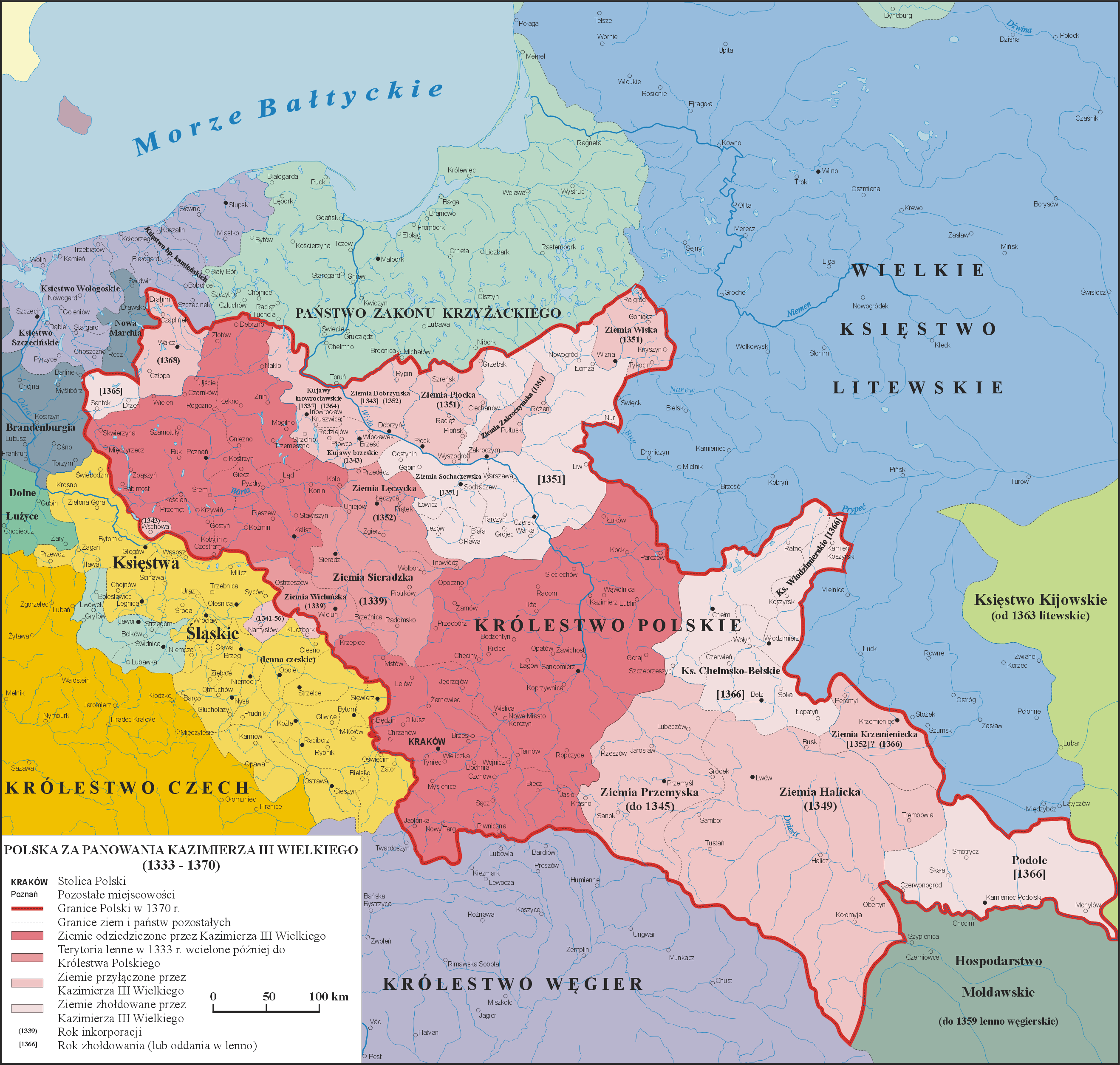
Poland under Casimir III (1333–1370), Silesian duchies shown in light yellow

Up until 1322, Charles I of Anjou had held a strong alliance with the Habsburg people, a small kingdom that held territory at the time in Central Europe. This had helped Charles maintain his defense against the Germans and Hungarians. However, after this time, the status of their alliance saw a rapid decline. For a few years, Charles participated in petty feuds with the Habsburgs. But in 1328, he was able to push back by acquiring the region known as Medjumurje. This was significant as this was the border lying between the Drava and Mura Rivers occupied by the Austrians. After successfully diminishing a number of Habsburg provinces, Charles would soon find himself lacking allies. North was where he looked for allies, finding them easily. The Piast dynasty in Poland and the Luxembourgs in Bohemia would give him constant support during his time of need. But this support first came from Charles. Starting in 1306, he provided arms to Wladislas Lokietek, future King of Poland. This alliance remained very strong from that point on. Charles would also send troops to support Casimir III when he was fighting back against the Teutonic Order. This alliance eventually led to the events in 1335. In August of that year, with the support of King John of Bohemia, Charles was able to maintain Silesia with the signing of the Treaty of Trencin.

In 1333 the Polish king Władysław was succeeded by his son Casimir III. He was prepared to compromise. Casimir III resorted to sue the Teutonic Order at the Roman Curia and settled the rising conflict with King John of Bohemia by the provisory Trentschin treaty on St Bartholomew's Day 1335. The negotiations at Trenčín Castle were attended personally by John of Luxembourg, King of Bohemia, his son Charles (the future Holy Roman emperor Charles IV) and Charles Robert, King of Hungary. King of Poland Casimir III the Great was represented by his deputies. The representatives of the Polish king, in perpetuity, renounced all claims to Silesia in favour of Bohemia while King John and his son Charles in turn finally waived their claims to the Polish throne derived from the Přemyslids. The agreement was to be confirmed, when the rulers met at the Congress of Visegrád later in November 1335.

King John now had a free hand to continue vassalizing the Silesian duchies of Ziębice/Münsterberg (1336) and Nysa/Neisse (1342). It was not until February 9, 1339, that Casimir ratified the treaty in Kraków. The agreement was again reaffirmed in 1346 for the Holy Roman Empire by John's son Charles IV, elected King of the Romans. It was reaffirmed in the 1348 Treaty of Namslau with King Casimir III and again in 1372 by Casimir's successor King Louis I.

Bolko II the Small remained the only Silesian duke, who was not content to accept Bohemian overlordship. However, he had no male heirs and his niece Anna von Schweidnitz married Emperor Charles IV in 1353. He signed an inheritance treaty whereupon the death of his widow Agnes of Austria, 1392, the Duchy of Jawor would finally fall to Bohemia.

== Aftermath ==
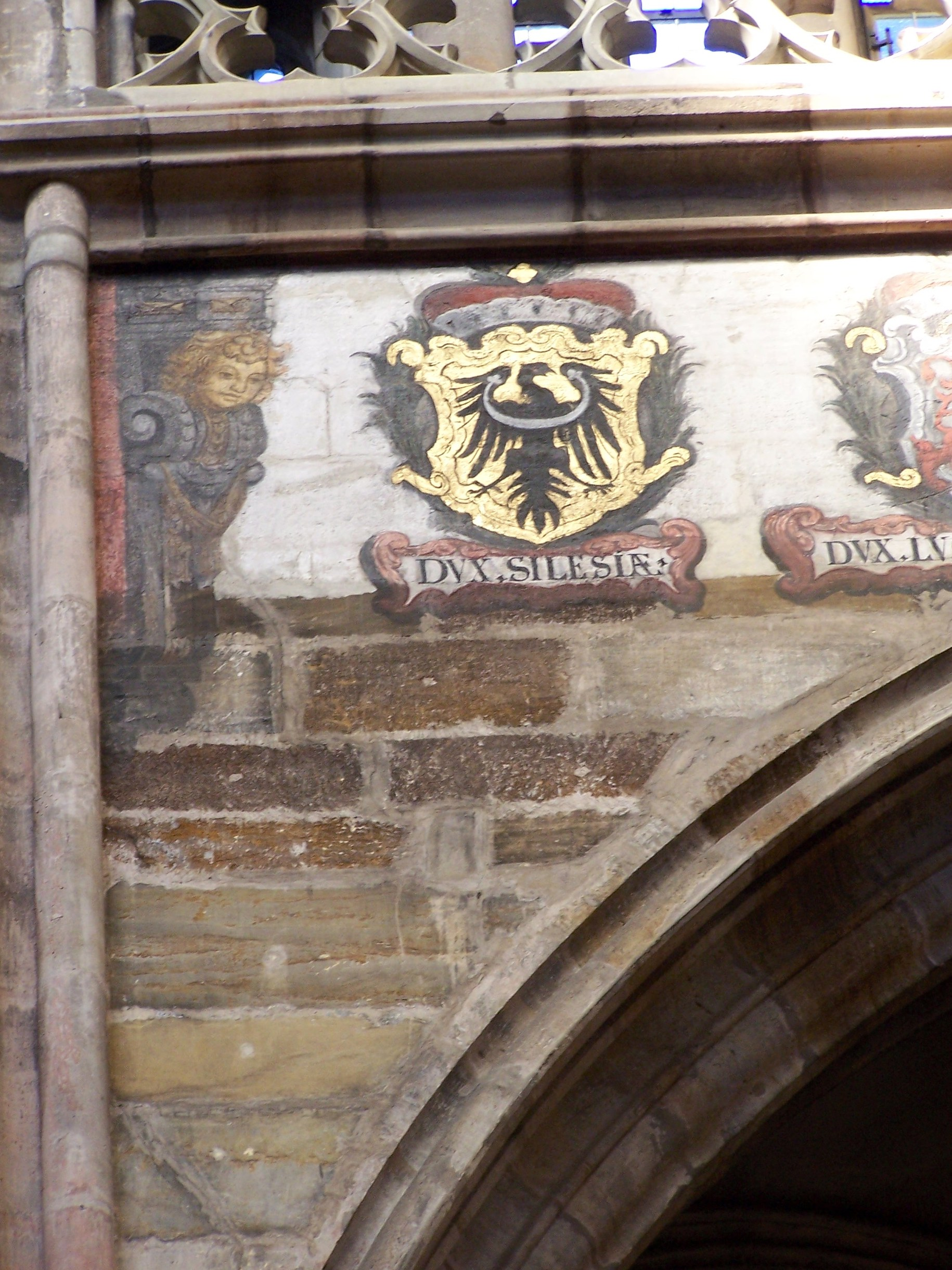
Silesian coat of arms at St. Vitus Cathedral, Prague

With the Treaty of Trentschin, the split of Silesia from the Polish Crown was made. In 1348 King Charles IV attached it to the Bohemian crown lands together with Moravia and the Lusatias. The Silesian dukes became indirect vassals of the Holy Roman Empire with no immediate status and no representation at the Imperial Diet. According to canon law, the Diocese of Wrocław remained a suffragan of the Polish Archdiocese of Gniezno. While the Silesian lands also comprised the former Moravian Duchy of Opava, the Upper Silesian duchies of Siewierz, Oświęcim and Zator were acquired by Poland in the 15th century. The Lower Silesian duchy of Krosno fell to Brandenburg in 1476.

Upon the death of the Bohemian king Louis II during the 1526 Battle of Mohács, his crown lands were inherited by the Habsburg king Ferdinand I and became a constituent of the Habsburg monarchy. Archduchess Maria Theresa, Bohemian queen from 1740 on, lost most of the Silesian crown land in the 1742 Treaty of Breslau. It was conquered by King Frederick II of Prussia. The bulk of Silesia returned to the Republic of Poland upon the implementation of the Oder–Neisse line according to the 1945 Potsdam Agreement.

The surrender of Silesia by Casimir established a border that remained stable and in effect until after World War I.

== See also ==
- History of Silesia
- Congress of Visegrád (1335)
- Treaty of Namslau
