= Congress of Visegrád (1339) =

Summit on the Polish succession

The second Congress of Visegrád was a 1339 summit in Visegrád that decided that if Casimir III of Poland died without a son, the King of Poland would be the son of Charles I of Hungary.

When Casimir died in 1370 from an injury received while he was hunting, in accordance with the decision of the Congress, Louis I of Hungary, son of Charles I, succeeded him as king of Poland in personal union with Hungary.

== Controversy around Yuri II's participation ==
Early modern Polish historiography claimed that Yuri II Bolesław, Prince of Galicia–Volhynia, participated in the Visegrád meetings of 1335 and 1338/1339, either personally or through his envoys. According to this account, the negotiations supposedly considered the possibility of the Polish or Hungarian king inheriting the Galician throne in the absence of direct heirs of the Galician Piasts. However, contemporary research disputes this claim, noting that no surviving sources record the presence of Yuri II or his envoys at these meetings. Moreover, during the subsequent War of Galician–Volhynian Succession (1340-1392), King Casimir III of Poland does not refer to any agreements that would have recognized him as the legitimate heir to the Galician throne.

The Dubnica Chronicle records that on 29 June 1338, the "Prince of Russia" ("Lothka dux Rutenorum") arrived in Visegrád. Modern historians suggest that this figure was most likely Vladislav Zemovitch, son of Prince Zemovitch Dobzhinsky and Anastasia Lvovna, and not Yuri II. The Polish side may have supported Vladislav Zemovitch as a counterweight to Yuri Bolesław Troidenovich, especially after the Lublin campaign of 1337. This campaign, conducted jointly with the Golden Horde and ending with the lifting of the siege twelve days after the death of the Horde's commander, was seen as Yuri II Boleslaw's response to the Polish-Hungarian rapprochement, similarly, the nomination of Vladislav Zemovitch as a possible candidate for the throne was a counter-reaction to this move.

== See also ==
- Congress of Visegrád (1335)
