= Congress of Visegrád (1335) =

Meeting between the kings of Bohemia, Poland, and Hungary

The first Congress of Visegrád was a 1335 summit in Visegrád in which Kings John I of Bohemia, Charles I of Hungary and Croatia, and Casimir III of Poland formed an anti-Habsburg alliance. The three leaders agreed to create new commercial routes to bypass the staple port of Vienna, which made merchants offer their goods there before they could try elsewhere, and to obtain easier access to other European markets.

The summit was triggered by the sudden expansion of Habsburg power in the region, which had taken over Carinthia and Carniola after the death of duke Henry of Gorizia-Tyrol, who had unsuccessfully claimed the Bohemian and the Polish crowns.

It also recognized Czech sovereignty over the Duchy of Silesia, which the Czech kings had controlled de jure with the Crown of Poland. John I relinquished the Polish crown to Casimir III in exchange for 1,200,000 Prague groschen. The Duchy of Silesia thus became part of the Czech Crown until 1742, when most of it was lost to Prussia and joined Poland after World War II in 1945. A small part is now in the Czech Republic.

The congress lasted around 21 days. Those who attended received various gifts, including chessboards, expensive belts and saddles, and oysters, and around 4000 loaves of bread were distributed to the representatives of the states. A second meeting took place in 1339 to chose the new king of Poland.

== See also ==
- Congress of Visegrád (1339)
- Treaty of Trentschin
- Treaty of Namslau
