= Wartislaw I of Świecie =

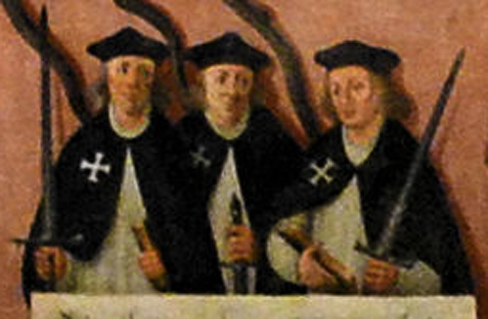
- Painting showing from the left: Wartislaw I, Sambor II and Racibor of Białogarda.

Steward of Świecie and Lubiszewo
- Reign: 1219/1220 – 1227
- Predecessor: Mestwin I
- Successor: title abolished

Duke of Świecie and Lubiszewo
- Reign: 1227 – 1227/1233
- Predecessor: title established
- Successor: title abolished
- Born: after 1195
- Died: between 1227 and 1233; Świecie, Duchy of Świecie and Lubiszewo (now part of Poland)
- Dynasty: Samboride
- Father: Mestwin I

Wartislaw I of Świecie (Note: Polish: Warcisław I świecki; Kashubian: Wartisłôw I Swiecczi) (after 1195 – 1227/1233) was a duke from the Samboride dynasty. From 1219 or 1220 until 1227 he was a steward of Świecie and Lubiszewo within the Duchy of Pomerelia. From 1227 until his death between 1227 and 1233, he was a duke of the Duchy of Świecie and Lubiszewo.

== History ==
He came from the Samboride dynasty and was a son of Mestwin I, and a brother of Swietopelk II, Racibor of Białogarda and Sambor II. He was born after 1195. After the death of his father in 1219 or 1220, he had become the steward of Świecie and Lubiszewo lands in the Duchy of Pomerelia, under the rule of Leszek the White. He had participated in the military campaigns of Leszek. In 1227, after the gaining of the independence of Pomerelia from the Kingdom of Poland, he was made a duke of the Duchy of Świecie and Lubiszewo by his brother, Swietopelk II, the duke of the Duchy of Gdańsk. He had died in Świecie between 1227 and 1233. Following his death, his state was divided between Swietopelk II, who got the area of Świecie, Sambor II, who got the Duchy of Lubiszewo, and Racibor of Białogarda, who got Duchy of Białogarda.
