= Duchy of Pomerelia =

Medieval duchy in Central Europe

Coordinates: 54°27′00″N 17°02′00″E

Duchy of Pomerelia Księstwo wschodniopomorskie (Polish)
- 11th century – 1046/1048 c. 1060 – 1227; 1270–1308
- Coat of arms

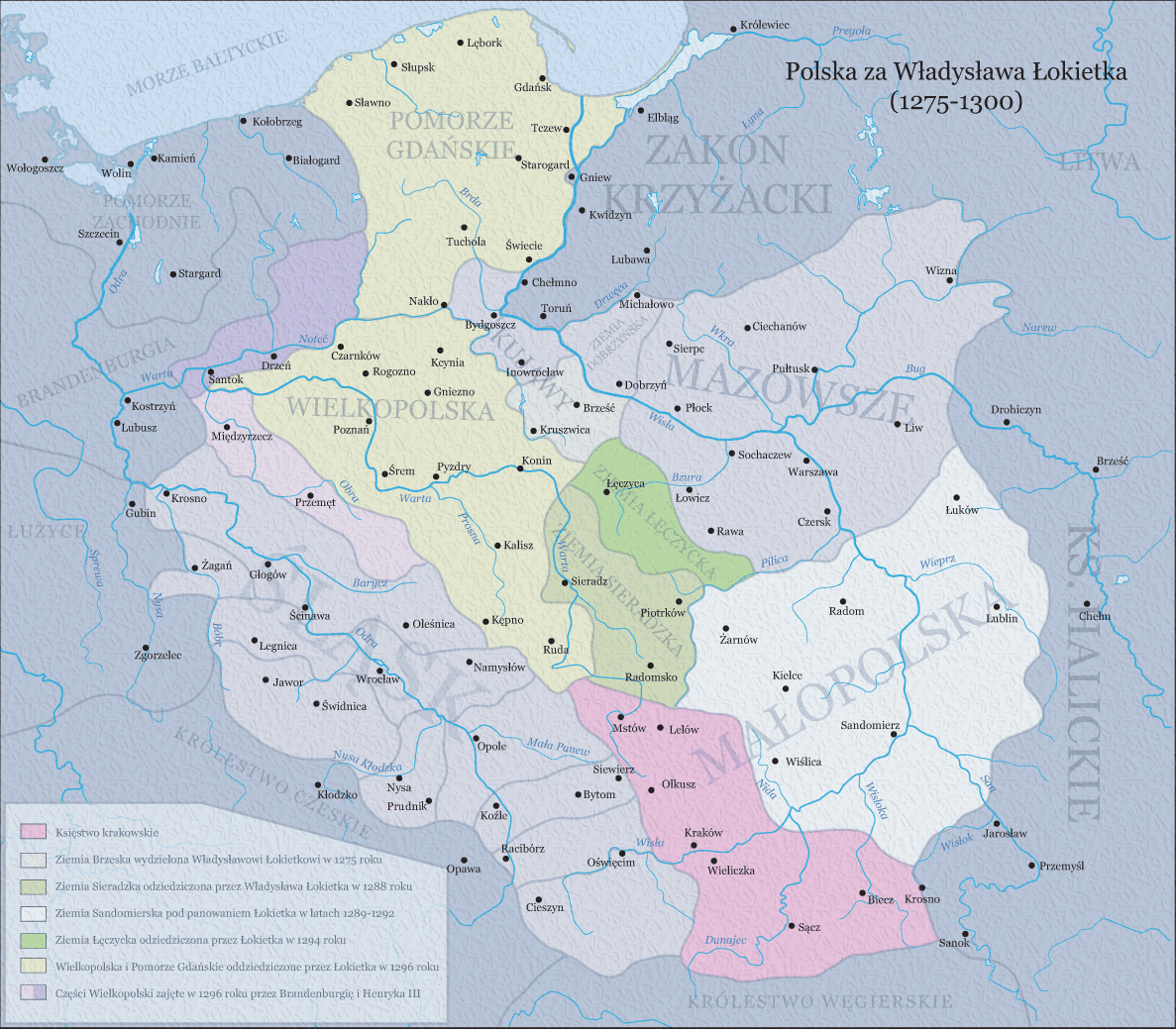
- Kingdom of Poland after 1296, including the Duchy of Pomerelia
- Status: Independent state (11th century – 1046/1048, c. 1060 – 1119, 1270–1294); Fiefdom of Kingdom of Poland (1119–1210, 1211–1223, 1294–1308); Fiefdom of Denmark (1210–1211)
- Capital: Gdańsk
- Common languages: Lechitic languages (including Old Polish and Kashubian), Middle Low German, Latin
- Religion: Roman Catholic
- Government: Duchy
- Duke
  - 11th century (first): Siemomysł
  - 1306–1308 (last): Władysław I Łokietek
- Historical era: High Middle Ages
  - Partition of the Kingdom of Poland: 11th century
  - Incorporation into the Duchy of Poland: 1046/1048
  - Partition from the Duchy of Poland: c. 1060
  - Becoming a fiefdom of the Duchy of Poland: 1119
  - Becoming a fiefdom of the Denmark: 1210
  - Becoming a fiefdom of the Duchy of Poland: 1211
  - Independence and partition into Duchy of Gdańsk and the Duchy of Świecie and Lubiszewo: 1227
  - Unification of the duchies of Gdańsk and Świecie: 1270
  - Becoming a fiefdom of the Duchy of Greater Poland: 1294
  - Conquest by the State of the Teutonic Order: 1308
Preceded by
Kingdom of Poland
Duchy of Poland
Duchy of Gdańsk
Duchy of Świecie
Succeeded by
Duchy of Poland
Duchy of Gdańsk
Duchy of Świecie and Lubiszewo
Margraviate of Brandenburg
State of the Teutonic Order

The Duchy of Pomerelia, (Note: Polish: Księstwo pomorskie) also known as the Duchy of Eastern Pomerania (Note: Polish: Księstwo wschodniopomorskie) and Gdańsk Pomerania, (Note: Polish: Pomorze Gdańskie) was a duchy centred on Pomerelia, with Gdańsk as its capital.

The duchy was formed after gaining independence from the Kingdom of Poland in the 11th century, following the death of Bolesław I the Brave in 1025. The duchy was then integrated back into Poland in 1046 or 1048 by Casimir I the Restorer, and its land remained under Polish rule until around 1060, when the duchy was restored. In 1119, the duchy was again conquered by Poland and became its fiefdom, being ruled by stewards under the rule of the King of Poland. In 1210, it briefly became a fiefdom of Denmark under the rule of Valdemar II, until it was reconquered the next year by the king of Poland, Leszek the White. In 1227, the duchy gained independence from Poland, whereupon it was divided into the Duchy of Gdańsk and the Duchy of Świecie and Lubiszewo. Pomerelia united again in 1270 from the duchies of Gdańsk and Świecie, remaining independent until 1294, when Przemysł II, king of Poland, became its duke, making it again dependent on Poland. In 1308, the city of Gdańsk was occupied by the Margraviate of Brandenburg. After this event, the whole duchy was conquered by the State of the Teutonic Order.

== History ==
=== As part of Poland ===
In the tenth century, Pomerelia was already settled by West-Slavic Pomeranians. The area was conquered and incorporated into early medieval Poland either by Duke Mieszko I – the first historical Polish ruler - in the second half of the tenth century or even earlier, by his father, in the 940s or 950s – the date of incorporation is unknown. Mieszko founded Gdańsk to control the mouth of the Vistula between 970 and 980. According to Józef Spors, despite some cultural differences, the inhabitants of the whole of Pomerania had very close ties with residents of other Piast provinces, from which Pomerelia was separated by large stretches of woodlands and swamps.

The Piasts introduced Christianity to pagan Pomerelia, though it is disputed to what extent the conversion materialized. In the eleventh century the region had loosened its close connections with the kingdom of Poland and subsequently for some years formed an independent duchy. Most scholars suggest that Pomerelia was still part of Poland during the reign of king Bolesław I of Poland and his son Mieszko II Lambert. However, there are also different opinions e.g. Peter Oliver Loew suggests the Slavs in Pomerelia severed their ties with the Piasts and reverted the Piasts' introduction of Christianity already in the first years of the 11th century. The exact date of separation is unknown, however. It was suggested that the inhabitants of Pomerelia participated in the Pagan reaction in Poland, actively supported Miecław who intended to detach Masovia from the power of the rulers of Poland, but after the defeat of Miecław in 1047 accepted the rule of duke Casimir I the Restorer and that the province remained a part of Poland till the 1060s, when Pomerelian troops took part in the expedition of the Polish king Bolesław II the Generous against Bohemia in 1061 or 1068. Duke Bolesław suffered a defeat during the siege of Hradec and had to retreat to Poland. Soon after Pomerelia separated from his realm. A campaign by Piast duke Władysław I Herman to conquer Pomerelia in 1090–91 was unsuccessful, but resulted in the burning of many Pomerelian forts during the retreat.

In 1116, direct control over Pomerelia was reestablished by Bolesław III Wrymouth of Poland, who by 1122 had also conquered the central and western parts of Pomerania. While the latter regions (forming the Duchy of Pomerania) regained independence quickly, Pomerelia remained within the Polish realm. It was administered by governors of a local dynasty, the Samborides, and subordinated to the bishopric of Włocławek. In 1138, following the death of Bolesław III, Poland was fragmented into several semi-independent principalities. The principes in Pomerelia gradually gained more local power, evolving into semi-independent entities, much like other fragmented Polish territories, with the difference that the other parts of the realm were governed by Piast descendants of Bolesław III. The Christian centre became Oliva Abbey near Gdańsk.

Two Samborides administering Pomerelia in the 12th century are known by name: Sobieslaw I and his son, Sambor I.

=== Danish conquest and independence ===
In 1210, king Valdemar II of Denmark invaded Pomerelia, whose princeps Mestwin I became his vassal. The Danish suzerainty did not last long, however. Mestwin had already gained more independence from Poland and expanded southward, and his son Swietopelk II, who succeeded him in 1217, gained full independence in 1227.

=== Duchy of Pomerelia ===
After Mestwin I's death, Pomerelia was internally divided among his sons Swietopelk II, Wartislaw, Sambor II and Ratibor. Swietopelk II, who took his seat in Gdańsk, assumed a leading position over his brothers: Sambor II, who received the castellany of Lubieszewo (the center later moved to Tczew), and Ratibor, who received the Białogard area, were initially under his tutelage. The fourth brother, Wartislaw, took his seat in Świecie, thus controlling the second important area besides Gdańsk. Wartislaw died before 27 December 1229, his share was to be given to Oliva Abbey by his brothers. The remaining brothers engaged in a civil war: Sambor II and Ratibor allied with the Teutonic Order and the Duke of Kuyavia against Swietopelk, who in turn allied with the Old Prussians, took Ratibor prisoner and temporarily assumed control over the latter's share. The revolt of the Old Prussians against the Teutonic Order in 1242 took place in the context of these alliances. Peace was restored only in the Treaty of Christburg (Dzierzgoń) in 1249, mediated by the later pope Urban IV, then papal legate and archidiacone of Lüttich (Liege).

In the west, the Pomerelian dukes' claim to the lands of Schlawe (Sławno) and Stolp (Słupsk), where the last Ratiboride duke Ratibor II had died after 1223, was challenged by the Griffin dukes of Pomerania, Barnim I and Wartislaw III. In this conflict, Swietopelk II initially won the upper hand, but could not force a final decision.

Swietopelk II, who styled himself dux. since 1227, chartered the town of Gdańsk with Lübeck law and invited the Dominican Order. His conflicts with the Teutonic Order, who had become his eastern neighbor in 1230, were settled in 1253 by exempting the order from the Vistula dues. With Swietopelk II's death in 1266, the rule of his realm passed to his sons Wartislaw and Mestwin II. These brothers initiated another civil war, with Mestwin II allying with and pledging allegiance to the Brandenburg margraves (Treaty of Arnswalde/Choszczno 1269). The margraves, who in the 1269 treaty also gained the land of Białogard, were also supposed to help Mestwin II securing the lands of Schlawe (Sławno) and Stolp (Słupsk), which after Swietopelk II's death were in part taken over by Barnim III. With the margraves' aid, Mestwin II succeeded in expelling Wartislaw from Gdansk in 1270/71. The lands of Schlawe/Slawno, however, were taken over by Mestwin II's nephew Wizlaw II, prince of Rügen in 1269/70, who founded the town of Rügenwalde (now Darlowo) near the fort of Dirlow.

In 1273, Mestwin found himself in open conflict against the margraves who refused to remove their troops from Gdańsk, Mestwin's possession, which he had been forced to temporarily lease to them during his struggles against Wartisław and Sambor. Since the lease had now expired, through this action, the Margrave Conrad broke the Treaty of Arnswalde/Choszczno and subsequent agreements. His aim was to capture as much of Mestwin's Pomerelia as possible. Mestwin, unable to dislodge the Brandenburgian troops himself called in the aid of Bolesław the Pious, whose troops took the city with a direct attack. The war against Brandenburg ended in 1273 with a treaty (possibly signed at Drawno Bridge), in which Brandenburg returned Gdańsk to Mestwin while he paid feudal homage to the margraves for the lands of Schlawe (Sławno) and Stolp (Słupsk).

On February 15, 1282, High Duke of Poland and Wielkopolska Przemysł II and the Duke of Pomerelia Mestwin II, signed the Treaty of Kępno which transferred the suzerainty over Pomerelia to Przemysł. As a result of the treaty the period of Pomerelian independence ended and the region was again part of Poland. Przemysł adopted the title dux Polonie et Pomeranie (Duke of Poland and Pomerania). Mestwin, per the agreement, retained de facto control over the province until his death in 1294, at which time Przemysł, who was already the de jure ruler of the territory, took it under his direct rule.

=== Polish rule ===
After the death of Mestwin II of Pomerania in 1294, his co-ruler Przemysł II of Poland, according to the Treaty of Kępno, took control over Pomerelia. He was crowned as king of Poland in 1295, but ruled directly only over Pomerelia and Greater Poland, while the rest of the country (Silesia, Lesser Poland, Masovia) was ruled by other Piasts. However, Przemysł was murdered soon afterwards and succeeded by Władysław I the Elbow-high. Władysław, sold his rights to the Duchy of Kraków to King Wenceslaus II of Bohemia in 1297 and accepted him as his suzerain in 1299. However, he lost control of Greater Poland and Pomerelia in 1300 after a nobility revolt. These were captured by Wenceslaus who now, after gaining most of the Polish lands, was crowned in Gniezno as king of Poland by archbishop Jakub Świnka Upon the deaths of Wenceslaus and his successor Wenceslaus III and with them the extinction of the Přemyslid dynasty, Pomerelia was recaptured by Władysław I the Elbow-high in 1306.

=== Conquest by the Teutonic Order ===
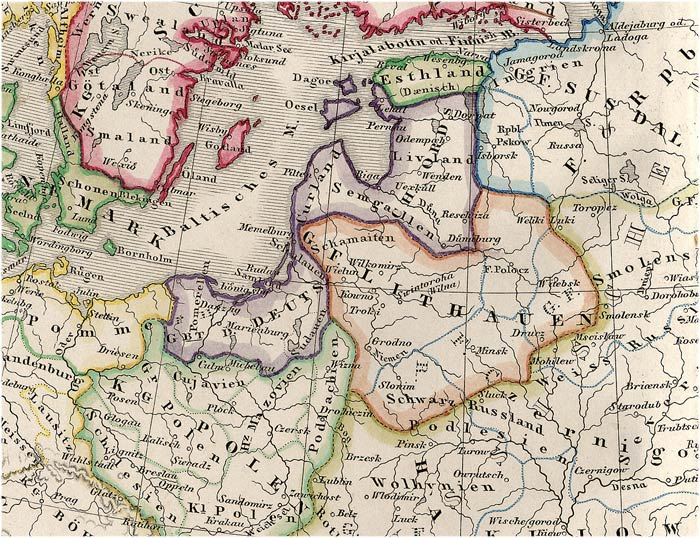
Pomerelia as a part of the Teutonic Knights' state in the early 14th century

During Władysław's rule, the Margraviate of Brandenburg staked its claim on the territory in 1308, leading Władysław I the Elbow-high to request assistance from the Teutonic Knights, who evicted the Brandenburgers but took the area for themselves, annexing and incorporating it into the Teutonic Order state in 1309 (Teutonic takeover of Danzig (Gdańsk) and Treaty of Soldin/Myślibórz). At the same time, Słupsk and Sławno became part of the Duchy of Pomerania. This event caused a long-lasting dispute between Poland and the Teutonic Order over the control of Gdańsk Pomerania. It resulted in a series of Polish–Teutonic Wars throughout the 14th and 15th centuries.

== List of leaders ==
=== Dukes ===
- Siemomysł (11th century)
- Świętobor (c. 1060 – 1106)
- Swietopelk I (1106 – ok. 1113)

=== Stewards ===
- Sobieslaw I (until c. 1178)
- Sambor I (c. 1178 – 1205/07)
- Mestwin I (1205/07–1213/20)
- Swietopelk II (1213/20–1227)

=== Dukes ===
- Mestwin II (1270–1294)
- Przemysł II (1294–1296)
- Leszek of Inowrocław (1296)
- Władysław I Łokietek (1296–1299)
- Wenceslaus II of Bohemia (1299–1305)
- Wenceslaus III of Bohemia (1305–1306)
- Władysław I Łokietek (1306–1308)
