= First war against Swantopolk II =

13th-century war in Pomerelia and Kuyavia

First war against Swietopelk II
Date	1236–1238
Location	Pomerelia, Kuyavia
Result	Conquest of the duchies of Lubiszewo and Białogarda by Gdańsk; Pledge of allegiance to Swantopolk II by Sambor II and Ratibor; Conquest of Bydgoszcz by the Duchy of Kuyavia; Trial and excommunication of Swietopelk II

Belligerents
Duchy of Gdańsk	Duchy of Lubiszewo (1236); Mecklenburgian troops (1237–1238); Duchy of Białogarda (1237–1238); Duchy of Kuyavia (1238)

Commanders and leaders
Swietopelk II	Sambor II; Ratibor of Białogarda; Casimir I of Kuyavia

The first war against Swantopolk II was a military conflict in Pomerelia and Kuyavia. It was fought between 1236 and 1238 by the Duchy of Lubiszewo, and later the Mecklenburgian forces, both led by Sambor II, the Duchy of Białogarda, led by Ratibor and the Duchy of Kuyavia, led by Casimir I, all fighting against Duchy of Gdańsk, led by Swantopolk II. The conflict ended with the conquest of Lubiszwo and Białogarda, and subsequent recovery of control over their rulers by Swantopolk II. Additionally, Kuyavia conquered neighboring lands of the Duchy of Gdańsk, and was subsequently raided by it, receiving heavy financial and material losses. Following the war, Swietopelk II was excommunicated by the Catholic Church.

== War ==
On 15 June 1236, Swantopolk II announced to his brothers that he had designated his oldest son, Mestwin II, as his successor, as the duke of Pomerelia. This violated the agnatic seniority law, which stated that the eldest brother should be the successor. At the time, Sambor II, with the help of the Teutonic Order, had started fortifying in the settlement of Gorzędziej. That autumn, Swantopolk II had attacked it, defeating Sambor's forces and conquering the Duchy of Lubiszewo. After the fight, he spared the life of his brother Sambor, exiling him. Additionally, Swantopolk II formed an alliance with Sambians, Natangians and Warmians.

Sambor II aligned with the forces from Mecklenburg. Around 1237, Mecklenburgian fleet had begun fighting with Gdańsk forces alongside the Baltic Sea coast. Later on, crossing the Vistula river. In 1237 or at the beginning of 1238, Ratibor, fortified Białogarda, and, aided with troops of Kuyavian bishop, attacked the Schlawe and Stolp Land, which he subsequently conquered and plundered. At the same time Sambor II captured the settlement of Słońca. On 1 March 1238, Sambor II, together with Mecklenburgian troops, traveled to Białogarda, in order to pursue Ratibor, to unite in the war against Swantopolk II. Soon after, Swantopolk II defeated Sambor in the battle of Słońca, capturing him and keeping him captive until around 1239. Then, he attacked Białogarda, destroying the army of Ratibor, conquering his duchy, and burning its capital subsequently. Ratibor was also exiled to Kuyavia until 1239.

The Duchy of Kuyavia, led by Casimir I, attacked the Duchy of Gdańsk, conquering Bydgoszcz Castellany. On 11 June 1238, Swantopolk II signed an agreement with the Teutonic Order, according to which he would not ally with Prussian tribes. In August 1238, Swantopolk II organized a raid on the Duchy of Kuyavia, aimed against Casimir I and bishop Michał, as the response to the previous attack. During the attack, his army destroyed around 23 villages and the properties of bishops and monasteries, as well as devastating the town of Inowrocław, and stealing a massive amount of farm animals.

Following the attack, Swantopolk II was excommunicated from the Catholic Church. On 30 November 1238, Swantopolk II was put on the trial by Polish episcopal conference, against bishops of Kuyavia and Płock, Strzelno monastery and Gdańsk Dominicans, all of whom were victims of his raid. According to the trial verdict, he had to financially compensate the victims to end his excommunication. He never managed to fulfill it. In 1239, around the Easter, Swantopolk II, had released Sambor II, and allowed Ratibor to come back from exile, returning their duchies to them. In return, both brothers had to pledge their allegiance to Gdańsk.

== Notable battles ==
- Battle of Słońca

== See also ==
- Second war against Swantopolk II
- Civil war in Pomerelia

== Citations ==
=== Bibliography ===
- Śliwiński, Błażej (2015). Sambor II : książę tczewski (1211 lub 1212 - 30 grudnia 1276/1278). ISBN 978-83-7730-163-0. OCLC 945584544.
- Smoliński, Marek (1969- (2016). Świętopełk Gdański. Wydawnictwo Poznańskie. ISBN 978-83-7976-347-4. OCLC 944103614.
- Karczewski, Dariusz (2017). Książę Kazimierz Konradowic i Kujawy jego czasów (in Polish). Wydawnictwo AVALON Sp. z o.o. ISBN 978-83-7730-225-5.
