= Battle of Słońca =

13th-century battle in Europe

- Part of the first war against Swietopelk II
| Date | 1238 |
| Location | near Słońca, Pomerelia |
| Result | Gdańsk victory |
| Territorial changes | Reincorporation of Słońca into Duchy of Gdańsk |

Belligerents
| Duchy of Gdańsk | Mecklenburgian troops |

Commanders and leaders
| Swietopelk II | Sambor II |

Battle of Słońca (Note: Polish: bitwa pod Słońcami) was fought in 1238, during the first war against Swietopelk II. It was fought near the settlement of Słońca by defending forces of Mecklenburgian troops led by Sambor II, exiled leader of recently conquered Duchy of Lubiszewo against the attacking Duchy of Gdańsk led by Swietopelk II. The battle had ended with Gdańsk victory and capture of Sambor II.

== History ==
In 1237 or at the beginning of 1238, as part of the war against Duchy of Gdańsk led by Swietopelk II, Sambor II with his army of the Mecklenburgian troops had attacked and occupied the settlement of Słońca, that belonged to Gdańsk. On 1 March 1238, Sambor II, together with Mecklenburgian troops, had traveled to Białogarda, in order to pursue duke Ratibor, to unite in the war against Swietopelk II. Soon after that, Swietopelk II had defeated Sambor in the battle near Słońca, capturing him and keeping him captive in the settlement until around 1239. Słońca was reincorporated into the Duchy of Gdańsk.

== Citations ==
=== Bibliography ===
- Marek Smoliński, Świętopełk Gdański
