= Duchy of Białogarda =

Former duchy in Pomerelia

Duchy of Białogarda Księstwo białogardzkie (Polish)
- 1233–1238; 1239–1262
- Coat of arms
- Official languages: Polish, Latin
- Religion: Roman Catholic
- Government: Duchy
- Duke
  - 1233–1262: Racibor of Białogarda
- Historical era: High Middle Ages
  - Partition of the Duchy of Świecie and Lubiszewo: 1233
  - Occupation by Duchy of Gdańsk: 1238
  - Reestablishment of the state: 1239
  - Racibor of Białogarda being held captive by Swietopelk II: 1247
  - Realasement of Racibor: c. 1248
  - Incorporation into the State of the Teutonic Order: 1262
Preceded by	Succeeded by
Duchy of Świecie and Lubiszewo	State of the Teutonic Order
- Today part of: Poland

Duchy of Białogarda (Polish: Księstwo białogardzkie) was a duchy in the Pomerelia centred around its capital, Białogarda. It was formed in 1233 from the partition of the Duchy of Świecie and Lubiszewo, and existed until 1262 when it was incorporated into the State of the Teutonic Order. Its only ruler was duke Racibor of Białogarda of the Samboride dynasty.

== History ==
The state was formed from the partition of the Duchy of Świecie and Lubiszewo, with Racibor of Białogarda being made its duke by his older brother, Swietopelk II, duke of Gdańsk. Białogarda had become the capital of the country. In 1237, persuaded by his brother, duke Sambor II, duke of Lubiszewo, Racibor had invaded Pomerania-Schlawe. Alternatively, according to some historians, he could be Ratibor II, who ruled Pomerania-Schlawe, after the death of Bogislaw III in 1223.

On 1 March 1238, Sambor II, together with Mecklenburg troops, had traveled to Białogarda, in order to pursue Racibor to starting a war against Swietopelk II. Soon after, Swietopelk had destroyed Racibor's army and conquered Białogarda. Following that, Racibor got exiled to the Duchy of Kuyavia, where he joined the court of Casimir I. Between March and April 1239, he had pledged the loyalty to Swietopelk II, after which, he was reestablished as duke of Białogarda.

On 28 August 1243, Racibor, Casimir I and Heinrich IV von Weida, Landmeister of the Teutonic Order, had formed an alliance against Swietopelk II. In the agreement, Racibor was promised the land of Wyszogród, in case of the war. In the response, Swietopelk II had captured and imprisoned Racibor, claiming that the alliance broke their previous agreements. He got released around 1248, once again regaining the rule over the Duchy of Białogarda. Following that, Racibor remained an ally to Swietopelk. In 1262, he had joined the Teutonic Order, giving lands of his duchy to the State of the Teutonic Order.

== Bibliography ==
- E. Rymar, Rodowód książąt pomorskich
- Labuda Gerard, Mściwoj I. Słownik biograficzny Pomorza Nadwiślańskiego, vol. 3, Gdańsk. 1997.
- Józef Wójcicki, Dzieje Polski nad Bałtykiem. Warsaw. Książka i Wiedza. 1989
