= Duchy of Świecie and Lubiszewo =

Former monarchy in Europe

Duchy of Świecie and Lubiszewo Księstwo świecko-lubiszewskie (Polish)
- 1227–1227/1233
- Coat of arms
- Capital: Świecie
- Common languages: Lechitic languages (including Old Polish), Middle Low German, Latin
- Religion: Roman Catholic
- Government: Duchy
- Duke
  - 1227–1227/1233: Warcisław I of Świecie
- Historical era: High Middle Ages
  - Partition of the Duchy of Pomerelia: 1227
  - Partition between duchies of Gdańsk, Lubiszewo and Białogarda: 1227/1233
Preceded by
| Duchy of Eastern Pomerania |
Succeeded by
| Duchy of Gdańsk |
| Duchy of Lubiszewo |
| Duchy of Białogarda |
- Today part of: Poland

Duchy of Świecie and Lubiszewo (Note: Polish: Księstwo świecko-lubiszewskie) was a duchy in Pomerelia centred around Świecie and Lubiszewo. It was formed in 1227 from the partition of the Duchy of Pomerelia and existed between 1227 and 1233 when it was partitioned between the duchies of Gdańsk, Lubiszewo and Białogarda.

== History ==
In 1227, after the death of Leszek the White, the High Duke of Poland, the Duchy of Pomerelia had achieved independence from the Kingdom of Poland. Following that, the duke of Pomerelia, Swietopelk II, had partitioned the county between himself and his brother, Warcisław I of Świecie, to whom he had given the Świecie and Lubiszewo. Wartisław I had died between 1227 and 1233. Following his death, his state was divided between Swietopelk II, who got the area of Świecie, Sambor II, who got the Duchy of Lubiszewo, and Racibor of Białogarda, who got Duchy of Białogarda.

== Citations ==
=== Bibliography ===
- Labuda Gerard, Mściwoj I, Słownik biograficzny Pomorza Nadwiślańskiego, vol. 3, Gdańsk. 1997.
- Bądkowski L., Samp W., Poczet książąt Pomorza Gdańskiego, Gdańsk. 1974.
- Śliwiński B., Poczet książąt gdańskich, Gdańsk. 1997.
- Józef Wójcicki, Dzieje Polski nad Bałtykiem. Warsaw. Książka i Wiedza. 1989
