= Duchy of Lubiszewo =

Former duchy in Pomerelia

Duchy of Lubiszewo Księstwo lubiszewskie (Polish)
- 1227/1233–1236; 1239–1243; 1251–1269
- Coat of arms
- Status: Vassal of the Duchy of Gdańsk (1227/1233–1236, 1239–1243); Vassal of the State of the Teutonic Order (1251–1269)
- Capital: Lubiszewo (1227/1233–1252/1253); Tczew (1252/1253–1270)
- Official languages: Polish, Latin
- Religion: Roman Catholic
- Government: Duchy
- Duke
  - 1227/1233–1236, 1239–1243, 1251–1269: Sambor II
- Historical era: High Middle Ages
  - Partition of the Duchy of Świecie and Lubiszewo: 1227/1233
  - Incorporation into the Duchy of Gdańsk: 1236
  - Reestablishment of the state: 1239
  - Incorporation into the Duchy of Gdańsk: 1242
  - Reestablishent of the state: 1251
Preceded by	Succeeded by
Duchy of Świecie and Lubiszewo; Duchy of Gdańsk	Duchy of Gdańsk; Duchy of Świecie
- Today part of: Poland

Duchy of Lubiszewo, (Note: Polish: Księstwo lubiszewskie) since 1252 or 1253 also known as the Duchy of Lubiszewo and Tczew, (Note: Polish: księstwo lubiszewsko-tczewskie) and the Duchy of Tczew, (Note: Polish: księstwo tczewskie) was a duchy in the Pomerelia centred around the towns of Lubiszewo and Tczew. Its capital was originally Lubiszewo, and since 1252 or 1253, it was moved to Tczew. Its only ruler was duke Sambor II of the Samboride dynasty.

== History ==
The state was established between 1227 and 1233, in the partition of the Duchy of Świecie and Lubiszewo, as the vassal of the Duchy of Gdańsk. It existed until 1236, when it got conquered by the Duchy of Gdańsk during the war between two countries. It was reestablished in 1239 by Swietopelk II, Duke of Gdańsk, as his vassal, with Sambor II being allowed to return on the throne. It got again incorporated into the Duchy of Gdańsk in 1243. It was re-established in 1251 as the vassal of the State of the Teutonic Order. It existed until 1269, when it got incorporated into the Duchy of Świecie during the civil war in Pomerelia.

== Citations ==
=== Bibliography ===
- Gerard Labuda: Zwycięstwo ustroju wczesnofeudalnego na Pomorzu Wschodnim (1120–1310), In: Historia Pomorza, vol. 1: do roku 1466. Poznań, 1972.
