= Ratibor of Białogarda =

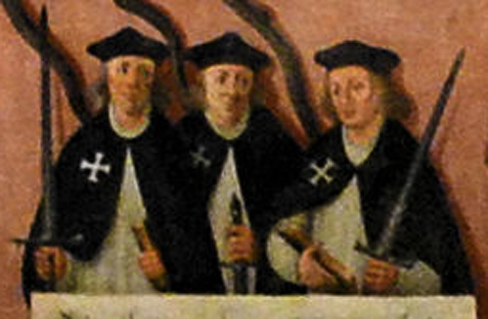
- Painting showing from the left: Warcisław I, Sambor II and Racibor.

Duke of Białogarda
- Reign: 1233–1262
- Predecessor: title created
- Successor: title abolished
- Born: c. 1212
- Died: 6 June 1272; Rhodes, Byzantine Empire (now part of Greece)
- Dynasty: Samboride
- Father: Mestwin I
- Mother: Zwinisława

Ratibor of Białogarda (Note: Polish: Racibor białogardzki; Kashubian: Ratibór biôłogardzczi) (c. 1212 – 6 June 1272) was a duke from the Samboride dynasty. From 1233 until 1262, he was a duke of the Duchy of Białogarda. In 1262, he became the knight of the Teutonic Order, giving his lands to it.

== History ==
Racibor was born around 1212. He came from the Samboride dynasty and was a son of Mestwin I and Zwinisława, and the brother of Swietopelk II, Warcisław I and Sambor II. After the death of his father in 1219 or 1220, Swietopelk II took care of Racibor, Warcisław and Sambor II until they reached the ages of 20. Upon that, Racibor had been titled the duke of Białogarda, receiving his duchy, that was formed from the partition of the Duchy of Świecie and Lubiszewo. Białogarda had become the capital of the country. In 1237, persuaded by Sambor II, duke of Lubiszewo, Racibor had invaded Pomerania-Schlawe. Alternatively, according to some historians, he could be Ratibor II, who ruled Pomerania-Schlawe, after the death of Bogislaw III in 1223.

On 1 March 1238, Sambor II, together with Mecklenburg troops, had traveled to Białogarda, in order to pursue Racibor to starting a war against Swietopelk II. Soon after, Swietopelk had destroyed Racibor's army and conquered Białogarda. Following that, Racibor got exiled to the Duchy of Kuyavia, where he joined the court of Casimir I. Between March and April 1239, he had pledged loyalty to Swietopelk II, after which, he was reestablished as duke of Białogarda.

On 28 August 1243, Racibor, Casimir I and Heinrich IV von Weida, Landmeister of the Teutonic Order, had formed an alliance against Swietopelk II. In the agreement, Racibor was promised the land of Wyszogród, in case of war. In response, Swietopelk II had captured and imprisoned Racibor, claiming that the alliance broke their previous agreements. He got released around 1248, once again regaining the rule over the Duchy of Białogarda. Following that, Racibor remained an ally to Swietopelk. In 1262, he had joined the Teutonic Order, becoming a knight, and giving the lands of his duchy to the State of the Teutonic Order.

In 1272, Racibor probably had made a pilgrimage to the Holy Land. He probably died on 6 June 1272, on the island of Rhodes, in the Byzantine Empire. He died without kids, ending his line of the dynasty.
