= Pomerania-Schlawe =

Feudal duchy in Eastern Europe during the Middle Ages

Duchy of Pomerania-Schlawe Księstwo sławieńskie (Polish) Herzogtum Pommern-Schlawe (German) Ducatus Slaunensis (Latin)
- 1190–1226/1238
- Coat of arms
- Status: Fiefdom of Denmark
- Capital: Sławno
- Religion: Roman Catholic
- Government: Feudal duchy
- Duke
  - 1190–1223 (first): Bogislaw III
  - 1223–1236/1238 (last): Ratibor II
- Historical era: High Middle Ages
  - Separation from Pomerania-Stettin: 1190
  - Incorporation into the Duchy of Gdańsk: 1236/1238
Preceded by	Succeeded by
Pomerania-Stettin	Duchy of Gdańsk
- Today part of: Poland

The Duchy of Pomerania-Schlawe, (Note: German: Herzogtum Pommern-Schlawe) also known as the Duchy of Sławno, (Note: Polish: Księstwo sławieńskie; Latin: Ducatus Slaunensis) was a feudal duchy with its capital in Sławno, located in Pomerania (in modern northwest Poland). It was formed in 1190, when it separated from the Duchy of Szczecin. In 1238 it was conquered and incorporated into the Duchy of Gdańsk.

== History ==
The duchy was formed in 1190 when it separated from Duchy of Szczecin. It was a feudal duchy under the sovereignty of Denmark. The state was located in the Słupsk and Sławno Land in Pomerania and its capital was Sławno. Bogislaw III became the ruler of the country. His existence remain contested, instead being proposed by some historians to be Bogusław I or Bogislaw II. After his death, he was succsided by Ratibor II, whose existence also remains contested. Instead, he is sometimes proposed to be Ratibor of Białogarda or Racibor Bogusławowic. Between 1236 and 1238, the duchy was conquered and incorporated into the Duchy of Gdańsk.

== List of rulers ==
- Bogislaw III (1190–1223)
  - Note: theorised to be Bogusław I or Bogislaw II
- Ratibor II (1223–1226/1238)
  - Note: theorised to be Ratibor of Białogarda or Racibor Bogusławowic
