= Sobiesław I, Duke of Pomerania =

Sobieslaw I (Polish: Sobiesław I Gdański, Kashubian: Subisłôw I) (d. 1177/79) or Subislaw I was the first recorded member of the Samborides (Sobiesławice) dynasty ruling Pomerelia (Gdańsk Pomerania).

His ancestry has not been conclusively established, an affiliation with the Pomerelian duke Swietopelk I (1109–1113), the Polish Piast dynasty or the Pomeranian Griffins is uncertain. His ancestors probably had been appointed governors in Pomerelia after its conquest by the Polish duke Bolesław III Wrymouth in 1116. Sobieslaw is credited with the donation of St. Catherine's Church at Gdańsk and the foundation of the Cistercian abbey of Oliwa about 1180, which formerly has been attributed to his son Sambor I.

== Family ==
Sobieslaw was married before 1150. He is the father of

- Sambor I of Pomerania and
- Mestwin I of Pomerania.

As the biographical sources are poor, traditional historiography has referred to his son Sambor I as ancestor of the Samborides dynasty.

== See also ==
- Pomeranian duchies and dukes
- Gryfici (Świebodzice)

Sobiesław I, Duke of Pomerania Samborides Born: ~ 1130s Died: 1177/79
Preceded by unknown	Prince of Pomerelia; ~1150s–1177/79	Succeeded by Sambor I
