= Józef Spors =

Polish historian (1941–1992)

Józef Spors (August 13, 1941 – June 13, 1992) was a Polish historian, specializing in the medieval History of Poland and its northern region - Pomerania.

== Biography ==
Spors was born in Toruń in 1941, during German occupation of Poland. He studied history at the Nicolaus Copernicus University in Toruń. He graduated in 1965 after presenting thesis concerning Brandenburg expansion into Polish lands in the 13th century. His Ph.D. thesis concerned political history of the Land of Słupsk-Sławno and the region of Białogard in the 13th and 14th centuries. He received his postdoctoral after publishing a dissertation concerning administrative divisions of Gdańsk Pomerania and the Land of Słupsk-Sławno from 12th to 14th century.

During his short life he published over 80 publications including 6 historical monographies. Another 20 were published after his death. His main field of interest was history of both Western and Gdańsk Pomerania. However his works concentrated on the history of the whole of Medieval Poland as well.

He was the founder and first director of the Institute of history at the Pomeranian Academy in Słupsk from 1986 to 1991. He was buried in Słupsk cemetery on June 17, 1992.

== Publications ==
- Dzieje polityczne ziemi słupskiej, sławieńskiej i białogardzkiej w XII-XIVw (1973)
- Agresja Brandenburska wobec Polski do 1278 roku. (1973)
- Podział dzielnicowy Polski według statutu Bolesława Krzywoustego ze szczególnym uwzględnieniem dzielnicy seniorackiej. (1978)
- Podziały administracyjne Pomorza Gdańskiego i Sławieńsko-słupskiego od XII do początku XIV w. (1983)
- Studia nad wczesnośredniowiecznymi dziejami Pomorza Zachodniego. XII - pierwsza połowa XIII w. (1988)
- Wojewodowie Polski dzielnicowej w XII i XIII wieku. cz. I (1991)
- Uwagi nad genezą wojewody dzielnicowego w Polsce XII - początku XIII wieku. (1991)
- Organizacja kasztelańska na Pomorzu Zachodnim (1991)
