= Białogarda =

- Village
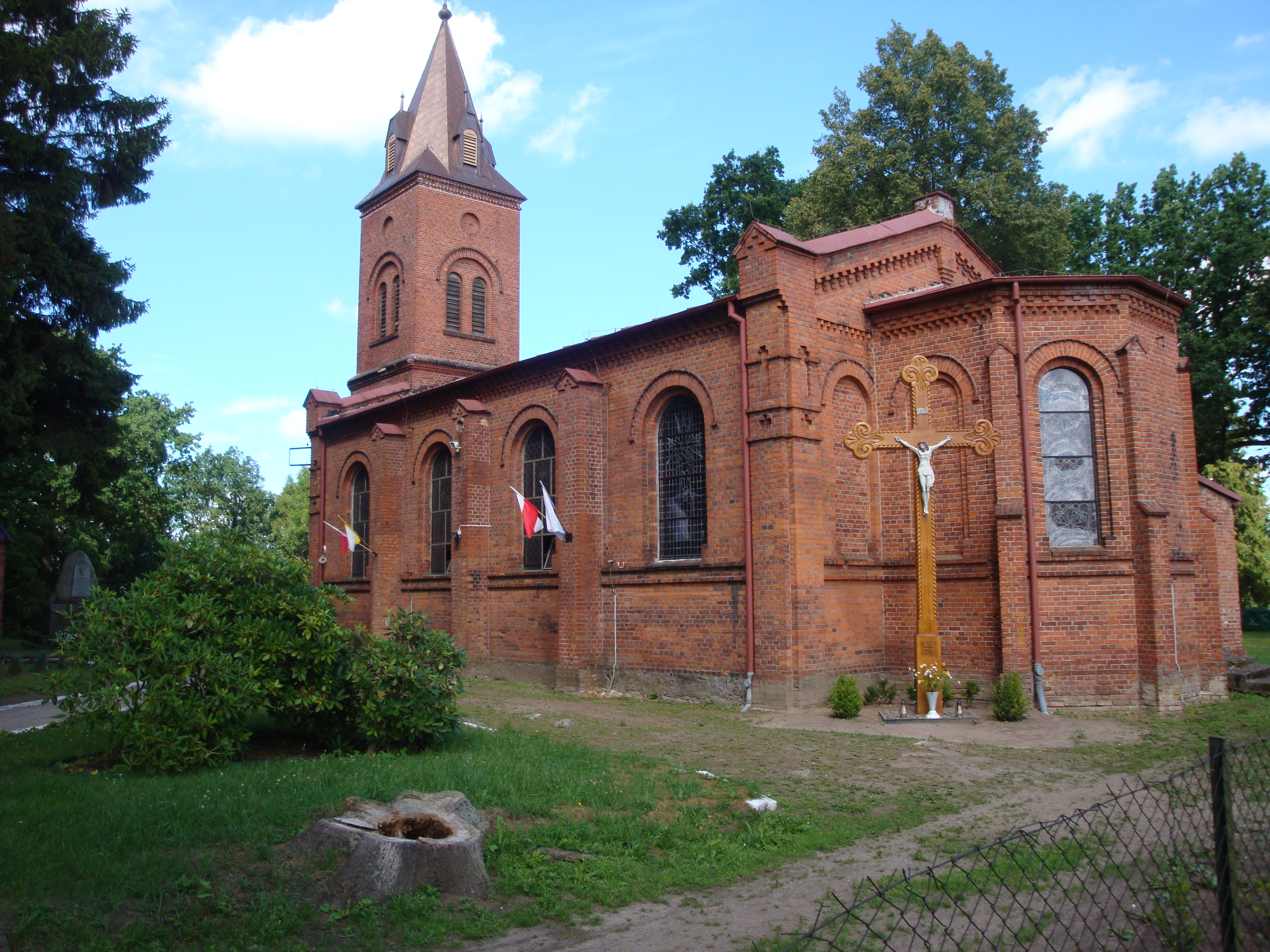
- St John the Baptist's Church

- Location within Poland
- Coordinates: 54°39′8″N 17°39′12″E
- Country: Poland
- Voivodeship: Pomeranian
- County: Lębork
- Gmina: Wicko
- Population: 223

Białogarda ([bjawɔˈɡarda]) (German: Belgard an der Leba; Kashubian: Biôłogarda) is a village in the administrative district of Gmina Wicko, within Lębork County, Pomeranian Voivodeship, in northern Poland. It is situated east of the Łeba river in the historic Pomerelian region.

== History ==
Białogarda is one of the oldest documented settlements of the region, mentioned in a 1209 deed, after Duke Sambor I of Pomerania had granted the castellany near the border with the Pomeranian Lands of Schlawe and Stolp to his younger brother Mestwin I. Mestwin's son, the Pomerelian duke Ratibor (Racibor Białogardzki), made Białogarda his residence between 1233 and 1262.

After Ratibor had invaded the adjacent Stolpe Land, then held by his elder brother Duke Swietopelk II, his castle was devastated in the following fratricidal war within the ruling Samborides dynasty. Ratibor was imprisoned, he later joined the Teutonic Knights in Prussia, to whose he bequested his Pomerelian lands. After the extinction of the Samborides, the State of the Teutonic Order purchased Pomerelia from Margrave Waldemar of Brandenburg in the 1309 Treaty of Soldin.

After the Order's defeat in the Thirteen Years' War (1454–66), the Polish king Casimir IV Jagiellon gave Białogarda with the Lauenburg and Bütow Land in trust to his ally Duke Eric II of Pomerania, who joined the Second Peace of Thorn in 1467.
