= Książka i Wiedza =

Polish publishing house

- Founded: 1948; 78 years ago
- Country of origin: Poland
- Headquarters location: 13 Smolna Street, Warsaw
- Nonfiction topics: Economics; History; Philosophy; Politics; Self-help
- Fiction genres: Non-fiction
- Official website: kiw.com.pl

Książka i Wiedza (KiW; transl. Book and Knowledge) is a Polish publishing house founded in 1948, soon after World War II. As of the mid-2010s it has published over 13,000 titles.

In communist Poland KiW was the leading state publisher of books about politics and history.

KiW now publishes non-fiction popular science books for the general reader, encyclopedias, dictionaries, history, philosophy, economy and self-help books on physical and psychological wellness.

Its popular authors include Max Weber, Karl Raimund Popper, Bertrand Russell, Ludwik Bazylow, Andrzej Zahorski, Henryk Samsonowicz, Nina Andrycz, and Jacek Pałkiewicz.

As of 2014, KiW's editor-in-chief and president is Włodzimierz Gałąska.

== See also ==
- Czytelnik Publishing House
- State Publishing Institute PIW
