= Pomerelia =

Historical region in Poland

Pomerelia: Pomorze Wschodnie (Polish); Pòrénkòwô Pòmòrskô (Kashubian)
- Historical region
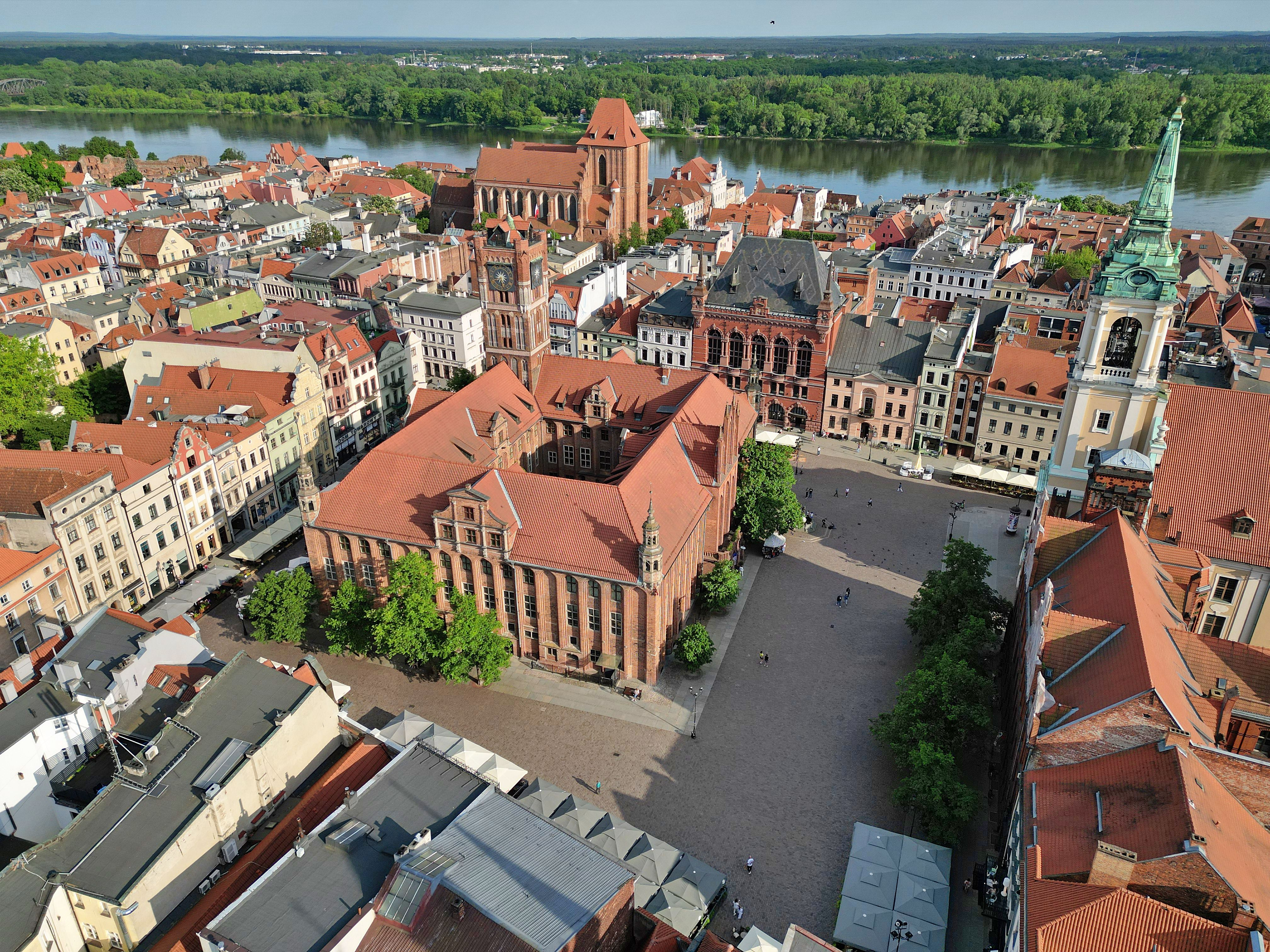
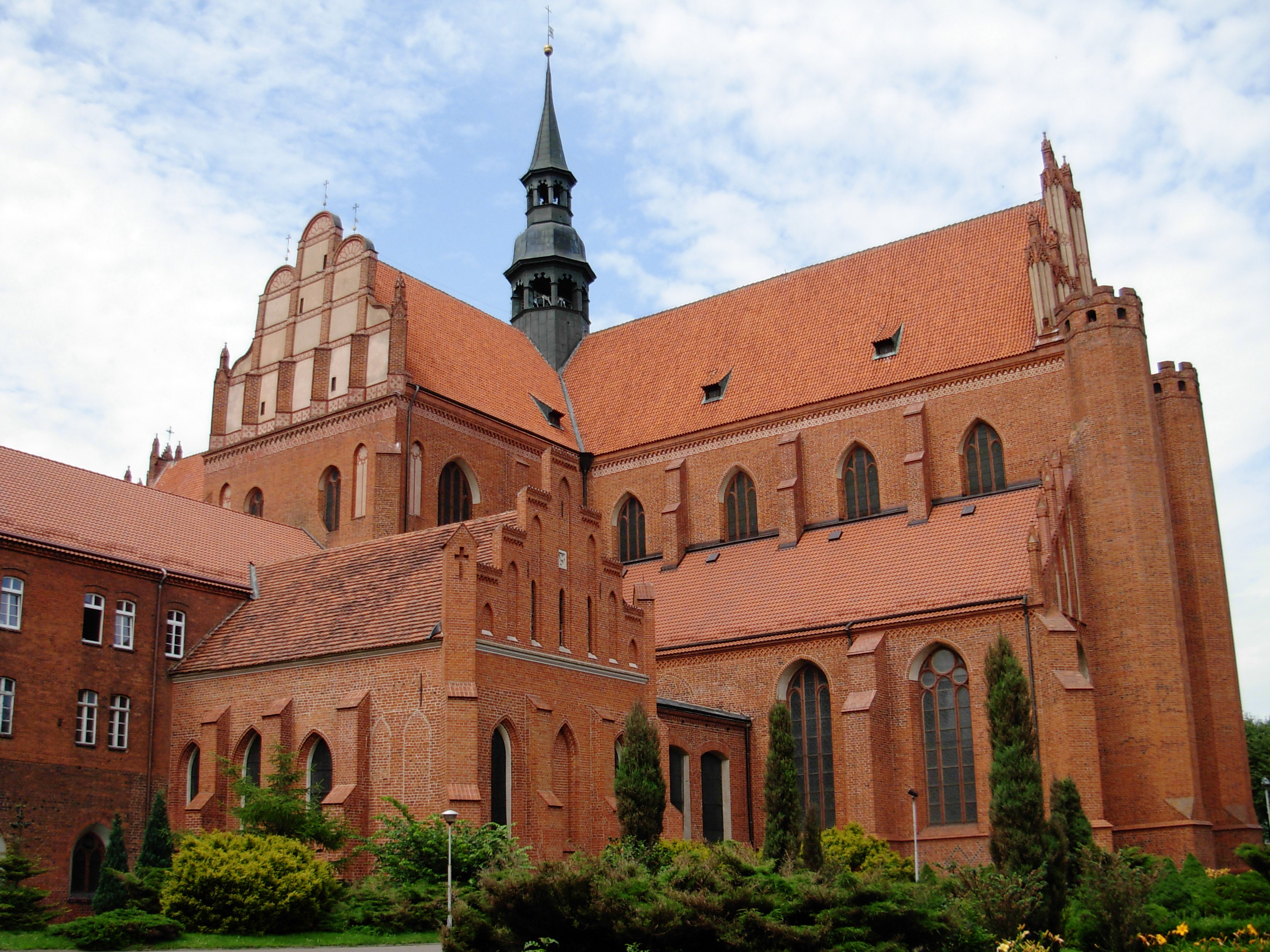
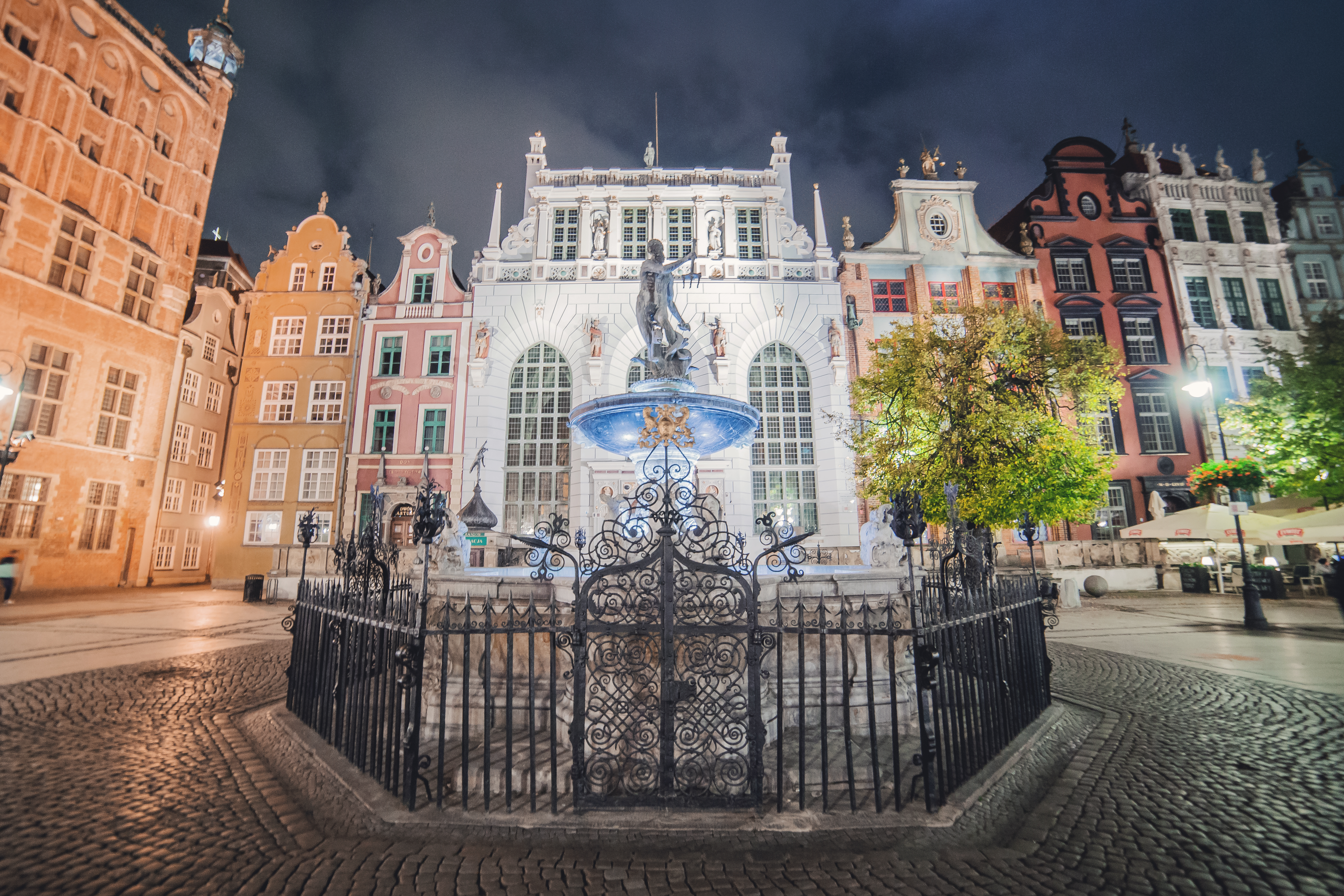
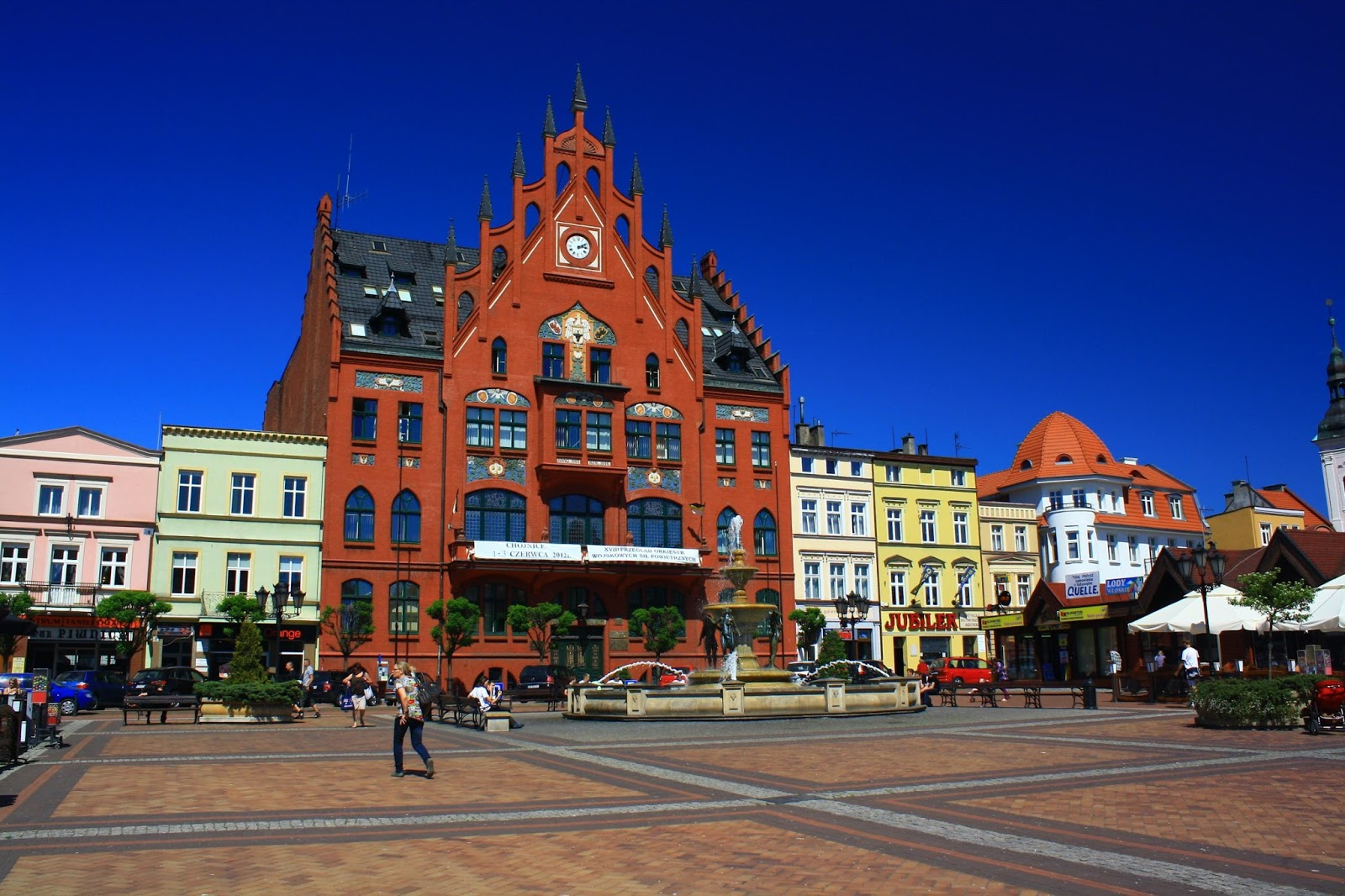
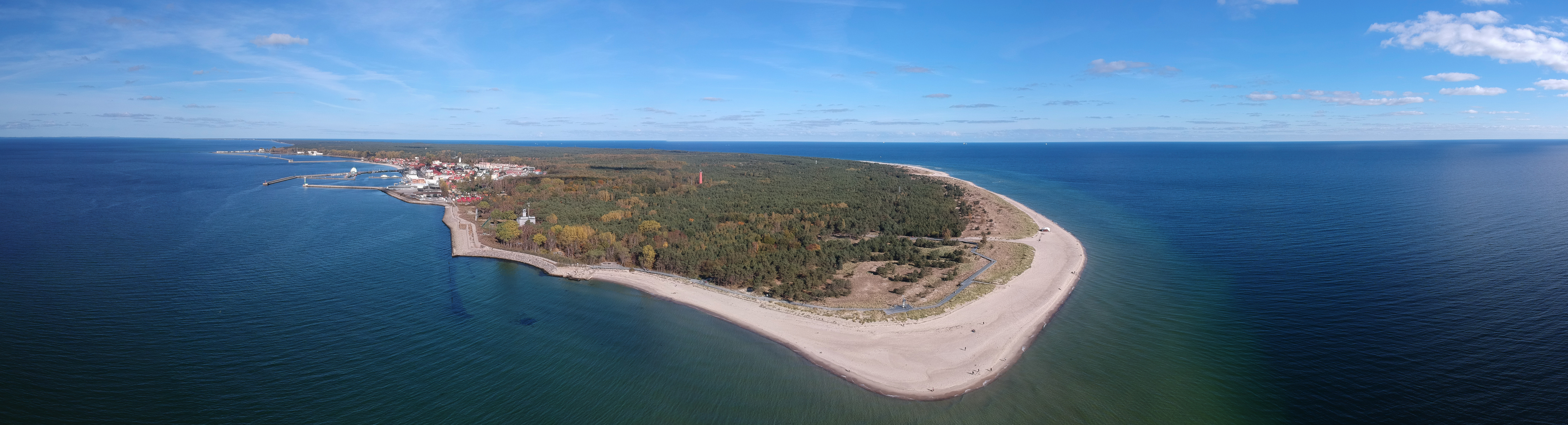
- Toruń Old Town Cathedral Basilica of the Assumption, Pelplin Neptune's Fountain, Gdańsk Town Hall, Chojnice Hel Peninsula

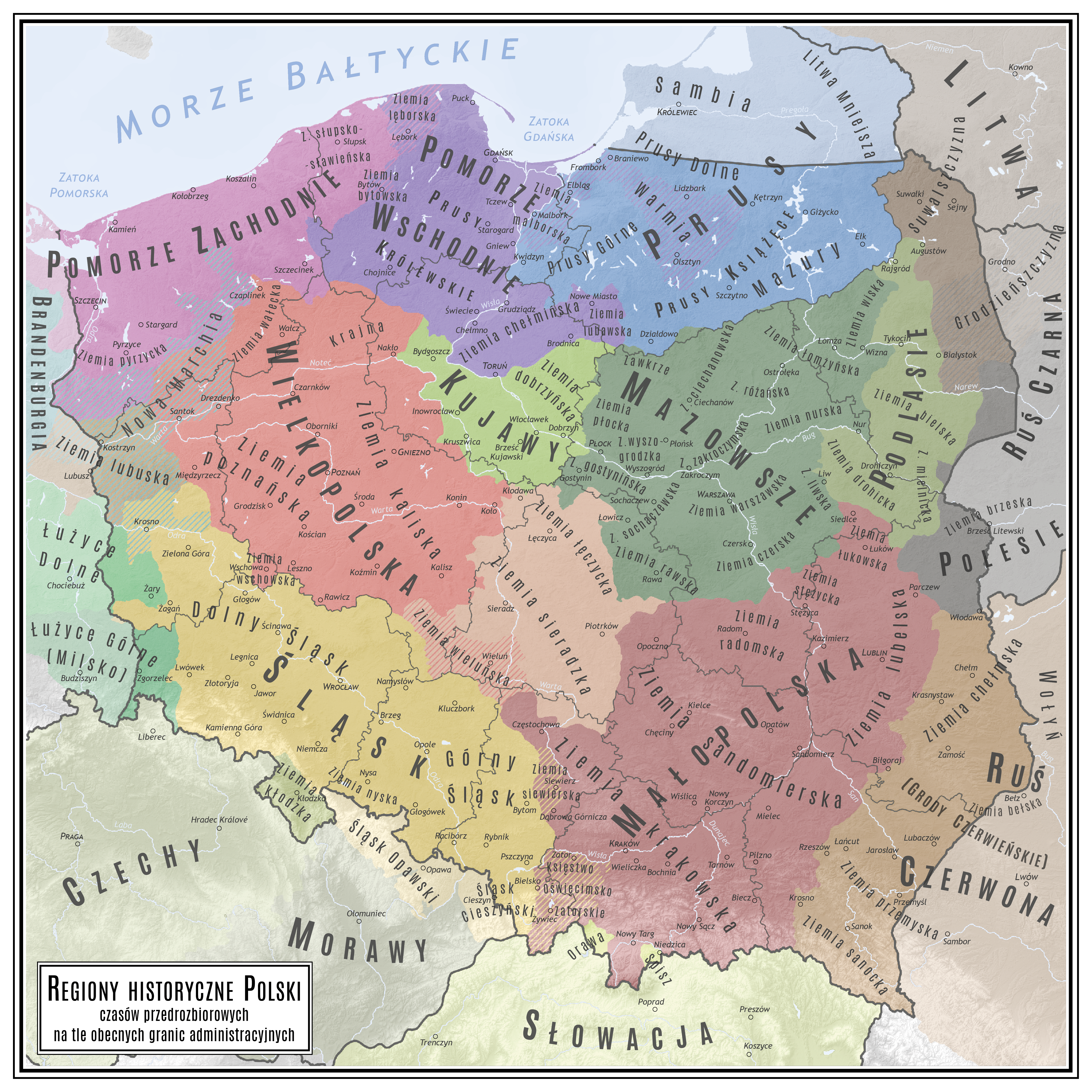
- Historic regions of Poland within Eastern Pomerania marked in purple
- Coordinates: 54°22′00″N 18°38′00″E
- Country: Poland; Russia¹
- Largest city: Gdańsk
- ¹ Russian portion of the Vistula Spit.

Pomerelia, (Note: German: Pommerellen [pɔməˈʁɛlən]; Latin: Pomerellia or Pomerania.) also known as Eastern Pomerania, (Note: Polish: Pomorze Wschodnie; Kashubian: Pòrénkòwô Pòmòrskô.) Vistula Pomerania, (Note: Polish: Pomorze Nadwiślańskie.) and also before World War II as Polish Pomerania, is a historical sub-region of Pomerania on the southern shore of the Baltic Sea in northern Poland.

Gdańsk Pomerania (Note: Polish: Pomorze Gdańskie; Kashubian: Gduńsczé Pòmòrzé; German: Danziger Pommern) is largely coextensive with Pomerelia, but slightly narrower, as it does not include Chełmno Land and Michałów Land.

Its largest and most important city is Gdańsk. Since 1999 the region has formed the core of Pomeranian Voivodeship.

== Overview ==
Pomerelia is located in northern Poland west of the Vistula river and east of the Łeba river, mostly within the Pomeranian Voivodeship, with southern part located in the Kuyavian-Pomeranian Voivodeship and small parts in West Pomeranian Voivodeship. It has traditionally been divided into Kashubia, Kociewie, Tuchola Forest, Vistula Fens and Chełmno Land (including the Michałów Land, sometimes with the addition of Lubawa Land). The Lębork and Bytów Land is considered by Polish historiography a part of Gdańsk Pomerania, while German historiography tends to treat it as a part of Farther Pomerania. Pomerelia has been inhabited by ethnic Kashubians, Kociewians, Borowians and Chełminians, respectively. A small portion of Gdańsk Pomerania in the eastern part of the Vistula Spit around the abandoned village of Polski is now part of the Kaliningrad Oblast of Russia.

== Name ==
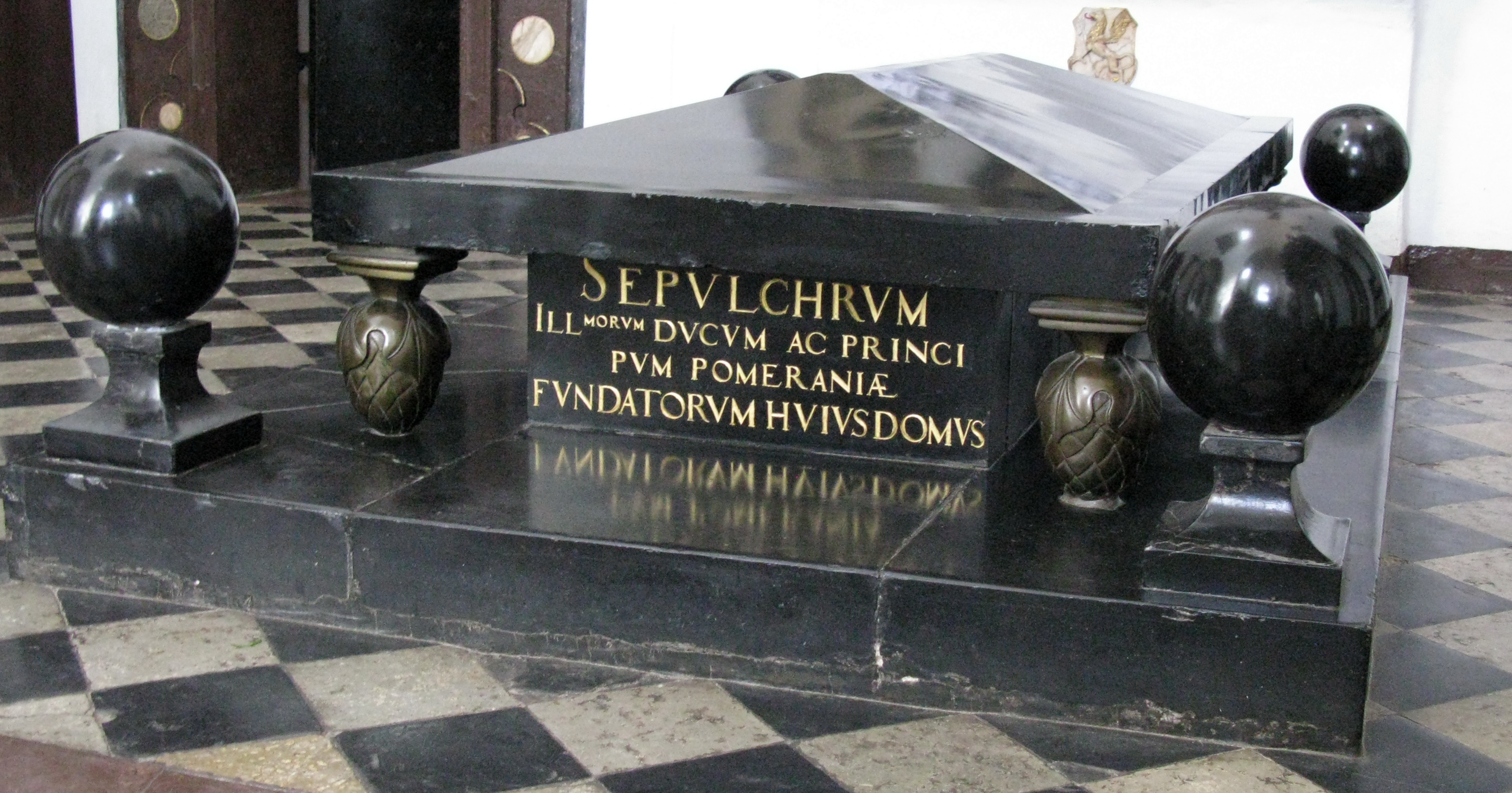
Tomb of the medieval dukes of Gdańsk Pomerania of the House of Sobiesław with the Latin name Pomerania at the Oliwa Cathedral in Gdańsk

The term Pomerelia originally meant small-Pomerania and has been in use since the Late Middle Ages. The name served as a distinction from the regions Hither and Farther Pomerania to the west.

In the Polish language, the area has been called Pomorze ('Pomerania') since the Early Middle Ages. In the early 14th century, the Teutonic Knights invaded and annexed the region from Polan into their monastic state, which already included historical Prussia, located east of the region. As a result of Teutonic rule, the name of Prussia was extended to the lands west of the Vistula river, even though it hadn't been inhabited by Baltic Prussians (the majority of Pomerelia's inhabitants were Poles and Kashubians). The earliest reference of the term Pomerelia can be found in the "Pomerellische Handveste" from 1441 by the Teutonic Grandmaster Konrad von Ehrlichshausen.

The area was incorporated into the Crown of Poland following the Polish–Teutonic War (1454–1466). Subsequently, two names were employed: Pomerelia was used when referring to the Pomeranian Voivodeship (Gdańsk Pomerania) and the Chełmno Voivodeship, while Royal Prussia was used as the name of the wider province, which, however, also included the Malbork Voivodeship and the Prince-Bishopric of Warmia, covering the Prussian historical areas of Pomesania, Pogesania and Warmia.

After the Partitions of Poland, the area was annexed by the Kingdom of Prussia and formed part of the newly established province of West Prussia. The term Pomerelia remained as a historical name for the region, but without any official meaning.

Outside of Prussia and later Germany, the area was termed Pomerelia (such as in the Belgian Theatrum Orbis Terrarum from 1570), Polish Pomerania (Pomorze Polskie) or West Prussia.

The term Pomerelia fell out of use when the region became part of Poland in the 20th century, being replaced by terms like Gdansk Pomerania or Eastern Pomerania.

== History ==
=== Outline ===
==== Early history ====
In its early history, the territory which later became known as Pomerelia was the site of the Pomeranian culture (also called the Pomerelian face urn culture, 650-150 BC), the Oksywie culture (150 BC-AD 1, associated with parts of the Rugii and Lemovii), and the Wielbark Culture (AD 1–450, associated with Veneti, Goths, Rugii, Gepids). In the mid-6th century Jordanes mentioned the Vistula estuary as the home of the Vidivarii. Pomerelia was settled by West Slavic and Lechitic tribes in the 7th and 8th centuries.

==== Early medieval Poland ====
In the tenth century, Pomerelia was already settled by West-Slavic Pomeranians. The area was conquered and incorporated into early medieval Poland either by Duke Mieszko I – the first historical Polish ruler - in the second half of the tenth century or even earlier, by his father, in the 940s or 950s – the date of incorporation is unknown. Mieszko founded Gdańsk to control the mouth of the Vistula between 970 and 980. According to Józef Spors, despite some cultural differences, the inhabitants of the whole of Pomerania had very close ties with residents of other Piast provinces, from which Pomerelia was separated by large stretches of woodlands and swamps.

The Piasts introduced Christianity to pagan Pomerelia, though it is disputed to what extent the conversion materialized. In the eleventh century the region had loosened its close connections with the kingdom of Poland and subsequently for some years formed an independent duchy. Most scholars suggest that Pomerelia was still part of Poland during the reign of king Bolesław I of Poland and his son Mieszko II Lambert. However, there are also different opinions e.g. Peter Oliver Loew suggests the Slavs in Pomerelia severed their ties with the Piasts and reverted the Piasts' introduction of Christianity already in the first years of the 11th century. The exact date of separation is unknown, however. It was suggested that the inhabitants of Pomerelia participated in the Pagan reaction in Poland, actively supported Miecław who intended to detach Masovia from the power of the rulers of Poland, but after the defeat of Miecław in 1047 accepted the rule of duke Casimir I the Restorer and that the province remained a part of Poland till the 1060s, when Pomerelian troops took part in the expedition of the Polish king Bolesław II the Generous against Bohemia in 1061 or 1068. Duke Bolesław suffered a defeat during the siege of Hradec and had to retreat to Poland. Soon after Pomerelia separated from his realm. A campaign by Piast duke Władysław I Herman to conquer Pomerelia in 1090–91 was unsuccessful, but resulted in the burning of many Pomerelian forts during the retreat.

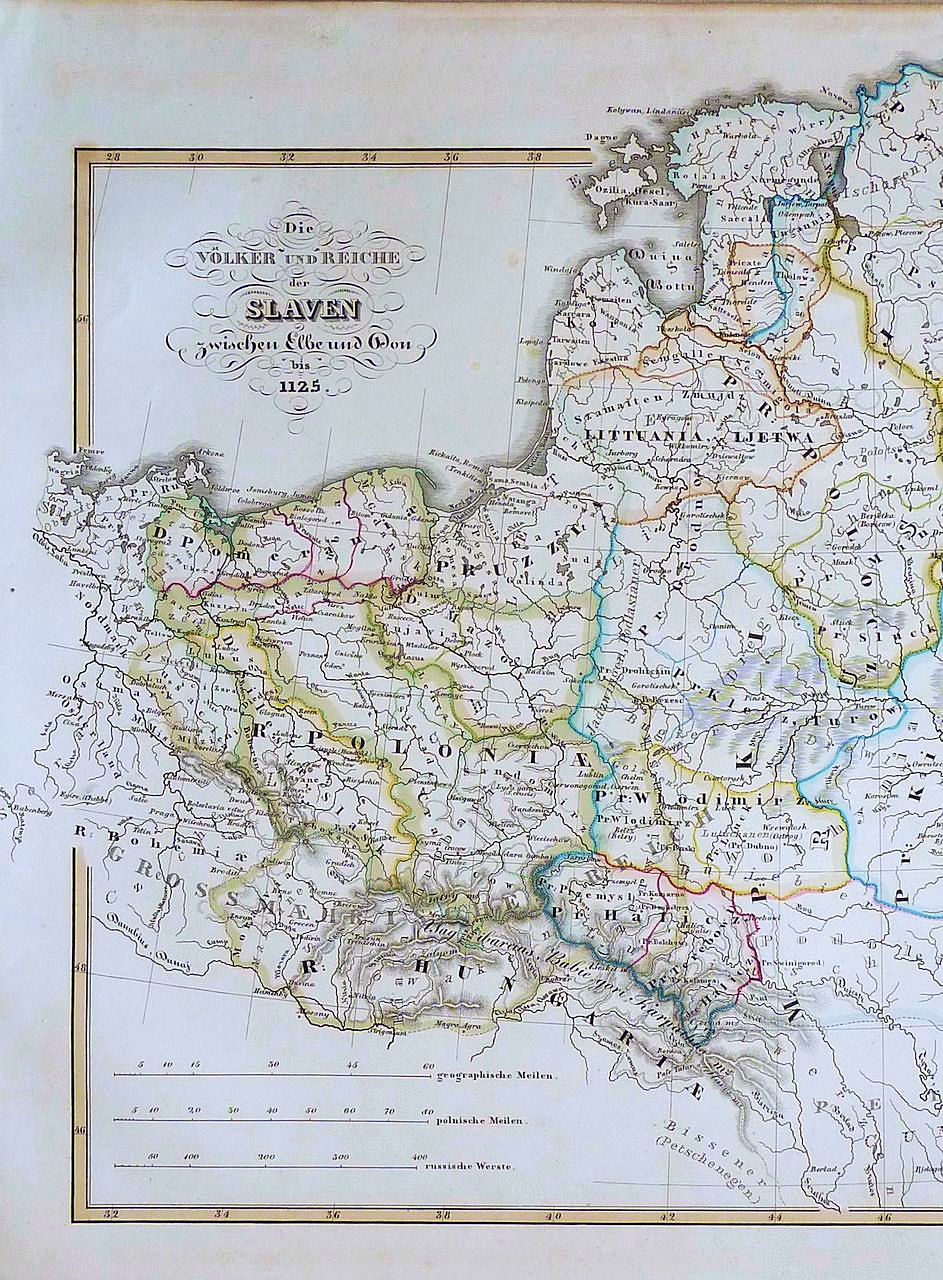
Pomerelia (named M: Gdańsk) within Poland on a map showing West-Slavic and Lechitic peoples before 1125

In 1116, direct control over Pomerelia was reestablished by Bolesław III Wrymouth of Poland, who by 1122 had also conquered the central and western parts of Pomerania. While the latter regions (forming the Duchy of Pomerania) regained independence quickly, Pomerelia remained within the Polish realm. It was administered by governors of a local dynasty, the Samborides, and subordinated to the bishopric of Włocławek. In 1138, following the death of Bolesław III, Poland was fragmented into several provincial principalities. The principes in Pomerelia gradually gained more local power, evolving into semi-independent entities, much like other fragmented Polish territories, with the difference that the other parts of the realm were governed by Piast descendants of Bolesław III. The Christian centre became Oliwa Abbey near Gdańsk.

Two Samborides administering Pomerelia in the 12th century are known by name: Sobieslaw I and his son, Sambor I.

Pomerelia was under the direct ecclesiastical administration of the Polish Archdiocese of Gniezno until the 12th century, when it was integrated into the newly formed Polish Diocese of Włocławek, based in Kuyavia, a region neighbouring Pomerelia to the south, itself a suffragan of the Archdiocese of Gniezno.

==== Danish conquest and independence ====
In 1210, king Valdemar II of Denmark invaded Pomerelia, whose princeps Mestwin I became his vassal. The Danish suzerainty did not last long, however. Mestwin had already gained more independence from Poland and expanded southward, and his son Swietopelk II, who succeeded him in 1217, gained full independence in 1227.

==== Duchy of Pomerelia ====
After Mestwin I's death, Pomerelia was internally divided among his sons Swietopelk II, Wartislaw, Sambor II and Ratibor. Swietopelk II, who took his seat in Gdańsk, assumed a leading position over his brothers: Sambor II, who received the castellany of Lubieszewo (the center later moved to Tczew), and Ratibor, who received the Białogard area, were initially under his tutelage. The fourth brother, Wartislaw, took his seat in Świecie, thus controlling the second important area besides Gdańsk. Wartislaw died before 27 December 1229, his share was to be given to Oliwa Abbey by his brothers. The remaining brothers engaged in a civil war: Sambor II and Ratibor allied with the Teutonic Order and the Duke of Kuyavia against Swietopelk, who in turn allied with the Old Prussians, took Ratibor prisoner and temporarily assumed control over the latter's share. The revolt of the Old Prussians against the Teutonic Order in 1242 took place in the context of these alliances. Peace was restored only in the Treaty of Christburg (Dzierzgoń) in 1249, mediated by the later pope Urban IV, then papal legate and archidiacone of Lüttich (Liege).

In the west, the Pomerelian dukes' claim to the lands of Sławno and Słupsk, where the last Ratiboride duke Ratibor II had died after 1223, was challenged by the Griffin dukes of Pomerania, Barnim I and Wartislaw III. In this conflict, Swietopelk II initially won the upper hand, but could not force a final decision.

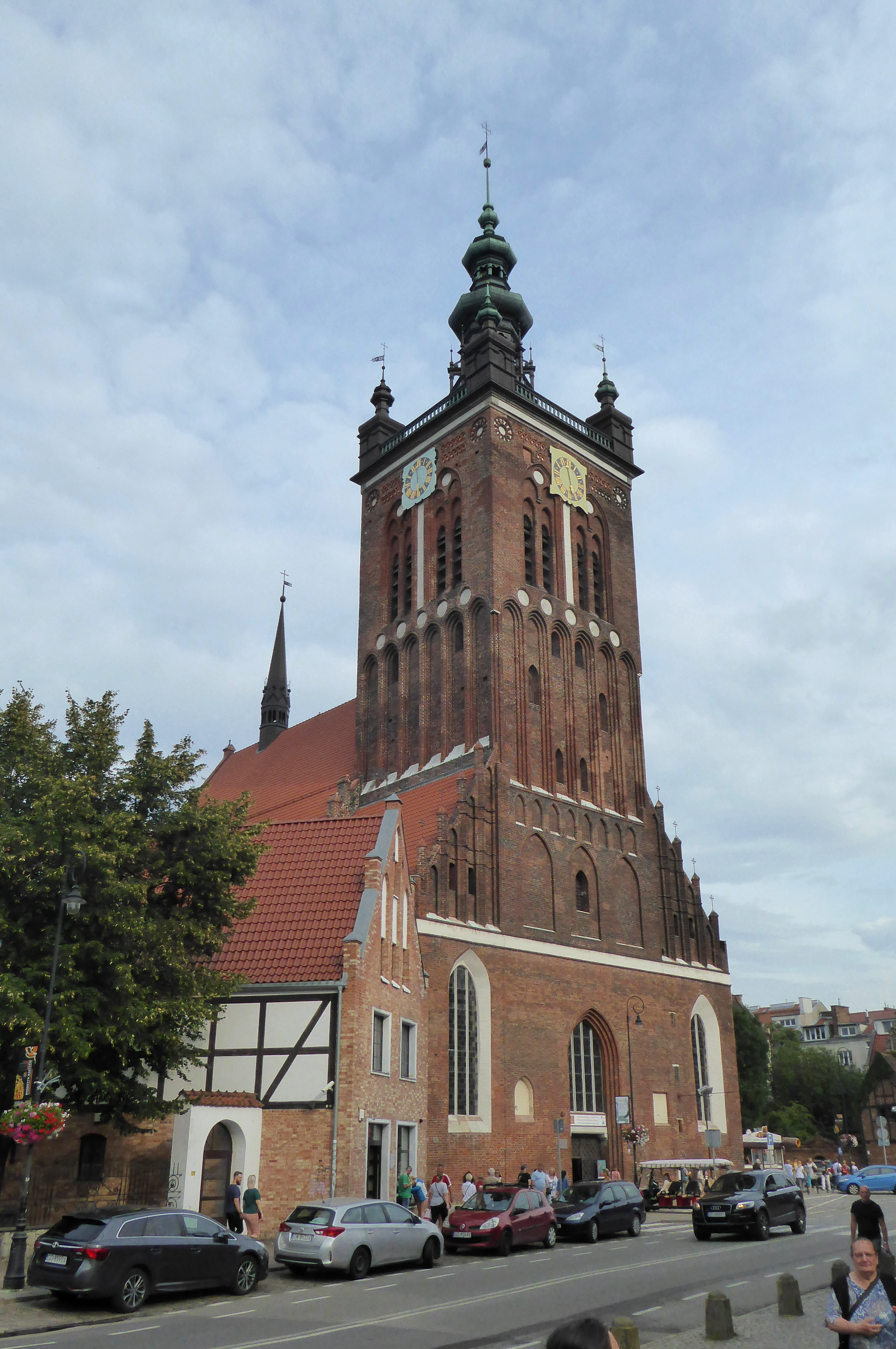
St. Catherine's Church, Gdańsk, completed in 1239

Swietopelk II, who styled himself dux. since 1227, chartered the town of Gdańsk with Lübeck law and invited the Dominican Order. His conflicts with the Teutonic Order, who had become his eastern neighbor in 1230, were settled in 1253 by exempting the order from the Vistula dues. With Swietopelk II's death in 1266, the rule of his realm passed to his sons Wartislaw and Mestwin II. These brothers initiated another civil war, with Mestwin II allying with and pledging allegiance to the Brandenburg margraves (Treaty of Arnswalde, 1269). The margraves, who in the 1269 treaty also gained the land of Białogarda, were also supposed to help Mestwin II securing the lands of Sławno and Słupsk, which after Swietopelk II's death were in part taken over by Barnim III. With the margraves' aid, Mestwin II succeeded in expelling Wartislaw from Gdansk in 1270/71. The lands of Sławno, however, were taken over by Mestwin II's nephew Vitslav II, Prince of Rügen in 1269/70, who founded the town near the fort of Dirlow (now Darłowo).

In 1273, Mestwin found himself in open conflict against the margraves who refused to remove their troops from Gdańsk, Mestwin's possession, which he had been forced to temporarily lease to them during his struggles against Wartisław and Sambor. Since the lease had now expired, through this action, the Margrave Conrad broke the Treaty of Arnswalde and subsequent agreements. His aim was to capture as much of Mestwin's Pomerelia as possible. Mestwin, unable to dislodge the Brandenburgian troops himself called in the aid of Bolesław the Pious, whose troops took the city with a direct attack. The war against Brandenburg ended in 1273 with a treaty (possibly signed at Drawno Bridge), in which Brandenburg returned Gdańsk to Mestwin while he paid feudal homage to the margraves for the lands of Sławno and Słupsk.

On February 15, 1282, High Duke of Poland and Wielkopolska Przemysł II and the Duke of Pomerelia Mestwin II, signed the Treaty of Kępno which transferred the suzerainty over Pomerelia to Przemysł. As a result of the treaty the period of Pomerelian independence ended and the region was again part of Poland. Przemysł adopted the title dux Polonie et Pomeranie (Duke of Poland and Pomerania). Mestwin, per the agreement, retained de facto control over the province until his death in 1294, at which time Przemysł, who was already the de jure ruler of the territory, took it under his direct rule.

The hereditary ruleta of the Duchy included as follows:

- Świętobor, Duke (11th–12th century)
- Swietopelk I, Duke (1109/13–1121)
- Sobieslaw I, Duke (1150s–1177/79)
- Sambor I, Duke (1177/79–1205)
- Mestwin I, Duke (1205–1219/20)
- Swietopelk II, Duke (1215–1266)
- Mestwin II, Duke (1273–1294)
- Przemysł II, Duke (1294–1296)

==== Late medieval Poland ====
After the death of Mestwin II of Pomerania in 1294, his co-ruler Przemysł II of Poland, according to the Treaty of Kępno, took control over Pomerelia. He was crowned as king of Poland in 1295, but ruled directly only over Pomerelia and Greater Poland, while the rest of the country (Silesia, Lesser Poland, Masovia) was ruled by other Piasts. However, Przemysł was murdered soon afterwards and succeeded by Władysław I the Elbow-high. Władysław, sold his rights to the Duchy of Kraków to King Wenceslaus II of Bohemia in 1297 and accepted him as his suzerain in 1299. However, he lost control of Greater Poland and Pomerelia in 1300 after a nobility revolt. These were captured by Wenceslaus who now, after gaining most of the Polish lands, was crowned in Gniezno as king of Poland by archbishop Jakub Świnka. Upon the deaths of Wenceslaus and his successor Wenceslaus III and with them the extinction of the Přemyslid dynasty, Pomerelia was recaptured by Władysław I the Elbow-high in 1306.

==== Teutonic Order ====
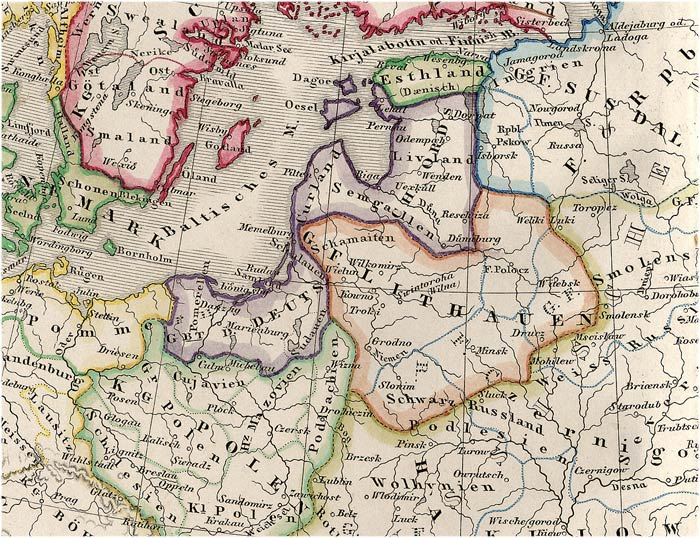
Pomerelia as a part of the Teutonic Knights' state in the early 14th century

During Władysław's rule, the Margraviate of Brandenburg staked its claim on the territory in 1308, leading the local governor appointed by Władysław I the Elbow-high to request assistance from the Teutonic Knights, who evicted the Brandenburgers but took the area for themselves, annexing and incorporating it into the Teutonic Order state in 1309 (Teutonic takeover of Danzig (Gdańsk) and Treaty of Soldin). At the same time, Słupsk and Sławno became part of the Duchy of Pomerania. This event caused a long-lasting dispute between Poland and the Teutonic Order over the control of Pomerelia. It resulted in a series of Polish–Teutonic Wars throughout the 14th and 15th centuries.

In regards to church administration, Gdańsk Pomerania remained part of the Polish Diocese of Włocławek, a suffragan of the Archdiocese of Gniezno.

In 1380, the first Scots settled in Gdańsk, founding what would eventually become a significant Scottish diaspora in Poland. First mention of Armenians, another historically important diaspora in Poland, in Gdańsk dates to 1427.

==== Kingdom of Poland and Polish-Lithuanian Commonwealth ====
Location of the Pomeranian Voivodeship (1466–1772) within the Polish–Lithuanian Commonwealth

In 1440, many cities of the region joined the newly formed anti-Teutonic Prussian Confederation. In 1454, the organization asked Polish King Casimir IV Jagiellon to reincorporate the region into the Kingdom of Poland, to which the King agreed and signed an act of re-incorporation in Kraków. After the subsequent Thirteen Years' War (1454–1466), the longest of all Polish–Teutonic wars, the Teutonic Knights renounced any claims to the region and recognized it as part of Poland. Pomerelia was organized into the Pomeranian Voivodeship, part of the larger Polish provinces of Royal Prussia and Greater Poland. Lauenburg and Bütow Land (Lębork and Bytów) was a Polish fief ruled by Pomeranian dukes until 1637, when it was incorporated directly into Poland.

According to Zygmunt Gloger, during the rule of Sigismund III Vasa, Gdańsk was one of the two largest cities of Poland (alongside Kraków), and one of the three largest cities in Slavic countries (alongside Kraków and Prague). It was the largest port of Poland, and most of its exports (especially grain) were made through the port. Gdańsk and the Vistula Fens were mostly German or Dutch-speaking Lutheran or Reformed, while most of the region remained Polish/Kashubian Catholic. In the 17th century Pomerelia was attacked and destroyed by the Swedish army.

==== Partitions of Poland ====
Pomerelia was annexed by the Kingdom of Prussia during the late 18th century Partitions of Poland, becoming part of the new Province of West Prussia. Following the unification of Germany, it became part of the Prussian-led German Reich in 1871. The region was subjected to Germanisation policies.

==== Interwar period ====
After World War I, in 1918, Poland regained its independence as the Second Polish Republic, and the Treaty of Versailles restored most of the region from Weimar Germany back to Poland, forming the Pomeranian Voivodeship (Greater Pomerania as of 1938). Danzig with the Vistula Fens became the Free City of Danzig. In the interbellum, the region was sometimes referred to as the Polish Corridor.

==== World War II ====
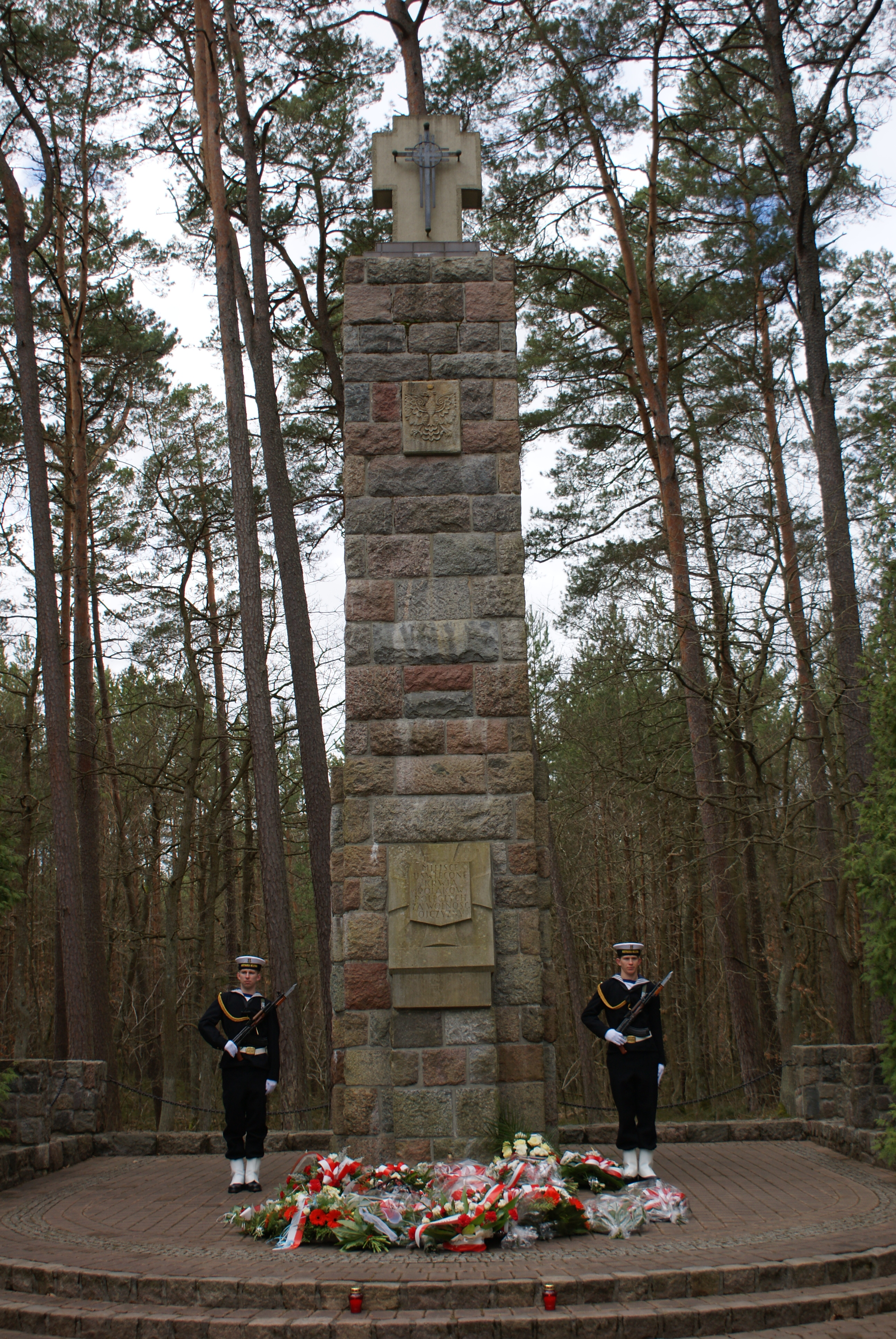
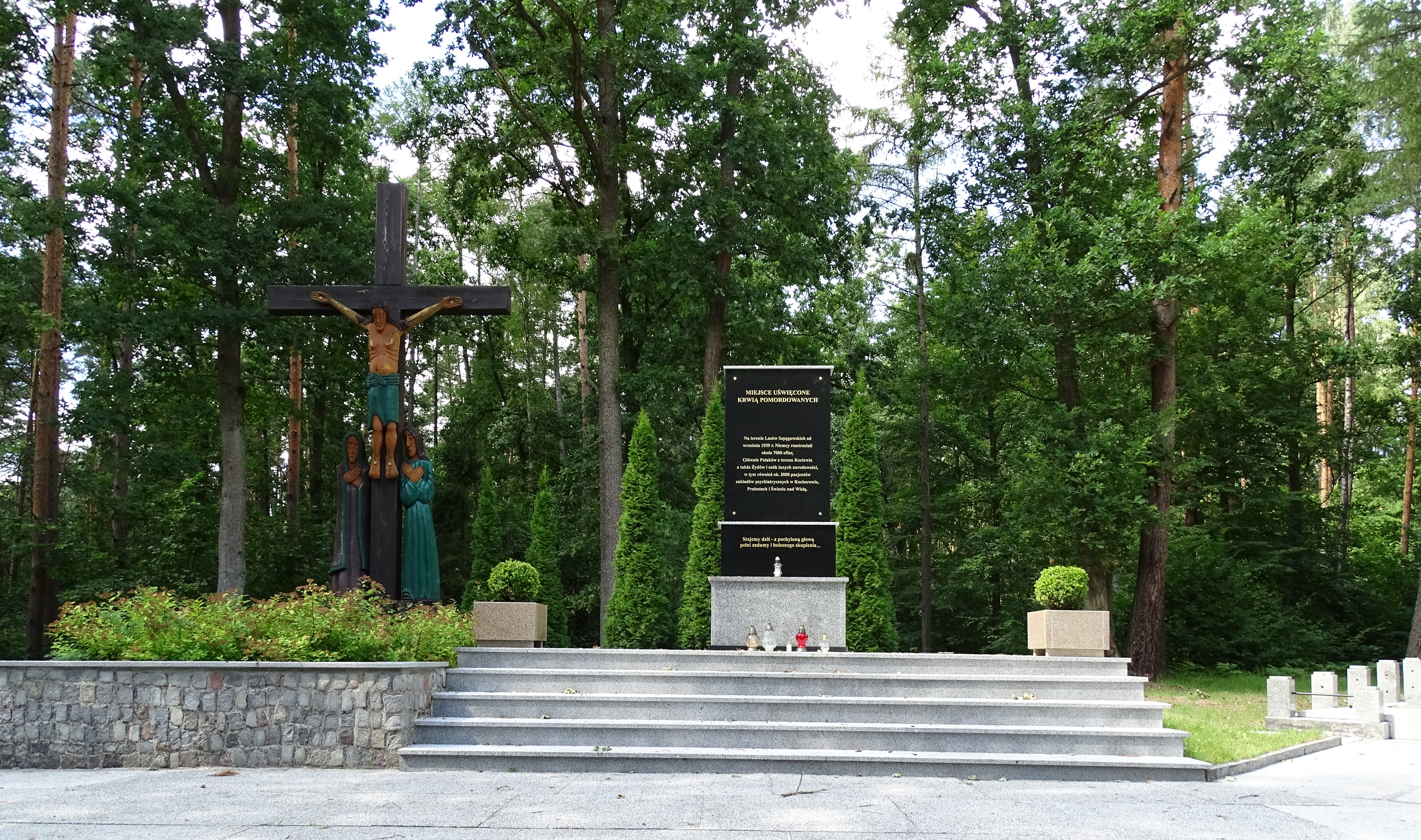
Memorials at the sites of Nazi massacres of Poles in Wielka Piaśnica and Szpęgawsk

The region was the site of the Battle of Westerplatte, the first battle of the German invasion of Poland which started World War II in September 1939, as well as several other important battles incl. at Hel, Gdynia and Kępa Oksywska. Afterwards it was occupied and illegally annexed by Nazi Germany, and the Polish population was subjected to various crimes, such as mass arrests, imprisonment, slave labor, kidnapping of children, deportations to Nazi concentration camps and genocide, incl. the Intelligenzaktion. The Nazis established the Stutthof concentration camp, the first Nazi concentration camp outside of pre-war German borders, with multiple subcamps in the region. Major sites of massacres of Poles in the region included Piaśnica, Szpęgawsk, Mniszek, Igielska Valley, Luszkówko, Skarszewy, Rudzki Most and Grupa.

==== Post-war period ====
After the defeat of Germany in the war in 1945, almost the entire region, including the former Free City of Danzig, was reclaimed by Poland according to the Potsdam Agreement, except for a small portion of the Vistula Spit around the village of Narmeln (Polski) which was annexed by the Soviet Union. The local German minority population which included numerous members of the Volksdeutscher Selbstschutz complicit in its atrocities, fled or was expelled to Germany, also in accordance to the Potsdam Agreement.

==== Contemporary ====
Historic Pomerelia nowadays forms the bulk of the Pomeranian Voivodeship, but its southern part is part of the Kuyavian-Pomeranian Voivodeship, while a small western fragment (Gmina Biały Bór) is in the West Pomeranian Voivodeship.

=== Historical population ===
During the Early Middle Ages Pomerelia was inhabited by West Slavic, Lechitic tribes, with occasional presence of Scandinavians operating a few trading posts in the area. The region then became a territory of the nascent Polish state and continued as such (briefly interrupted by a Danish invasion) into the 13th century.

Following the Teutonic invasion in the early 14th century, the Teutonic Knights committed a massacre in captured Gdańsk, and then supported German colonization. German speakers settled particularly in the major urban centers, where they constituted the majority of the population, while in smaller towns and in rural areas, speakers of Kashubian and Greater Polish (i.e. Kociewiacy, and Borowiacy) predominated. The Teutonic Order developed the land in amelioration projects, dyking of the founding of German-settled estates and villages. At that time, the majority of Pomerelia's inhabitants were still Poles and Kashubians. As the result of the Thirteen Years' War of 1454-1466, Pomerelia became again part of Poland. Dutch and Scottish immigrants, including religious refugees, settled in the region and were mostly assimilated. It was annexed by Prussia in the Partitions of Poland in 1772 and 1793. Temporarily, during the Napoleonic Wars until 1815, Gdańsk became a Free City, while the southern part with Toruń became part of the Polish Duchy of Warsaw.

Administrative divisions and languages in West Prussia, which included Pomerelia, according to the German census of 1910; the numbers in the census included German military stationed in the region, as well as civil clerks and officials. Kashubs who spoke German were considered German. Legend for the districts: German language Polish language Kashubian language others or bilingual

Perhaps the earliest census figures (from years 1817 and 1819) about the ethnic or national composition of the region come from Prussian data published in 1823. At that time, entire West Prussia (of which historical Pomerelia was part) had 630,077 inhabitants – 327,300 ethnic Poles (52%), 290,000 Germans (46%) and 12,700 Jews (2%). In this data Kashubians are included with Poles, while Mennonites (numbering 2% of West Prussia's population) are included with Germans.

Ethnic structure (Nationalverschiedenheit) of West Prussia (including Pomerelia) in 1819
Ethnic or national group	Population	
Ethnic or national group	Number	Percentage
Poles	327,300	52%
Germans	290,000	46%
Jews	12,700	2%
Total	630,077	100%

Another German author, Karl Andree, in his book "Polen: in geographischer, geschichtlicher und culturhistorischer Hinsicht" (Leipzig 1831), gives the total population of West Prussia as 700,000 inhabitants – including 50% Poles (350,000), 47% Germans (330,000) and 3% Jews (20,000).

There are also estimates of the religious structure (number of temples) of the pre-1772 Pomerelian Voivodeship of Poland. Around year 1772 that voivodeship had 221 (66,6%) Roman Catholic, 79 (23,8%) Lutheran, 23 (6,9%) Jewish, six (1,8%) Mennonite, two (0,6%) Czech Brethren and one (0,3%) Calvinist churches:

Number of churches of each denomination and synagogues in Royal Prussia around 1772
Voivodeship	Roman Catholic	Lutheran	Calvinist	Czech Brethren	Mennonite	Jewish
Pomerelia	221	79	1	2	6	23
Lębork-Bytów	15	23	1	-	-	-
Malbork	62	47	1	-	9	-
Warmia	124	-	-	-	-	-
Chełmno	151	11	-	1	1	9
TOTAL Royal Prussia	573	160	3	3	16	32
