= Mestwin I, Duke of Pomerania =

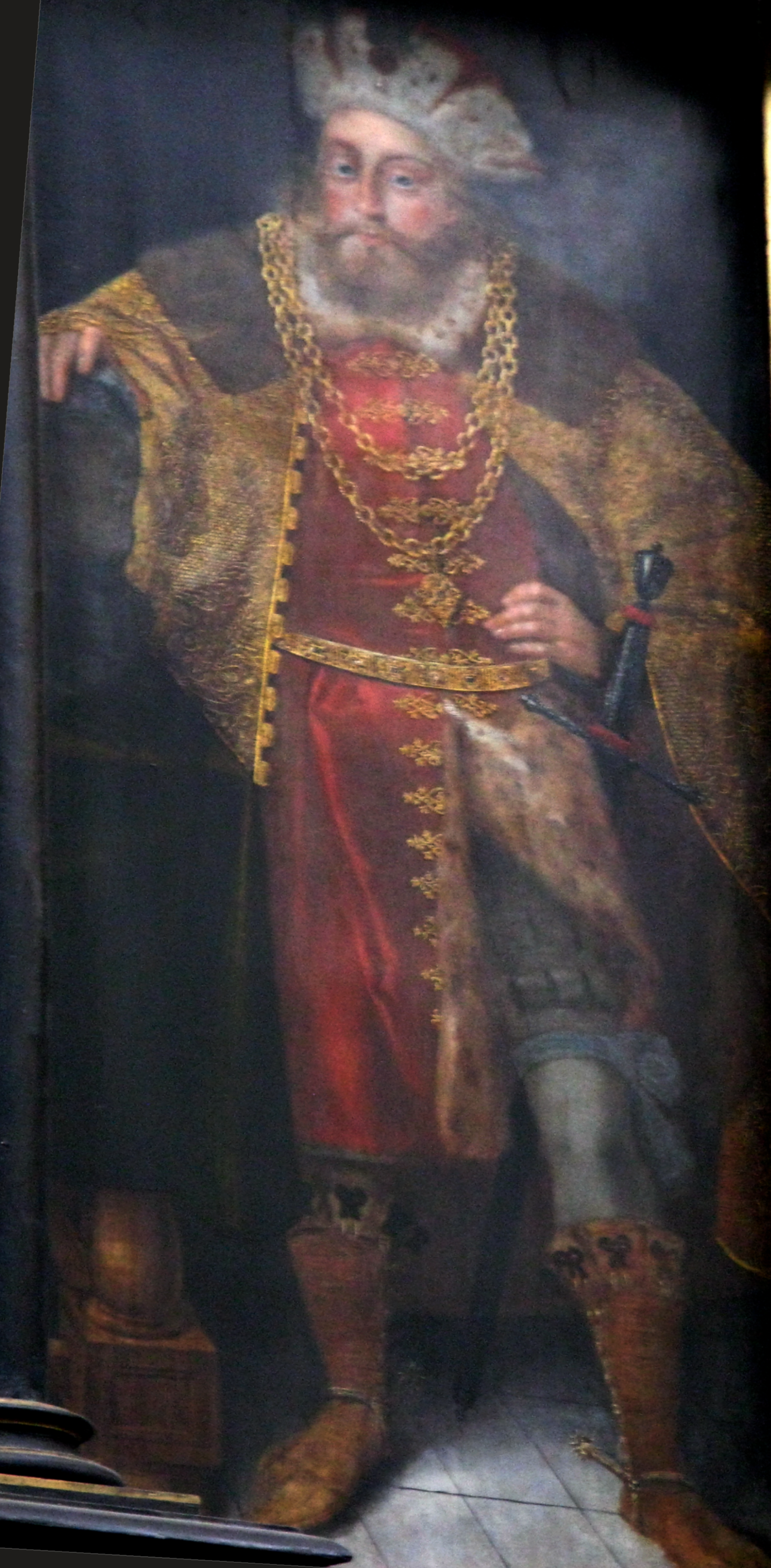
Hermann Hahn: Mestwin I of Pomerania, about 1620

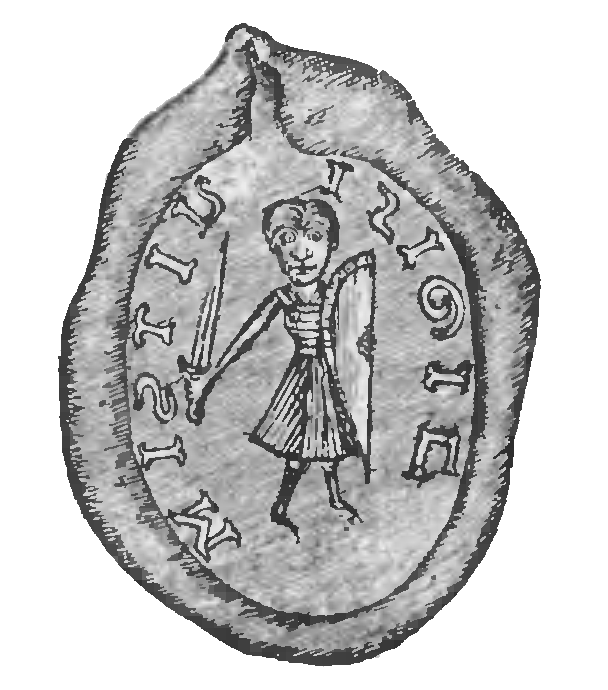
Seal of Mestvinus dux Pomeraniae

Mestwin I (Polish: Mściwoj I gdański or Mszczuj I, Kashubian: Mscëwòj I; c. 1160 – 1/2 May 1219 or 1220) was Prince of Pomerania (styled himself as princeps Pomoranorum) from about 1205 until his death.

Mestwin was a member of the Samborides dynasty, the son of Duke Sobiesław I and younger brother of Sambor I, whom he succeeded in Pomerania. In the tables of Oliwa Abbey, outside Gdańsk, he is recorded as pacificus ("the Peaceful").

As Mestwin I, dei gracia princeps in Gdanzk, he had founded a convent of nuns (probably the Premonstratensian abbey of Żukowo), the castellany of Białogarda at the border with the Pomeranian Lands of Schlawe and Stolp on the Łeba river, and several villages between the rivers Radunia and Słupia. After King Valdemar II of Denmark had conquered the southern coast of the Baltic Sea with Gdanzk during a crusade against the Old Prussians, Duke Mestwin in 1210 had to accept Danish overlordship, but was able to free himself again the next year.

He was married to Swinisława (d. 1240), formerly referred to as a daughter of Duke Ratibor I. They had eight children:

1. Hedwig, married Duke Władysław Odonic of Greater Poland;
2. Swietopelk II, Duke of Pomerania, succeeded his father as Duke of Pomerelia, from 1227 of Pomerelia-Gdańsk;
3. Mirosława, married Bogislaw II, Duke of Pomerania at Stettin;
4. Witosława, prioress of Żukowo Abbey;
5. Warcisław, Duke at Świecie from 1227;
6. Sambor II, Duke at Lubiszewo from 1233;
7. Ratibor, Duke at Białogard from 1233;
8. Milosława, nun at Żukowo Abbey.

== See also ==
- List of Pomeranian duchies and dukes
- Pomerania during the High Middle Ages

== Bibliography ==
- Brown Mason, John (1946). The Danzig Dilemma: a Study in Peacemaking by Compromise. Oxford University Press.
- Hirsch, Theodor; Max Töppen; Ernst Strehlke (1861). Scriptores rerum Prussicarum: Die Geschichtsquellen der preussischen Vorzeit (in German). S. Hirzel. p. 807. "Swantopolk + pomerania"

== Literature ==
- Theodor Hirsch, Max Töppen, Ernst Gottfried Wilhelm Strehlke: Scriptores Rerum Prussicarum: Die Geschichtsquellen der preußischen Vorzeit
- Max Perlbach (1885). "Mestwin I., Herzog von Pomerellen". Allgemeine Deutsche Biographie (in German). Vol. 21. Leipzig: Duncker & Humblot. pp. 503–504.

Mestwin I, Duke of Pomerania Samborides Born: ~ 1160 Died: 1219/1220
Preceded by Sambor I	Duke of Pomerania; ~1205–1219/1220	Succeeded by Swietopelk II
