= Ratibor II =

Ratibor II was a Pomeranian duke. With his death after 1223, the Ratiboride line of the House of Griffins became extinct, resulting in a war for succession in the Lands of Schlawe and Stolp between the Griffins and the Samborides.

Ratibor II was son of Bogislaw. Ratibor II was either a (half-)brother or cousin of Bogislaw (III), grandson of Ratibor I, Duke of Pomerania.
