= Samborides =

Noble family

House of Sobiesław Samborides
- Country: Poland; Duchy of Pomerelia
- Founded: 12th century
- Founder: Sobiesław I
- Final ruler: Ratibor, Duke of Pomerelia at Białogarda
- Titles: Duke of Pomerelia
- Dissolution: 1262; 764 years ago

The Samborides (German: Samboriden) or House of Sobiesław (Polish: Sobiesławice) were a ruling dynasty in the historic region of Pomerelia. They were first documented about 1155 as governors (princeps) in the Eastern Pomeranian lands serving the royal Piast dynasty of Poland, and from 1227 ruled as autonomous princes until 1294, at which time the dynasty died out. The subsequent war for succession among the Polish Piast dynasty, the Imperial Margraviate of Brandenburg and the State of the Teutonic Order resulted in the Teutonic takeover of Gdańsk in 1308.

== Geography ==
The dynasty's dominion, Pomerelia, roughly corresponded with the area of today's Pomeranian Voivodeship in northern Poland. The Samborides from 1227 used the Medieval Latin title dux Pomeraniae; their Duchy of Pomerelia was therefore referred to as "Duchy of Pomerania", even though there was another Duchy of Pomerania to the west, ruled by the House of Griffins, who likewise bore the title "Dukes of Pomerania".

In Polish usage, the term Pomorze (Pomerania) tends to be associated with the entire strip of land on the Baltic coast between the Vistula river in the east and the Raksa (Recknitz) river in the west. Until the Germanic invasions, the term was used as far west as the Morini). The distinction is achieved by the use of Pomorze Gdańskie (i.e., Pomerania-Danzig) for Pomerelia, and Pomorze Szczecińskie (i.e., Pomerania-Stettin) for the former Griffin duchy, to whom the title "Duke of Pomerania" and the term "Duchy of Pomerania" would be used exclusively after the Samborides' extinction.

During the rule of Duke Swiętopełk II, Samboride holdings spread from Słupsk in the west going east across the Vistula River including Żuławy Gdańskie, and in the south bordered the Polish dukedoms of Greater Poland and Kuyavia, the Noteć river being the border.

== Origins ==
The Polish name "House of Sobiesław" derives from Duke Sobiesław I, steward for the Piast dukes of Greater Poland in Pomerelia, while "Samborides" as used in English and German derives from his probable son and successor, Duke Sambor I. According to German historiography the first certain princeps of Pomerelia was Sambor, as the records concerning Sobiesław I stems from the 15th century Oliwa chronicle of the 15th century seemed not reliable. Polish historians however do not share this reservation and have been using his father as the name for the dynasty.

During the conquest of the Pomeranian lands between 1113 and 1121, the Polish duke Bolesław III Wrymouth about 1116 had installed governors ruling in the Pomerelian lands, probably the ancestors of Sobiesław I. An affiliation with the Pomeranian dukes Siemosił and Świętobor or a relation with the Polish Piast dynasty has never been conclusively established.

The most important duke was Swiętopełk II who in Kashubian traditional history carries the nickname "the Great". Swiętopełk received Pomerelia as vassaldom from his suzerain, the Polish High Duke Leszek I the White of the Piast dynasty in 1216 or 1217. Perhaps acting in concert with the Piast prince Władysław Odonic of Greater Poland he benefited from his ally action when they had High Duke Leszek I and Duke Henry I the Bearded of Silesia kidnapped and then Leszek murdered during the Gąsawa Piast assembly in 1227. As a result, Swiętopełk declared himself an independent ruler and dux of Pomerania.

Swiętopełk II was the greatest military commander of the dynasty, having defeated various armies of Piast, Prussian, Danish, German and Griffite invaders during his long reign. He was the first Polish (Slavic) ruler who actively was challenged and fought military campaigns against the Teutonic Order and many times aided the pagan Prussians against the Order and Piast princes carrying crusading campaigns against them. His brothers Sambor II and Ratibor ceded some of their holdings to the Teutonic Knights allowing the Order State to get a first important foothold on the right bank of the Vistula River.

Swiętopełk's son and last Samboride ruler Méstwin II fought various traditional enemies, including the Teutonic Order. As a matter of necessity when fighting for his throne, he pledged feudal homage from a couple of towns to the Ascanian margraves of Brandenburg by signing the Treaty of Choszczno in 1269. In 1282 he concluded an inheritance agreement at Kępno with Duke Przemysł II of Greater Poland, King of Poland from 1295, who upon his death incorporated Pomerelia into the Lands of the Polish Crown.

== Samborides ancestry ==
1. Sobiesław I (Subislaw I), princeps of Pomerelia about 1155–1177/79
  1. Sambor I, princeps of Pomerelia 1177/79–1205
    1. Sobiesław II (Subislaw II), died about 1217/23, under tutelage
    2. unidentified son, died young
  2. Méstwin I the Peaceful, princeps of Pomerelia 1205–1220
    1. Mirosława, ∞ Bogislaw II, Duke of Pomerania
    2. Swiętopełk II the Great, princeps of Pomerelia from 1220, Duke of Pomerelia at Gdańsk 1227-1266
      1. Euphemia, ∞ Jaromar II, Prince of Rugia
      2. Méstwin II, Duke of Pomerelia at Świecie from 1255, last Duke of Pomerelia 1270–1294, ∞ Jutta, daughter of Count Dietrich I of Brehna and Wettin
        1. Katharina, ∞ Duke Pribislaw II of Mecklenburg-Parchim, Lord of Białogard
        2. Euphemia, ∞ Count Adolph V of Holstein-Segeberg
      3. John, died 1248
      4. unidentified daughter, ∞ unidentified Count of Kevenberg
      5. Wratisław II, Duke of Pomerelia at Gdańsk 1266-1270
    3. Jadwiga (Hedwig), ∞ Duke Władysław Odonic of Greater Poland
    4. Witosława, prioress of Żukowo Abbey
    5. Wratisław I, Duke of Pomerelia at Świecie 1227-1233
    6. Sambor II, Duke of Pomerelia at Lubiszewo (Liebschau) 1233–1269, ∞ Mechthild, daughter of Prince Henry Borwin II of Mecklenburg
      1. Sobiesław III (Subislaw III), died 1254
      2. Margaret Sambiria, ∞ King Christopher I of Denmark
      3. Gertrude, unmarried
      4. Euphemia ∞ Duke Bolesław II the Bald of Silesia
      5. Salome ∞ Prince Ziemomysł of Kuyavia
      6. Jolanta (Jolanthe)
    7. Ratibor, Duke of Pomerelia at Białogarda 1233-1262

== See also ==
- List of Pomeranian duchies and dukes
- House of Griffins
- Gryfici (Świebodzice)
- Gryf coat of arms
- Polabian Slavs
- Polabian language
