= Sambor II of Pomerania =

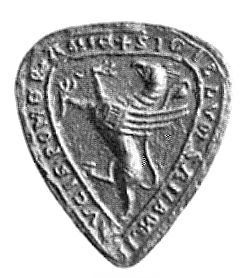

Sambor II of Tczew (Polish: Sambor II Tczewski; c. 1211/1212 – December 1277 or 1278) was a duke of Pomerania and prince of Lubiszewo Tczewskie.

Sambor was a son of Mestwin I, Duke of Pomerania, and a member of the Samborides. He was married to Matilda, daughter of Henry Borwin II, Lord of Mecklenburg. His daughter, Margaret Sambiria, became Queen of Denmark in 1248 by marriage with Christopher I of Denmark. Sambor's only son, Subisław, died in 1254. His daughter Euphemia (also called Alenta or Iolanta or Adelheid) (born c. 1245 – died c. 15 February 1309) married Bolesław II the Horned in 1261. After that Sambor founded a new Cistercian monastery, Samboria, located in present-day Pelplin. However, he was excommunicated in March 1266 for failure to return lands to a convent at Oliwa.

Sambor fought against his brother, Świętopełk II, and allied himself with the Teutonic Order. Sambor willed most of his possessions, including Gniew (Mewe), to the Teutonic Knights. This permanently established the Teutonic Knights on the left bank of the Vistula River. Others, including his nephew Mestwin II, grandchildren and Silesian dukes Henry V, Duke of Legnica and Bolesław the Pious, and son-in-law Ziemomysł of Kuyavia, disputed the will.

== See also ==
- Sambor I, Duke of Pomerania
