= Świętopełk II, Duke of Pomerania =

Duke of Gdansk from 1215 to 1266

Świętopełk II
- Duke of Pomerania
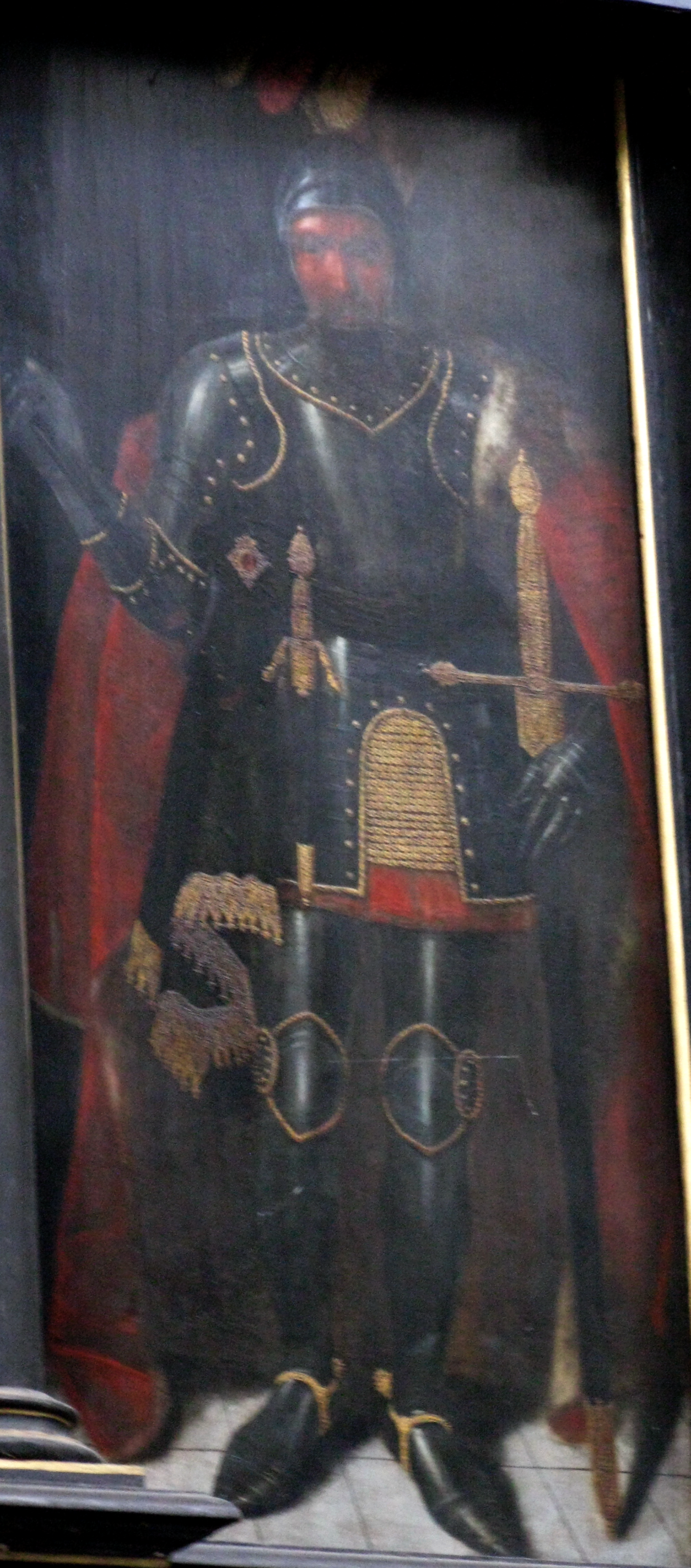
- 17th century painting by Herman Han, Oliwa Abbey
- Born: c. 1195
- Died: 11 January 1266
- Buried: Oliwa Abbey
- Noble family: Samborides
- Spouses: Eufrozyna of Greater Poland; Ermengard of Schwerin
- Father: Mestwin I, Duke of Pomerania
- Mother: Swinisława

Świętopełk II (Kashubian: Swiãtopôłk II; 1190/1200 – 11 January 1266), also known as Świętopełk II the Great (Polish: Świętopełk II Wielki; Kashubian: Swiãtopôłk II Wiôldżi), was the ruling Duke of Gdańsk from 1215 until his death. He was the first member of the Samborides to style himself dux from 1227 onwards.

== Names ==
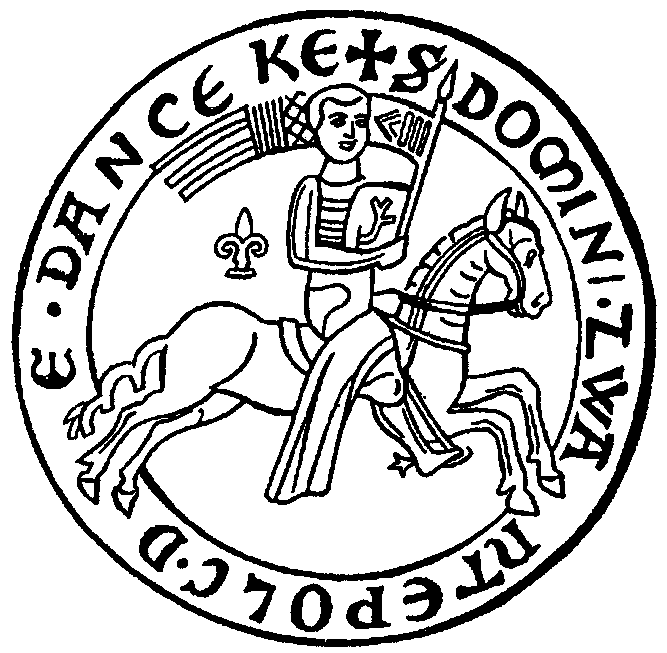
Seal from 1228

The duke is known under many spellings (Swantepolk, Swantipolk, Svatopluk, Swietopelk, Swatopolk, Sviatopolk, Światopełek, Świętopełk, Swiãtopôłk), of which Domin(us) Zwantepolc(us) D(ux) Danceke and Svantopelc Ducis Pomeranie were used on seals.

== Biography ==
Swietopelk was the son of the Pomeranian duke Mestwin I and his wife Swinisława. His father had ruled over Eastern Pomerania (or Pomerania) since about 1205 by appointment of the Polish high duke Władysław III Spindleshanks. In 1216 or 1217, his son Świętopełk was made a steward over Pomerelia by High Duke Leszek I the White of Kraków. He was responsible for the Gdańsk territory, the largest of the four portions of Pomerelia. In 1218, Swietopelk took advantage of a revolt of local knights against Danish rule to occupy the Lands of Schlawe and Stolp. After his brother Warcislaw died without heirs, Świętopełk took over his Lubiszewo Tczewskie.

Upon their father's death, Świętopełk's brothers Sambor and Ratibor were still young, so he acted as their guardian. As they came of age, the brothers received their share of inheritance: Sambor received Lubiszewo Tczewskie and Ratibor received Białogarda.

Świętopełk, who had exploited Piast Poland's fragmentation to gain independence, promised Władysław Odonic the throne of Kraków and Silesia in exchange for his support in the ousting of Leszek and Henry the Bearded of Lower Silesia. On 23 November 1227, on the occasion of an assembly of Piast dukes in Gąsawa, Leszek was killed in an ambush set by Świętopełk II and perhaps Władysław, while Henry was severely wounded.

In 1233-1234, Świętopełk II, with his brother Sambor, joined a crusading army along with Hermann Balk, Konrad I of Masovia, Henry the Bearded, and Władysław Odonic. They proceeded to Kwidzyn (Marienwerder) and refortified it for the Teutonic Order. After this task was over, the crusaders met the pagan Prussians, the Pomesanians, at the battle of the River Sorge. There, they defeated the pagans and were able to seize greater control of South Prussia.

In 1238, Świętopełk conquered the Duchy of Pomerania-Schlawe, whose territories connected Pomerania to Gdańsk, Nakło, and Bydgoszcz. This guaranteed war with Kuyavia. The brothers, over whom Świętopełk was supposed to govern for twenty years, refused to support their overlord after twelve years, and the conflict escalated into a civil war. Sambor and Ratibor were driven out from their lands and sought refuge and alliance first with Piast relatives in Greater Poland, later with the Teutonic Knights, a Christian military order waging a crusade against pagan Prussians. There were also economic tensions between the Knights and Świętopełk. This resulted in an alliance with the heathen Prussians. Świętopełk played a key role in the First Prussian Uprising, which started in 1242.

The alliance between the pagan Prussians and the Christian Świętopełk against a religious order supported by the Pope was unexpected. Świętopełk was previously known as a supporter of the Roman Catholic Church and Christian causes. Eventually, the uprising did not succeed and a peace treaty, mediated by a papal legate, was signed on 24 November 1248. Świętopełk had to return lands seized from his brothers, allow Teutonic Knights to pass through his domains, stop charging tolls on ships using the Vistula, and stop any aid to the Prussians. He kept his word and did not assist the Prussians during their Great Uprising (1260–1274).

After governing since 1220 for 46 years, Świętopełk died in 1266, with his sons Mestwin II and Wartislaw II inheriting his lands.

== Family ==
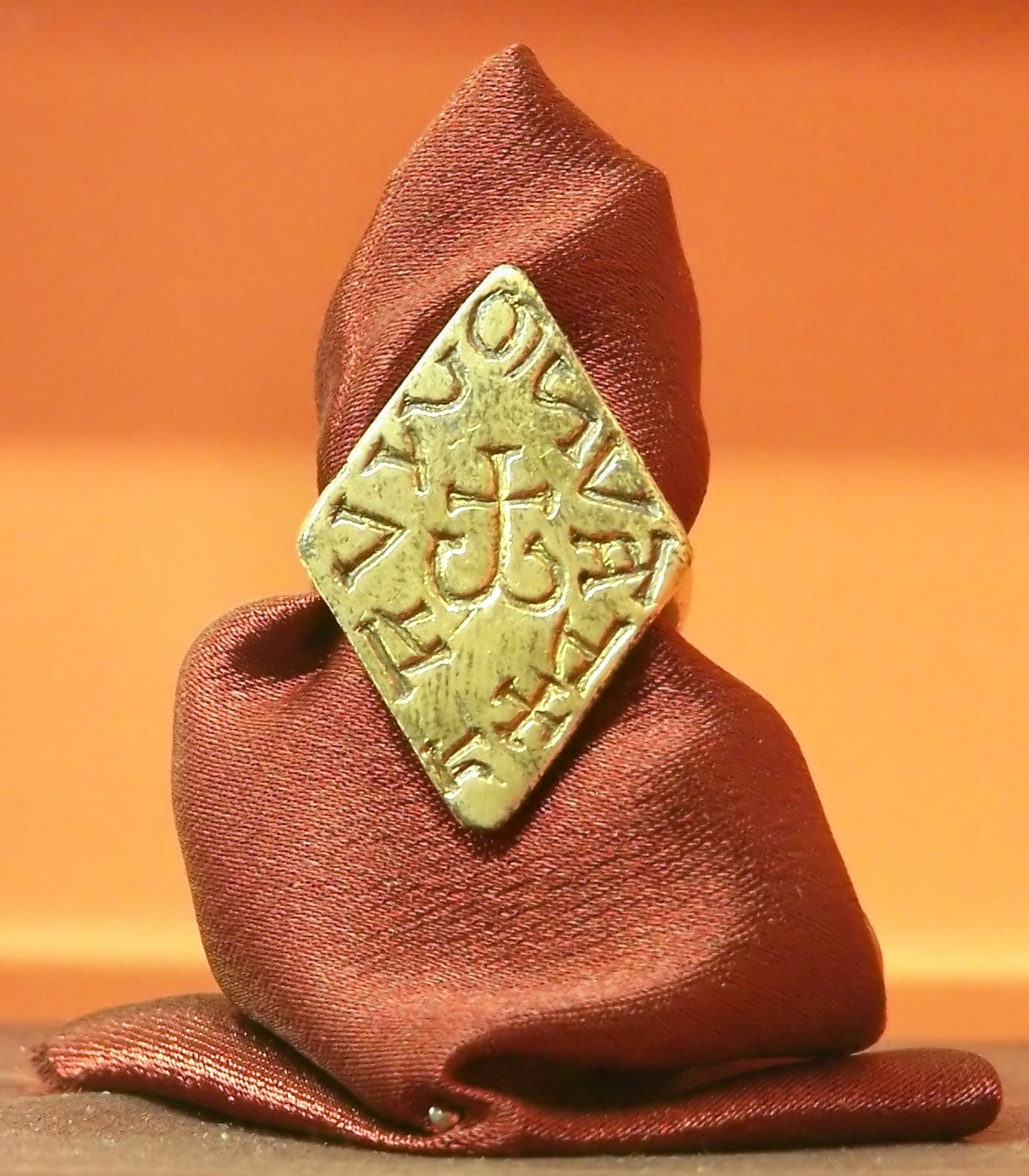
Signet ring

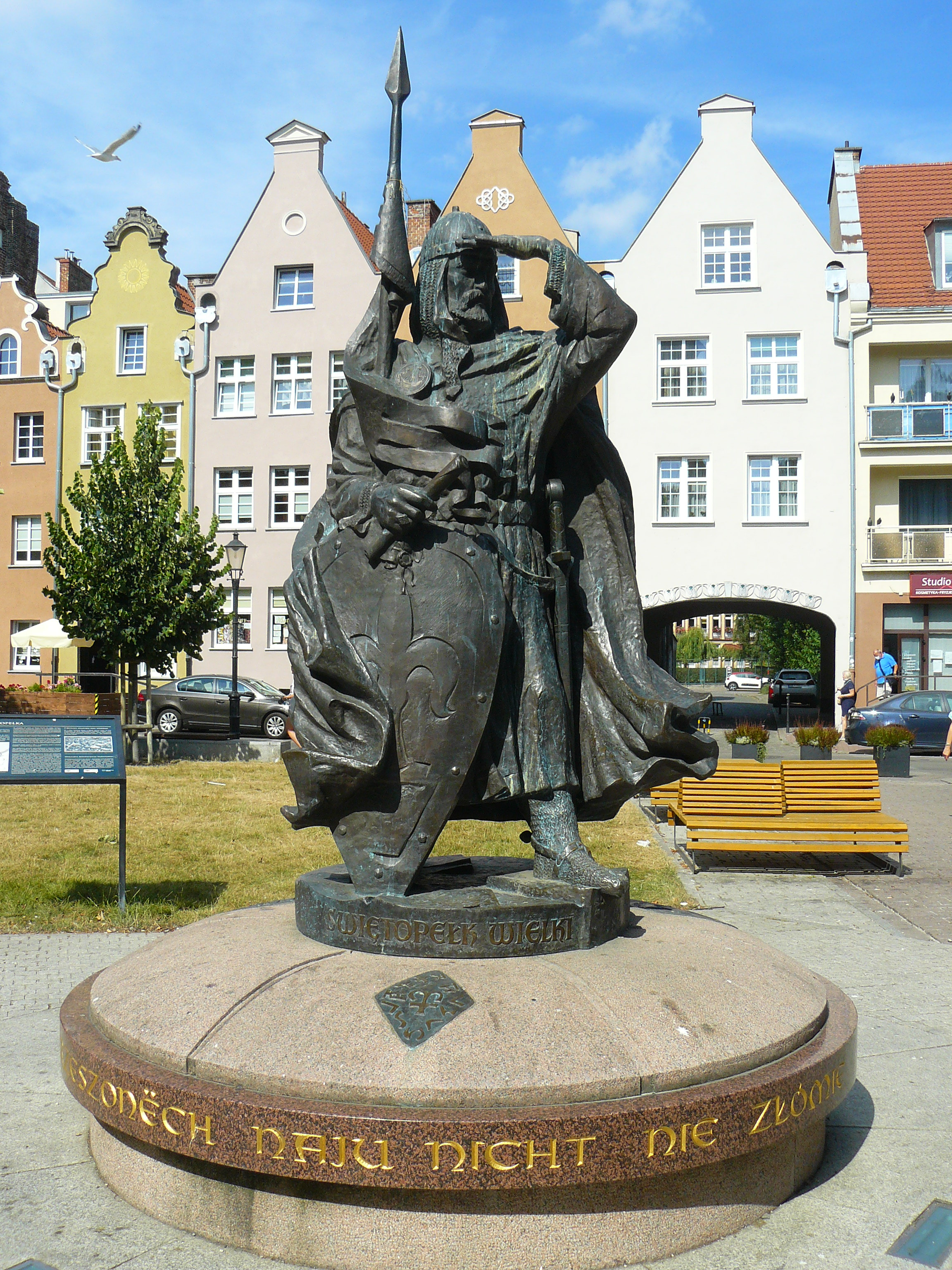
Monument in Gdańsk

=== Marriages ===
- 1217/1218 Eufrozyna († 1230), daughter of Odon, duke of Greater Poland (she was his sister's sister-in-law and half-cousin through Mieszko III the Old);
- before 1252 (?) Ermengarda (Ermengardis, † after 1270), daughter of Henry I, Count of Schwerin.

=== Children ===
- Mestwin II (c.1220–1294), duke of Świecie and later Gdańsk;
- Wartislaw II (c.1237–1271), duke of Gdańsk;
- Euphemia (c.1225–1270), married to Jaromar II, Prince of Rugia;
- John (about 1230–1248) died at a young age;
- Unknown daughter, married to a Count of Kevenberg.

== Bibliography ==
- Urban, William (2000). The Prussian Crusade (2nd ed.). Chicago, Illinois: Lithuanian Research and Studies Center. pp. 185–189. ISBN 0-929700-28-7.
- Brown Mason, John (1946). The Danzig Dilemma: a Study in Peacemaking by Compromise. Oxford University Press.
- Hirsch, Theodor; Max Töppen; Ernst Strehlke (1861). Scriptores Rerum Prussicarum: Die Geschichtsquellen der preussischen Vorzeit (in German). S. Hirzel. pp. 797, 807.
