= Lubiszewo Tczewskie =

Village in Pomeranian Voivodeship, Poland

- Village
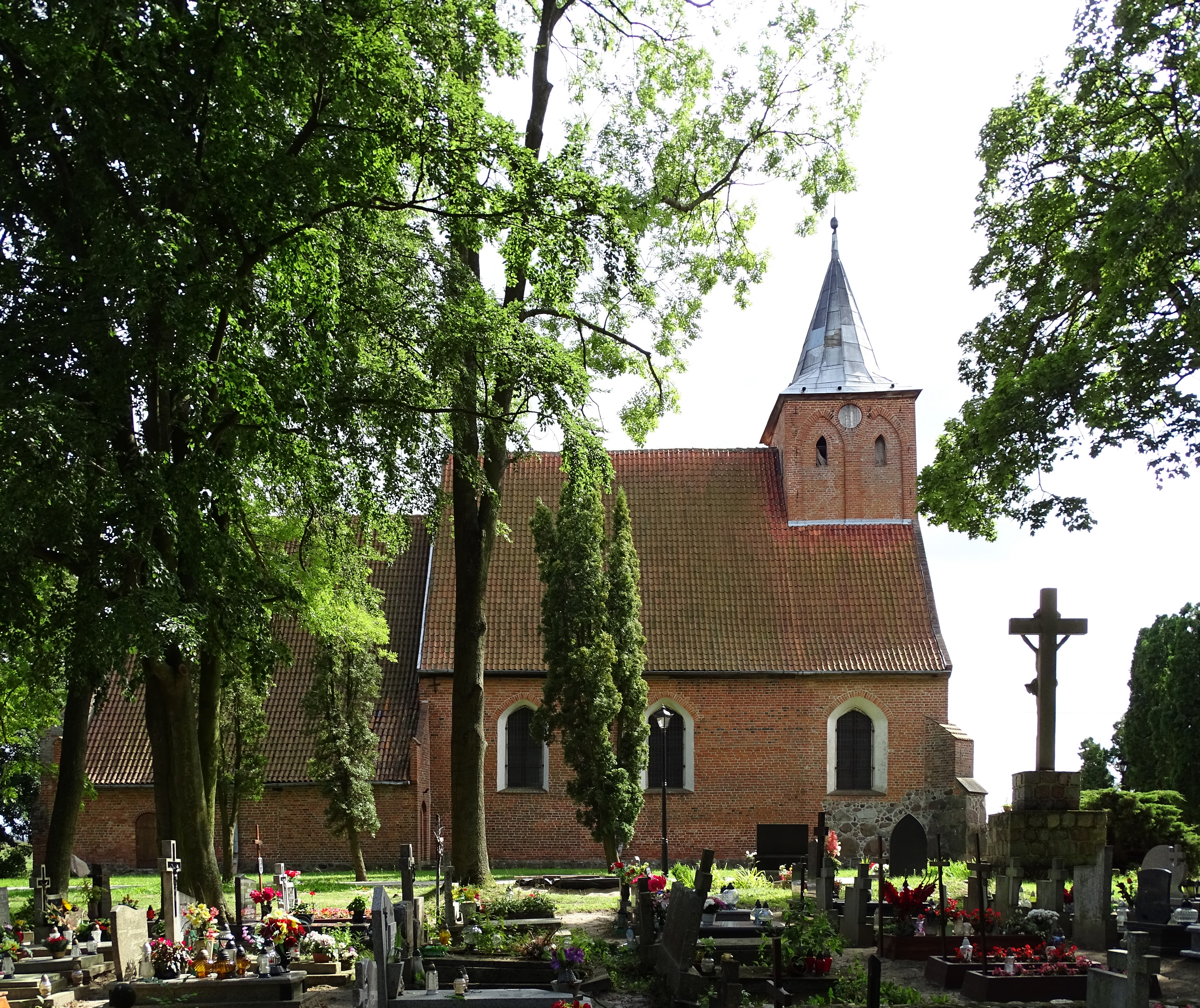
- Holy Trinity church in Lubiszewo Tczewskie

- Location within Poland
- Coordinates: 54°5′22″N 18°42′20″E
- Country: Poland
- Voivodeship: Pomeranian
- County: Tczew
- Gmina: Tczew

Population (2017)
  - Total: 903
- Time zone: UTC+1 (CET)
  - Summer (DST): UTC+2 (CEST)
- Postal code: 83-112
- Area code: +48 58
- Vehicle registration: GTC

Lubiszewo Tczewskie [lubiˈʂɛvɔ ˈtt͡ʂɛfskʲɛ] is a village in the administrative district of Gmina Tczew, within Tczew County, Pomeranian Voivodeship, in northern Poland. It is located within the ethnocultural region of Kociewie in the historic region of Pomerania.

There is a historic Holy Trinity church in Lubiszewo Tczewskie, built about 1348.

Lubiszewo was a royal village of the Polish Crown, administratively located in the Tczew County in the Pomeranian Voivodeship.

During the German occupation of Poland (World War II), in 1941, the Germans expelled several Polish farmers from the village, whose farms were then handed over to German colonists as part of the Lebensraum policy.
