= Czaple =

Czaple may refer to the following places in Poland:

- Czaple, Lower Silesian Voivodeship (south-west Poland)
- Czaple, Góra County in Lower Silesian Voivodeship (south-west Poland)
- Czaple, Świecie County in Kuyavian-Pomeranian Voivodeship (north-central Poland)
- Czaple, Wąbrzeźno County in Kuyavian-Pomeranian Voivodeship (north-central Poland)
- Czaple, Włocławek County in Kuyavian-Pomeranian Voivodeship (north-central Poland)
- Czaple, Podlaskie Voivodeship (north-east Poland)
- Czaple, Masovian Voivodeship (east-central Poland)
- Czaple, Lubusz Voivodeship (west Poland)
- Czaple, Bytów County in Pomeranian Voivodeship (north Poland)
- Czaple, Kartuzy County in Pomeranian Voivodeship (north Poland)
- Czaple, Warmian-Masurian Voivodeship (north Poland)
- Czaple, West Pomeranian Voivodeship (north-west Poland)
