= Kazimierz Eckstein =

Polish teacher

- Born: March 9, 1896; Stryj, Poland
- Died: October 8, 1939 (aged 43); Schwetz, Nazi Germany
- Resting place: Świecie, Poland
- Years active: 1922-1939
- Known for: Activism and improving Świecie

Kazimierz Eckstein (March 9, 1896 – October 8, 1939) was a prominent Polish teacher, scout leader and social activist born in Stryj, Second Polish Republic (now Stryi, Ukraine).

== Life ==
Eckstein was born on March 9, 1896, in Stryi. No information about his life is known between 1896 and 1922, because his documents were destroyed during World War II. He arrived in Świecie in 1922 and became a Polish teacher, full of energy for sports and recreation.

He organized and led the school choir, which achieved high standards at the city and county levels (according to former students). He directed numerous theater performances, such as "The Nativity Scene" by Lucjan Rydel. In 1933, he became the first commander of the Świecie Scout Troop, during which time the Świecie County Scouts achieved significant organizational results. He led the Junior High School Sports Club, the Rowing Club, and the Tennis Club. At his initiative, a marina and a stadium were built at the Teutonic Castle in Świecie.

Below are some of Kazimierz Eckstein's achievements.

- He organized a workshop where students made their own skis, which contributed to the development of lowland skiing in Świecie.
- Eckstein collaborated with the "Sokół" Junior High School Association and participated in the reconstruction of the gymnasium at Primary School No. 1. named after the Polish Army.
- He built two tennis courts and a toboggan run in the school garden.
- He also organized sports competitions for the school championship in tennis, basketball, volleyball, and chess.
- He was the supervisor of the school's LOPP club.

He held a glider pilot license, category ABC, which he used to work with young people. Together with them, he built a glider training field at Marianki and purchased the "Wrona" glider. In 1937, he sent 10 students to a pilot training course, where they obtained category AB certifications. He collaborated with the District Headquarters of the Warsaw University of Technology and Physical Education. He organised district competitions with the participation of the Junior High School Sports Club, the OM-TUR Workers' Sports Club and the Navy Sports Club.

== Legacy ==
On October 7, 1990, a commemorative plaque depicting the bust of the patron was unveiled in School No. 8 in Świecie. On the same day, the school was named after him.

In 2024 and 2025, a few murals were painted in legacy of other activists in Świecie, including Paweł Konitzer. In one of these murals Eckstein was depicted.

== General references ==
- Kamiński, J. (November 1989). "Pamięci Kazimierza Ecksteina" [In memory of Kazimierz Eckstein]. KAJ. Vol. 6. p. 16 – via Facebook.
- Rózio, Franciszek (July–August 1990). "Pamięci Kazimierza Ecksteina" [In memory of Kazimierz Eckstein]. Pomerania. No. 7–8. p. 45 – via Bałtycka Biblioteka Cyfrowa.
