= Babravičius =

- Lithuanian surname
- m.: Babravičius
- f.: (married): Babravičienė
- Related names: Bobrowicz, Bobrovych

Babravičius is a Lithuanian surname. Notable people with the surname include:

- Juozas Babravičius (1882–1957), Lithuanian singer (tenor), teacher
- Gintautas Babravičius, Lithuanian engineer and politician, M.P.
- Vytautas Babravičius (born 1952), Lithuanian country and folk rock musician
