= Bobrowicz =

Bobrowicz (Lithuanian: Babravičius, Belarusian and Russian: Bobrovich) is a Polish surname. Notable people with the surname include:

- Edmund V. Bobrowicz (1919–2003), American politician
- Jacek Bobrowicz (born 1962), Polish footballer
- Jan Nepomucen Bobrowicz (1805–1881), Polish guitarist and music composer
