= Wiag =

Wiag may refer to:

- Wiąg, a village in Świecie County, in north-central Poland
- WIAG, the ICAO code for Gunung Batin Airport, in Astraksetra, Indonesia
