= Grabowiec, Świecie County =

Village in Kociewie

Grabowiec
- Hamlet
- Location within Poland
- Coordinates: 53°26′53″N 18°34′01″E
- Country: Poland
- Voivodeship: Kujawsko-Pomorskie
- County: Świecie
- Gmina: Świecie

Grabowiec [ɡraˈbɔvjɛt͡s] is a forest settlement in the administrative district of Gmina Świecie, within Świecie County, Kuyavian-Pomeranian Voivodeship, in north-central Poland.
