= Dziki =

Dziki may refer to:

- Dziki, Kuyavian-Pomeranian Voivodeship, a village in Poland
- Dziki, West Pomeranian Voivodeship, a village in Poland
