= Żurawia Kępa =

Village in Kociewie

- Hamlet
- Location within Poland
- Coordinates: 53°23′23″N 18°26′31″E
- Country: Poland
- Voivodeship: Kujawsko-Pomorskie
- County: Świecie
- Gmina: Świecie

Żurawia Kępa [ˈʐuravjaˈkɛmpa], known in German as Kranichsfelde, is a hamlet in the administrative district of Gmina Świecie, within Świecie County, Kuyavian-Pomeranian Voivodeship, in north-central Poland.
