= The Poet Max Herrmann-Neisse =

1927 painting by George Grosz

The Poet Max Hermann-Neisse
- Artist: George Grosz
- Year: 1927
- Medium: oil on canvas
- Dimensions: 59.4 cm × 74 cm (23.4 in × 29 in)
- Location: Museum of Modern Art; New York

The Poet Max Hermann-Neisse is an oil-on-canvas painting executed in 1927 by German artist George Grosz. It depicts his personal friend, the writer and cabaret critic Max Herrmann-Neisse. The portrait is exemplary of the New Objectivity artistic approach. It is held at the Museum of Modern Art, in New York.

== History and description ==
George Grosz was a friend of Max Herrmann-Neisse, who was a leading cabaret critic in Berlin. He and Grosz held similar political beliefs, and often attended the same nightspots and also often collaborated in the same periodicals.

Neisse had two portraits executed by Grosz, the first in 1925, with this being the second. He spent many hours at the artist's studio, and more than thirty preparatory drawings were made for both portraits. Neisse is depicted seated in the left direction, in a flowery decorated chair, with his hands crossed. In the left background is shown a table with a kind of still-life, presenting a bottle, a glass and an ashtray with a smoked cigarette. He wears glasses and a dark suit, is depicted sympathetically but rigorously, not hiding his not-very-flattering features, which included a frail body, a hunchback and a large and totally bald head. His physical features are presented in detail.

== Property dispute ==
There was a property dispute between the Museum of Modern Art, New York, which bought the painting in 1952, and the Estate of George Grosz, which claimed its ownership, because it had been allegedly illegally looted by the Nazi regime in 1933. In 2011, a federal judge dismissed a lawsuit by Grosz’s heirs.
