= Oskar Loerke =

German writer (1884–1941)

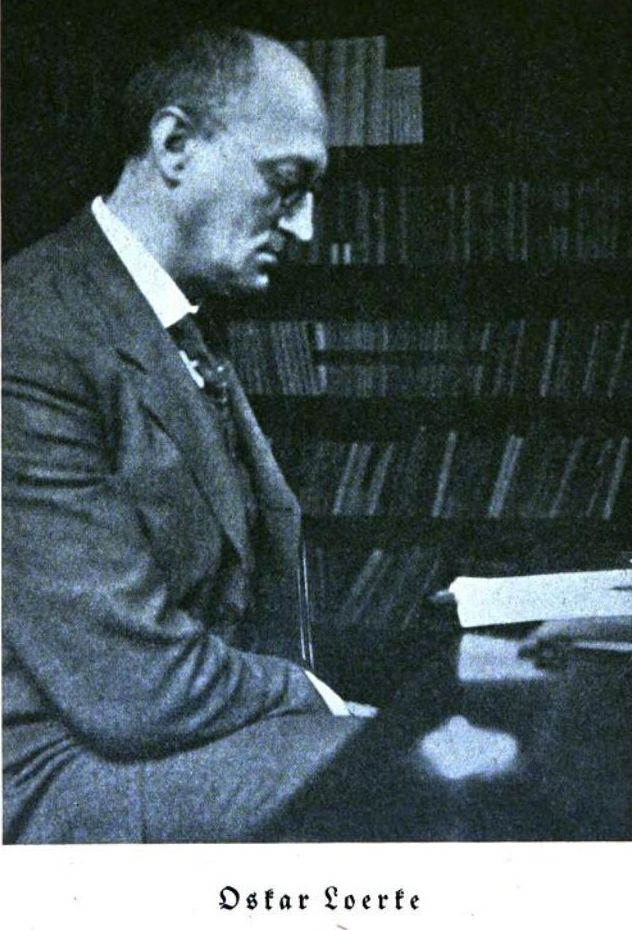
- Born: 13 March 1884; Jungen, Kreis Schwetz, West Prussia, German Empire
- Died: 24 February 1941 (aged 56); Frohnau, Berlin, Gau Berlin, Nazi Germany
- Partner: Clara Westphal
- Writing career
- Years active: 1907-1941
- Genre: Magical realism
- Movement: Expressionism

Oskar Loerke (13 March 1884, Jungen – 24 February 1941, Berlin) was a German poet, prose writer, literary critic and essayist. Loerke was a prominent figure in Expressionism and magic realism in Germany.

Loerke paved the way for nature poetry with his formally strict poems characterized by intense imagery, musicality and mythical traits. His works made a significant moral and aesthetic contribution not only to German literature but also to world literature. Turning to ancient cultural traditions, in particular, to magic as a system of perception of the world, Loerke developed his own special image of the world and his own artistic language, which can be considered as a dialogue between the artist and the era.

== Life and career ==
In 1884, Loerke was born in Jungen near Schwetz (then in West Prussia) as the son of a factory owner. From 1903, he studied history, German, philosophy and music in Berlin, but left his studies in 1906. The same year, he met his future partner, Clara Westphal. Between 1908 and 1912, he travelled extensively in Germany and France and documented his experiences in detailed travel diaries. In 1909, he first met Moritz Heimann, editor at S. Fischer Verlag.

His literary debut came with the short story Vineta (1907). In 1911, his first volume of poetry was published. At age 29, he won the Kleist Prize in 1913 (jointly with Hermann Essig). The prize money enabled him to travel to Italy and Algiers.

From 1910 to 1917, Loerke was a member of the Donnerstags-Gesellschaft ("Thursday Society") in Berlin, a circle for artists and intellects to discuss literature, music and painting. In 1917, Loerke joined S. Fischer Verlag as an editor and got to know the authors of the publishing house, including Thomas Mann. After World War I, he became an enthusiastic supporter of Max Herrmann-Neiße and Walter Rheiner.

Between 1920 and 1928, Loerke contributed numerous articles and reviews to the newspaper Berliner Börsen-Courier. Between 1929 and 1932, he also contributed to the literary journal Die Kolonne, which was open to nature poetry.

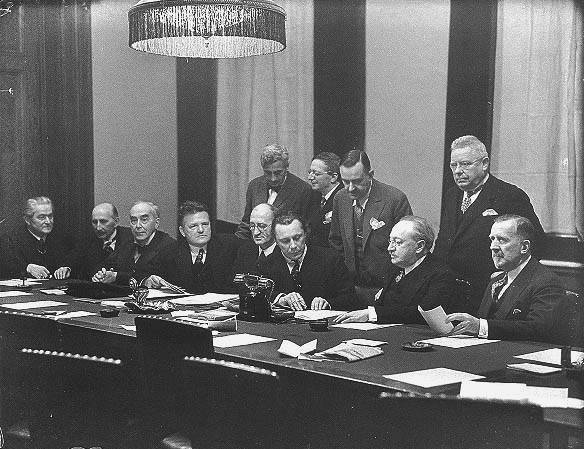
Loerke (seated 5th from the right) at the Prussian Academy of Arts, 1929

In 1926, he became a member of the Prussian Academy of Arts. In 1928, he received a paid position as secretary of the Academy's poetry division. His love of music is evident in his writings on Johann Sebastian Bach and Anton Bruckner.

In 1933, Loerke, who opposed Nazism, was expelled from the Prussian Academy of Arts. However, later that year, he had signed the Gelöbnis treuester Gefolgschaft ("pledge of the most loyal followers"), a declaration of allegiance to Hitler, reportedly to protect his Jewish publisher Samuel von Fischer. He was then reinstated in the purged German Academy of Poetry, a sub-department the Prussian Academy of Arts.

Loerke retreated to his house in Frohnau, Berlin, and remained as chief editor of S. Fischer Verlag, which he tried to defend against ever new repressions and censorship measures. His volumes of poetry, Der Silberdistelwald (1934), Der Wald der Welt (1936) and Der Steinpfad (1938), established his reputation as a poet of inner emigration and representative of the naturmagischen Schule (Natural Magic School).

In 1940, few months before his death, Loerke wrote an obituary for his former friend, Silesian poet and National Socialist Hermann Stehr, which was published in the newspaper Das Reich. This later caused confusion, as some mistook Loerke for a supporter of the newspaper controlled by the Ministry of Propaganda.

Oskar Loerke died of heart failure in Frohnau in 1941 was buried in the Frohnau Cemetery. His grave was recognized as one of Berlin's Ehrengraeber ("honor grave") until 2021, and after public outcry, its maintenance was extended by the Senate of Berlin for another twenty years. Hermann Kasack, a lifelong friend of Loerke, published many of his works posthumously.

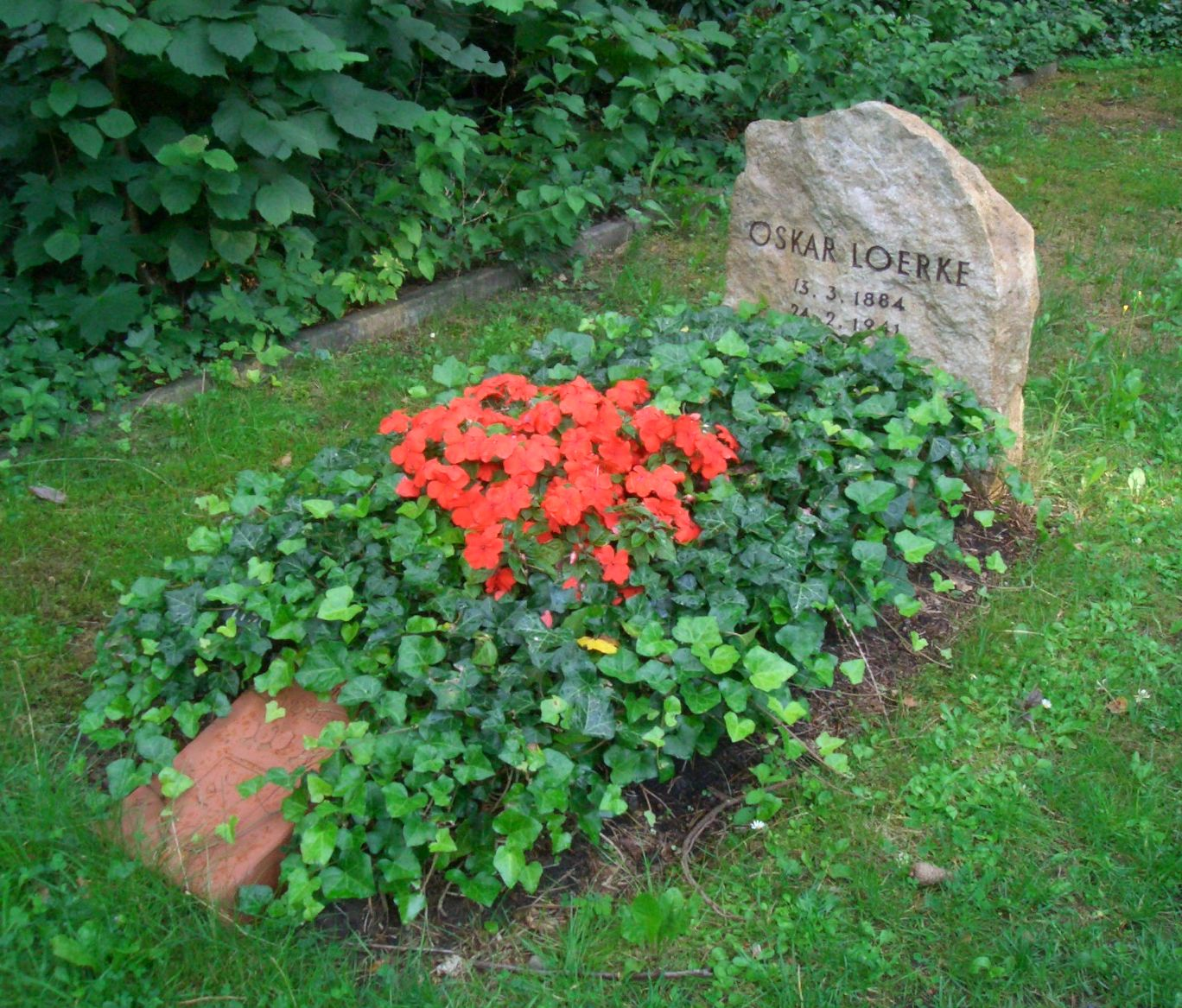
Grave of Oskar Loerke

== Works ==
=== Poems ===
- 1911 Wanderschaft (contains Blauer Abend in Berlin)
- 1916 Gedichte (the second edition in 1929 was published under the title Pansmusik)
- 1921 Die heimliche Stadt
- 1926 Der längste Tag
- 1930 Atem der Erde. Sieben Gedichtkreise
- 1934 Der Silberdistelwald
- 1936 Der Wald der Welt
- 1938 Magische Verse (collected and introduced by Peter Suhrkamp)
- 1939 Kärntner Sommer (published as a manuscript and in few copies by Victor Otto Stomps)
- 1941 Der Steinpfad. (first appeared in 1938 as a manuscript and in few copies by Stomps)
- 1949 Die Abschiedshand (posthumous)

=== Novels and stories ===
- 1907 Vineta
- 1909 Franz Pfinz
- 1910 Der Turmbau
- 1919 Das Goldbergwerk
- 1919 Chimärenreiter
- 1919 Der Prinz und der Tiger
- 1921 Der Oger.

=== Literary essays and reviews ===
- 1922 Wandlungen eines Gedankens über die Musik und ihren Gegenstand (on J. S. Bach)
- 1925 Zeitgenossen aus vielen Zeiten
- 1928 Formprobleme der Lyrik
- 1935 Das unsichtbare Reich (on J. S. Bach)
- 1933 Die arme Öffentlichkeit des Dichters
- 1935 Das alte Wagnis des Gedichtes
- 1938 Anton Bruckner. Ein Charakterbild
- 1939 Hausfreunde. Charakterbilder

== Bibliography ==
- Hermann Kasack: Loerke, Charakterbild eines Dichters. Akademie der Wissenschaften und der Literatur in Mainz. Abhandlungen der Klasse der Literatur. Band 2. Wiesbaden 1951.
- Oskar Loerke 1884–1964. Katalog: Eine Gedächtnisausstellung zum 80. Geburtstag des Dichters im Schiller-Nationalmuseum. Marbach am Neckar 1964.
- Norbert Langer: Bin ein Reim zu allen Dingen. Die Riesengebirgsreisen Oskar Loerkes. In: Sudetenland. H. 1, 1980, S. 46–51.
- Jochen Meyer: Gegenwelten: Eugen Gottlob Winkler, Gottfried Benn, Oskar Loerke. In: Klassiker in finsteren Zeiten: 1933–1945. Eine Ausstellung des Deutschen Literaturarchivs im Schiller-Nationalmuseum Marbach am Neckar, 14. Mai – 31. Oktober 1983. Band 2. 1983, S. 182–203. (Marbacher Kataloge. 38.)
- Hans Dieter Schäfer: Oskar Loerke: Winterliches Vogelfüttern. In: Gedichte und Interpretationen. Band 5: Harald Hartung (Hrsg.): Vom Naturalismus bis zur Jahrhundertmitte. Philipp Reclam jun., Stuttgart 1983
