= Niedźwiedź =

Niedźwiedź (lit. bear) may refer to the following places in Poland:

- Niedźwiedź, Greater Poland Voivodeship (west-central Poland)
- Niedźwiedź, Lipno County in Kuyavian-Pomeranian Voivodeship (north-central Poland)
- Niedźwiedź, Świecie County in Kuyavian-Pomeranian Voivodeship (north-central Poland)
- Niedźwiedź, Wąbrzeźno County in Kuyavian-Pomeranian Voivodeship (north-central Poland)
- Niedźwiedź, Kraków County in Lesser Poland Voivodeship (south Poland)
- Niedźwiedź, Limanowa County in Lesser Poland Voivodeship (south Poland)
- Niedźwiedź, Lower Silesian Voivodeship (south-west Poland)
- Niedźwiedź, Lublin Voivodeship (east Poland)
- Niedźwiedź, Lubusz Voivodeship (west Poland)
- Niedźwiedź, Masovian Voivodeship (east-central Poland)
- Niedźwiedź, Kielce County in Świętokrzyskie Voivodeship (south-central Poland)
- Niedźwiedź, Staszów County in Świętokrzyskie Voivodeship (south-central Poland)
- Niedźwiedź, Warmian-Masurian Voivodeship (north Poland)
- Niedźwiedź, West Pomeranian Voivodeship (north-west Poland)
