= Aurel Krause =

German geographer (1848–1908)

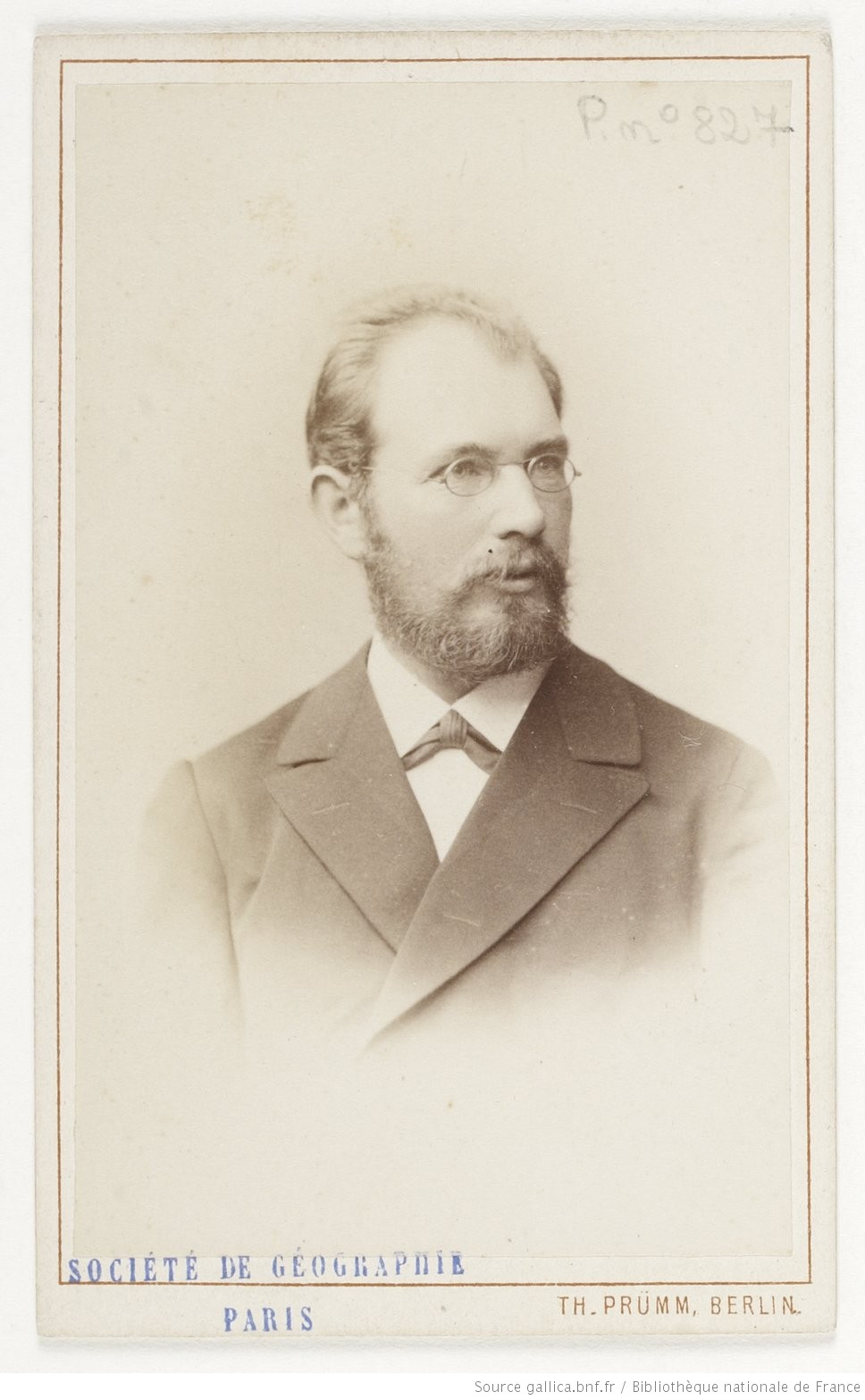
- Photograph of Krause by Berlin photographer Theodor Prümm, 1822. Stamped with Société de Géographie and archived at the archive of BnF Gallica
- Born: December 30, 1848; Polnisch Konopath, Kreis Schwetz, West Prussia, Kingdom of Prussia
- Died: March 14, 1908 (aged 59); Groß-Lichterfelde, Berlin, German Empire
- Education: Bauakademie
- Alma mater: Humboldt University of Berlin

Aurel Krause (December 30, 1848 – March 14, 1908) was a German geographer known today for his early ethnography of the Tlingit Indigenous peoples of southeast Alaska, published in 1885.

== Biography ==
Krause was born in Polnisch Konopath near Schwetz, West Prussia. He and his brother Arthur Krause were employed by the Geographical Society of Bremen in Germany when they conducted ethnological research in Siberia. Following this expedition, Aurel Krause carried out independent field research among the Tlingit of Klukwan, Alaska, between 1881 and 1882.His journey and published accounts were noted in the journals Nature and Science.

Krause died in 1908 in Groß-Lichterfelde.

== Legacy ==
Mount Krause, located 16 miles west-southwest of Haines, Alaska, is named after the Krause brothers and is the fifth highest peak in the Takhinsha Mountains with an elevation of 7027 ft (2141.83 m). Aurel Glacier, named after Aurel Krause, descends from the western side of Mount Krause before heading northward to the Takhin River.

== Bibliography ==
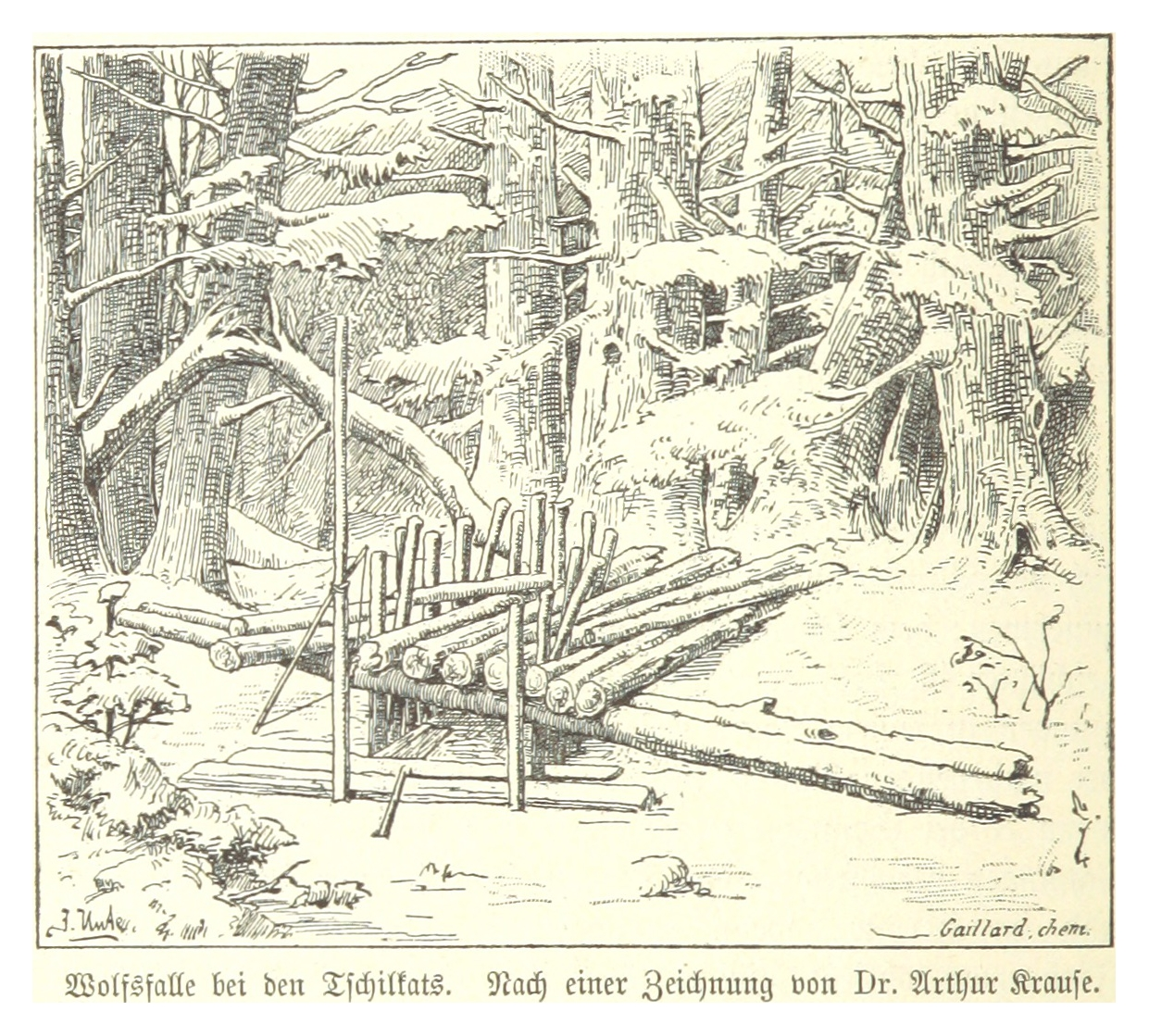
Illustration from his book

- Krause, Aurel (1956). The Tlingit Indians: Results of a Trip to the Northwest Coast of America and the Bering Straits. (Original title: Die Tlinkit-Indianer.) Trans. by Erna Gunther. Seattle: University of Washington Press.
- Krause, Aurel and Krause, Arthur (1984). To the Chukchi Peninsula and to the Tlingit Indians 1881/1882. Trans. By Dietrich Reimer Verlag.
- Krause, Aurel (1981). Journey to the Tlingits. Trans. By Margot Krause McCaffrey. Haines Centennial Commission.
