= Kosowo, Świecie County =

Village in Kociewie

Kosowo
- Village
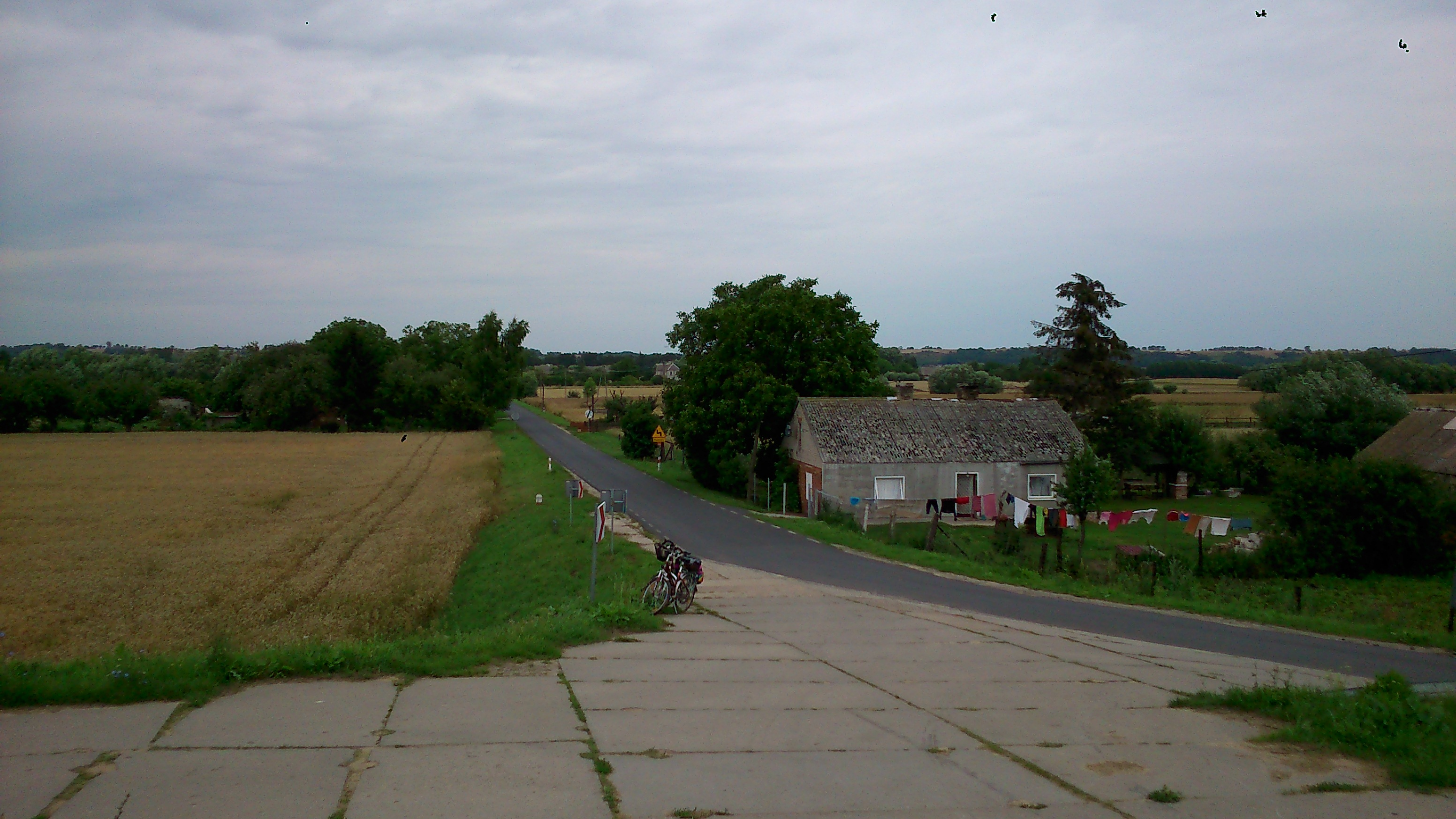

- Location within Poland
- Coordinates: 53°22′N 18°22′E
- Country: Poland
- Voivodeship: Kuyavian-Pomeranian
- County: Świecie
- Gmina: Świecie

Kosowo [kɔˈsɔvɔ] is a village in the administrative district of Gmina Świecie, within Świecie County, Kuyavian-Pomeranian Voivodeship, in north-central Poland.
