= Małe Bedlenki =

Settlement in Kociewie

- Hamlet
- Location within Poland
- Coordinates: 53°27′57″N 18°24′57″E
- Country: Poland
- Voivodeship: Kuyavian-Pomeranian
- County: Świecie
- Gmina: Świecie

Małe Bedlenki [ˈmawɛ bɛˈdlɛŋki] is a hamlet in the administrative district of Gmina Świecie, within Świecie County, Kuyavian-Pomeranian Voivodeship, in north-central Poland.
