= Sulnowo =

Village in Poland

- Wieś
- Location within Poland
- Coordinates: 53°26′04″N 18°26′46″E
- Country: Poland
- Voivodeship: Kuyavian–Pomeranian
- County: Świecie
- Gmina: Świecie

Sulnowo [sulˈnɔvɔ] is a village in the administrative district of Gmina Świecie, within Świecie County, Kuyavian–Pomeranian Voivodeship, in north-central Poland.
