= Drozdowo, Kuyavian-Pomeranian Voivodeship =

Village in Kociewie

Drozdowo
- Village
- Location within Poland
- Coordinates: 53°24′N 18°20′E
- Country: Poland
- Voivodeship: Kuyavian-Pomeranian
- County: Świecie
- Gmina: Świecie

Drozdowo [drɔzˈdɔvɔ] is a village in the administrative district of Gmina Świecie, within Świecie County, Kuyavian-Pomeranian Voivodeship, in north-central Poland.
