= Topolinek, Kuyavian-Pomeranian Voivodeship =

Village in Kociewie

Topolinek
- Village
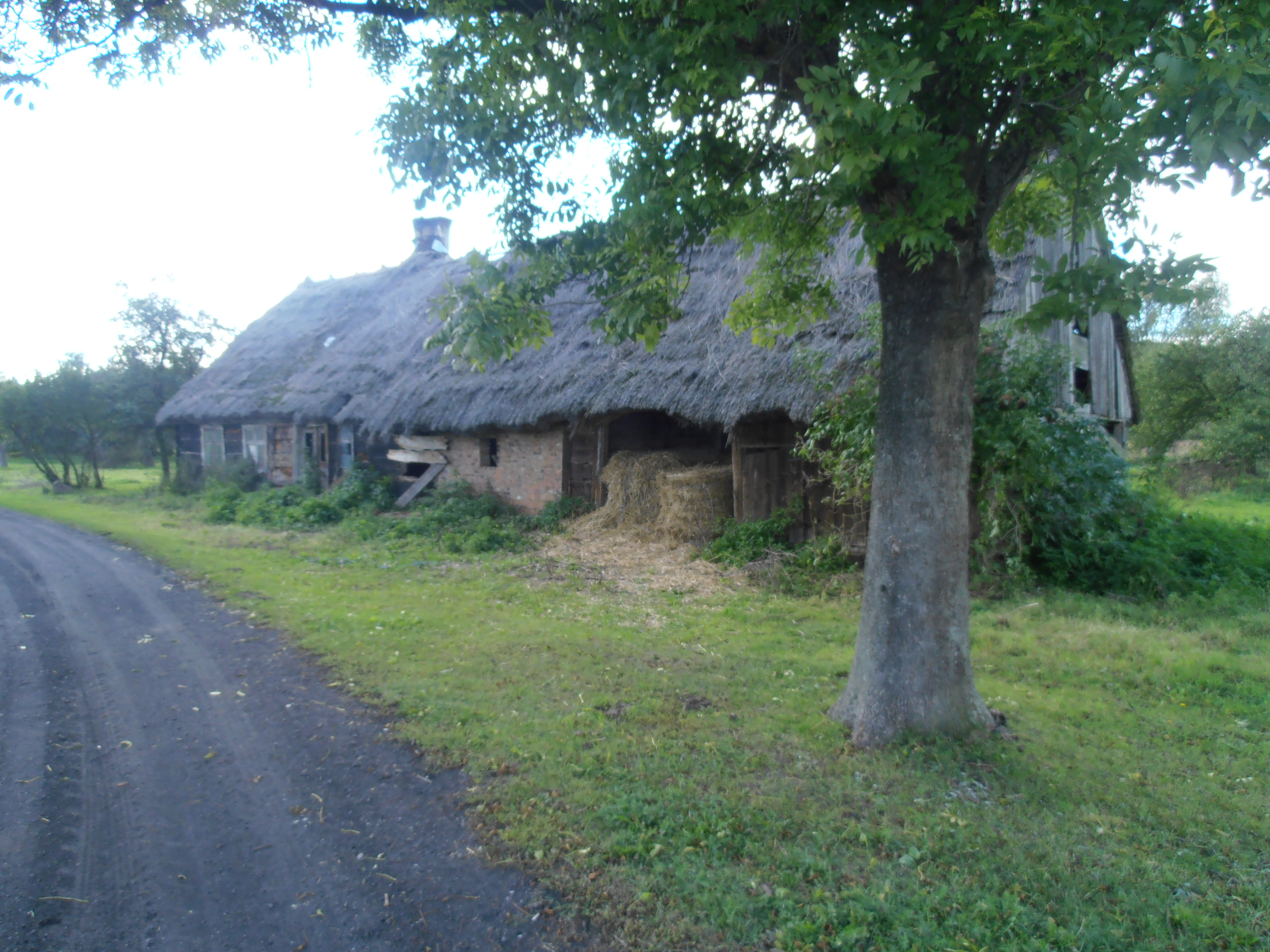

- Location within Poland
- Coordinates: 53°20′N 18°19′E
- Country: Poland
- Voivodeship: Kuyavian-Pomeranian
- County: Świecie
- Gmina: Świecie

Topolinek [tɔpɔˈlinɛk] is a village in the administrative district of Gmina Świecie, within Świecie County, Kuyavian-Pomeranian Voivodeship, in north-central Poland.
