= Ernestowo =

Village in Kociewie

- Village
- Location within Poland
- Coordinates: 53°27′38″N 18°28′49″E
- Country: Poland
- Voivodeship: Kuyavian-Pomeranian
- County: Świecie
- Gmina: Świecie

Ernestowo [ɛrnɛsˈtɔvɔ] is a village in the administrative district of Gmina Świecie, within Świecie County, Kuyavian-Pomeranian Voivodeship, in north-central Poland.
