= Wyrwa =

Settlement in Kociewie

Wyrwa Wyrwa-Młyn
- Hamlet
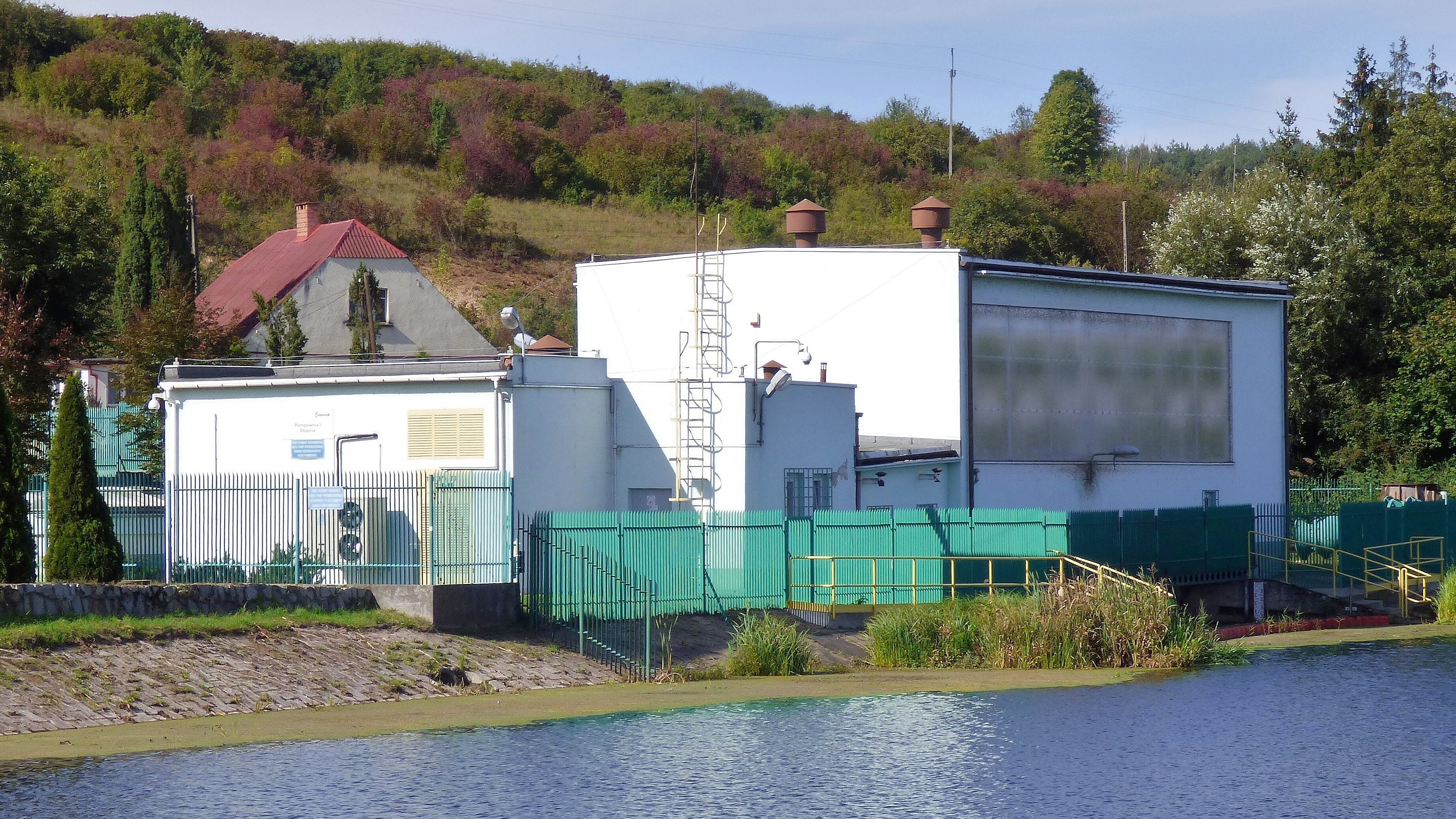
- A water pumping station in the hamlet

- Location within Poland
- Coordinates: 53°26′14″N 18°22′14″E
- Country: Poland
- Voivodeship: Kuyavian-Pomeranian
- County: Świecie
- Gmina: Świecie

Wyrwa [ˈvɨrva] is a hamlet in the administrative district of Gmina Świecie, within Świecie County, Kuyavian-Pomeranian Voivodeship, in north-central Poland.
