= Głogówko Królewskie =

Village in Kociewie

- Village
- Location within Poland
- Coordinates: 53°23′N 18°24′E
- Country: Poland
- Voivodeship: Kuyavian-Pomeranian
- County: Świecie
- Gmina: Świecie

Głogówko Królewskie [ɡwɔˈɡufkɔ kruˈlɛfskʲɛ] is a village in the administrative district of Gmina Świecie, within Świecie County, Kuyavian-Pomeranian Voivodeship, in north-central Poland.
