= Nowe Dobra, Świecie County =

Settlement in Kociewie

Nowe Dobra
- Colony
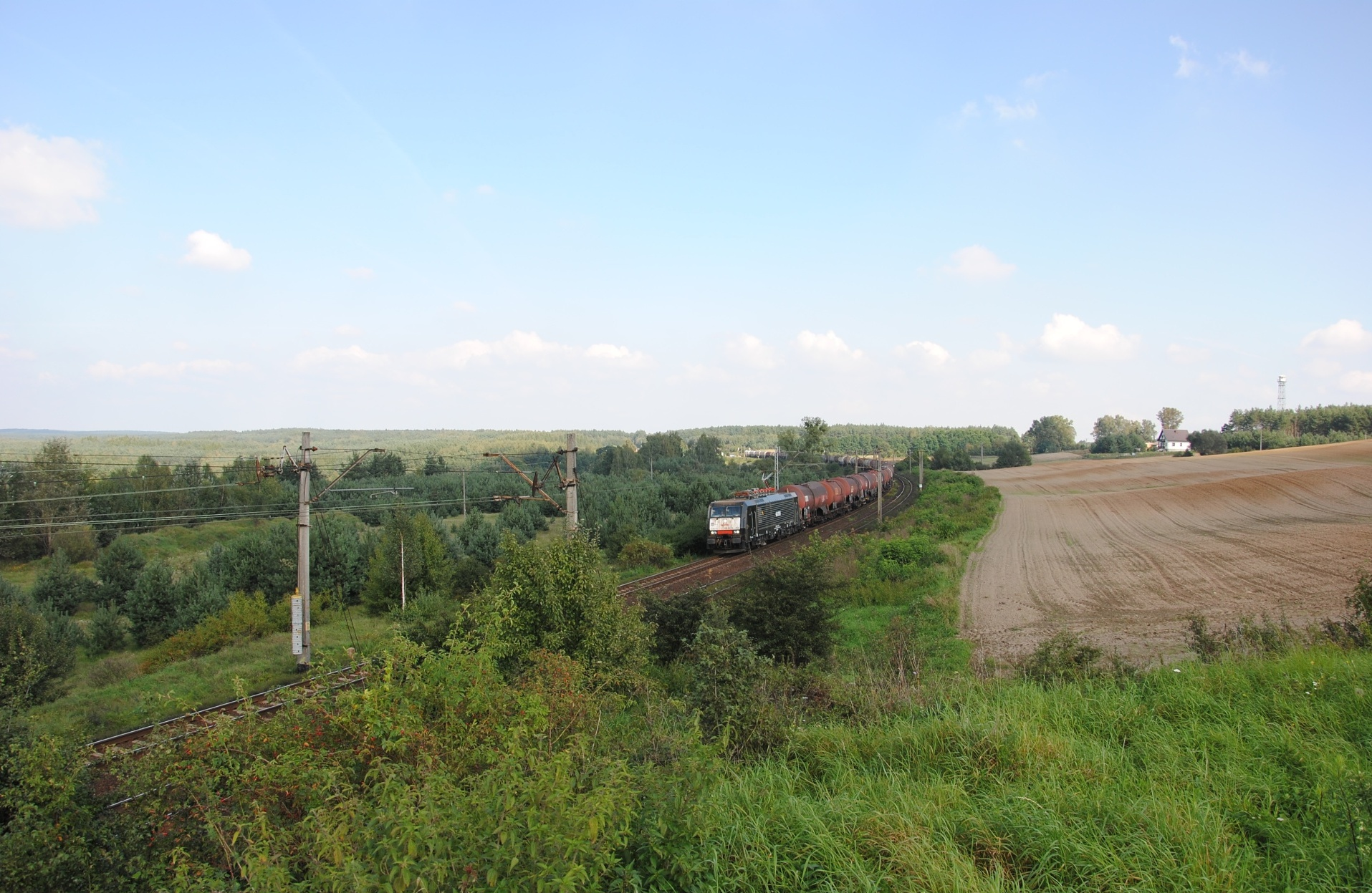
- A Lotos Kolej locomotive running by Nowe Dobra

- Location within Poland
- Coordinates: 53°26′11″N 18°22′29″E
- Country: Poland
- Voivodeship: Kuyavian-Pomeranian
- County: Świecie
- Gmina: Świecie

Nowe Dobra [ˈnɔvɛ ˈdɔbra] is a colony in the administrative district of Gmina Świecie, within Świecie County, Kuyavian-Pomeranian Voivodeship, in north-central Poland.
