= Marianki, Świecie =

Dzielnica of Świecie

Marianki
- Dzielnica
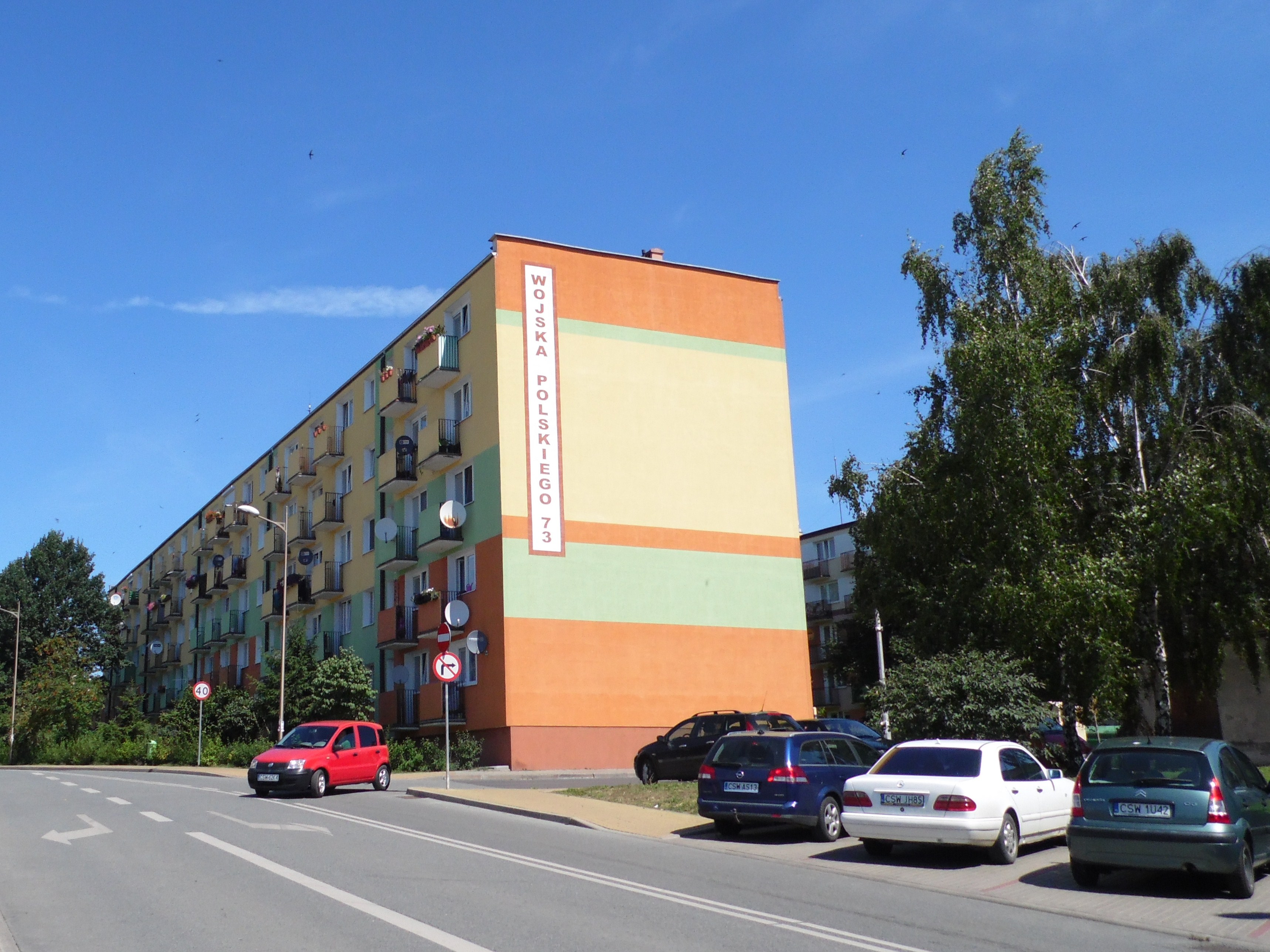
- Residential housing in southern Marianki.

- Location within Poland
- Coordinates: 53°24′33″N 18°25′29″E
- Country: Poland
- Voivodeship: Kuyavian-Pomeranian
- County: Świecie
- Gmina: Świecie
- Population: c. 13,500−14,000

Marianki [maˈrjaŋki] is a city district of Świecie in the administrative district of Gmina Świecie, within Świecie County, Kuyavian-Pomeranian Voivodeship, in north-central Poland.

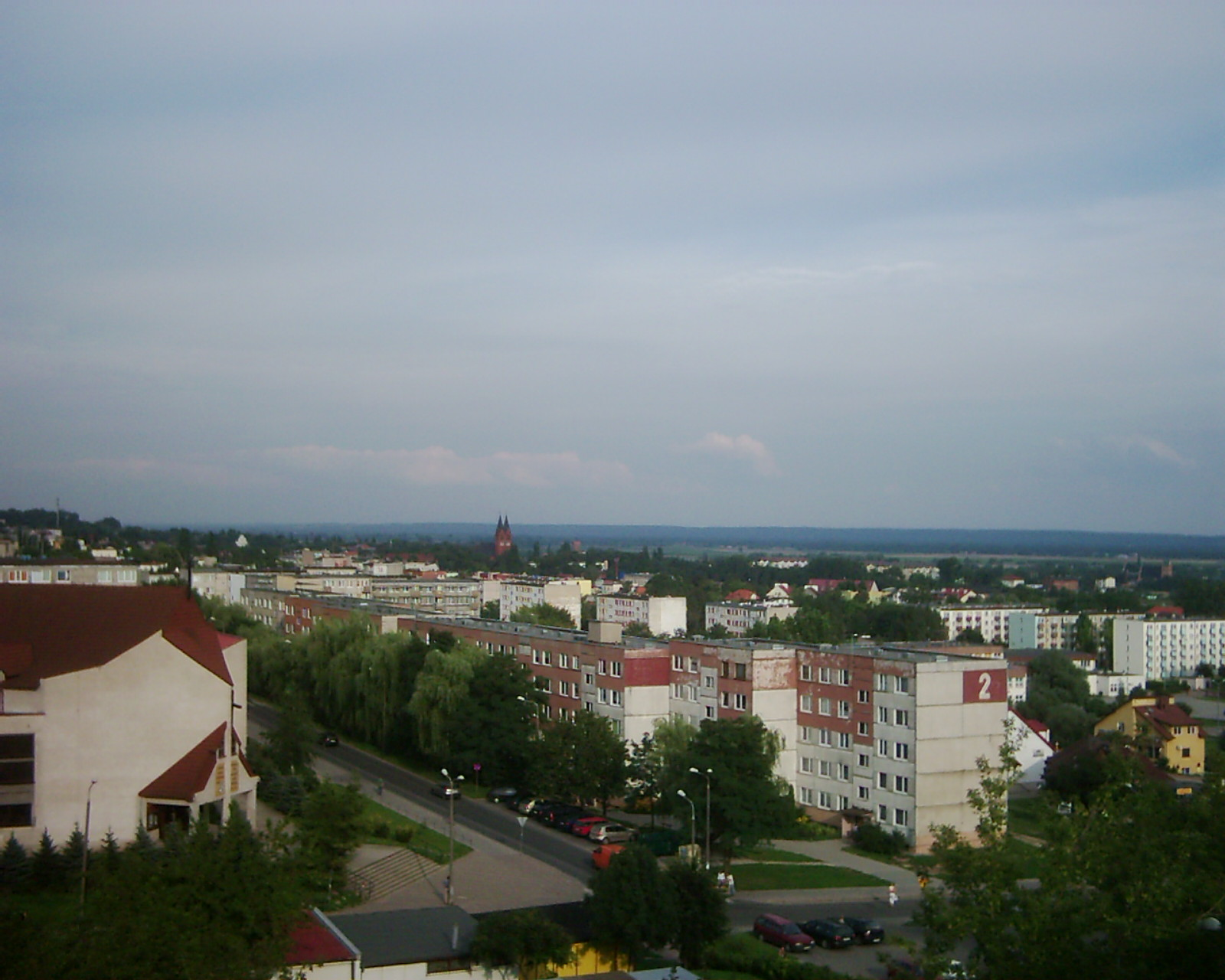
Aerial view of part of Marianki, 2007.
