= Kozłowo, Świecie County =

Kozłowo
- Village
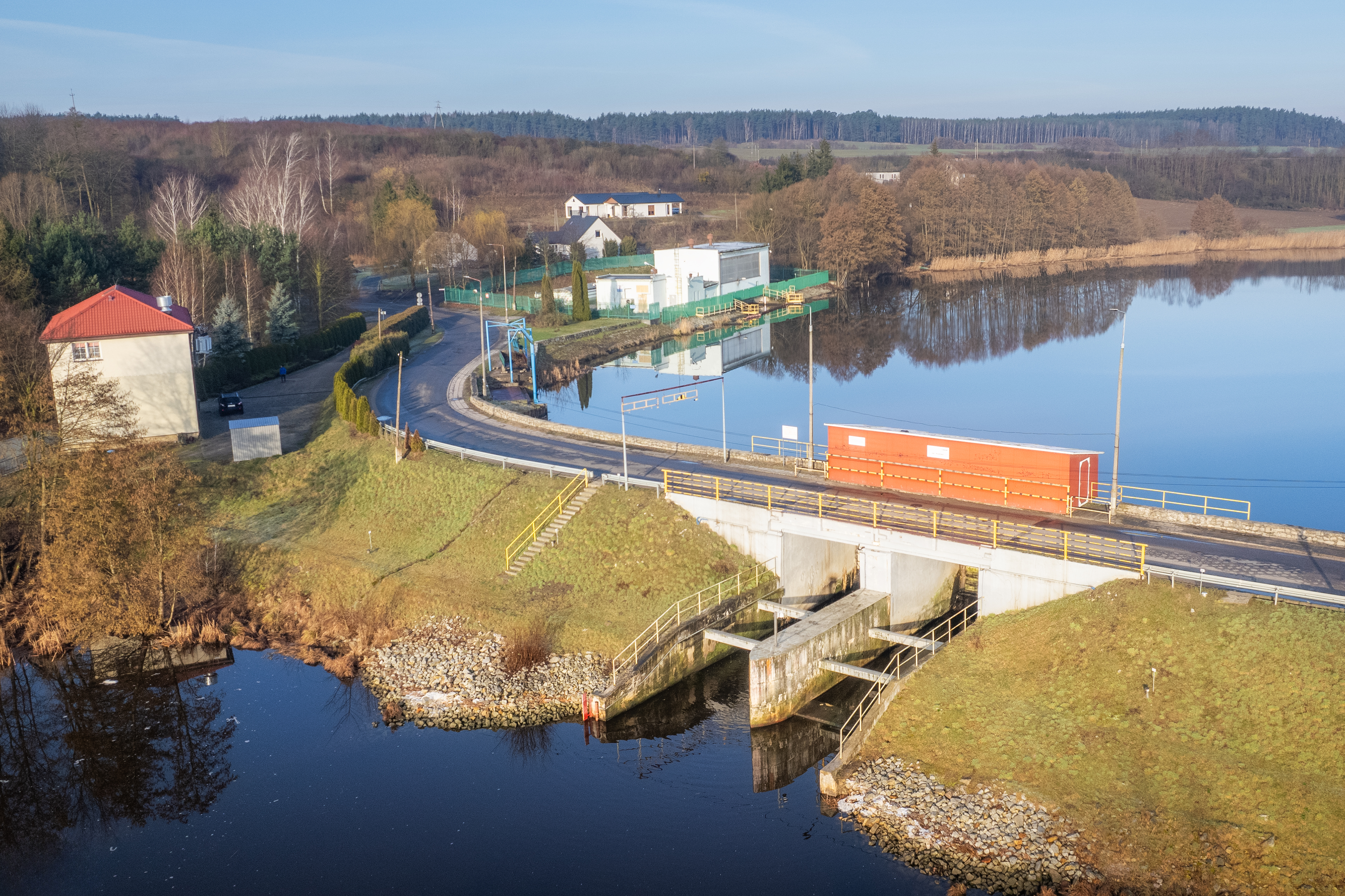
- Weir

- Location within Poland
- Coordinates: 53°25′N 18°23′E
- Country: Poland
- Voivodeship: Kuyavian-Pomeranian
- County: Świecie
- Gmina: Świecie

Kozłowo [kɔˈzwɔvɔ] is a village in the administrative district of Gmina Świecie, within Świecie County, Kuyavian-Pomeranian Voivodeship, in north-central Poland.
