= Skarszewo, Kuyavian-Pomeranian Voivodeship =

Village in Kociewie

Skarszewo
- Village
- Location within Poland
- Coordinates: 53°27′25″N 18°25′29″E
- Country: Poland
- Voivodeship: Kuyavian-Pomeranian
- County: Świecie
- Gmina: Świecie

Skarszewo [skarˈʂɛvɔ] is a village in the administrative district of Gmina Świecie, within Świecie County, Kuyavian-Pomeranian Voivodeship, in north-central Poland.
