= Święte, Świecie County =

Village in Kociewie

Święte
- Village
- Location within Poland
- Coordinates: 53°27′56″N 18°35′20″E
- Country: Poland
- Voivodeship: Kuyavian-Pomeranian
- County: Świecie
- Gmina: Świecie

Święte (Polish pronunciation: [ˈɕfjɛntɛ]) is a village in the administrative district of Gmina Świecie, within Świecie County, Kuyavian-Pomeranian Voivodeship, in north-central Poland.
