= Polski Konopat =

Village in Kociewie

- Village
- Location within Poland
- Coordinates: 53°25′01″N 18°21′03″E
- Country: Poland
- Voivodeship: Kuyavian-Pomeranian
- County: Świecie
- Gmina: Świecie

Polski Konopat [ˈpɔlski kɔˈnɔpat] is a village in the administrative district of Gmina Świecie, within Świecie County, Kuyavian-Pomeranian Voivodeship, in north-central Poland.

== Notable residents ==
Aurel Krause (1848–1908), German geographer
