= Wielki Konopat =

Village in Kociewie

- Village
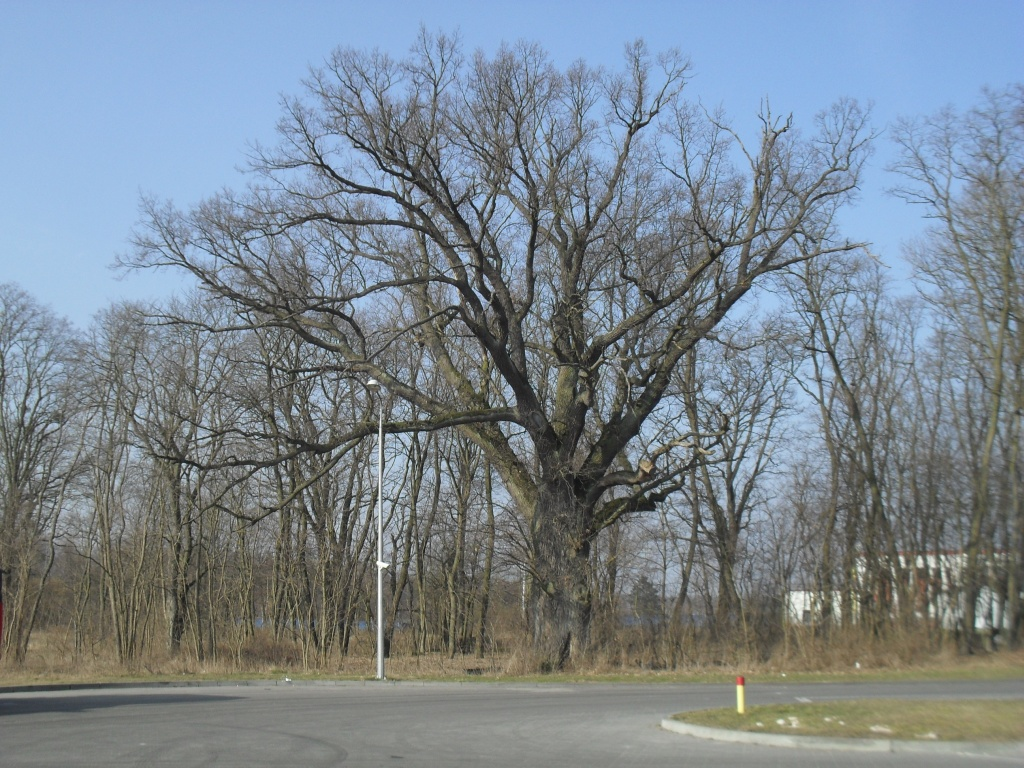
- An English oak growing in the village's evangelical cemetery

- Location within Poland
- Coordinates: 53°24′N 18°22′E
- Country: Poland
- Voivodeship: Kuyavian-Pomeranian
- County: Świecie
- Gmina: Świecie

Wielki Konopat (Polish pronunciation: [ˈvjɛlkʲi kɔˈnɔpat]) is a village in the administrative district of Gmina Świecie, within Świecie County, Kuyavian-Pomeranian Voivodeship, in north-central Poland.
