= Czaple, Świecie County =

Village in Kuyavian-Pomeranian Voivodeship, Poland

Czaple
- Village
- Location within Poland
- Coordinates: 53°27′N 18°30′E
- Country: Poland
- Voivodeship: Kuyavian-Pomeranian
- County: Świecie
- Gmina: Świecie
- Time zone: UTC+1 (CET)
  - Summer (DST): UTC+2 (CEST)
- Vehicle registration: CSW

Czaple [ˈt͡ʂaplɛ] is a village in the administrative district of Gmina Świecie, within Świecie County, Kuyavian-Pomeranian Voivodeship, in north-central Poland. It is located within the ethnocultural region of Kociewie in the historic region of Pomerania.
