= Jacek Bobrowicz =

Polish footballer (born 1962)

Personal information
- Date of birth: 14 December 1962 (age 63)
- Place of birth: Świecie, Poland
- Height: 1.86 m (6 ft 1 in)
- Position: Goalkeeper

Senior career*
| Years | Team | Apps | (Gls) |
| 1979–1980 | Stomil Grudziądz | | |
| 1980–1984 | Zawisza Bydgoszcz | | |
| 1984–1989 | Zagłębie Sosnowiec | | |
| 1990–1993 | Wisła Kraków | 110 | (0) |
| 1994 | Ślęza Wrocław | | |
| 1995 | Zagłębianka Dąbrowa Górnicza | | |
| 1995–1996 | Hutnik Kraków | 9 | (0) |
| 1996 | KKS Kalisz | | |
| 1997–1998 | RKS Radomsko | | |
| 1998 | Pelikan Łowicz | | |
| 1999 | Marko/WKS Wieluń | | |
| 2000 | Karkonosze Jelenia Góra | | |
| 2000–2002 | Siarka Tarnobrzeg | | |
| 2003 | Błękitni Sarnów | | |

International career
| 1991 | Poland | 1 | (0) |
- * Club domestic league appearances and goals

Jacek Bobrowicz (born 14 December 1962) is a Polish former professional footballer who played as a goalkeeper.

He made one appearance for the Poland national team in 1991.
