= Max Herrmann-Neisse =

German expressionist writer

Max Herrmann-Neiße
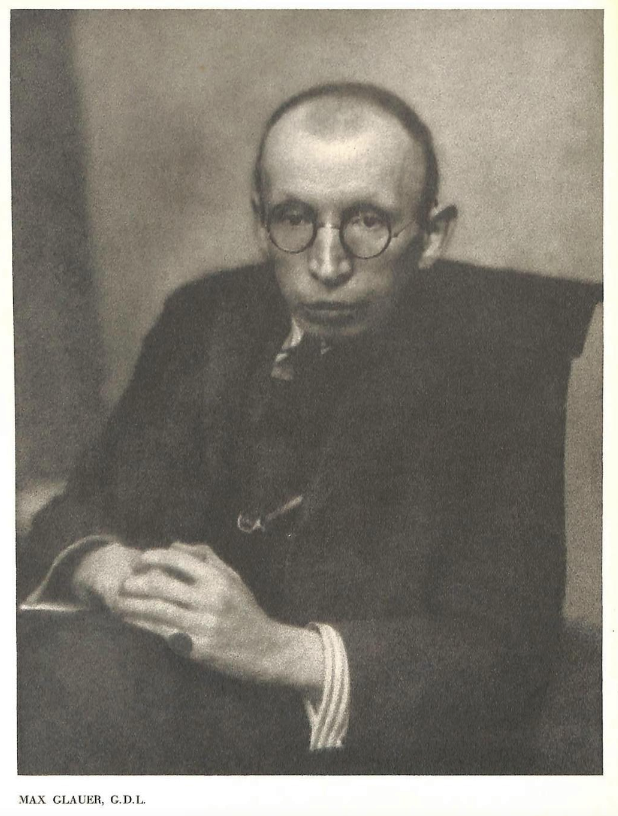
- Born: Max Herrmann; May 23, 1886; Neiße, Province of Silesia, German Empire
- Died: April 8, 1941 (aged 54); London, England, UK
- Resting place: East Finchley Cemetery
- Occupation: Writer
- Spouse: Leni Gebek
- Parent(s): Anna (née Sambale) and Robert Herrmann
- Writing career
- Language: German
- Literary movement: New Objectivity

Max Herrmann-Neiße (also Max Hermann, 23 May 1886, Neiße – 8 April 1941, London) was a German expressionist writer.

Herrmann-Neiße was a childhood friend of fellow writer Franz Jung. He was also a personal friend of the painter George Grosz, who portrayed him twice, in 1925 and 1927.

Following the November Revolution Herrmann-Neiße was sympathiser with the Communist Workers' Party of Germany.

== Biography ==
Herrmann-Neiße was born in the city of Neiße in Silesia into the family of an innkeeper. From childhood, he suffered from dwarfism. From 1905 to 1909, he studied literature at the Ludwig-Maximilians-Universität München and the University of Breslau, but did not complete the course, deciding to become a freelance writer. In 1911, his first publications appeared in Die Aktion, which went almost unnoticed by critics.

In 1914, Herrmann-Neiße published his first collection of poetry, Sie und die Stadt (transl. She and the City), for which ten years later he was awarded the Eichendorf Literary Prize. In 1916 he lost his parents. In 1917, Herrmann-Neiße married his girlfriend Leni Gebek and moved to Berlin. During this time, he actively communicated with Berlin writers belonging to socialist and anarchist circles. At the same time, he added the name of his hometown of Neiße to his surname.

In 1919 Herrmann-Neiße published three collections of poems and a play Albine und Aujust staged the same year, which were well received by critics from Else Lasker-Schüler and Oskar Loerke. He did not earn enough for a living so he also worked as a journalist and proofreader in publishing.

In the 1920s, Herrmann-Neiße began to write short stories and other prose. In 1920, he published an autobiographical novel, Cajetan Schaltermann. While most of his texts were influenced by Expressionism, in 1925 his collection of short stories Die Begegnung shows his interest in the New Objectivity. He began to present his texts in cabarets and met Claire Waldoff and Alfred Polgar. He acquired fame in Berlin. Many artists, such as Otto Dix and George Grosz portrayed him.

By the end of the 1920s, Herrmann-Neiße became one of the most famous literary men in Berlin; in 1927 he was awarded the prestigious Gerhart Hauptmann Prize.

In 1933, shortly after the Nazis came to power and the burning of the Reichstag, the poet decided to emigrate. Herrmann-Neiße left for Switzerland, and then, through several European countries, moved to London. All this time, one of the wealthy connoisseurs of his work had been providing material assistance to Herrmann-Neiße. In 1936, he founded the PEN Center for German Writers in Exile in London, but found no support and remained practically isolated. He was deprived of German citizenship by the Nazis, and his works were not translated into English, despite repeated requests. The poems of this period of his work became classics of German émigré poetry.

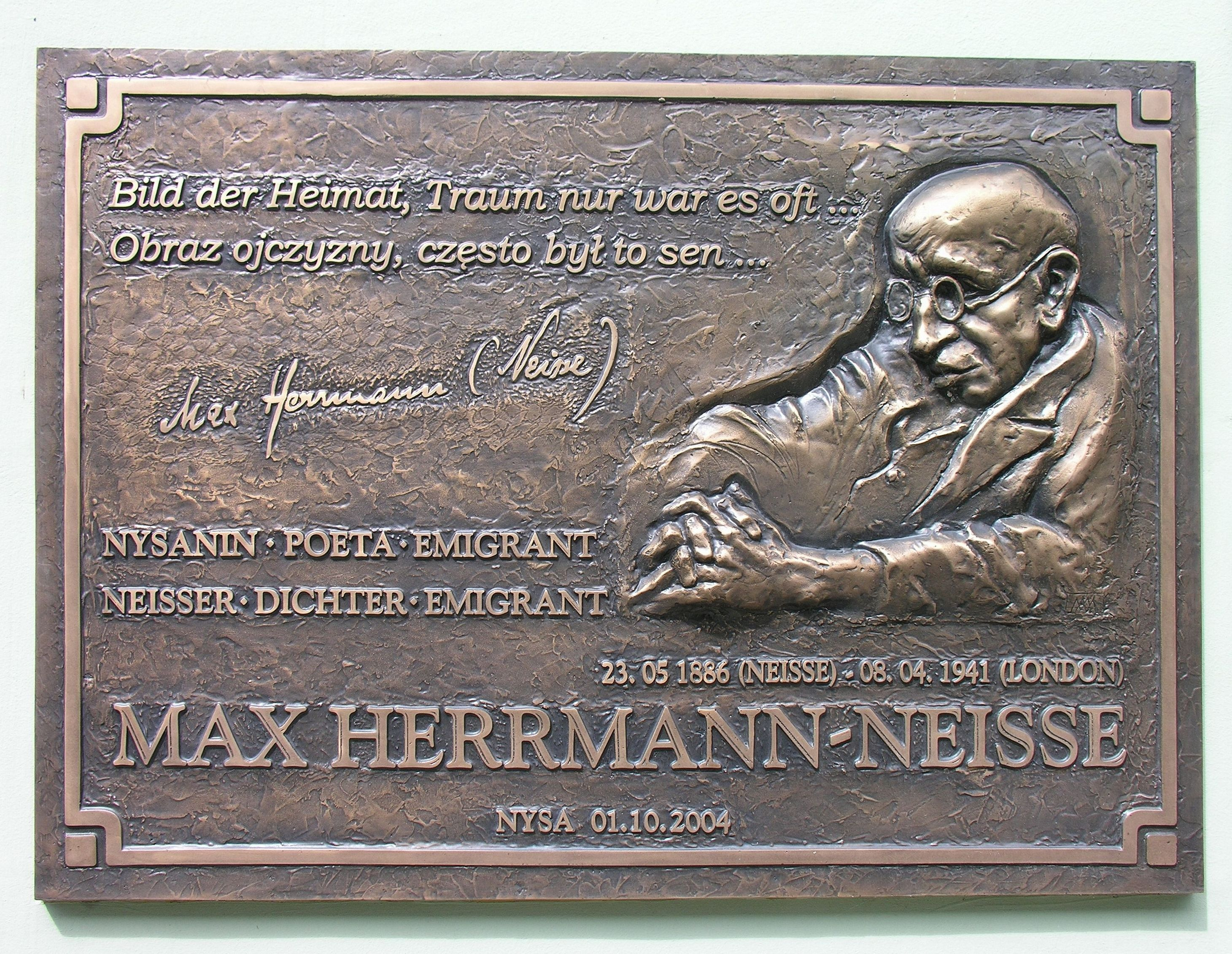
Commemorative plaque, Nysa, Poland

In April 1941, Herrmann-Neiße died of a heart attack in London and was buried in East Finchley Cemetery, then in Finchley, Middlesex. His last poems were posthumously published by his wife Gebek, who in 1960 committed suicide. Like many writers of the time, Herrmann-Neiße was quickly forgotten. It was not until the late 1970s that his works were gradually rediscovered and reissued.

German extreme metal band Heaven Shall Burn dedicated "Of Forsaken Poets" on Invictus (Iconoclast III) (2010) to Herrmann-Neiße. The song is written from his perspective and includes lines from Ein deutscher Dichter bin ich einst gewesen, making it one of the few Heaven Shall Burn songs with German lyrics.

== Works ==
- Ein kleines Leben. Gedichte und Skizzen. 1906
- Das Buch Franziskus. 1911
- Porträte des Provinztheaters. Sonette. 1913
- Sie und die Stadt. 1914
- Empörung, Andacht, Ewigkeit. Gedichte. 1918
- Verbannung. Ein Buch Gedichte. 1919
- Die Preisgabe. Gedichte. 1919
- Joseph der Sieger. Drei Bilder. 1919 (later retitled Albine und Aujust)
- Die Laube der Seligen. Eine komische Tragödie. 1919
- Cajetan Schaltermann. 1920
- Hilflose Augen. Prosadichtungen. 1920
- Der Flüchtling. 1920
- Der letzte Mensch. Eine Komödie vor Weltuntergang. 1922
- Die bürgerliche Literaturgeschichte und das Proletariat (Bourgeois Literary History and the Proletariat) Berlin-Wilmersdorf: Verlag Die Aktion. 1922
- Im Stern des Schmerzes. Ein Gedichtbuch. 1924
- Die Begegnung. Vier Erzählungen. 1925
- Der Todeskandidat. Erzählung. 1927
- Einsame Stimme. Ein Buch Gedichte. 1927
- Abschied. Gedichte. 1928
- Musik der Nacht. Gedichte. 1932
- Ein deutscher Dichter bin ich einst gewesen. Gedichte. 1934
- Um uns die Fremde. Gedichte. 1936
- Letzte Gedichte, herausgegeben von Leni Herrmann. 1941
