= Vytautas Babravičius =

Lithuanian musical artist (born 1952)

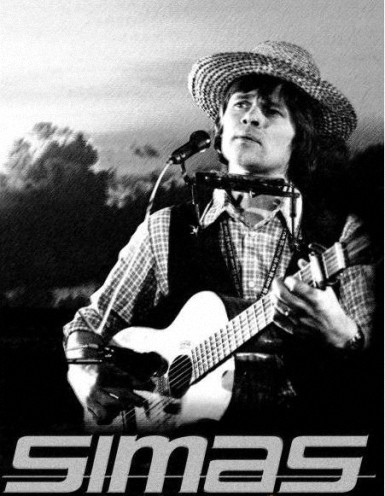

Background information
- Also known as: Simas
- Born: 10 March 1952 (age 74); Gailiakiemis, Lithuanian SSR, Soviet Union
- Genres: Country; Folk rock
- Occupations: Singer; Journalist
- Instrument: Singing
- Years active: 1967–present

Vytautas Babravičius (born 10 March 1952, known by the stage name Simas) is a Lithuanian country and folk rock musician. He is often described as a founder of Lithuanian country music scene.

== Musical career ==
Babravičius began his musical career while studying engineering at a university and playing at student's parties since 1967. In 1979 he founded a country music band Deficitai, that quickly became popular for being different than officially allowed music of the time. Group was dissolved in 1983. Later Babravičius pursued solo career under stage name Simas while working as journalist. In 1987 he founded band Runos and released a LP Vyturėliai jūs mano.

Simas' solo songs were popular during the Singing Revolution.

1996 Simas' issued first country music CD in Lithuania called Ąžuolams, liepoms. Many times he did participate in Visagino Country music festival.

In 2007 he celebrated his 40th season on the scene.

== Awards ==
- Order of the Lithuanian Grand Duke Gediminas
