= Świecie Castle =

Teutonic Castle in Świecie
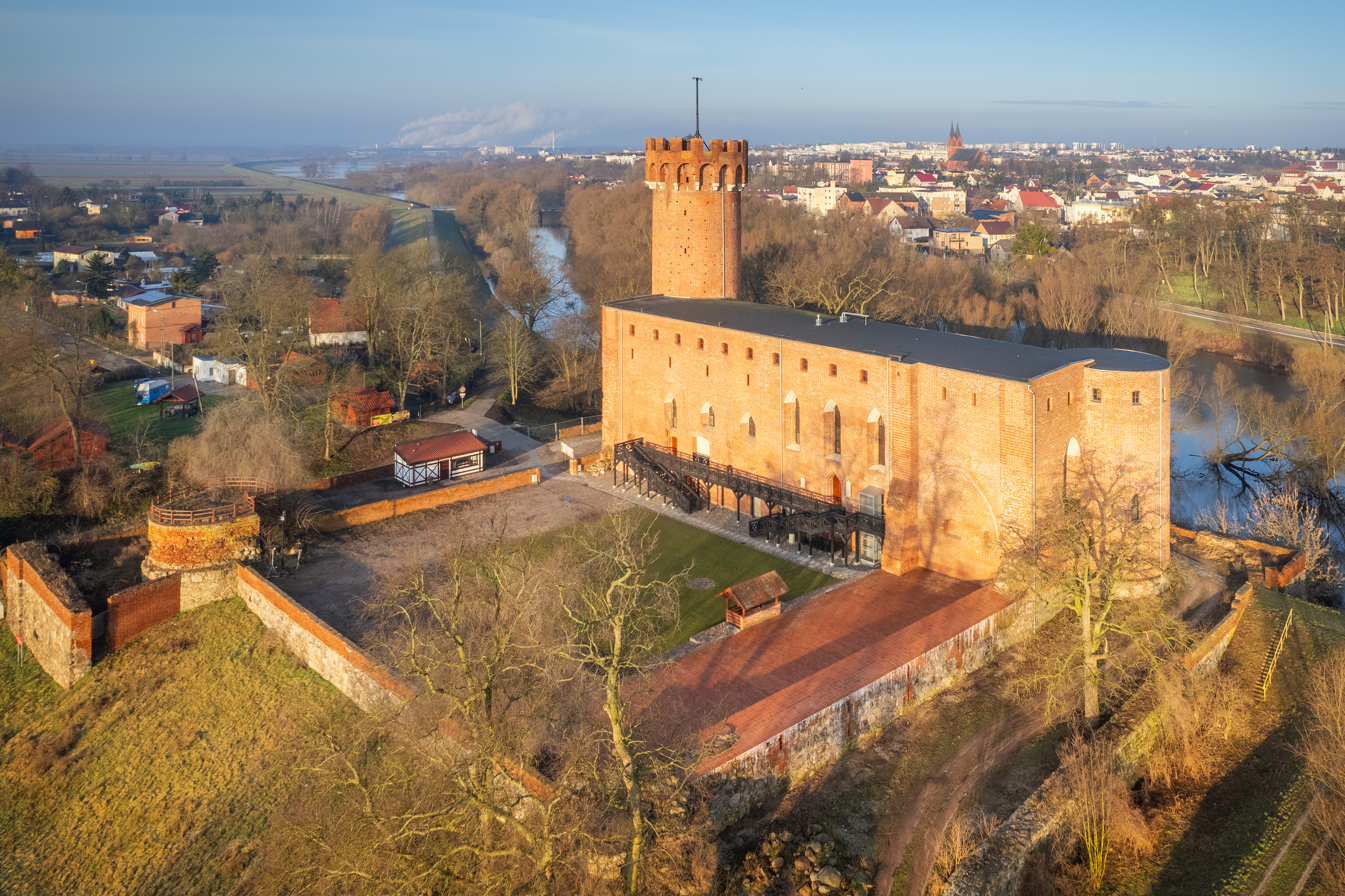
- Teutonic Castle in Świecie

- Location of the Teutonic Castle in Świeicie in Poland Świecie Castle (Kuyavian-Pomeranian Voivodeship)
- 53°24′17″N 18°27′30″E
- Location: Świecie, Kuyavian-Pomeranian Voivodeship, in Poland

History
- Built: 1335-1350
- Demolished: 1664

Site notes
- Architectural style: Gothic

Teutonic Castle in Świecie (Polish: Zamek krzyżacki w Świeciu) is a partial ruin located in Świecie. The partial ruin is kept in full-shape from the bank of the river Vistula and Wda - together with a circular tower topped with merlons. The castle is part of a complex built by the Teutonic Knights in the Gothic architectural style. The castle was built on the site of a Pomeranian dukes' gord - located by the site of the castle. Formerly the castle had four corner towers, one of which survived. The castle is surrounded by a defensive wall and a moat. In 1410 the castle was looted by Polish forces obliterated the castle. The castle was owned by the Kingdom of Poland after the Second Peace of Thorn in 1466. In the sixteenth century, Castellan Konopacki reconstructed the castle into the Renaissance architectural style. The castle was devastated after the Deluge and since then was not rebuilt. The castle was furthermore devastated after Prussian forces used the castle as training grounds. Currently the castle houses a museum, with the tower and castle renovated.

== Virtual tour ==
Starting from march 2026 there is a virtual tour of the castle available.
