= Niedźwiedź, Świecie County =

Village in Kociewie

Niedźwiedź
- Village
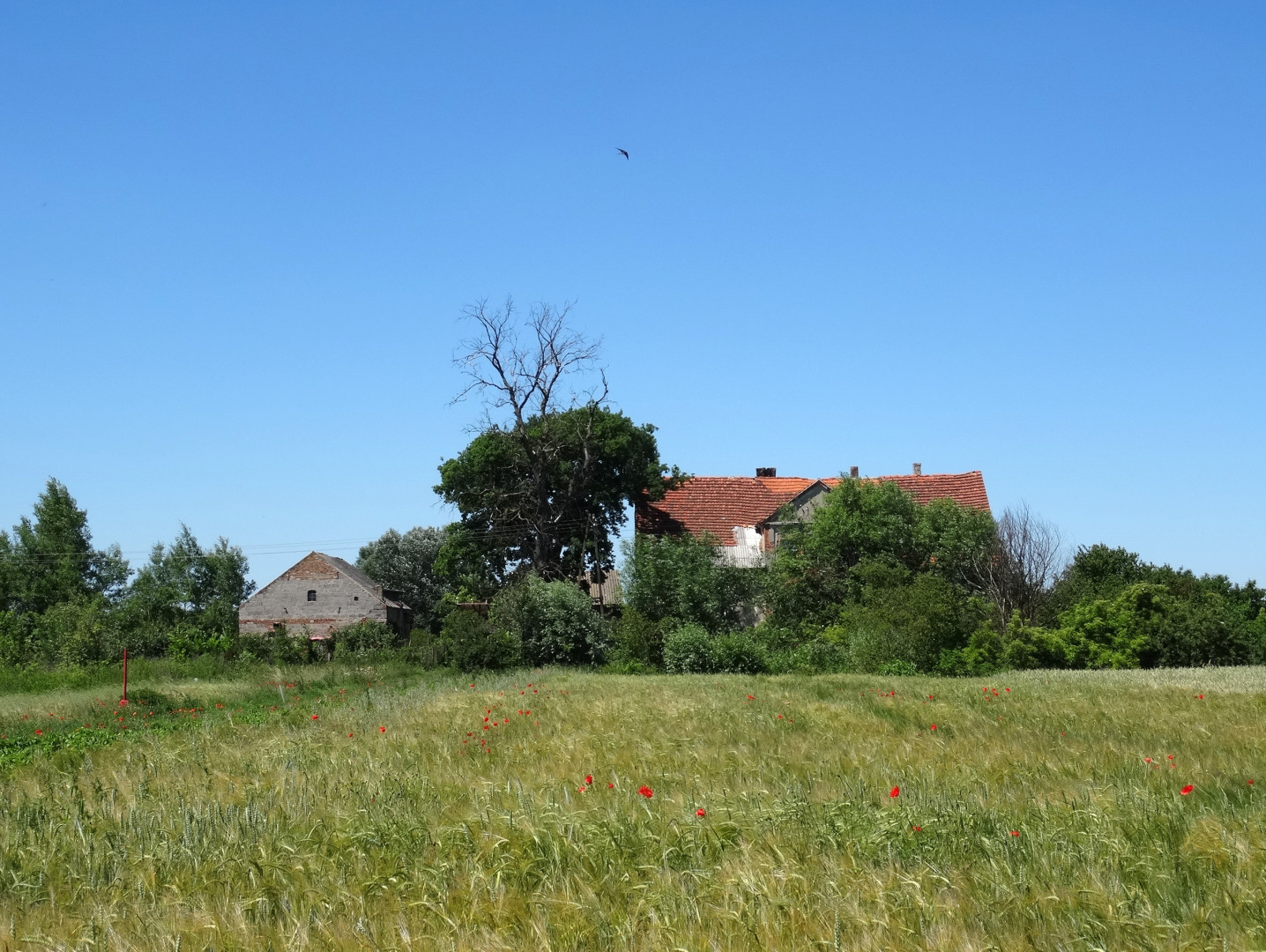

- Location within Poland
- Coordinates: 53°22′N 18°23′E
- Country: Poland
- Voivodeship: Kuyavian-Pomeranian
- County: Świecie
- Gmina: Świecie

Niedźwiedź [ˈɲɛd͡ʑvjɛt͡ɕ] is a village in the administrative district of Gmina Świecie, within Świecie County, Kuyavian-Pomeranian Voivodeship, in north-central Poland.
