= Dziki, Kuyavian-Pomeranian Voivodeship =

Village in Kociewie

Dziki
- Village
- Location within Poland
- Coordinates: 53°26′41″N 18°27′25″E
- Country: Poland
- Voivodeship: Kuyavian-Pomeranian
- County: Świecie
- Gmina: Świecie

Dziki [ˈd͡ʑiki] is a village in the administrative district of Gmina Świecie, within Świecie County, Kuyavian-Pomeranian Voivodeship, in north-central Poland.
