= Wiąg =

Village in Kociewie

- Village
- Location within Poland
- Coordinates: 53°25′54″N 18°31′12″E
- Country: Poland
- Voivodeship: Kuyavian-Pomeranian
- County: Świecie
- Gmina: Świecie
- Population: 520

Wiąg [vjɔŋk] is a village in the administrative district of Gmina Świecie, within Świecie County, Kuyavian-Pomeranian Voivodeship, in north-central Poland.

== People ==
- Oskar Loerke (1884-1941), German poet
