= Gmina Świecie =

Gmina Świecie Świecie Commune
- Gmina
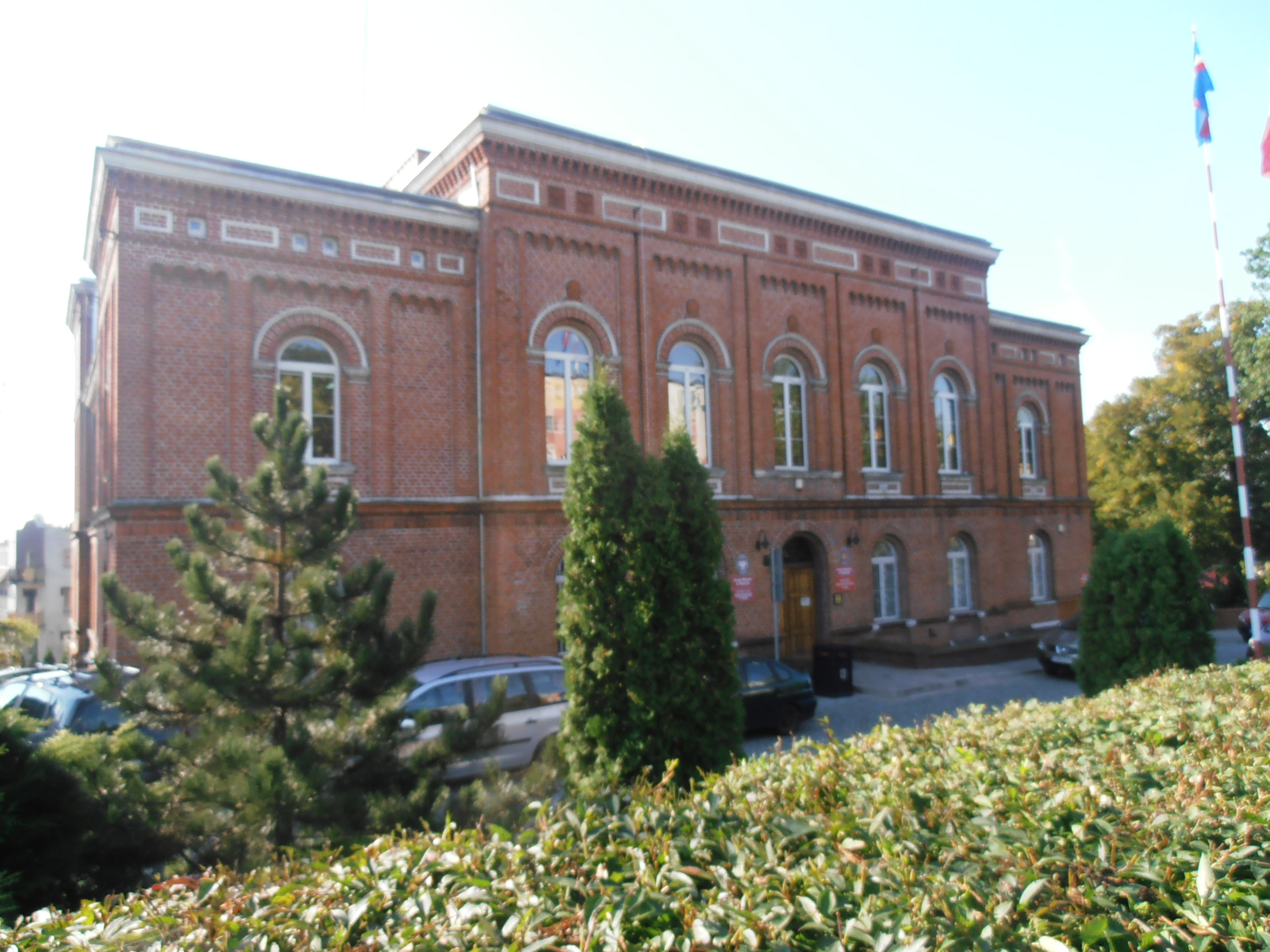
- Gmina office in Świecie

- Flag Coat of arms
- Interactive map of Gmina Świecie
- Coordinates (Świecie): 53°25′N 18°26′E
- Country: Poland
- Voivodeship: Kuyavian-Pomeranian
- County: Świecie
- Seat: Świecie

Area
  - Total: 174.81 km^{2} (67.49 sq mi)

Population (2023)
  - Total: 32,807
  - Density: 187.67/km^{2} (486.07/sq mi)
  - Urban: 24,841
  - Rural: 7,966
- Time zone: UTC+1 (CET)
  - Summer (DST): UTC+2 (CEST)
- Vehicle registration: CSW
- Website: http://www.csw24.pl

Gmina Świecie is an urban-rural gmina (administrative district) in Świecie County, Kuyavian-Pomeranian Voivodeship, in north-central Poland. Its seat is the town of Świecie, which lies approximately 45 kilometres (28 mi) north of Toruń and 45 km (28 mi) north-east of Bydgoszcz.

The gmina covers an area of 174.81 square kilometres (67.5 sq mi), and as of 2023 its total population is 32,807 (out of which the population of Świecie amounts to 24,841, and the population of the rural part of the gmina is 7,966).

== Villages ==
Apart from the town of Świecie, Gmina Świecie contains the villages and settlements of Chrystkowo, Czapelki, Czaple, Drozdowo, Dworzysko, Dziki, Ernestowo, Głogówko Królewskie, Gruczno, Kosowo, Kozłowo, Małe Bedlenki, Marianki, Morsk, Niedźwiedź, Nowe Dobra, Polski Konopat, Przechówko, Sartowice, Skarszewo, Sulnówko, Sulnowo, Święte, Topolinek, Wiąg, Wielki Konopat and Wyrwa.

== Neighbouring gminas ==
Gmina Świecie is bordered by the town of Chełmno and by the gminas of Bukowiec, Chełmno, Dragacz, Drzycim, Jeżewo and Pruszcz.
