= Świecie =

Town in Poland

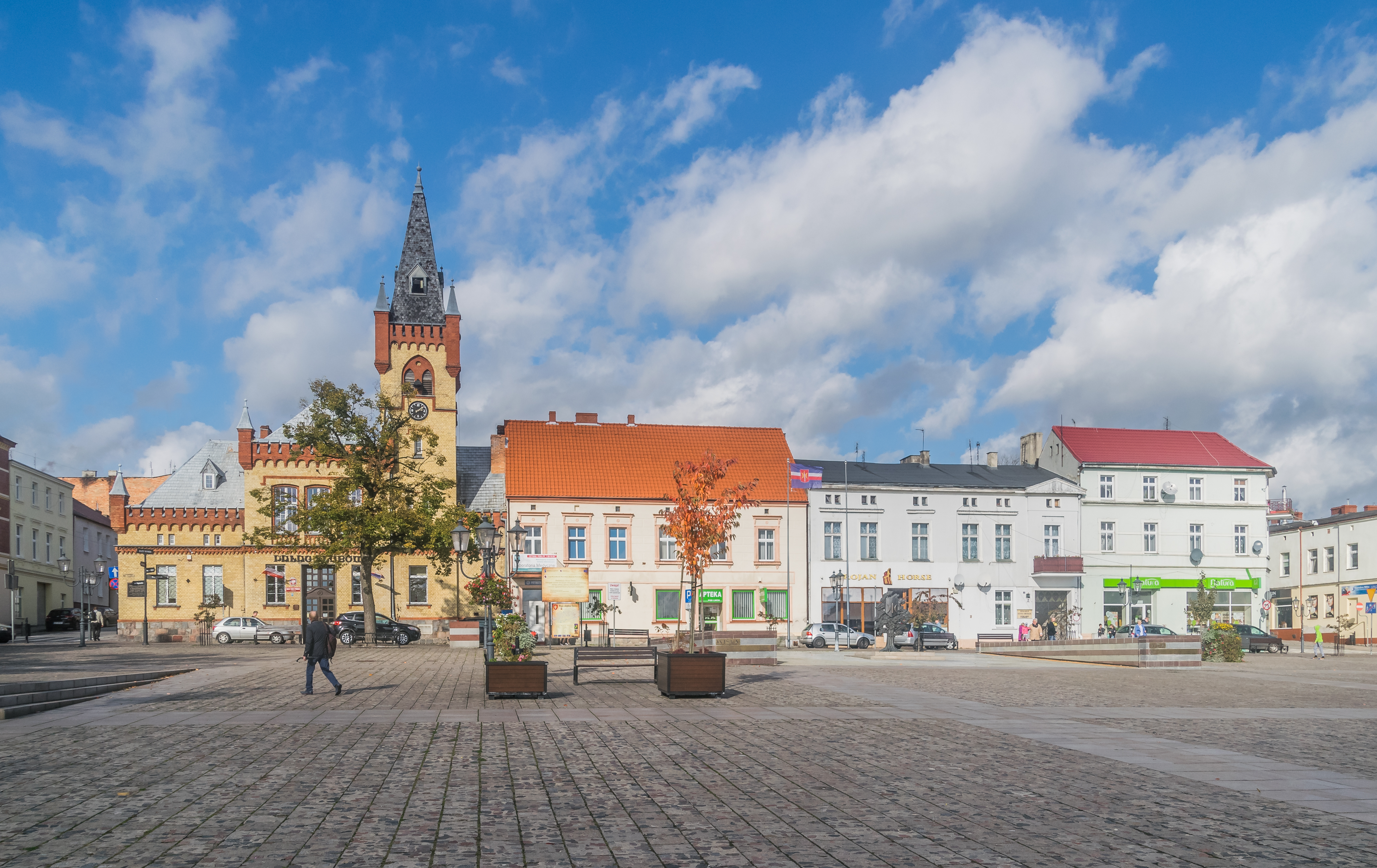
- Market square (Rynek) with the Old Town Hall

- Flag Coat of arms
- Motto: Świecie - najlepsze na świecie Świecie - the best in the world
- Location within Poland
- Coordinates: 53°25′N 18°26′E
- Country: Poland
- Voivodeship: Kuyavian-Pomeranian
- County: Świecie
- Gmina: Świecie
- First mentioned: 1198
- Town rights: 1338

Government
  - Mayor: Krzysztof Kułakowski

Area
  - Total: 11.87 km^{2} (4.58 sq mi)
- Highest elevation: 86 m (282 ft)
- Lowest elevation: 19 m (62 ft)

Population (2023)
  - Total: 24,841
  - Density: 2,093/km^{2} (5,420/sq mi)
- Time zone: UTC+1 (CET)
  - Summer (DST): UTC+2 (CEST)
- Postal code: 86-100 to 86-105
- Area code: +48 52
- Car plates: CSW
- Website: www.um-swiecie.pl

Świecie (Polish: [ˈɕfjɛt͡ɕɛ]; Kashubian: Swiecé; German: Schwetz an der Weichsel) is a town in northern Poland with 24,841 inhabitants (2023), capital of Świecie County in the Kuyavian-Pomeranian Voivodeship. It is located within the ethnocultural region of Kociewie in the historic region of Pomerania.

Founded in the Middle Ages, Świecie is a former royal town of Poland, which prospered as a trade center due to its location at the intersection of important trade routes. The town features heritage sites in a variety of styles, including Gothic, Renaissance, Baroque, Neo-Renaissance and Neo-Gothic, a preserved market square, and the region's sole Museum of Firefighting. Świecie is home to one of the oldest psychiatric hospitals in Poland.

== Location ==
Świecie is located on the west bank of river Vistula at the mouth of river Wda.

== Etymology ==
The name of the town comes from the Polish word świecić, which means "to shine".

== History ==
=== Early history ===
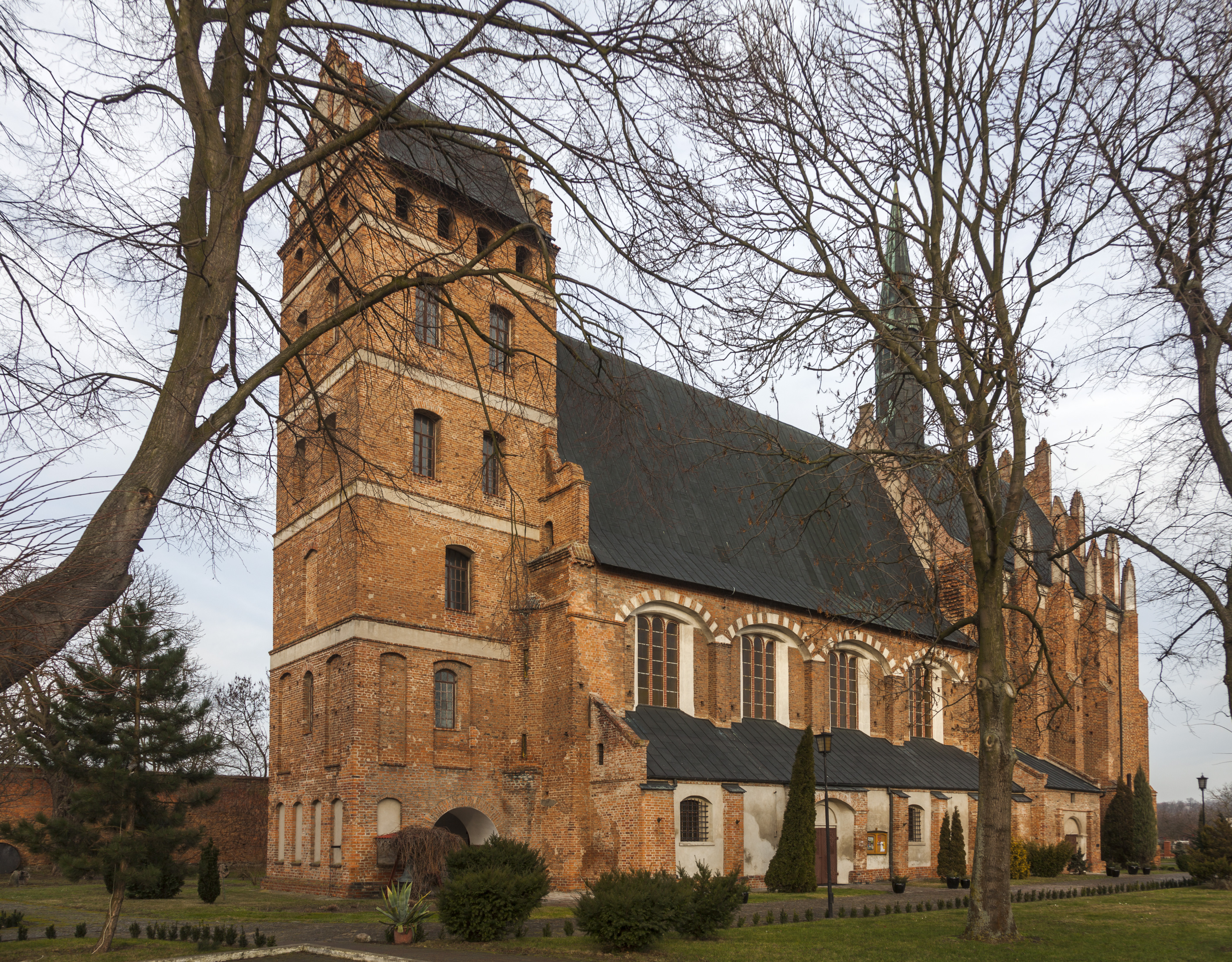
Gothic-Renaissance Saint Stanislaus and Our Lady of Częstochowa church

A fishermen's village existed at the site of the present-day town in the Early Middle Ages. The area became part of the emerging Polish state in the 10th century. During the period of the fragmentation of Poland, Świecie became the residence of Pomeranian Duke Grzymisław. Grzymisław's duchy included part of Gdańsk Pomerania with prominent towns of Starogard Gdański and Lubiszewo, as well as Skarszewy.

The Teutonic Order conquered Gdańsk in 1309 and in 1310 bought the region in Soldin from the Margraves of Brandenburg, who claimed the region, which however legally formed part of Poland. By then, the settlement already had the status of Civitas, just as Gdańsk and Tczew did. Świecie was granted a municipal form of government by the Teutonic Order, when it was still located on the high west bank of the Vistula. Probably because of destruction by fire, during the period 1338–1375 the town was relocated down into the valley at the Vistula. The town was briefly recaptured by the Poles after their victory in the Battle of Grunwald in 1410.

In 1454, in the beginning stages of the Thirteen Years' War, it was captured by the Prussian Confederation, which opposed Teutonic rule, and upon the request of which King Casimir IV Jagiellon re-incorporated the territory to the Kingdom of Poland that same year. The Teutonic Knights renounced any claims to the town, and recognized it as part of Poland in 1466. It was a county seat and royal town of Poland, administratively located in the Pomeranian Voivodeship in the province of Royal Prussia in the Greater Poland Province. The town prospered due to its location at the intersection of the Amber Road and the trade route connecting Western Pomerania with Warmia, Masuria and Lithuania. In the 17th century, Świecie suffered as a result of the Swedish invasion of Poland and an epidemic.

=== Late modern period ===
In 1772, during the First Partition of Poland, the town was annexed by the Kingdom of Prussia, and as Schwetz was integrated into the newly formed Province of West Prussia. In 1871, it also became part of Germany. The economic development was decisively improved by the connection to the railway network in 1888. In 1905, the town had a Protestant church, two Catholic churches and a synagogue. In 1910, Schwetz had a population of 8,042, of which 4,206 (52.3%) were German-speaking, 3,605 (44.8%) were Polish-speaking and 166 (2.1%) were bilingual in German and another language.

After World War I and the restoration of independent Poland, Świecie was restored by Germany to Poland in 1920 according to the Treaty of Versailles and became part of the Pomeranian Voivodeship of the Second Polish Republic. In 1920, Stanisław Kostka, a distinguished Polish activist who was active in Grudziądz and Świecie under Prussian rule, became the mayor of the town. Kostka built new flood embankments that protect Świecie from floods to this day, and under his administration the town developed economically and culturally.

=== World War II and post-war period ===
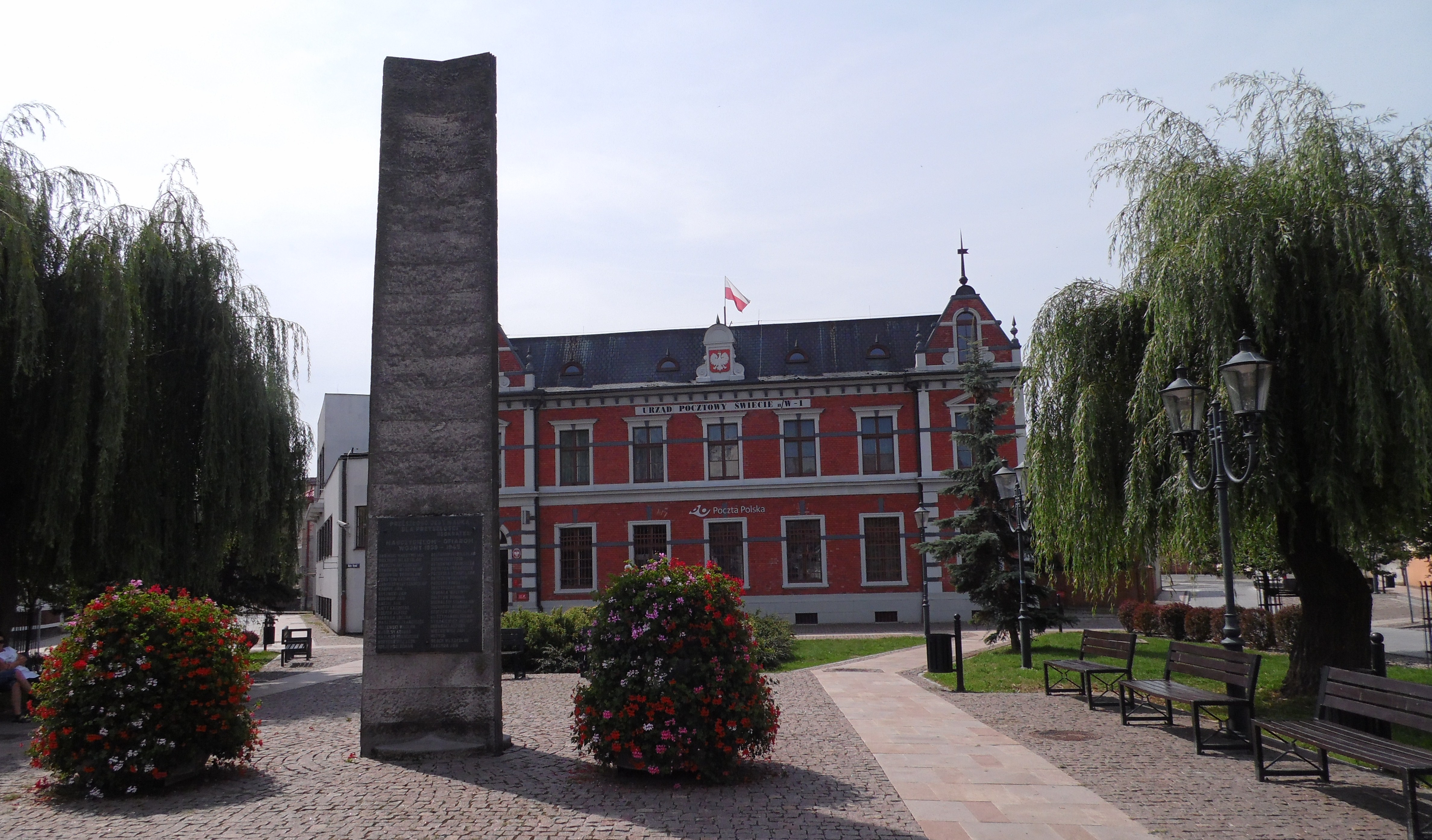
Memorial to Polish teachers murdered during the German occupation between 1939 and 1945, with the post office in the background

During the Second World War, Nazi Germany occupied Świecie and annexed it on 8 October 1939, making it the seat of the Kreis county of Schwetz. It was administered as part of the Reichsgau Danzig-West Prussia. Prominent Poles were arrested using secret politically targeted hit list and murdered using the Volksdeutscher Selbstschutz paramilitaries. Local Poles were murdered in large massacres in Świecie, Grupa and Mniszek.

People shot were finished off by blows delivered by shovels and the butts of assault rifles; they were buried in mass graves when still alive. Mothers were forced to place their children in the pits where they were shot together. Before executions women and girls were raped.(...) [The atrocities] evoked horror even in the Germans, including some soldiers. Terrified at what they saw in the town of Świecie two of them felt compelled to submit a report [to military authorities].

The Germans also murdered the staff and 1,350 patients of the local psychiatric hospital in large massacres in the Szpęgawski and Luszkówko forests. Local Poles were also subjected to expulsions.

The Polish resistance was active, including the Pomeranian Griffin and Grunwald organizations.

The town was captured by combined Polish and Soviet forces on February 10, 1945, and restored to Poland, where it became part of the Bydgoszcz Voivodeship formed in 1946 in the People's Republic of Poland. An internment camp was operation for Germans of the region, who could be selected for forced labor each morning by the Polish; many Germans died. The camp was dissolved in March, some Germans were sent to Germany, some were sent to the Central Labour Camp in Potulice.

The town grew rapidly with population reaching 13,500 by 1961. Sugar refinery was expanded, meat, cattle feed plants, and mills were built, including the paper factory launched in 1968, with 4,600 employees. In 1988 Świecie was awarded with the Officer's Cross of the Order of Polonia Restituta, one of Poland's highest state orders.

== Demographics ==
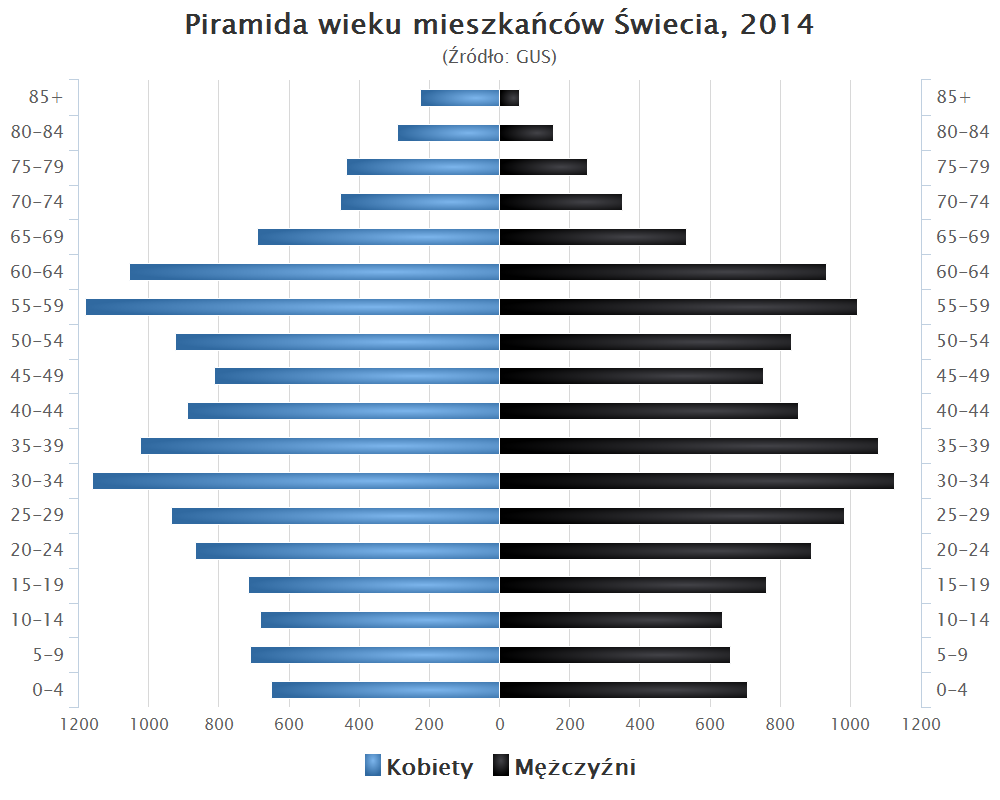

Age pyramid of the female (left) and male (right) inhabitants of Świecie in 2014, according to Central Statistical Office, Poland.

Historical population

Year	Number
1788	1,780
1831	2,660
1837	approx. 3,000
1875	5,210
1880	5,946
1890	6,716
1905	7,747
1931	8,730
1943	11,664
2008	25,614

Above table is based on primary, potentially biased, sources.

Various sights of Świecie

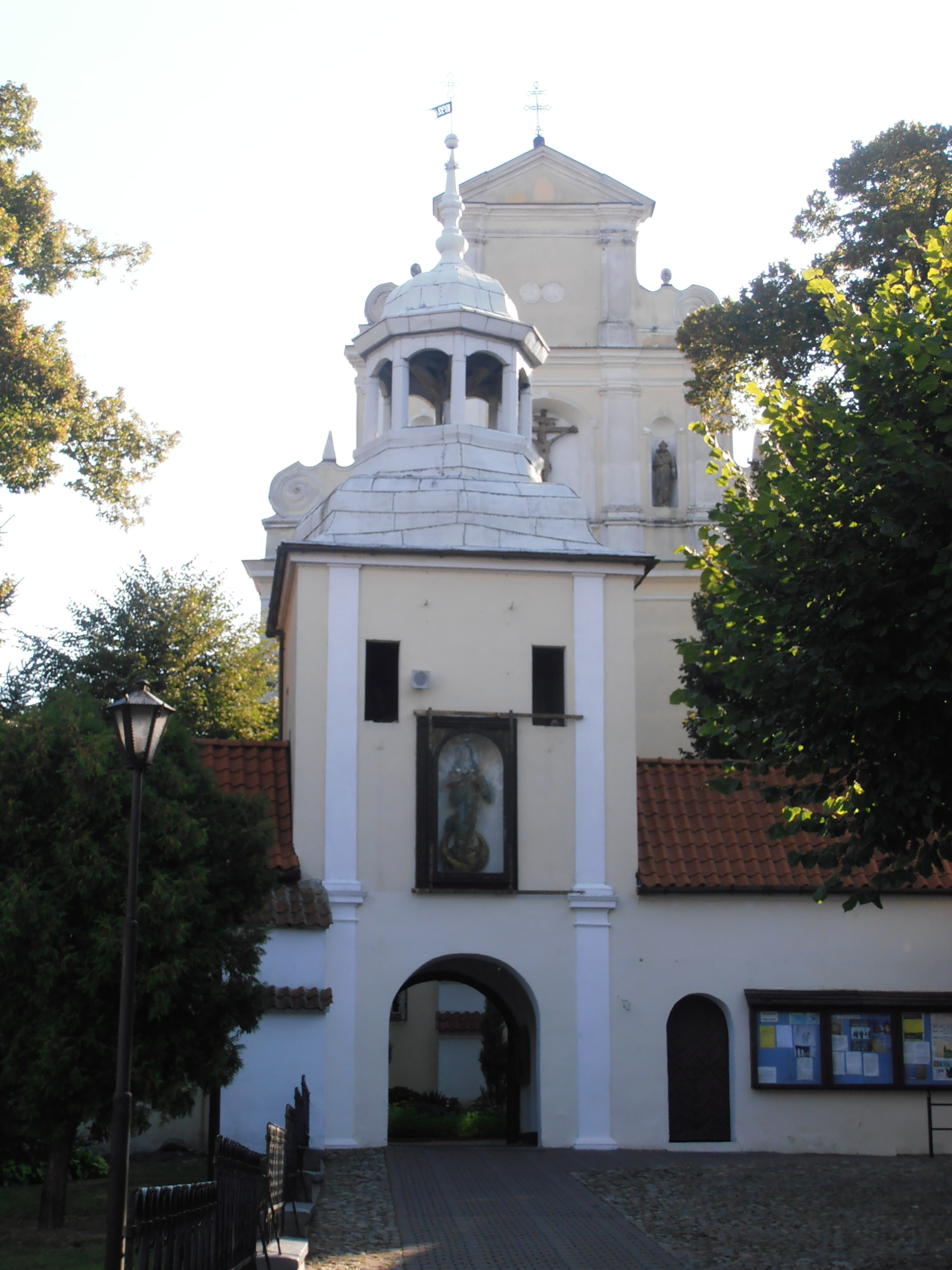
Baroque Immaculate Conception church

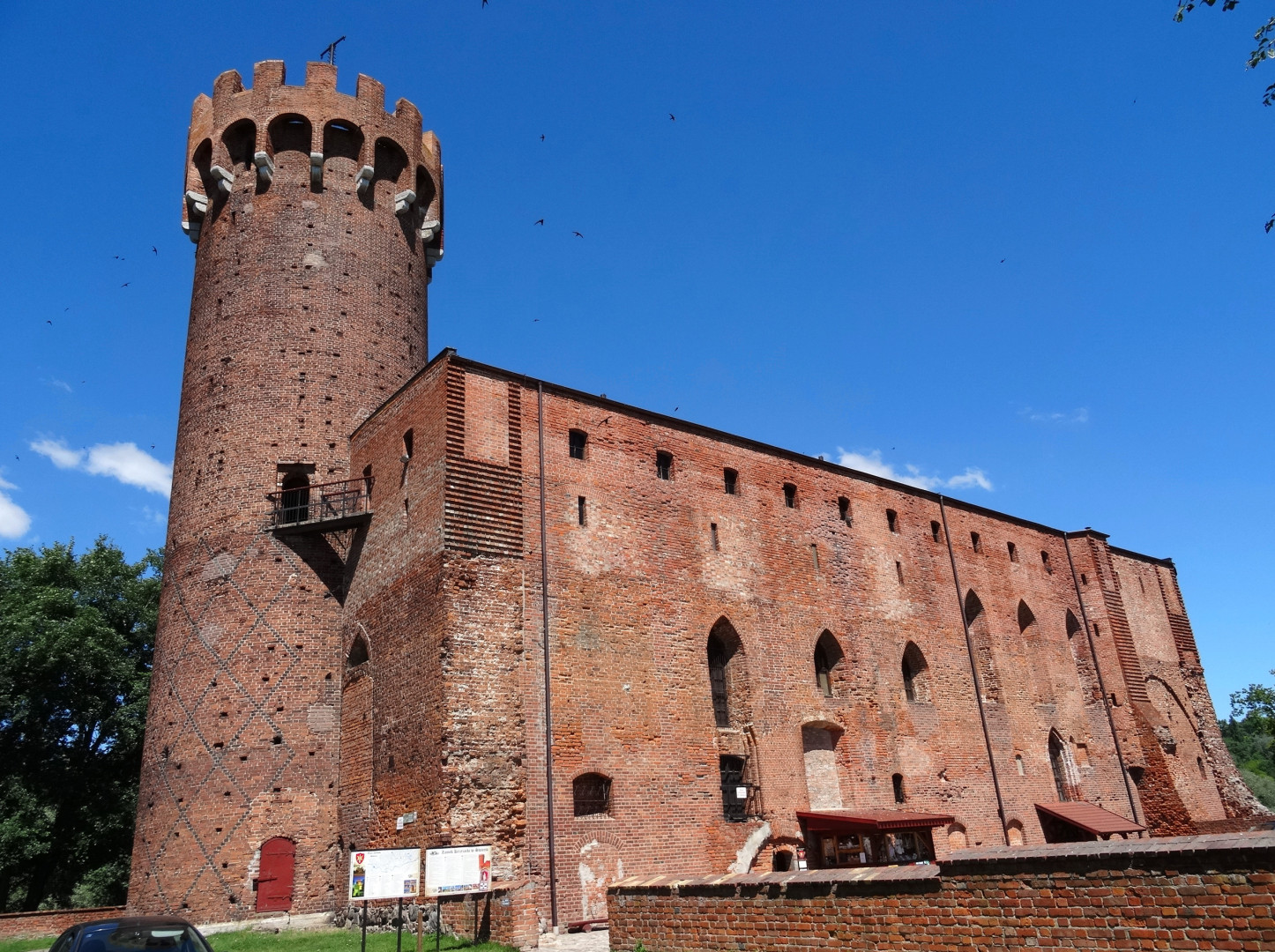
Świecie Castle

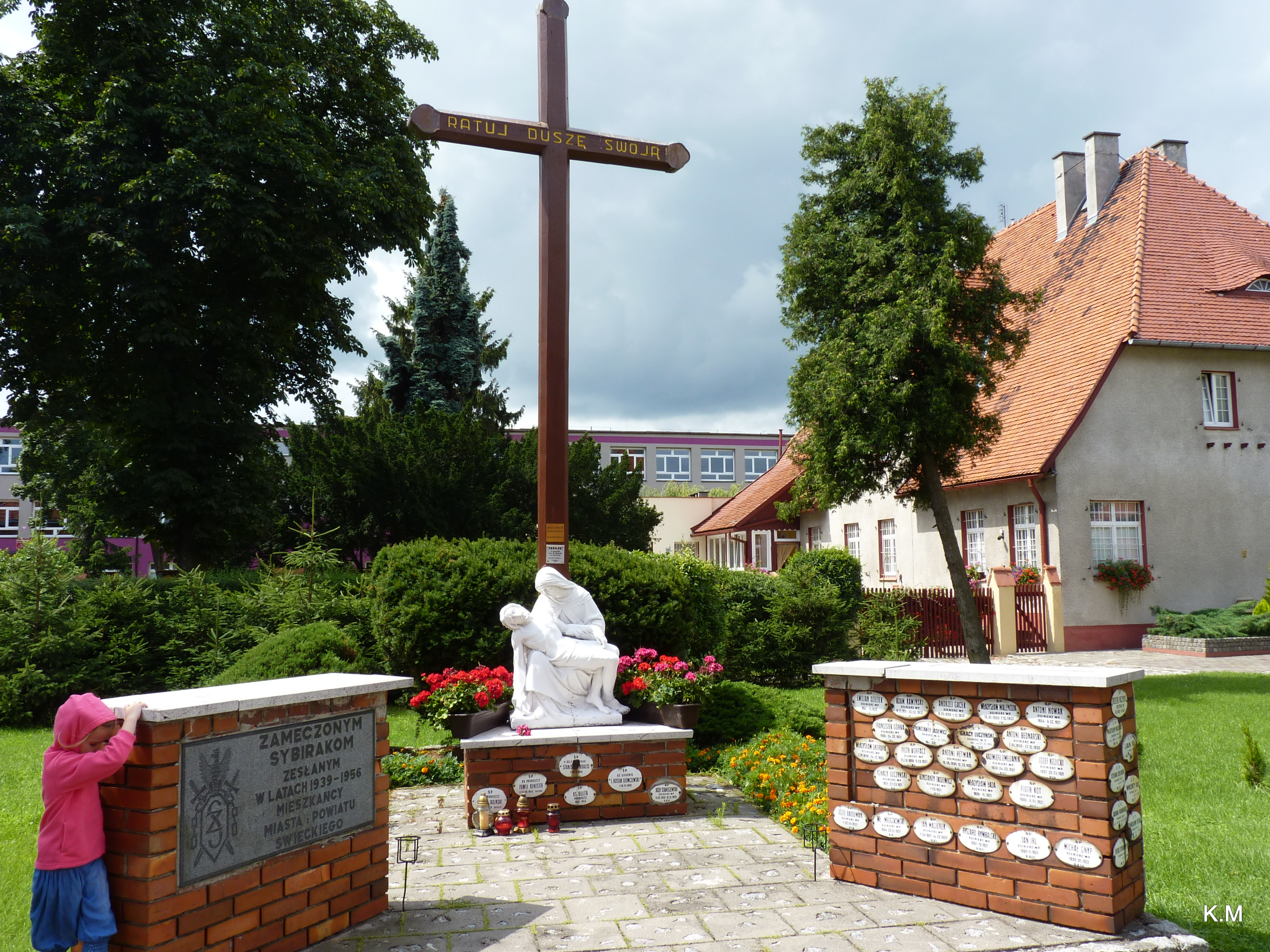
Memorial to local Poles fallen in the Polish–Soviet War in 1919–1921 or deported to Siberia in 1939–1956

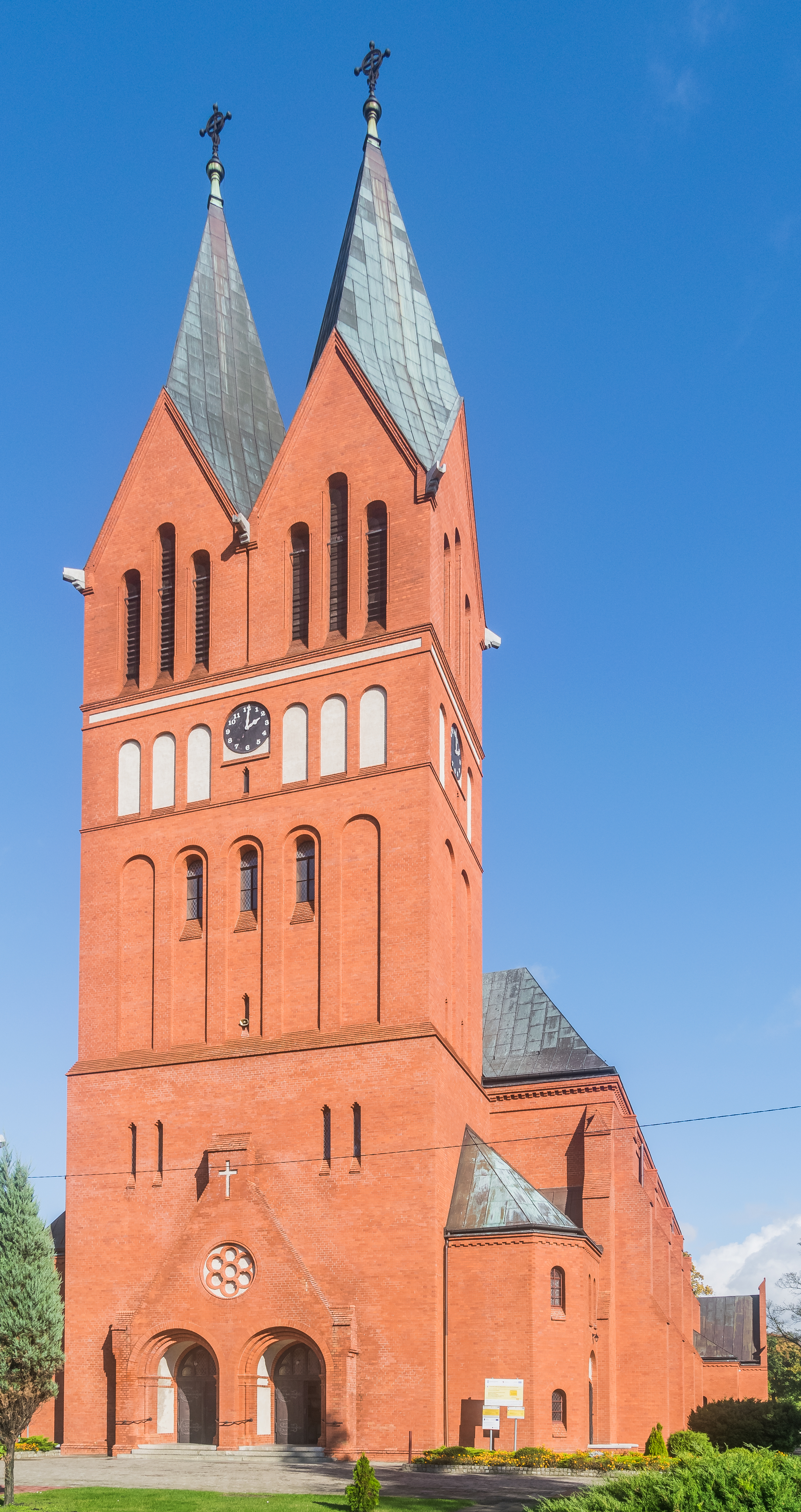
Saint Andrew Bobola church

== Culture ==
There is a Museum of Firefighting (Muzeum Pożarnictwa) in Świecie.

== Major corporations ==
- Mondi Świecie SA (before, known as Mondi Packaging Paper Świecie SA, and Frantschach Świecie SA as well as Celuloza Świecie SA) – paper products and packaging

== Education ==
- Wyższa Szkoła Menedżerska (Higher School of Management)
- I LO im. Floriana Ceynowy
- II LO w Świeciu
- Zespół Szkół Ponadgimnazjalnych

== Sport ==
- Wda Świecie football club
- Polpak Świecie basketball team

== Notable residents ==
- Heinrich von Plauen (the Elder) (ca. 1370–1429), 27th grand master of the Teutonic Order
- Oskar Cassel (1849–1923), German liberal politician
- Kazimierz Eckstein (1896–1939), Polish teacher
- Nikolaus von Halem (1905–1944), German lawyer and resistance fighter
- Rolf Stein (1911–1999), German-French Sinologist and Tibetologist
- Günther Radusch (1912-1988), Luftwaffe pilot
- Henryk Olszewski (born 1932), Polish legal historian, professor, academic lecturer
- Roman Landowski (1937–2007), Polish writer and publicist
- Janusz Józefowicz (born 1959), Polish director, choreographer, creator of Metro (musical)
- Jacek Bobrowicz (born 1962), retired Polish football player
- Jan Zwolicki (born 1967), Polish painter
- Aleksy Kuziemski (born 1977), Polish professional boxer
- Dawid Konarski (born 1989), Polish volleyball player, member of the Poland men's national volleyball team, 2014 and 2018 World Champion
- Paweł Paczkowski (born 1993), Polish handball player, member of the Poland men's national handball team
- Katarzyna Wenerska (born 1993), volleyball player
