= Piotr Przyborek =

21st-century Polish Catholic bishop

- Auxiliary Bishop of Gdańsk
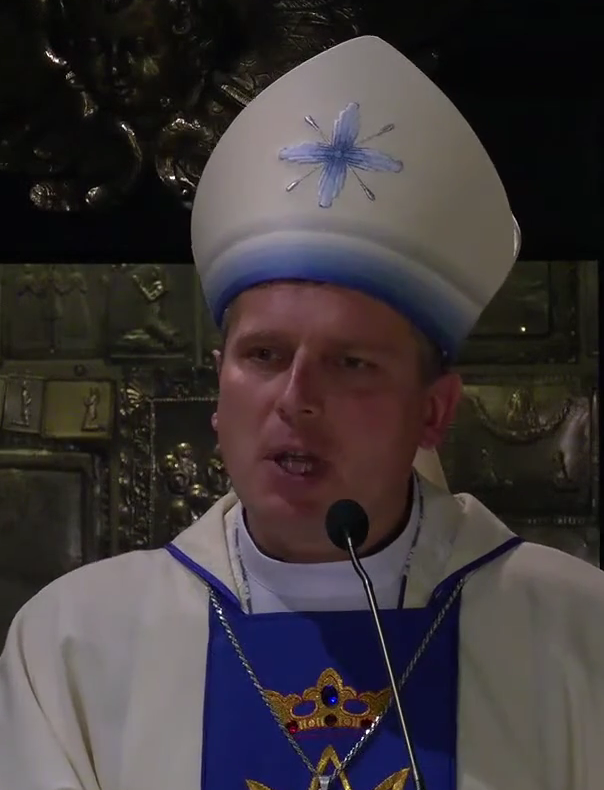
- Church: Roman Catholic Church
- Province: Gdańsk
- In office: 6 July 2022 –
- Other post: Titular Bishop of Musti in Numidia

Orders
- Ordination: 16 June 2001 by Tadeusz Gocłowski
- Consecration: 20 August 2022 by Tadeusz Wojda
- Rank: Bishop

Personal details
- Born: 28 June 1976 (age 49) Gdańsk, Poland
- Motto: Jesteśmy dziećmi Bożymi
- Coat of arms

Piotr Przyborek (born 28 June 1976) is a Polish Roman Catholic bishop, who is one of two Auxiliary Bishops in the Archdiocese of Gdańsk together with Wiesław Szlachetka, as well as being the Titular Bishop of Musti in Numidia.

== Biography ==
=== Early life ===
Przyborek was born on 28 June 1976 in Gdańsk. Between the year 1995 and 2001, Przborek was studying at the Gdańsk Theological Seminary before being ordained on 16 June 2001 at the St. Mary's Church, Gdańsk by the Archbishop of Gdańsk, Tadeusz Gocłowski. In 2005, he obtained the Licentiate of Sacred Theology in Biblical theology at the Cardinal Stefan Wyszyński University, Warsaw. In the years 2009 and 2010, Przyborek studied the Biblical archaeology and Biblical studies at the École Biblique in Jerusalem. In 2011, at the Nicolaus Copernicus University in Toruń, Przyborek received his doctorate in Biblical studies.

=== Ordination as Bishop ===
On 6 July 2022, Pope Francis appointed Przyborek as the new Auxiliary Bishop in the Archdiocese of Gdańsk as well as the Titular Bishop of Musti in Numidia. He was consecrated on 20 August 2022 at the Oliwa Cathedral by the Archbishop of Gdańsk, Tadeusz Wojda, with help from the apostolic nuncio to Poland, Salvatore Pennacchio, and the Bishop of Koszalin–Kołobrzeg, Zbigniew Zieliński, whom Przyborek was replacing as Auxiliary Bishop. For his episcopal motto, he chose "Jesteśmy dziećmi Bożymi" (We are the children of God).
