= Parish of Therese of the Child Jesus, Gdańsk =

Roman Catholic parish in Gdańsk, Poland

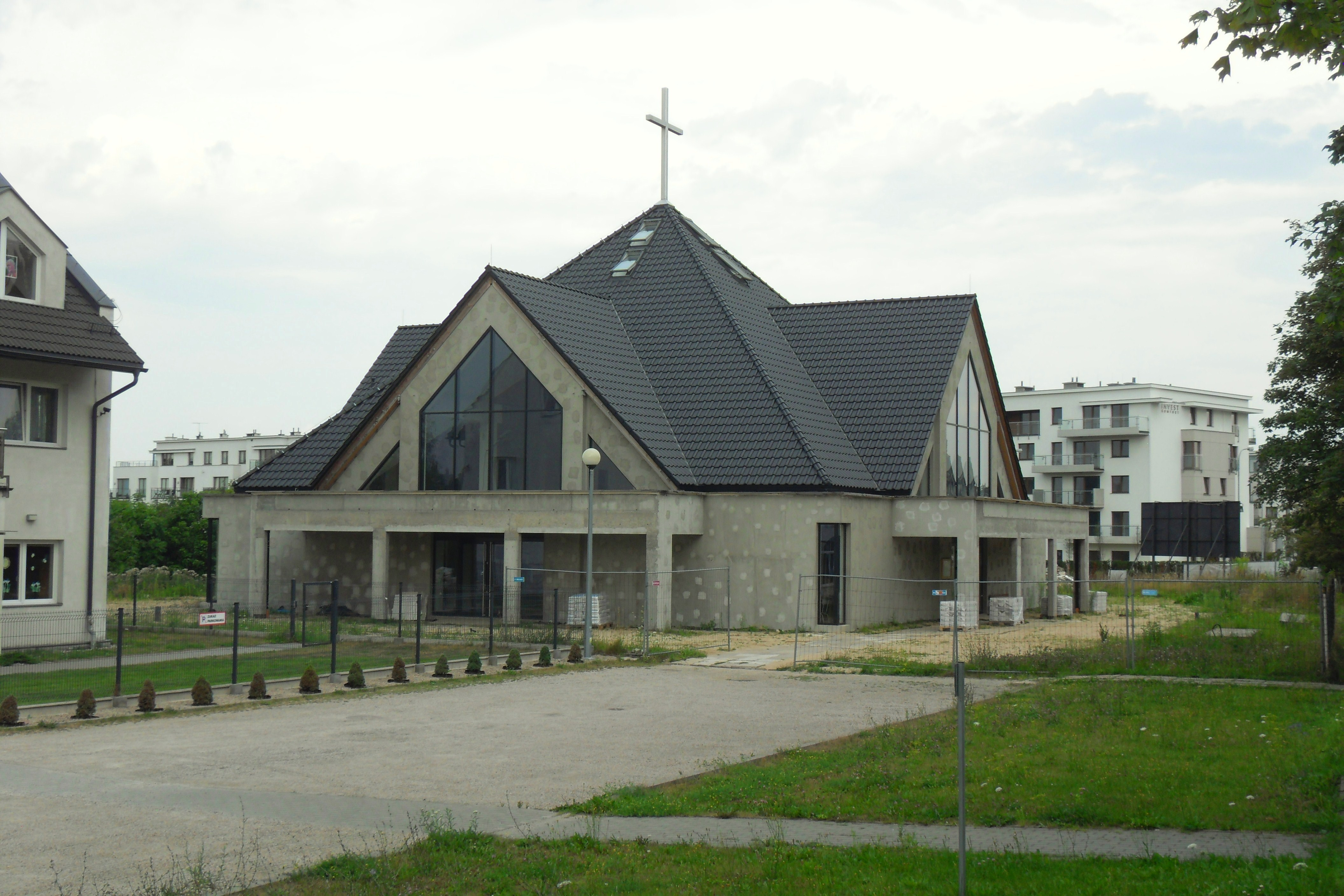
Parish church under construction

The Parish of Therese of the Child Jesus is a Roman Catholic parish in the Gdańsk-Siedlce Deanery, within the Archdiocese of Gdańsk. It was erected in 2002 by then-Archbishop Tadeusz Gocłowski.

== History ==
The Parish of Therese of the Child Jesus was formed by separating parts of the Gdańsk parishes of St. Maximilian Kolbe in Suchanino and Christ the King. On 12 June 2000, Archbishop Tadeusz Gocłowski ordered the creation of a new pastoral centre in the Suchanino district of Gdańsk, assigning Father Andrzej Bemowski, then a vicar at the Parish of Christ the King, to the task. On 15 July 2002, Archbishop Gocłowski formally erected the parish, designating the Church of Saint Therese of the Child Jesus, built by the parish, as its parish church. Until its completion, a chapel of the same name at 35 Powstańców Warszawskich Street served as the parish temple. Bishop Zygmunt Pawłowicz consecrated the chapel on 25 August 2002.

Five years later, on 1 January 2007, a plot was purchased from the State Treasury for a parish house and church. On 30 September 2007, Bishop Pawłowicz blessed the construction site and a cross in front of the parish house. Over two years later, in October 2009, the church design was approved. Construction began on 19 May 2010. Since May 2013, Mass has been celebrated in the new church every Sunday and on holy days. On 29 September 2013, marking the 140th anniversary of Saint Therese's birth, Archbishop Sławoj Leszek Głódź laid a cornerstone blessed by Pope John Paul II in the Vatican on 5 September 1986.

== Community and pastoral activities ==
In 2010, a non-public preschool opened in the parish house.

== Parish communities ==
The following communities operate within the parish:

- Liturgical Altar Service
- Children's Schola
- Living Rosary (4 groups):
  - Saint Therese of the Child Jesus
  - Saint Pio
  - Saint Anne
  - Saint Adalbert
- Parish Council
- Parish Caritas
- Marana-tha Community
- Apostolate of the Queen of Peace and Vocations
- Divine Mercy Community

== Parish territory ==
No.	District	Streets
1	Aniołki	Kolonia Przybyszewskiego, Giełgud, Kolonia Jordana, Kolonia Ochota, Kolonia Praca, Dąbrowski, Żołnierska, Kozietulski, Poniatowski, Świdnicka, Foch
2	Suchanino	Taborowa, Cygańska Góra, 45–53 Powstańców Warszawskich
3	Siedlce	Ojcowska, 88–94 Wyczółkowski, 35–41 Powstańców Warszawskich

== Clergy ==
=== Parson ===
- Since 15 July 2002 – Canon Andrzej Bemowski

=== Vicars ===
- 15 July 2002 – 20 August 2007 – Father Roman Naleziński (later parson of the Parish of St. Simon of Lipnica in Koleczkowo)
- 20 August 2007 – 30 June 2012 – Father Krzysztof Ławrukajtis (later vicar at the Parish of St. Bridget in Gdańsk)
- 1 July 2012 – 30 June 2013 – Father Karol Pstrągowski (later vicar at the Parish of St. Hedwig Queen in Gdynia)
- 1 July 2013 – 30 June 2016 – Father Artur Słomka (later vicar at the Parish of St. Christopher in Gdańsk)
- 1 July 2016 – 30 June 2019 – Father Tomasz Dunst (later vicar at the Parish of Our Lady of the Rosary in Gdynia)
- Since 1 July 2019 – Father Piotr Tartas
