= Tadeusz Gocłowski =

Polish Roman Catholic archbishop

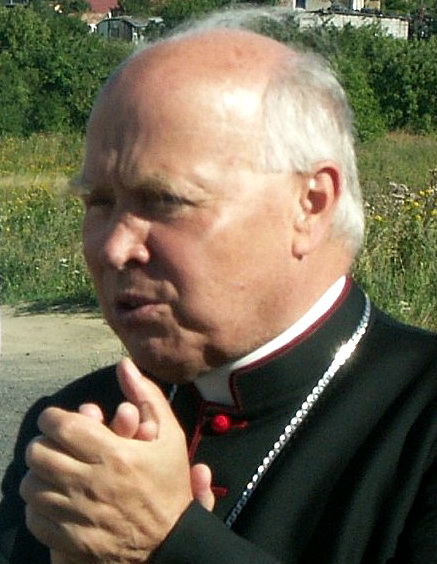
- Tadeusz Gocłowski (2008)
- Born: September 16, 1931; Piski
- Died: May 3, 2016 (aged 84); Gdańsk
- Burial place: Oliwa Cathedral
- Years active: 1983–1984 (Auxiliary Bishop of Gdańsk); 1984–2008 (Diocesan Bishop of Gdańsk)
- Religion: Catholicism
- Church: Latin Church
- Congregations served: Congregation of the Mission

Tadeusz Gocłowski, C.M. (16 September 1931 – 3 May 2016) was a Roman Catholic archbishop.

Ordained to the priesthood in 1956, Gocłowski served as auxiliary bishop of the Roman Catholic Archdiocese of Gdańsk, Poland, from 1983 to 1984. Then he served as bishop of the diocese from 1984 to 1992. In 1992, Gocłowski was elevated to archbishop serving until 2008. He took care for the usage of Kashubian language in liturgy.

== Biography ==
Tadeusz Gocłowski was born on 16 September 1931 in Piski. From 1946 to 1951, he studied at the Minor Seminary of the Congregation of the Mission of Saint Vincent de Paul in Kraków. He passed his maturity exam externally at the King John III Sobieski 2nd High School. In October 1949, he was accepted into the Congregation of the Mission. He took perpetual vows on 15 December 1951. From 1951 to 1956, he pursued philosophical and theological studies at the Theological Institute of the Congregation of the Mission in Kraków. He was ordained a priest on 24 June 1956 in the Church of the Conversion of St. Paul the Apostle in Kraków by Stanisław Rospond, auxiliary bishop of Kraków. He continued his studies from 1956 to 1959 at the Faculty of Canon Law of the John Paul II Catholic University of Lublin, earning a Licentiate of Sacred Theology. From 1969 to 1970, he studied at the Faculty of Canon Law of the Pontifical University of Saint Thomas Aquinas in Rome, where, in 1970, he obtained a doctorate based on his dissertation Post-Tridentine diocesan seminaries entrusted to the leadership of the Congregation of the Mission – particularly in Poland.

He was a member of the liturgical commission and the preparatory commission for the second synod of the Gdańsk diocese, held in 1972. From 1982 to 1983, he served as a defender of the marriage bond in the Gdańsk diocesan court. In 1970, he became a consultor to the Primate's Tribunal in Warsaw, and in 1976, a member of the Polish Bishops' Conference Commission for the Pastoral Care of the Polish Diaspora. From 1981 to 1983, he was the editor of the semi-annual church history journal Nasza Przeszłość.

From 1959 to 1960, he lectured at the Theological Institute of the Congregation of the Mission in Kraków, and from 1960 to 1968, at the Gdańsk Theological Seminary. He served as rector of the Gdańsk seminary from 1971 to 1973 and from 1982 to 1983. From 1973 to 1982, he was the visitor (superior) of the Polish province of the Congregation of the Mission in Kraków.

On 22 March 1983, he was appointed auxiliary bishop of the Archdiocese of Gdańsk with the titular see of Beneventum. He received episcopal consecration on 17 April 1983 in the St. Mary's Church in Gdańsk, conferred by Cardinal Józef Glemp, Primate of Poland, assisted by Lech Kaczmarek, diocesan bishop of Gdańsk, and Albin Małysiak, auxiliary bishop of Kraków. He adopted the episcopal motto Credite Evangelio (Trust in the Gospel). From 1983 to 1984, he served as vicar general of the diocese. In 1983, he was appointed prelate of the Gdańsk cathedral chapter. In 1984, he administered the diocese following the death of Bishop Lech Kaczmarek.

On 31 December 1984, he was appointed diocesan bishop of the Archdiocese of Gdańsk. He made his ingress to the Oliwa Cathedral on 2 February 1985. On 25 March 1992, with the establishment of the Gdańsk Metropolia, he was elevated to metropolitan bishop. He received the pallium in St. Peter's Basilica in Rome on 29 June 1992. In the 1980s, he was among the Catholic hierarchs most actively supporting the Solidarity movement. He participated in meetings organized at the apartment of Father Stanisław Bogdanowicz with Lech Wałęsa and his associates and advisors. Between 1988 and 1989, he took part in the Magdalenka talks, which paved the way for the Polish Round Table Agreement. In 1989, he was a co-founder of the Institute for Market Economy Research in Gdańsk and joined its Foundation Council. He also engaged in political activities during the Third Republic. Before the 1993 parliamentary election, he organized a meeting of right-wing party leaders, leading to the formation of the Catholic Electoral Committee "Fatherland". After the 1997 election, he invited Solidarity Electoral Action parliamentarians to his residence, urging them to form a coalition with the Freedom Union. In the same year, he suspended Father Henryk Jankowski as pastor for delivering a sermon protesting "excessive Jewish influence in government". On 30 October 2005, he organized final post-election coalition talks between leaders of Civic Platform and Law and Justice, which were unsuccessful. He initiated the Gdański Areopag debate series. He hosted Pope John Paul II in his diocese during the pontiff's apostolic visits to Poland in 1987 and 1999. On 17 April 2008, Pope Benedict XVI accepted his resignation as metropolitan archbishop of Gdańsk.

Within the Polish Bishops' Conference, he was part of the Main Council (from 1996, the Permanent Council), chaired the Commission for the Pastoral Care of Workers and the Commission for the Pastoral Care of Seafarers, and served on the Commissions for Seminaries, Religious Orders, Legal Affairs, and Iustitia et Pax. He was also the liaison for emeritus bishops. From 1996 to 2004, he co-chaired the Joint Commission of the Polish Government and the Bishops' Conference. He chaired the Committee for the Apostolic Visit of Pope John Paul II to Poland in 1999. He was a member of the Pontifical Council for the Pastoral Care of Migrants and Itinerant People and the Dicastery for Bishops.

He was a co-consecrator during the consecrations of Gdańsk auxiliary bishops Zygmunt Pawłowicz (1985), Ryszard Kasyna (2005), and Zbigniew Zieliński (2015), as well as auxiliary bishop of Warmia Jacek Jezierski (1994) and auxiliary bishop of Toruń Józef Szamocki (2000).

He died on 3 May 2016 at the University Clinical Centre in Gdańsk, following a massive stroke. On 6 May 2016, he was buried in the crypt of Gdańsk bishops in the Oliwa Archcathedral.

== Honours, awards, and legacy ==
In 2011, Polish President Bronisław Komorowski awarded him the Order of the White Eagle. In 2006, he received the Gold Gloria Artis Medal for Merit to Culture, awarded by the Minister of Culture and National Heritage.

He was granted honorary citizenship of Gdynia (2002), Reda (2007), Sopot (2008), Gdańsk (2016), and Wejherowo. In 2006, he declined Gdańsk's honorary citizenship amid concerns it was linked to an upcoming local election campaign. In 2008, he received the Honorary Distinction for Merits to the Pomeranian Voivodeship.

In 1989, he became an honorary member of the Kashubian-Pomeranian Association. In 2001, he received the Stolem Medal from the Pomorania Student Club, in 2003, the Saint Brother Albert Medal, and in 2008, the title of Ambassador of Polish Speech from the Presidium of the Polish Language Council.

In 2016, the Martwa Wisła Tunnel, Poland's first underwater road tunnel, was named in his honour.

== See also ==
- Parish of Therese of the Child Jesus, Gdańsk - erected in 2002 by Gocłowski

== Bibliography ==
- Hall, Aleksander (2011). Osobista historia III Rzeczypospolitej [Personal History of the Third Polish Republic] (in Polish). Warsaw: Rosner i Wspólnicy. ISBN 978-83-60336-42-7.
- Media related to Tadeusz Gocłowski at Wikimedia Commons
