= Wiesław Szlachetka =

21st-century Polish Catholic bishop

- Auxiliary Bishop of Gdańsk
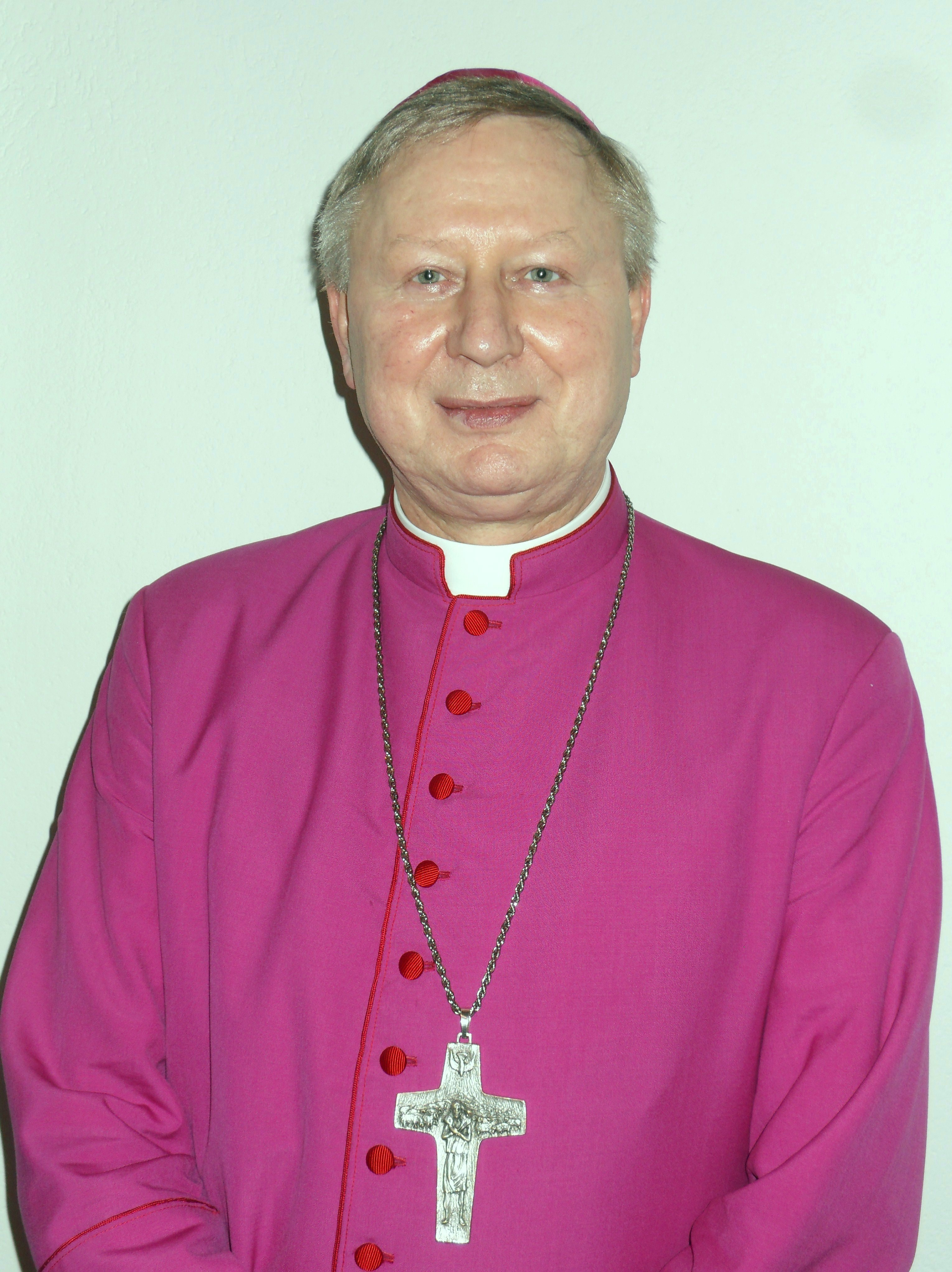
- Wiesław Szlachetka (2014)
- Church: Roman Catholic Church
- Province: Gdańsk
- In office: 21 December 2013 –
- Other post: Titular Bishop of Vageata

Orders
- Ordination: 20 June 1985 (deacon); 17 May 1986 (priest) by Marian Przykucki
- Consecration: 4 January 2014 by Celestino Migliore
- Rank: Bishop

Personal details
- Born: 21 November 1959 (age 66) Mała Komorza, Poland
- Motto: Magnificate Dominum mecum
- Coat of arms

Wiesław Szlachetka (born 21 November 1959) is a Polish Roman Catholic bishop currently serving as one of two Auxiliary Bishops of the Archdiocese of Gdańsk together with Piotr Przyborek as well as being the Titular Bishop of Vageata.

== Biography ==
=== Early life ===
Szlachetka was born on 21 November 1959 in Mała Komorza. In 1981 he began studying at the Higher Theological Seminary in Pelplin, being ordained a Deacon on the 20 June 1985 before eventually being ordained a priest on 17 May 1986 by Marian Przykucki. He obtained his master's degree in theology in 1986 from the Cardinal Stefan Wyszyński University, Warsaw.

=== Ordination as Bishop ===
On 21 December 2013, Pope Francis appointed Szlachetka as the new Auxiliary Bishop in the Archdiocese of Gdańsk with that, he became the Titular Bishop of Vageata. Szlachetka would be consecrated on 4 January 2014 at the Oliwa Cathedral by the apostolic nuncio to Poland, Celestino Migliore, with the help of the Archbishop of Gdańsk, Sławoj Leszek Głódź, and the Archbishop of Gniezno, Henryk Muszyński. For his episcopal motto, he chose "Magnificate Dominum mecum" (Praise the Lord with me).
