= Dominican Church, Lviv =

Greek Catholic church in Lviv, Ukraine

Dominican Church
- Dominican Church and Monastery
- Домініканський костел і монастир
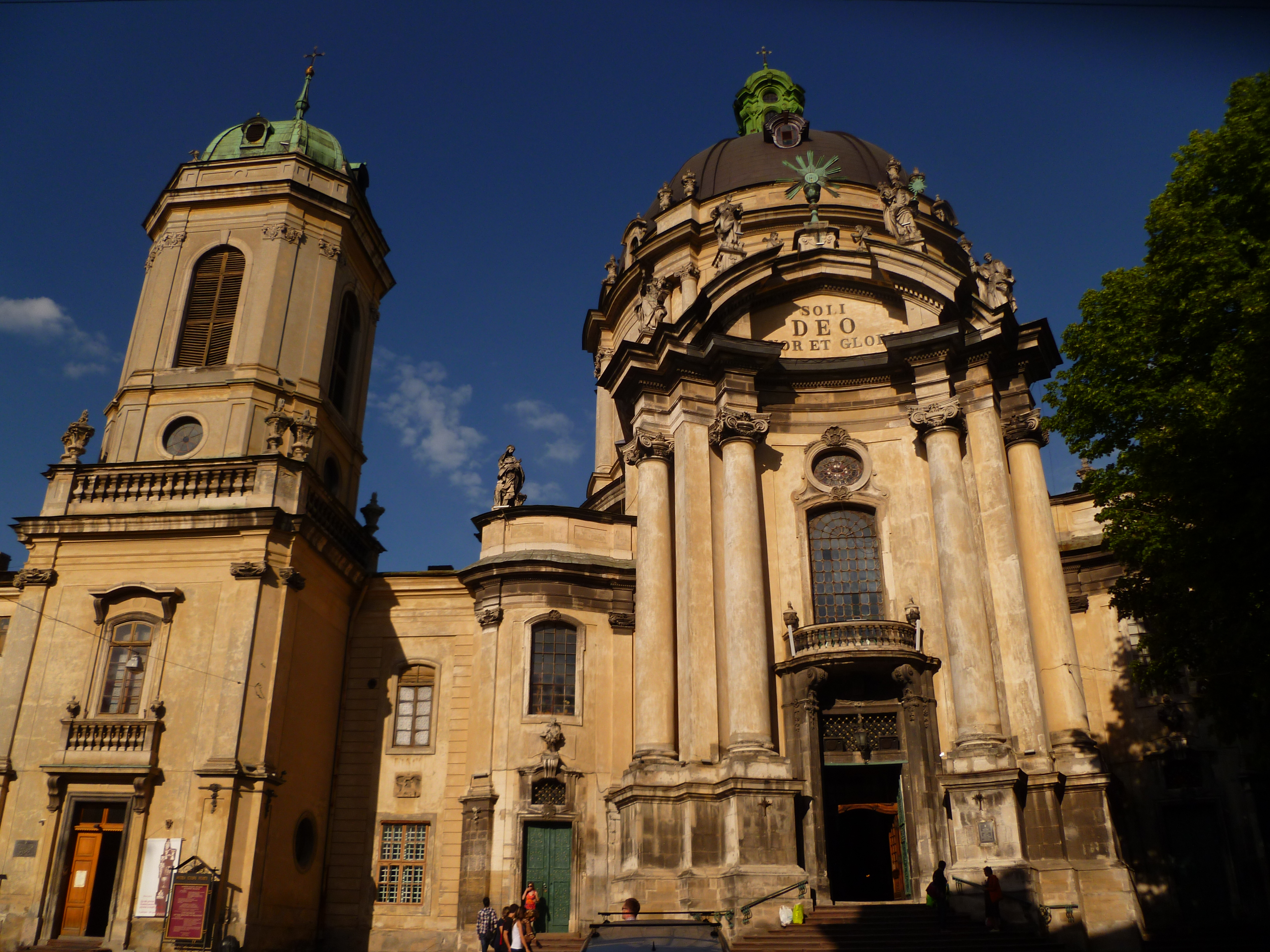
- The church's main façade

- 49°50′34″N 24°2′3″E
- Location: Lviv
- Country: Ukraine
- Denomination: Catholic Church
- Churchmanship: Ukrainian Greek-Catholic Church

History
- Founded: 1749
- Founder: Józef Potocki
- Consecrated: 1764

Architecture
- Architectural type: Baroque

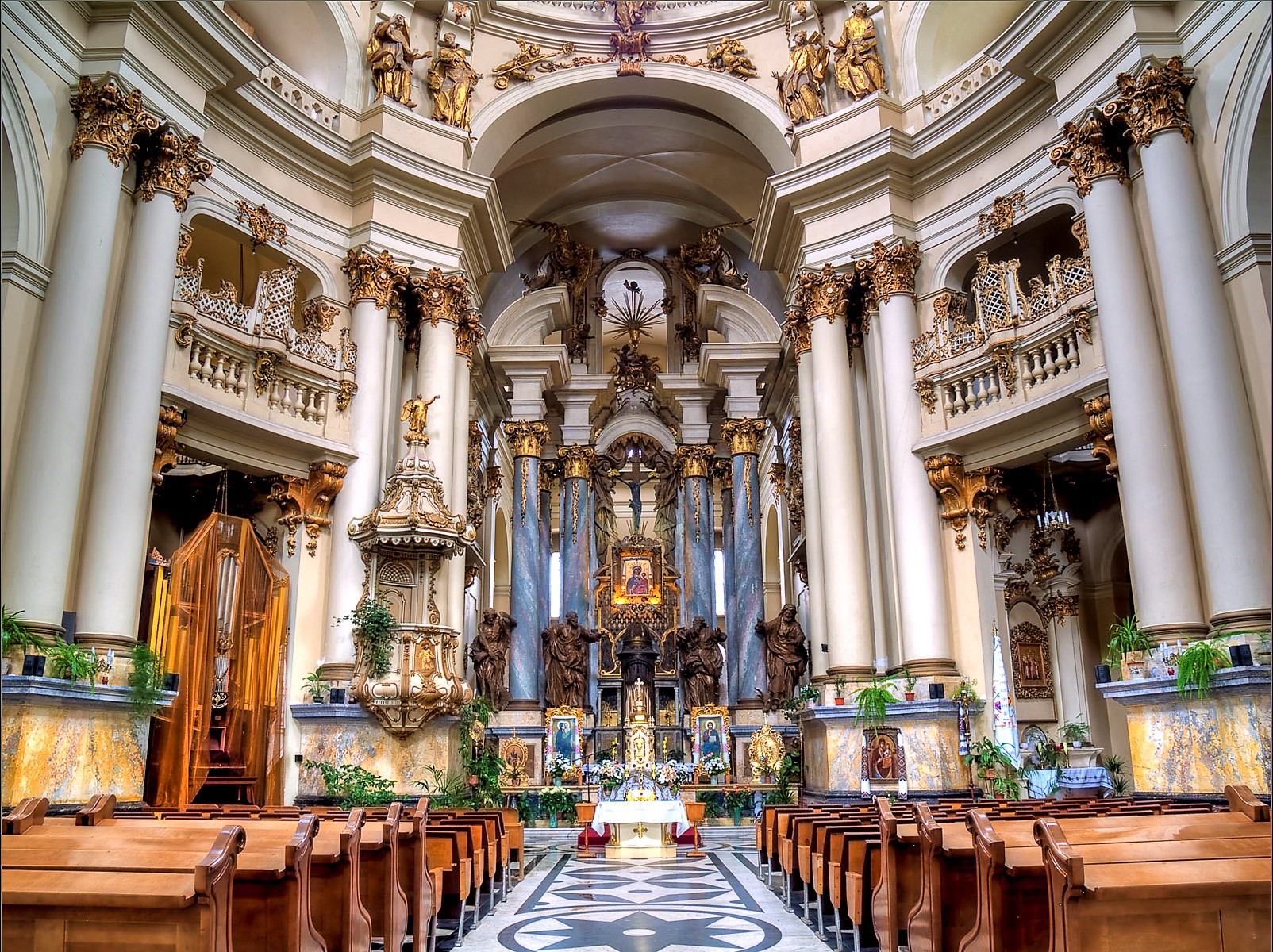
Interior

The Dominican Church and Monastery (Ukrainian: Домініканський костел і монастир, romanized: Dominikanskyi kostel i monastyr, Polish: Kościół i klasztor Dominikanów we Lwowie) in Lviv, Ukraine is located in the city's Old Town, east of the market square. It was originally built as the Roman Catholic Church of Corpus Christi, and today serves as the Greek Catholic Church of the Holy Eucharist.

== History ==
The Dominican Order first arrived in Lviv during the 13th century and the first wooden church is said to have been built in 1234 within the Low Castle, founded by the wife of Leo I of Halych. That church burned down during a war in 1340. A new Gothic church, resembling the parish church in Kazimierz Dolny, was built on the present site in 1378 and later rebuilt after a fire in 1407 along with the monastery buildings. During the 16th century the complex was ravaged by several fires, nevertheless it continued to gradually rise in prosperity. In the 18th century the church's ceiling started cracking and it was decided in 1745 that the church had to be taken apart and replaced with a new one.

In 1749 Józef Potocki laid the cornerstone for the present day Baroque church, commonly attributed to Jan de Witte. Between 1756 and 1761 Mikołaj Bazyli Potocki donated 236,000 złoty to the church and the Dominican monastery in Lviv, where his mother was buried. These donations funded the Potocki chapel in the church. The church was consecrated in 1764 by the Latin archbishop of Lviv Wacław Hieronim Sierakowski (1700-1780).

The Dominicans managed to survive the reign of the Austrian emperor Joseph II, who closed many other monasteries. In 1865 a neo-baroque bell tower was added to the complex. A controversial renovation of its façade and interior was performed in 1885–1914.

After World War II, the complex was occupied by the Soviets, used as a warehouse, and in the 1970s changed into a museum of religion and atheism. With the collapse of the Soviet Union the church was given to the Ukrainian Greek Catholic Church and now serves as a parish church. The monastery, however, has not yet been returned and still serves as a museum (renamed The Lviv Museum of History of Religion).

The church resembles the Karlskirche. It is built on the plan of the Greek Cross inscribed in an ellipsoid and topped with a monumental dome.

Before 1946, the church contained a miraculous icon of the Blessed Virgin Mary, crowned by Pope Benedict XIV in 1751, which can be found today in the Dominican Basilica of St. Nicholas in Gdańsk, and an alabaster figure brought by St. Hyacinth from Mongol-sacked Kiev to Halych and later to Lviv, which now resides in Church of St. Giles in Kraków.

In 2019, the Dominican Church was the location for the Gregorian's music video for their song Viva la Vida.

== See also ==
- 18th-century Western domes
