= Medeli =

Ancient Roman & Berber town in Tunesia

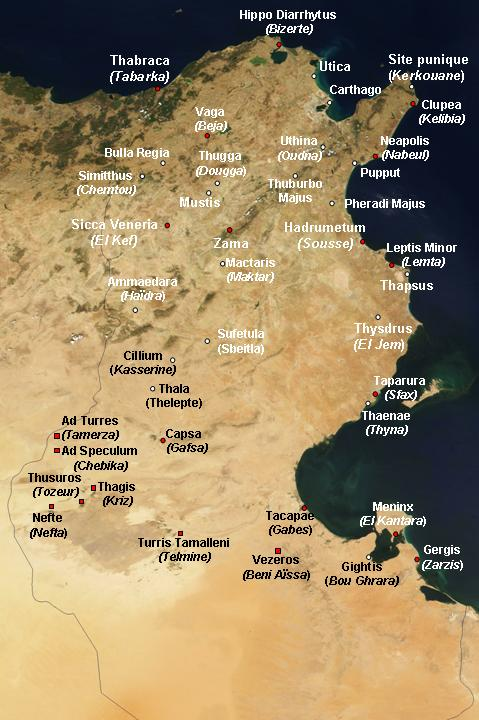
Map of Roman cities in Tunisia

Medeli was an ancient Roman–Berber civitas of the Roman Province of Africa Proconsularis in Tunisia. It has been tentatively identified with Henchir-Mencoub and lasted through the Roman, Vandal and Byzantine empires.

The ancient city was also the seat of an ancient Catholic bishopric the suffragan of the Archdiocese of Carthage. It is difficult to attribute with certainty the bishops to the diocese of Medeli, because of the different variants reported in the manuscripts. Mesnage assigns Iader, who took part in the Council of Carthage (256) of St. Cyprian to discuss the question of the lapsi while Morcelli and Jaubert put this bishop to the diocese of Midila in Numidia. The Donatist Bishop, Liberal, took part in the Conference of Carthage (411). (The city appears to have had no Catholic bishop at this time).

Bishop Felicissimo, intervened at the Council of Carthage (525) though Morcelli attributes this to a hypothetical Bishop Diocese of Sedela not documented otherwise. Today Medeli survives as titular see. Since 2015 the titular bishop of Medeli has been Zbigniew Zieliński, auxiliary bishop of Gdańsk.
