= Sambor I, Duke of Pomerania =

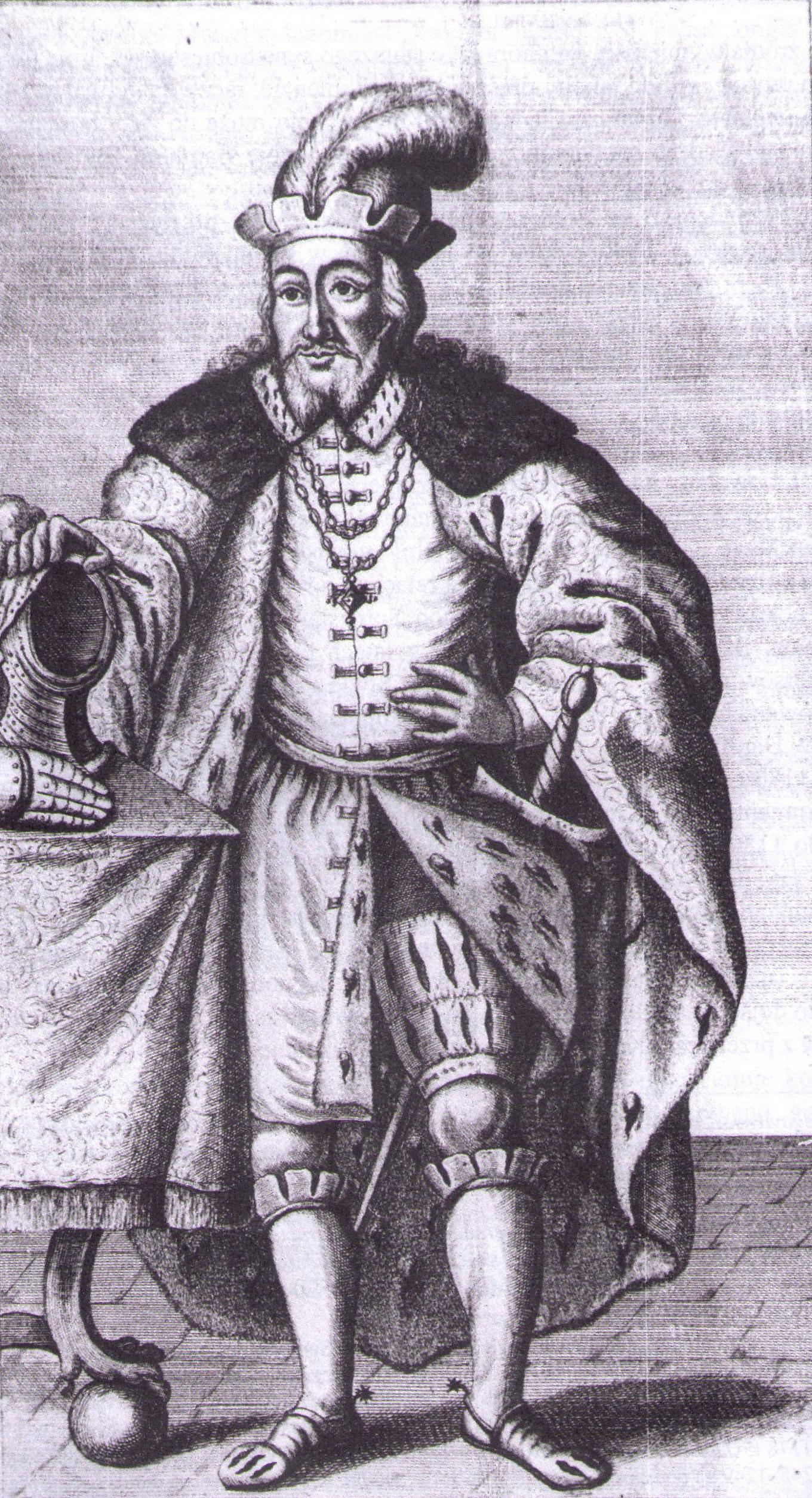
Sambor I, 18th century depiction

Sambor I, princeps Pomoranorum (Kashubian: Sambór I) (c. 1150 – c. 1207) was regent of Pomerelia from 1180 until his death.

He was the elder son of Duke Sobiesław I and an early scion of the Samborides dynasty, which is named after him. According to the Chronica seu originale regum et principum Poloniae by Wincenty Kadłubek, Sambor I between 1177 and 1180 was recognized as Duke of Pomerelia and successor of his father by the Polish High Duke Casimir II the Just. He resided at Gdańsk, where he promoted the immigration of German settlers in the course of the Ostsiedlung and founded the St. Nicholas' Church in about 1190. He is also mentioned in an 1186 deed as the founder of the Cistercian abbey at Oliwa, a filial monastery of Kołbacz.

Sambor was married and had two sons who died at a young age. The 14th-century obituary of Oliwa Abbey denotes the date of his death as 7 February 1207, however, Sambor probably died under the reign of High Duke Władysław III Spindleshanks (1202–1206). He was succeeded by his younger brother Mestwin I.

== See also ==
- List of Pomeranian duchies and dukes

Sambor I, Duke of Pomerania Samborides Born: ~ 1150 Died: ~ 1205
Preceded by Sobiesław I	Duke of Pomerelia; 1177/79–1205	Succeeded by Mestwin I
