= Lubomirski Palace, Lviv =

17th-century palace on Market Square

Coordinates: 49°50′30″N 24°02′00″E

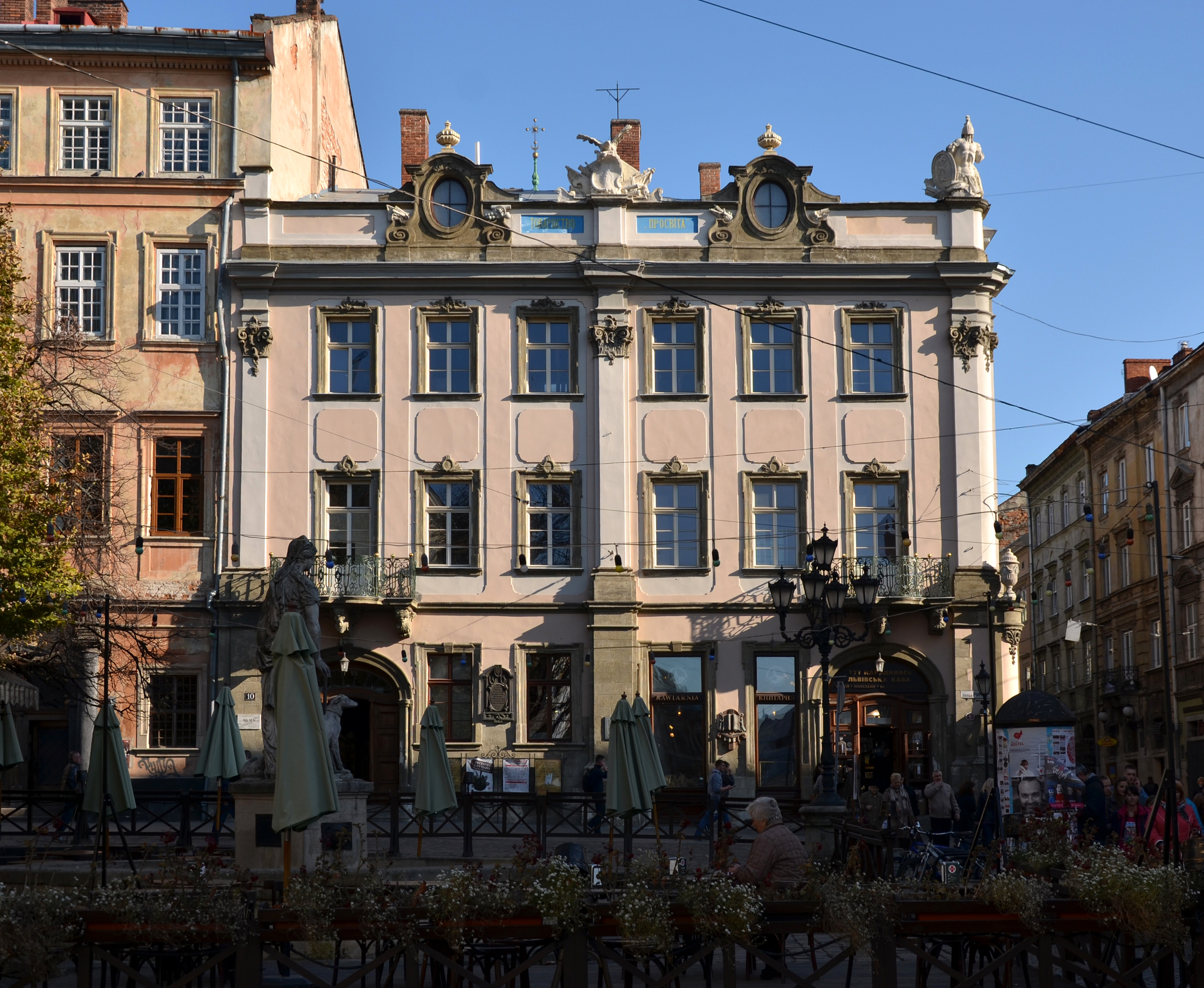
Lubomirski Palace

The Lviv palace of Prince Stanisław Lubomirski was built in the 1760s to Jan de Witte's design on the site of several older houses (one of which had been the property of Szymon Szymonowic). The palace's main façade, featuring decoration by Sebastian Vessinger, is on Market Square. The two other fronts are considerably less conspicuous.

Between 1771 and 1821, the Lubomirski Palace served as the residence for the Austrian governors of Galicia. It was purchased by a Ukrainian organization, Prosvita, in the 19th century and subsequently became a hotbed of nationalist activities. It was there that Yaroslav Stetsko proclaimed Ukraine's independence several days after Nazi Germany's invasion of the Soviet Union.

Next door to the Lubomirski Palace is the former palace of the Roman Catholic archbishops, where King Michał Korybut Wiśniowiecki died in 1673.
