= Jan de Witte =

Polish military engineer

- Born: 8 July 1708; Poltava, Tsardom of Russia, (now Ukraine)
- Died: 22 December 1785 (aged 77); Kamieniec Podolski, Polish–Lithuanian Commonwealth, now (Kamianets-Podilskyi, Ukraine)
- Occupation: Architect
- Buildings: Dominican Church in Lviv, Carmelite church in Berdichiv, Lubomirski Palace in Lviv

Jan de Witte (1709–1785) was a Dutch military engineer, professional officer and architect in the Polish–Lithuanian Commonwealth. The designer of, among others, the Dominican church in Lwów (now Lviv, Ukraine) and the Carmelite monastery in Berdyczów (now Berdychiv, Ukraine), he was also the military commandant of the Kamieniec Podolski fortress (now Kamianets-Podilskyi, Ukraine).

== Personal life ==
Jan de Witte was born in the Russian army encampment near Poltava on 8 July 1709, as a son of Jan de Witte (the Elder), a professional officer coming from a Dutch Protestant family from Dordrecht, at that time employed in the Russian army which waged war with Sweden. In 1718, Jan the Witte (the Elder) joined the military of the Polish–Lithuanian Commonwealth, and took up residence in the town of Kamieniec in Podolia possessing the famous fortress. At that time he probably converted to Roman Catholicism, he also married a local woman from a prominent noble family.

His first son, Jan de Witte (the Younger), after completing schooling in Jesuits' college, joined the ranks of Polish royal artillery corps in February 1726, in which he later served until his death. Being promoted several times (captain in 1735, major in 1751, lieutenant-colonel in 1754, colonel of the artillery in 1762, major-general in 1767), he finally became lieutenant general in 1781, from 1768 being also appointed as the commander of the mentioned Kamieniec fortress and other minor frontier forts in Podolia simultaneously. In 1735 he married Marianna Lubońska who bore him numerous offspring. His career's supporter and promoter was a powerful Polish noble, Grand Crown Hetman Wacław Rzewuski. In his later years he also attracted the attention of King Stanisław August Poniatowski, who, in an act of recognition of his loyal duty, highly rated knowledge and works, awarded him with the Order of St. Stanislaus in 1781. It was Rzewuski who pronounced a recognition of de Witte family's indygenat (the recognition of foreign status as a noble) in 1764, four years later positively approved by the Polish Sejm. Jan de Witte was considered as an authority not only in the art of war, but also in questions concerning the Near East, as he was one of the best-informed specialists in Polish-Turkish affairs. For example, he kept a wide correspondence with the Turkish pashas from Ottoman frontier forts along the Commonwealth's south-eastern border. As a military man he enjoyed a reputation of a rational, but also exceptionally demanding and severe officer, especially among those under his command, which resulted in incapability of gaining affection among his subordinates and goodwill among the military command (for instance, his abilities were often questioned by Alois Friedrich von Brühl, chief general of Polish royal artillery corps). During the course of his military career he managed to amass a small fortune, including the rural estate at Sawiń. De Witte was a passionate collector of coins and medallions, also a great book-lover.

Jan de Witte died on 22 December 1785, and two days later his remains were interred in the cathedral church of Kamieniec, after a grandiose military funeral solemnity.

== Works ==
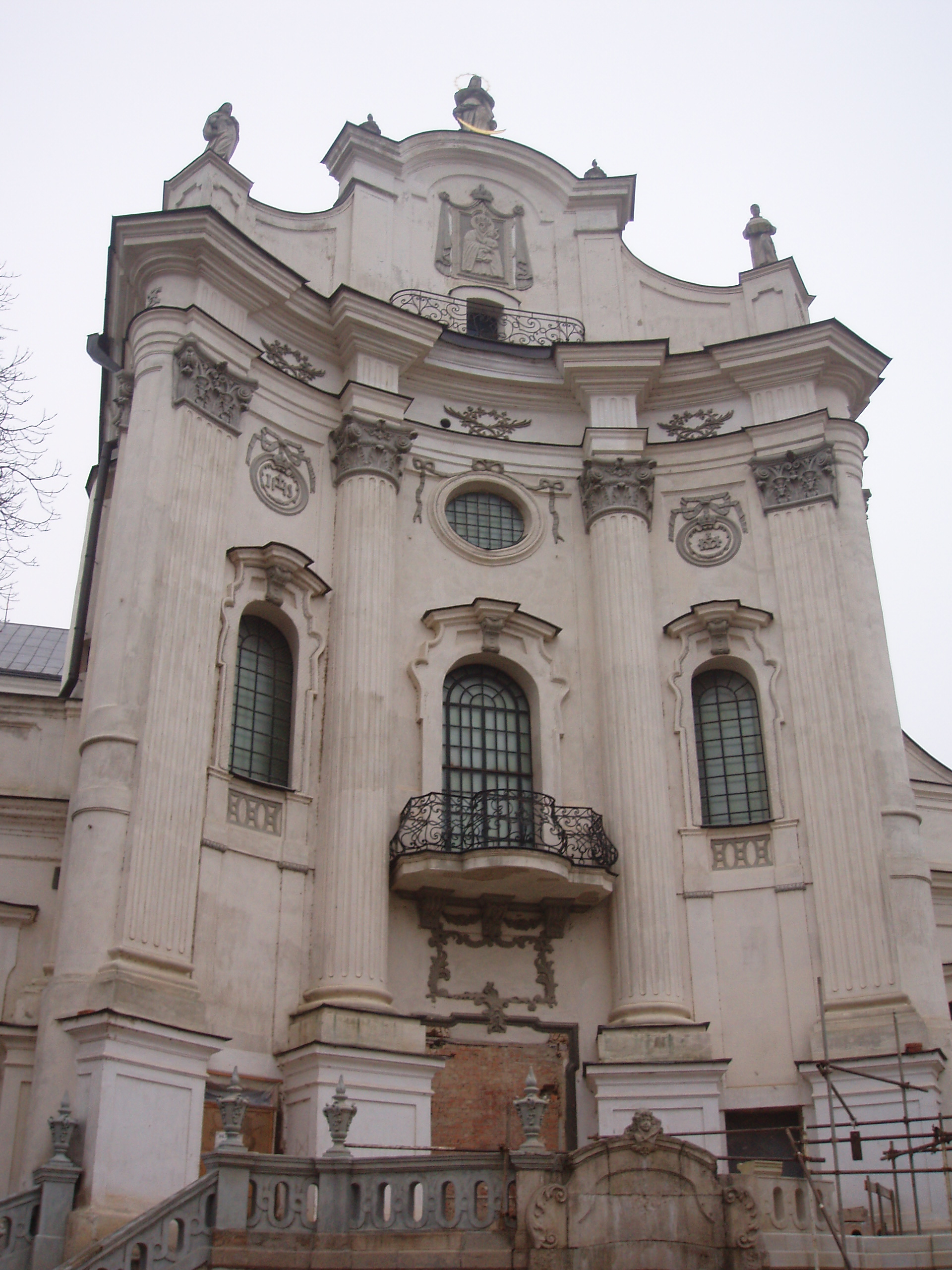
Carmelite church in Berdichiv

Today, Jan de Witte is primarily known as a designer of numerous architectural works in what is now Western Ukraine, which in the 18th century constituted a part of the Polish-Lithuanian Commonwealth.

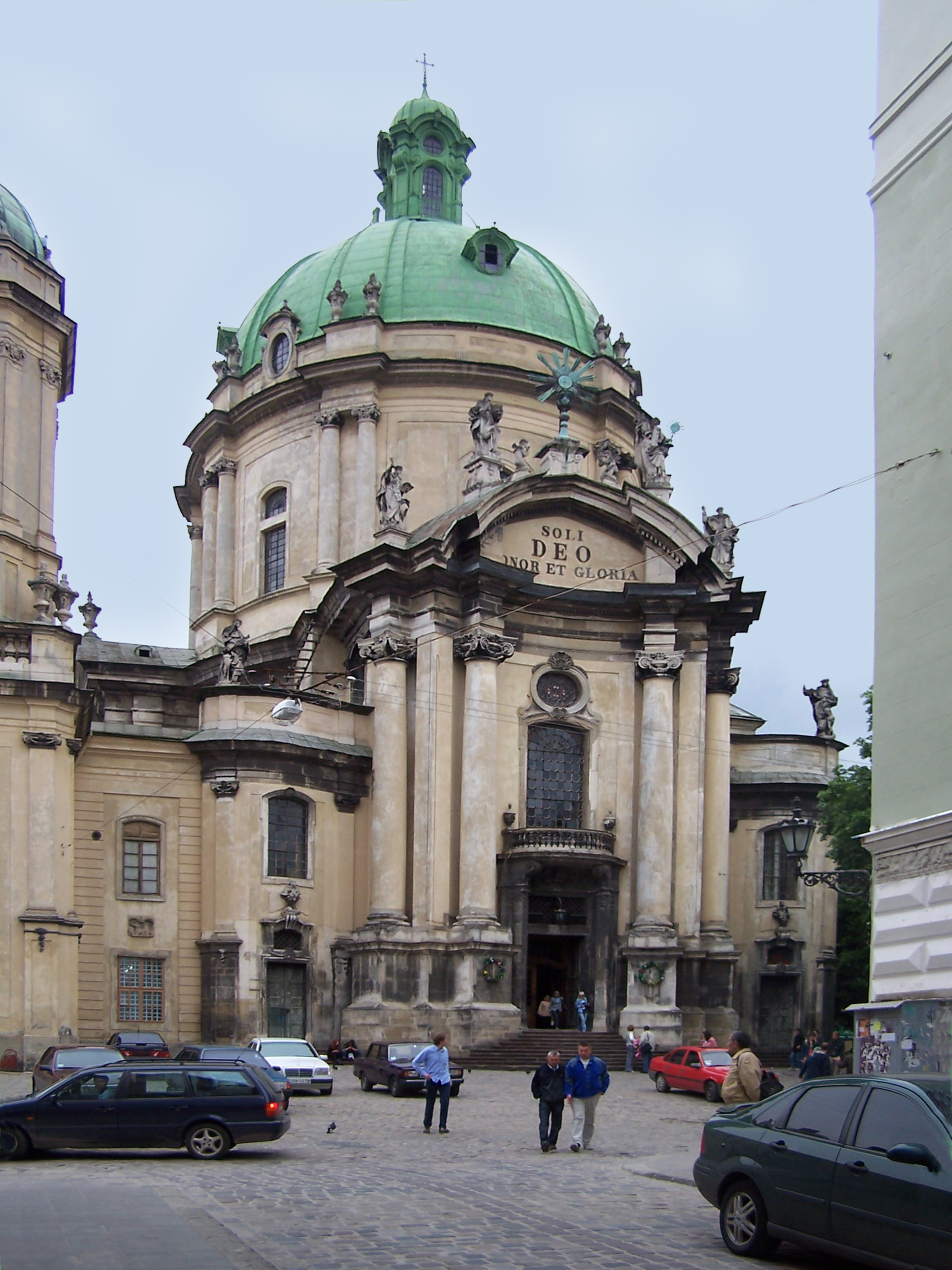
Dominican church in Lviv

Possibly de Witte's first work was the design for the upper church of Barefooted Carmelites monastery in Berdychiv, beginning in 1737 (there exists preserved self-drawn sketches of the church's facade from 1743).

His main works are to be found in Lviv. In the 1740s he probably authored the Rococo redesigning of a town house (no. 2) at the city's old town market square. In 1744 the Dominican brothers of Lwów made a decision to have their old, Gothic temple demolished, due to its very bad condition, and entrusted de Witte with drawing up plans for the new building. The construction works soon started and this very costly architectural investment was ready in its basic form by the year 1759. Subsequently, the interior works begun and the church was eventually consecrated on 29 June 1764. The Dominican church, resembling to some degree and probably also inspired by the works of Fischer von Erlach and Guarini, has the characteristic late Baroque form of a centrally-placed longitudinal oval construction, crowned with an elliptic dome. Until the present it is still one of the crucial landmarks in the city's skyline.

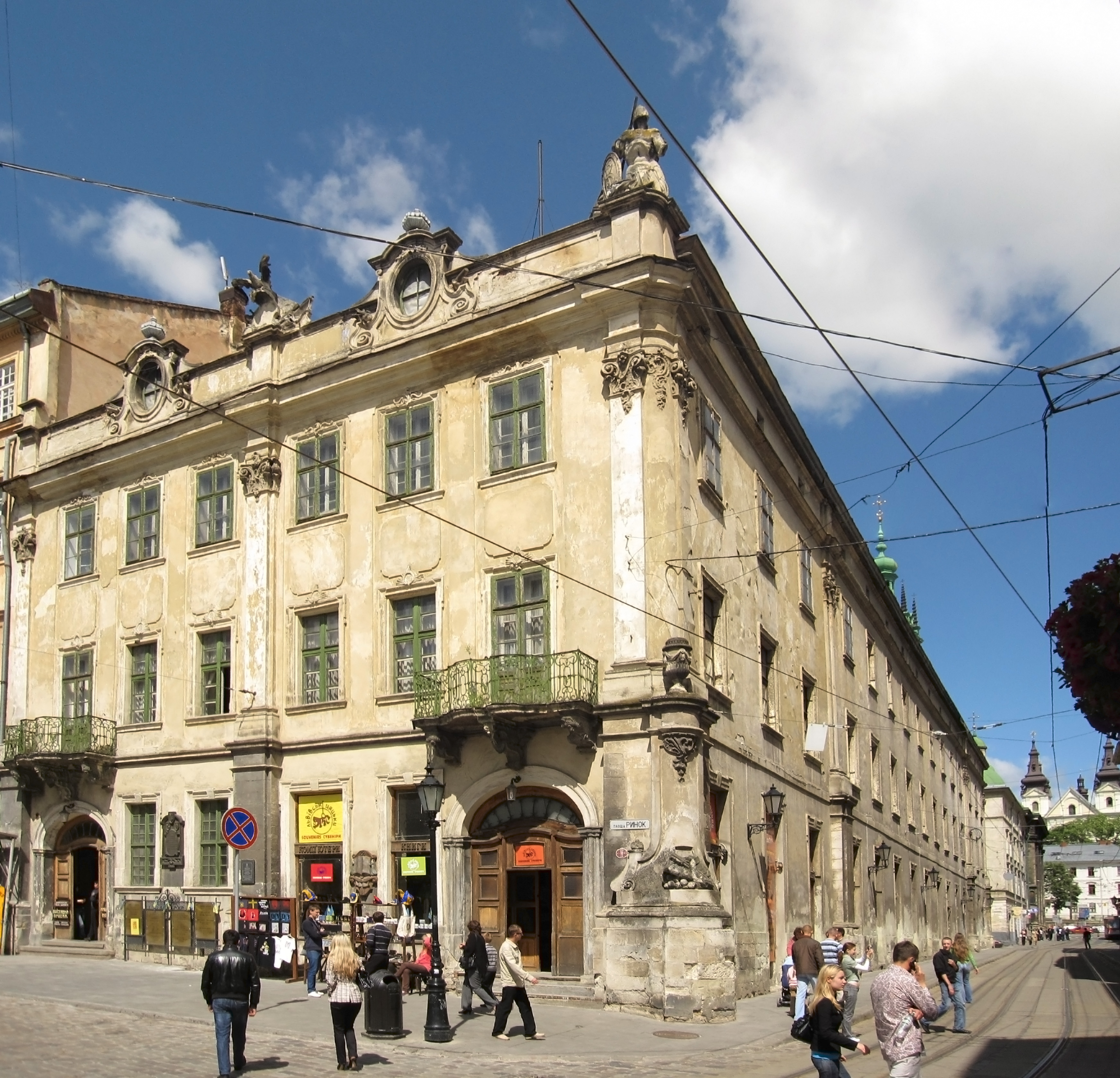
Lubomirski Palace in Lviv

Another of de Witte's works in Lviv is the palace of Lubomirski family, situated on the Market Square. The rebuilding of the previous two merchant town houses into a splendid Rococo residence, at the request of Stanisław Lubomirski, commenced in 1763 and lasted until 1767. De Witte also had drawn the designs for another palace for Lubomirski, located in the Volhynian town of Równe (nowadays Rivne, Ukraine), which was remodeled according to de Witte's project in the years 1765-1770 (the palace was destroyed in 1945).

During his architectural career, De Witte tended to favor above all drawing the designs, as he didn't engage too much in the actual building process which he preferred to leave in the hands of professional building masters and visited the building sites infrequently, restraining himself to offer necessary directions and detailed drawings only.

Stationed at Kamieniec Podolski as an officer of the Corps of Artillery, he also worked on reconstruction and expansion of the old fortress. Among his projects there are the new barracks and the commandants' residence, dubbed de Witte's Garden.
