= Zbigniew Zieliński =

Roman Catholic bishop

- Metropolitan Archbishop of Poznań
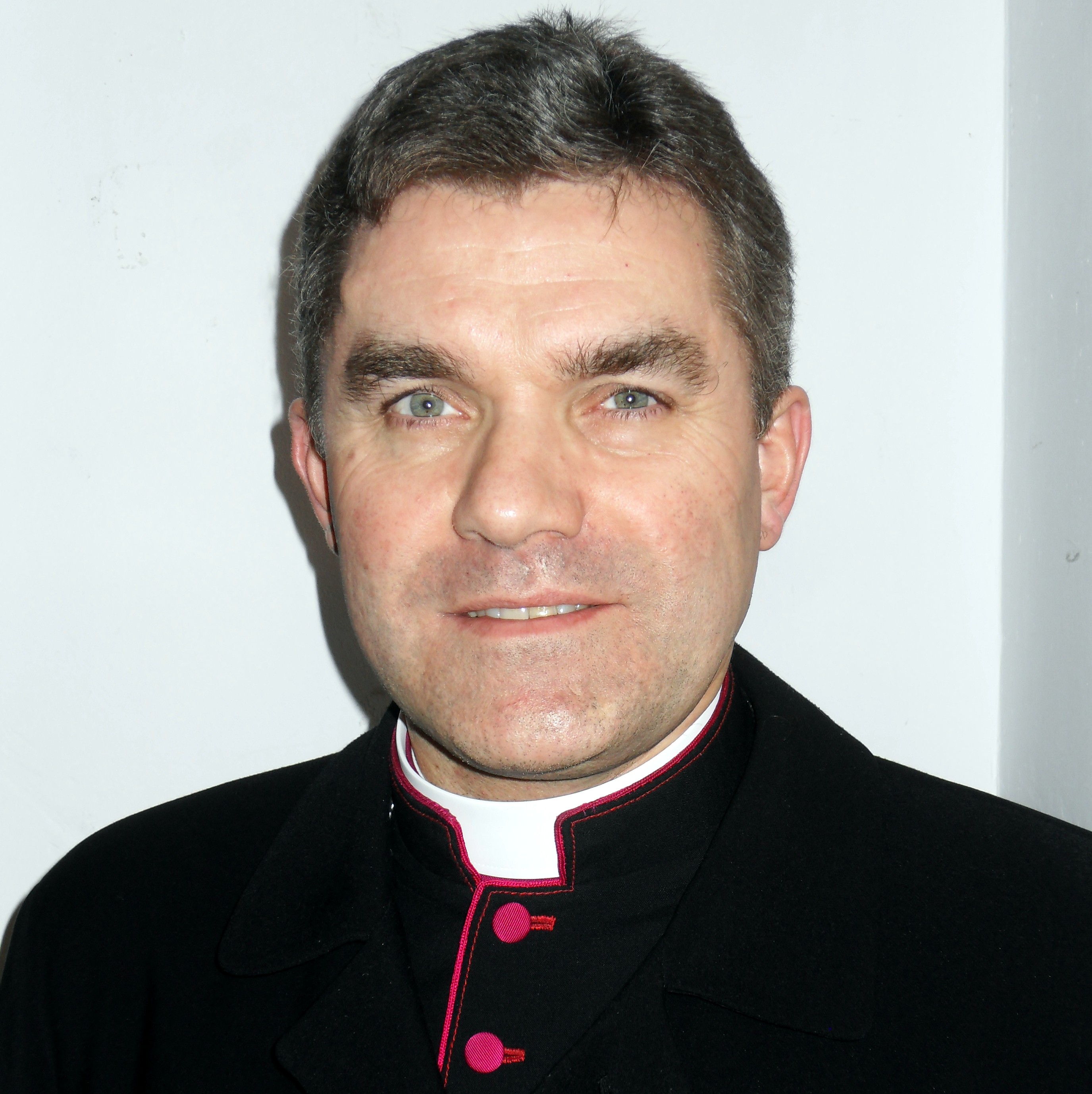
- Zieliński in 2015
- Church: Catholic Church
- Archdiocese: Poznań
- Appointed: 19 March 2025
- Installed: 1 May 2025 (scheduled)
- Predecessor: Stanisław Gądecki
- Previous posts: Auxiliary bishop of the Archdiocese of Gdańsk (2015-2022); Bishop coadjutor of the Diocese of Koszalin-Kołobrzeg (2023-2025); Bishop of the Diocese of Koszalin-Kołobrzeg (2023-2025)

Orders
- Ordination: 18 May 1991 by Tadeusz Gocłowski
- Consecration: 24 October 2015 by Sławoj Leszek Głódź

Personal details
- Born: 14 January 1965 (age 61) Gdańsk, Poland
- Education: Academy of Catholic Theology, Warsaw
- Motto: Ut unum sint
- Coat of arms

Zbigniew Zieliński (born 14 January 1965) is a Polish prelate of the Catholic Church who is metropolitan archbishop of Poznań since 2025. He was bishop of the Diocese of Koszalin-Kołobrzeg from 2023 to 2025, after serving as bishop coadjutor there for a year. He was auxiliary bishop of the Archdiocese of Gdańsk from 2015 to 2022.

== Biography ==
Zbigniew Jan Zieliński was born on 14 January 1965 in Gdańsk to Rupert and Teresa (née Karczewska) Zieliński. He completed high school at the Shipbuilding Technical School "Conradinum" in 1985. He studied at the major seminary of Gdańsk and on 18 May 1991 was ordained a priest of that archdiocese by Archbishop Tadeusz Gocłowski. In 1995 he continued his studies at the Academy of Catholic Theology in Warsaw, now Cardinal Stefan Wyszyński University, earning a doctorate in sociology in 2004 with a thesis on "The transmission of religious values in the reformed Polish public school after 1990".

From 1991 to 1999 he was Vicar in the Parish of B.V.M. Addolorata in Gdańsk and from 1999 to 2000 in the Cathedral of the Most Holy Trinity in the Oliwa section of Gdańsk. From 2000 to 2008 he was director of the Department for Pastoral Care of the archdiocese. He served on the Archdiocesan Pastoral Council and was a member of the Commission of the Third Synod of Gdańsk held in 2001. From 2004 to 2006 he was a professor of the sociology of religion at the University of Gdańsk. From 2004 to 2007 he was pastor of the parish of St. Michael the Archangel in Sopot and from 2007 to 2014 of the Cathedral in Oliwa. In 2014-2015, he was parish priest of the Co-Cathedral of the Assumption of the Blessed Virgin Mary in Gdańsk. He also served as chaplain to several men's groups, including forestry workers and hunters. He was named a canon of the archcathedral in 2005 and provost of the chapter in 2013.

On 26 September 2015 he was appointed titular bishop of Medeli and auxiliary of the archdiocese of Gdańsk. He received his episcopal consecration from Sławoj Leszek Głódź, Archbishop of Gdańsk, with Archbishop Celestino Migliore, Apostolic Nuncio to Poland, and Tadeusz Gocłowski, Archbishop emeritus of Gdańsk as co-consecrators, on 24 October. In the Polish Bishops' Conference, he became member of the Council for Social Affairs in November 2021 and in January 2022 its secretary.

On 10 March 2022, Pope Francis named him bishop coadjutor of the Diocese of Koszalin-Kołobrzeg. He succeeded as bishop upon the retirement of Bishop Edward Dajczak on 2 February 2023.

He was apostolic administrator of the Archdiocese of Szczecin-Kamień from February to October 2024.

On 19 March 2025, Pope Francis named him metropolitan archbishop of Poznań. His installation was hold on 1 May 2025.
