= Archdiocese of Gdańsk =

Roman Catholic archdiocese in Poland

Coordinates: 54°24′40″N 18°33′32″E

Archdiocese of Gdańsk Archidioecesis Gedanensis Archidiecezja Gdańska

Catholic
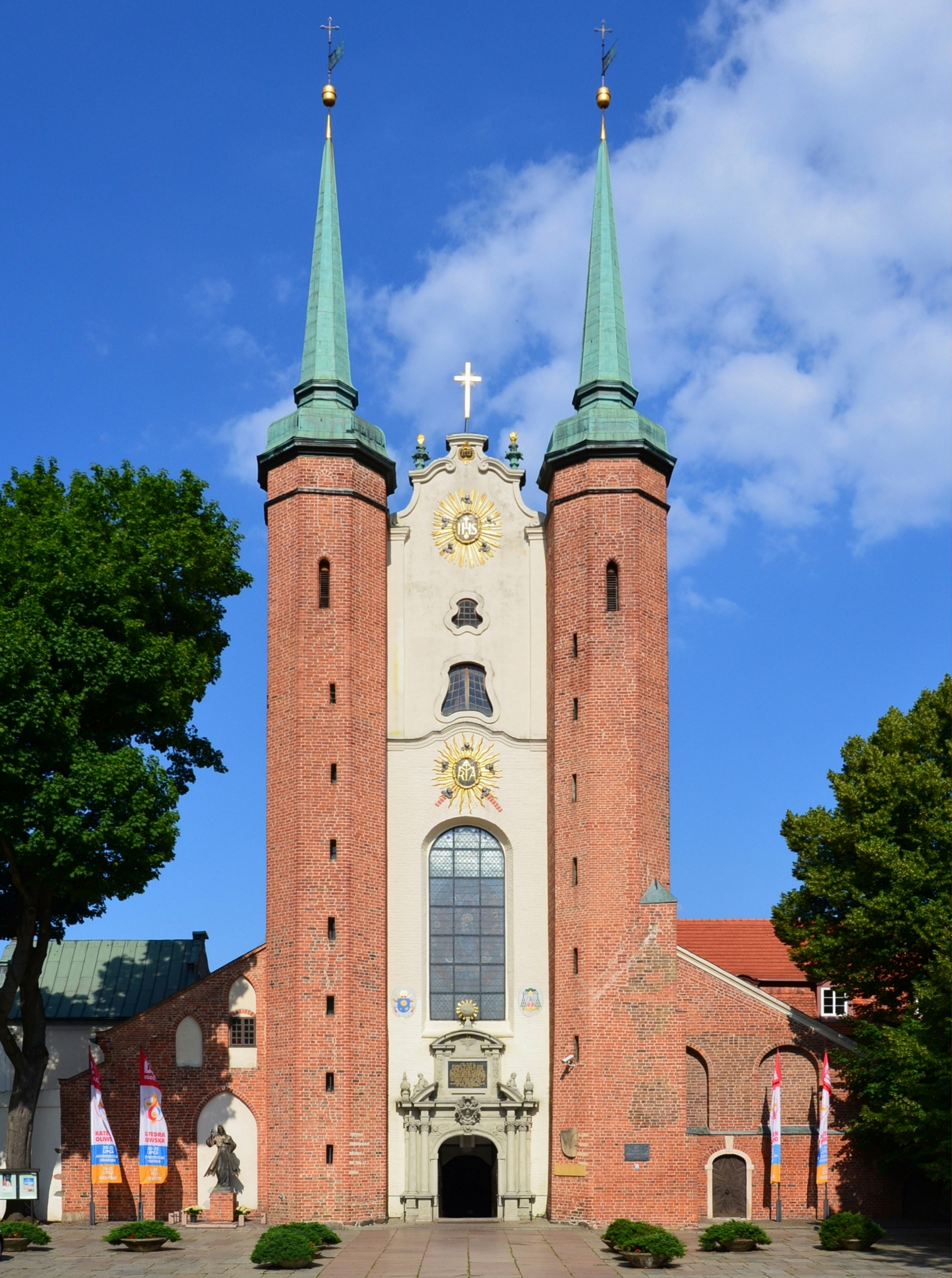
- Archcathedral Basilica of The Holy Trinity, Blessed Virgin Mary and St Bernard in Gdańsk Oliwa

Location
- Country: Poland

Statistics
- Area: 2,500 km^{2} (970 sq mi)
- Population: Total; Catholics: (as of 2021); 1,073,339; 926,220 (86.3%)

Information
- Denomination: Catholic Church
- Sui iuris church: Latin Church
- Rite: Roman Rite
- Cathedral: Archcathedral Basilica of The Holy Trinity, Blessed Virgin Mary and St Bernard in Gdańsk Oliwa
- Co-cathedral: The Co-Cathedral of St Mary

Current leadership
- Pope: Leo XIV
- Archbishop: Tadeusz Wojda S.A.C.
- Auxiliary Bishops: Piotr Przyborek; Wiesław Szlachetka
- Bishops emeritus: Sławoj Leszek Głódź

Map

Website
- Website of the Archdiocese

The Archdiocese of Gdańsk (Latin: Gedanen(sis)) is a Latin Church ecclesiastical jurisdiction or archdiocese of the Catholic Church in Poland. The diocese's episcopal see is Gdańsk.

According to the church statistics Sunday mass attendance was 38.1% in 2013 making it lower than the Polish average of weekly mass attendance (39.1%).

Its Archcathedral Basilica of The Holy Trinity, Blessed Virgin Mary and St Bernard in Gdańsk is listed as a Historic Monument of Poland.

== History ==
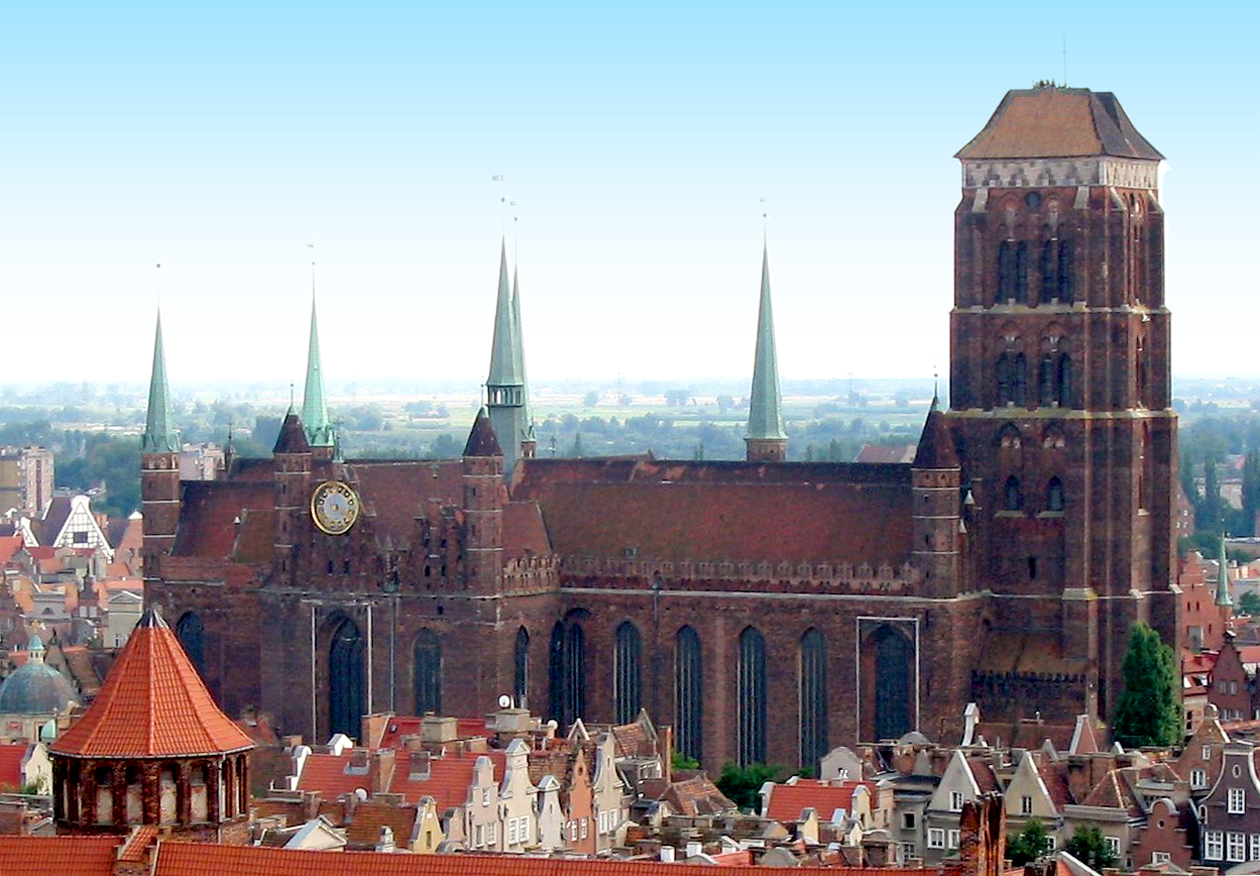
Co-Cathedral Basilica of the Assumption of the Blessed Virgin Mary

After World War I and restoration of independent Poland, the city of Gdańsk (Danzig) was not restored to Poland from Germany, but rather turned into a free city according to the Treaty of Versailles. The Catholic congregation west of the Vistula belonged to the Diocese of Chełmno, which was restored to Poland and east of the Vistula to the Diocese of Warmia, which remained part of Weimar Germany in the interbellum. Germans within the administration of the Diocese of Chełmno were replaced by Polish priests and the Polish language was implemented as binding. While about 130,000 people in Danzig were Catholic, only about 10 percent of them were Polish-speaking and the first attempts to reorganize the ecclesiastical allocation were made in spring 1919, when members of the German congregation asked for an affiliation to the Diocese of Warmia.

While these attempts were supported by the German government, the Polish government tried to preserve the current situation. Pope Pius XI decided to establish an Apostolic Administrator of the Free City of Danzig on 24 April 1922, which was directly subordinated to the Pope. In 1925 a concordat between Poland and the Holy See was signed and the Apostolic Administrator was now supposed to be subordinated to the Nuncio of Warsaw, which caused protests among the local populace. Thus the Pope established the exempt Diocese of Danzig on 30 December 1925 and appointed Edward O'Rourke as the first Bishop on 2 January 1926.

The Diocese was promoted as Metropolitan Archdiocese of Gdańsk on 25 March 1992. On 17 November 1993, the Archbishop issued the instructions on the status of Kashubian as a language of liturgy.

=== Reports of sex abuse ===
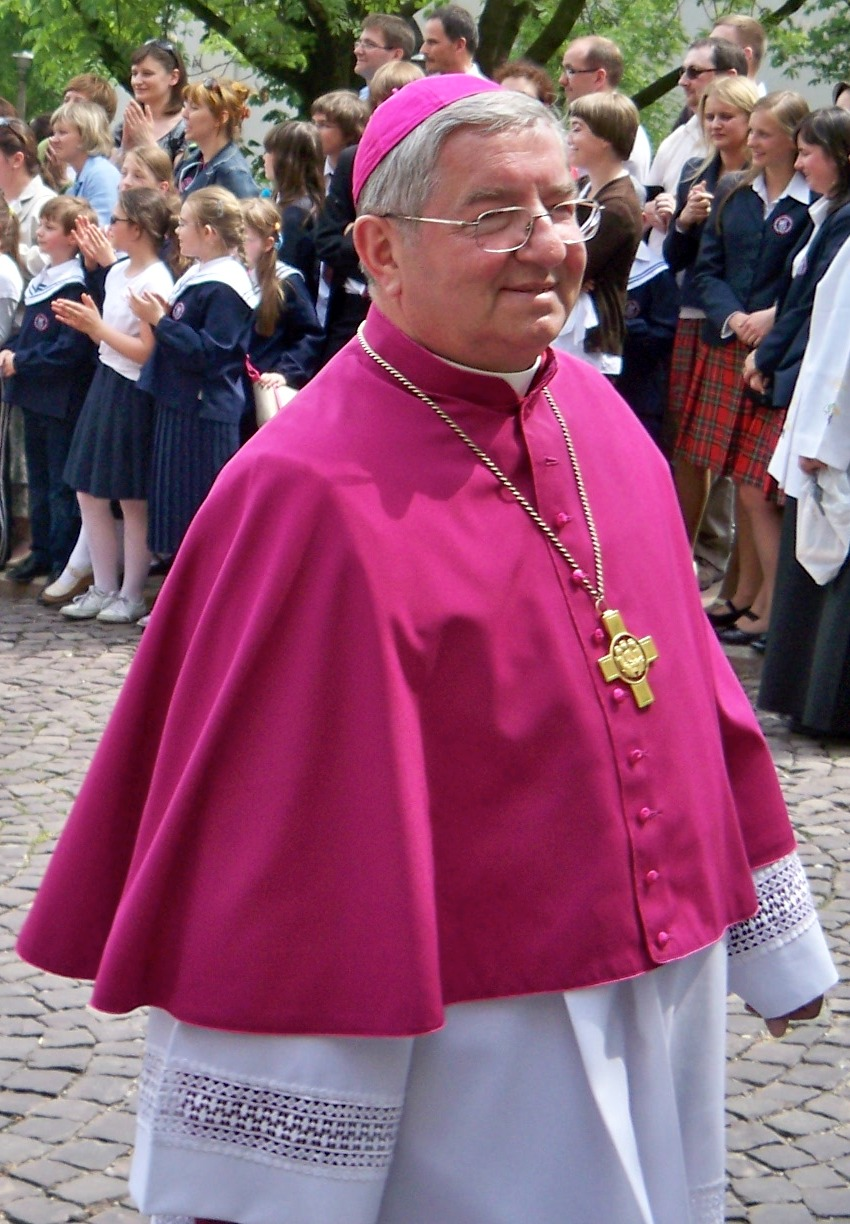
Archbishop Sławoj Leszek Głódź

In 2019, three protestors toppled a statue of Rev. Henryk Jankowski following revelations that he sexually abused Barbara Borowiecka when she was a girl. Jankowski, who also had a criminal investigation involving the sexual abuse of a boy dropped against him in 2004, had been defrocked in 2005. However, he died in 2010 without ever being convicted of sex abuse. It has also been acknowledged that Lech Walsea's personal chaplain Rev. Franciszek Cybula had been accused of committing acts of sex abuse while serving in the as well. On 13 August 2020, Pope Francis removed Gdańsk Archbishop Sławoj Leszek Głódź, who was among those who covered up abuse committed by Jankowski and Cybula. Glodz had also presided over Cybula's funeral. Despite the fact that Glodz had just turned 75, the required age for Catholic Bishops to offer their resignation, the move was described as "cleaning house," as it is highly unusual for the Pope to accept such a resignation on a prelate's actual birthday.

== Special churches ==
- Cathedral, Minor Basilica:
  - Cathedral Basilica of The Holy Trinity
- Co-Cathedral, Minor Basilica:
  - Co-Cathedral Basilica of the Assumption of the Blessed Virgin Mary
- Minor Basilicas:
  - St. Nicholas' Basilica, Gdańsk
  - St. Brigid Basilica, Gdańsk

== Leadership ==
Diocesan bishops

- 1926–1938 - Edward O'Rourke (2 June 1926 – 13 June 1938)
  - Apostolic Administrator of the Free City of Danzig, 1922–1926
- Carl Maria Splett (Karol Maria Splett) (13 June 1938 – 5 March 1964)
  - arrested by the Polish communist government in 1945 and imprisoned; emigrated to Germany in 1956
- 1945–1951 - Andrzej Wronka, apostolic administrator
- 1951–1956 - Jan Cymanowski, vicar
- Edmund Nowicki (7 March 1964– 10 March 1971)
  - coadjutor bishop, 1951–1964
- Lech Kaczmarek (1 December 1971– 31 July 1984)
- Tadeusz Gocłowski (31 December 1984 – 25 March 1992)

Metropolitan bishops

- Tadeusz Gocłowski (25 March 1992 – 17 April 2008)
- Sławoj Leszek Głódź (17 April 2008 – 13 August 2020)
- Tadeusz Wojda (2 March 2021 – present)

Auxiliary bishops

- 1958–1971 – Lech Kaczmarek
- 1972–1982 – Kazimierz Kluz
- 1983–1984 – Tadeusz Gocłowski
- 1985–2005 – Zygmunt Pawłowicz (retired in 2005)
- 2005–2012 – Ryszard Kasyna
- since 2014 – Wiesław Szlachetka
- 2015–2022 – Zbigniew Zieliński
- since 2022 – Piotr Przyborek

== Suffragan dioceses ==
- Pelplin
- Toruń

== See also ==
- Roman Catholicism in Poland
