= Zygmunt Pawłowicz =

Polish Roman Catholic bishop

Zygmunt Józef Pawłowicz (November 18, 1927 – March 18, 2010) was the Polish Auxiliary bishop of the Roman Catholic Archdiocese of Gdańsk from 1985 until 2005. He was also ordained the titular bishop of Tamallula in 1985.

Born in the Free City of Danzig, Pawłowicz was ordained a Catholic priest on September 20, 1952. He died on March 18, 2010, at the age of 82.
