= Basilica of St. Nicholas, Gdańsk =

Church in Gdańsk, Poland

Coordinates: 54°21′07.92″N 18°39′09.26″E

Basilica of Saint Nicholas
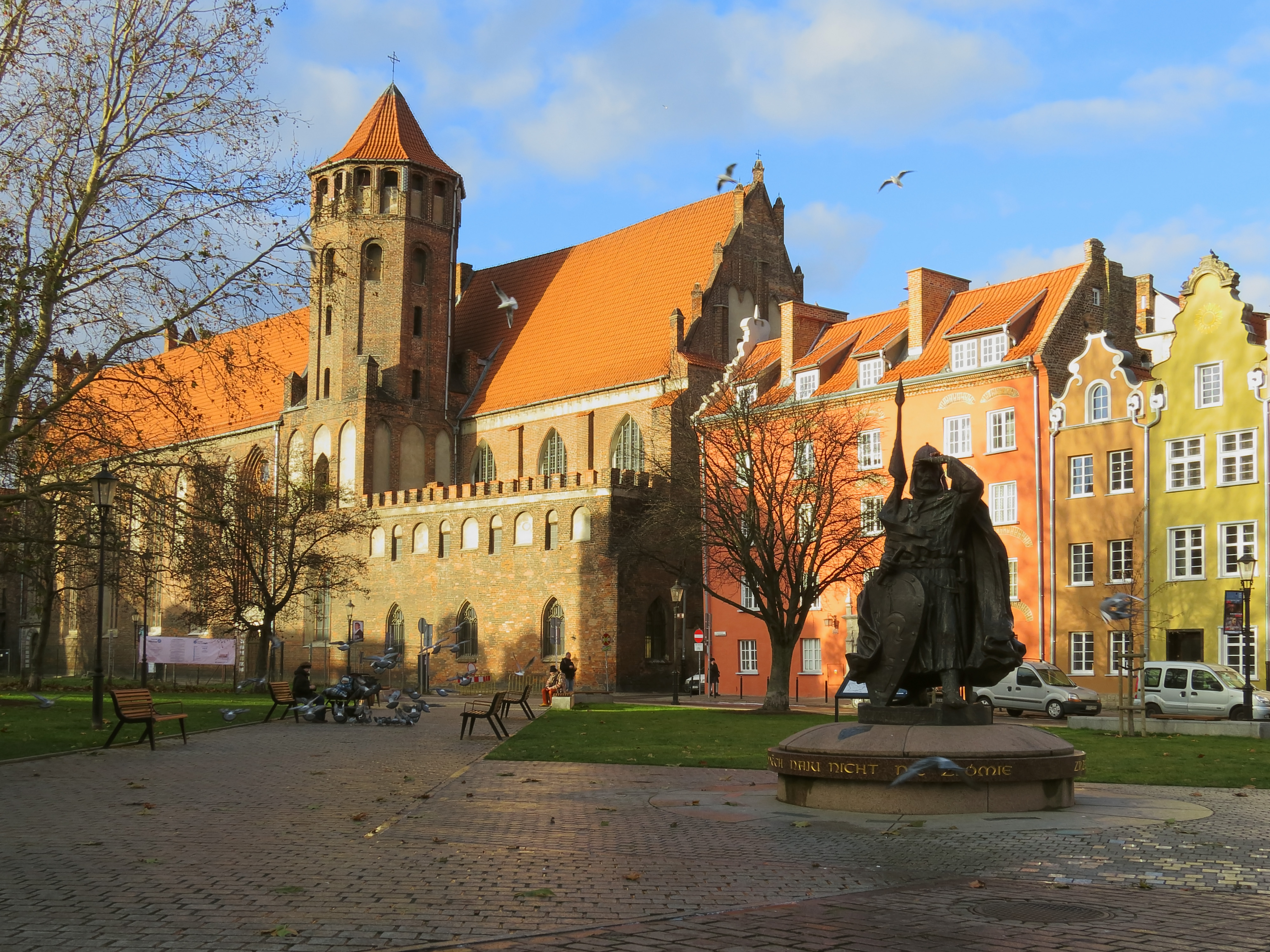
- The church before renovation, 2018
- Basilica of Saint Nicholas
- Address: Świętojańska 72, Śródmieście, Gdańsk
- Country: Poland
- Denomination: Roman Catholic
- Website: Official website

History
- Status: Minor basilica

Architecture
- Functional status: active
- Architectural type: Hall church
- Style: Brick Gothic
- Years built: c. 1348–1487

Specifications
- Length: 63 m (206 ft 8 in)
- Width: 22.24 m (73 ft 0 in)
- Materials: Brick

Administration
- Archdiocese: Gdańsk

Basilica of Saint Nicholas (Polish: Bazylika św. Mikołaja; German: Nikolaikirche) is a Brick Gothic church situated in the Old Town of Gdańsk, Poland. Constructed between the 14th and 15th centuries, the basilica currently serves the Dominican Order. It remains the only historic church of central Gdańsk which escaped damage during World War II.

== History ==
The present site was first occupied by a small place of worship or church in the Romanesque style, constructed in approximately 1185–90. It was situated on the via mercatorum trade route, which allowed the early church to be attended by foreign merchants and sailors arriving in the city.

On 22 January 1227, Świętopełk II, Duke of Pomerania, entrusted the church to the Dominican friars, who were invited to the region by Saint Hyacinth of Poland. It was consecrated by the papal legate William of Modena in 1239.

In 1260, Pope Alexander IV granted the Dominicans the right to organise an annual church kermesse (festival) on 4 August. It soon transformed into what is now the St. Dominic's Fair, a cultural and trade event held between July and August by the city authorities.

The current Brick Gothic structure was largely erected after 1348, beginning with the presbytery (chancel). The entirety was completed in around 1487 with the ceiling and roofing. The southern tower was also enlarged and elevated by the octagonal addition during this time.

Following the rise of Protestantism under the Reformation, the Dominican church and adjacent abbey were repeatedly plundered, with the friars evicted by force. In 1564, the city council transferred the church to Protestant ownership and moved the church's treasury to the Town Hall. However, Sigismund II Augustus, King of Poland, repudiated the idea and intervened on behalf of the Catholic worshippers; the church reverted to the Dominican Order in 1567.

Upon arriving from Sweden, Sigismund III Vasa was handed an official document confirming his election to the Polish throne inside this church on 11 September 1587.

In 1813, during the Napoleonic Wars, the neighbouring Dominican convent was destroyed by fire and its debris cleared; the Dominican monks eventually left the city by 1834. Nonetheless, it remained in the hands of the Catholic Church. In 1929, it became a minor basilica by the decision of Pope Pius XI, who gifted the parish a large umbraculum. Considered lost for decades, it was found in 2019 during renovation works.

The building remained unscathed throughout World War II, especially during the Red Army's shelling of Danzig. In April 1945, the Dominicans were repatriated from Lviv and returned to the church.

In the post-war period, under the Polish People's Republic, the church became a gathering point for the anti-communist opposition and Solidarity members.

In October 2018, large cracks appeared on the vaulted ceiling and the main supporting pillars became unstable. Thus, the church was closed almost immediately due to the danger of collapsing. The emergency repairs along with works on foundations and vaulting were completed by 2022, though the church's structural integrity is to be continuously monitored.

== Architecture ==
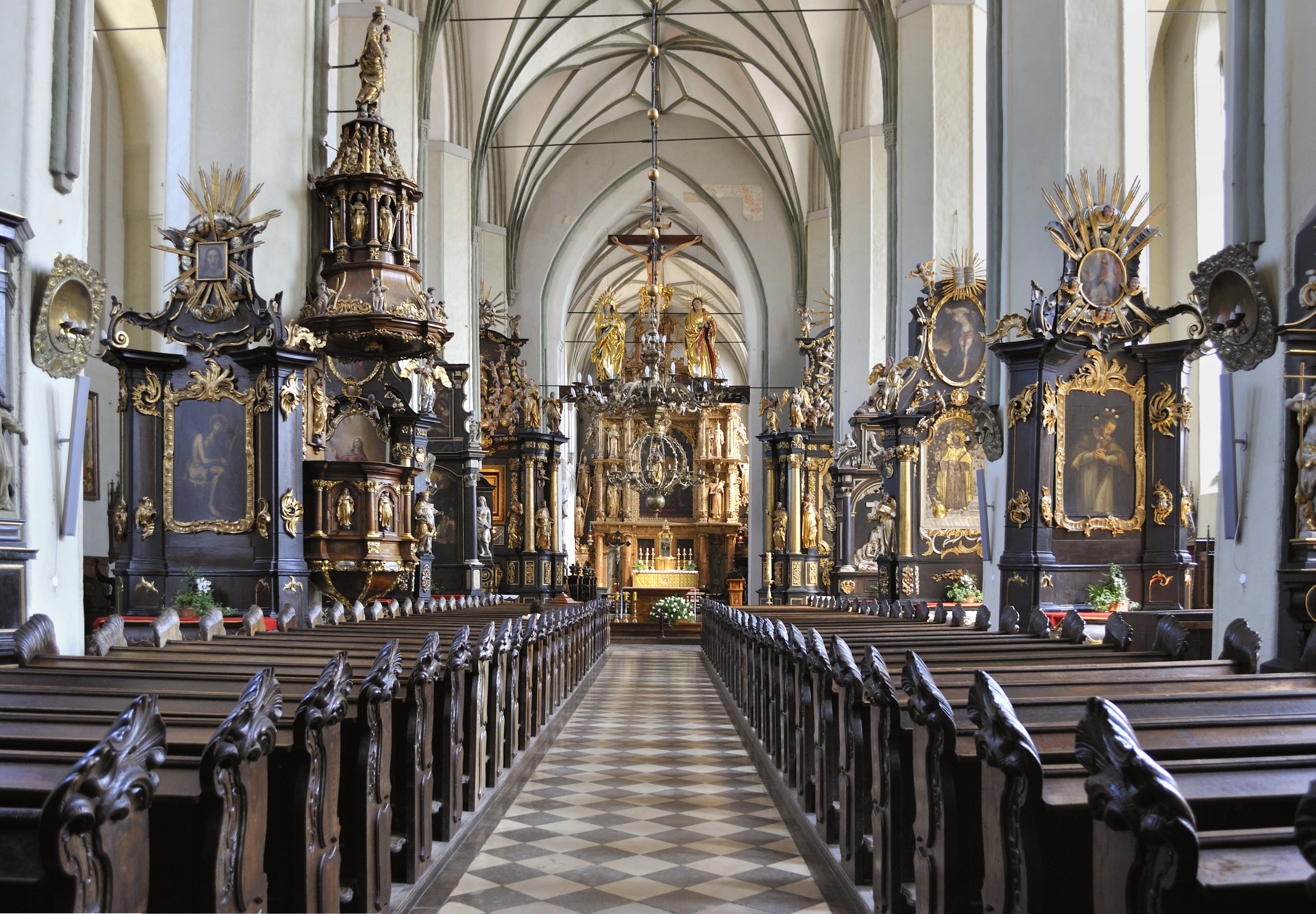
The interior with original furnishings

As with the other historic places of worship in Gdańsk, the basilica is a long hall church made of red brick with its exterior more reminiscent of defensive castles or fortresses – a style common within the Hanseatic League. The total length is estimated at 63 metres (207 ft) and the width at 22.24 metres (73.0 ft). It possesses a three nave system with hidden buttresses. The entire structure is supported from the inside by ten octagonal pillars. The ceiling comprises a lierne vault with a star design. The floor is made of limestone brought from the Swedish island of Öland and features animal fossils. The cellars currently hold a crypt which is open to visitors.

Having escaped destruction, the interior of the church is adorned by original furnishings from the Gothic, Renaissance, Baroque and Rococo periods. Notably, it holds a 15th-century Pietà, wall frescos from 1430s, carved choir-stalls and altars. The walls are embellished by ornamental epitaphs of Polish and German-speaking citizens or merchants. There is also a ledger stone of a Teutonic knight from Thuringia.

== See also ==
- St. Mary's Church, Gdańsk – one of the world's largest brick churches.
- St. Catherine's Church, Gdańsk – the city's oldest active church.

== Bibliography ==
=== Sources ===
- Adamkowicz, Marek (2012). "Malbork, Gdańsk: Zaginione groby Krzyżaków. Gdzie ich szukać?". dziennikbaltycki.pl (in Polish). Gdańsk: Polska Press.
- Friedrich, Jacek (1995). Gdańskie zabytki architektury do końca XVIII wieku (in Polish). Gdańsk: Wydawn. Uniwersytetu Gdańskiego. ISBN 9788370176068.
- Gliński, Mirosław; Kukliński, Jerzy (1998). Kronika Gdańska: 997-1945 (in Polish). Gdańsk: Fundacja Rewaloryzacji Zabytków Gdańska. ISBN 9788390237565.
- Gołembnik, Andrzej (2002). Dominikańskie Centrum św. Jacka w Gdańsku (in Polish). Vol. 2. Warszawa (Warsaw): Instytut Archeologii UW. ISBN 9788387496159.
- Gołembnik, Andrzej; Dekański, Dariusz Aleksander; Grubka, Marek (2003). Dominikanie: Gdańsk-Polska-Europa (in Polish). Gdańsk: Wydawn. Diecezji Pelplińskiej "Bernardinum". ISBN 9788391748107.
- Gdańskie Towarzystwo Naukowe (1964). Gdańsk wczesnośredniowieczny (in Polish). Vol. 5. Gdańsk: Wydział I Nauk Społecznych i Humanistycznych. OCLC 1412079353.
- Iluk, Jan; Mariańska, Danuta (1997). Protestantyzm i protestanci na Pomorzu (in Polish). Gdańsk: Instytut Historii, Uniwersytet Gdański. ISBN 9788386670765.
- Januszajtis, Andrzej (1968). Z uśmiechem przez Gdańsk (in Polish). Gdynia: Wydawn. Morskie. OCLC 250907544.
- Katarzyńska, Alicja (2019). "Bazylika św. Mikołaja. Georadar wykrył powietrze pod zabytkową posadzką". gdansk.pl (in Polish). Gdańsk: Gdańskie Centrum Multimedialne.
- Krzyżanowski, Lech (1970). Gdańsk, Sopot, Gdynia. Przewodnik (in Polish). Warszawa (Warsaw): Sport i Turysyka. OCLC 69447171.
- L.T. (2015). "Kościół św. Mikołaja w Gdańsku. II Architektura" (PDF). przewodnikgdanski.pl (in Polish). Gdańsk.
- Marie Skłodowska-Curie University (1989). Annales Universitatis. Medicina. Sectio D (in Polish). Vol. 43–45. Lublin: UMSC.
- Redakcja (2018). "Jedyny w Śródmieściu, który przetrwał II wojnę. Historia św. Mikołaja". gdansk.pl (in Polish). Gdańsk: Gdańskie Centrum Multimedialne.
- Redakcja (2024). "Bazylika". gdansk.dominikanie.pl (in Polish). Gdańsk: Klasztor OO. Dominikanów w Gdańsku; Parafia św. Mikołaja.
- Tokarczyk, Michał (2019). "Sensacyjne odkrycie w gdańskim kościele. Dominikanie znaleźli papieski parasol". trojmiasto.wyborcza.pl (in Polish). Gdańsk: Gazeta Wyborcza.
- Wałuszko, Marek (2022). "Bazylika św. Mikołaja. Wszystkie sklepienia w nawie południowej zostały właśnie naprawione". gdansk.pl (in Polish). Gdańsk: Gdańskie Centrum Multimedialne.
