= Oliwa Cathedral =

Coordinates: 54°24′39.65″N 18°33′32.08″E

- Archcathedral Basilica of the Holy Trinity in Oliwa, Gdańsk
- Bazylika archikatedralna Trójcy Świętej w Gdańsku-Oliwie
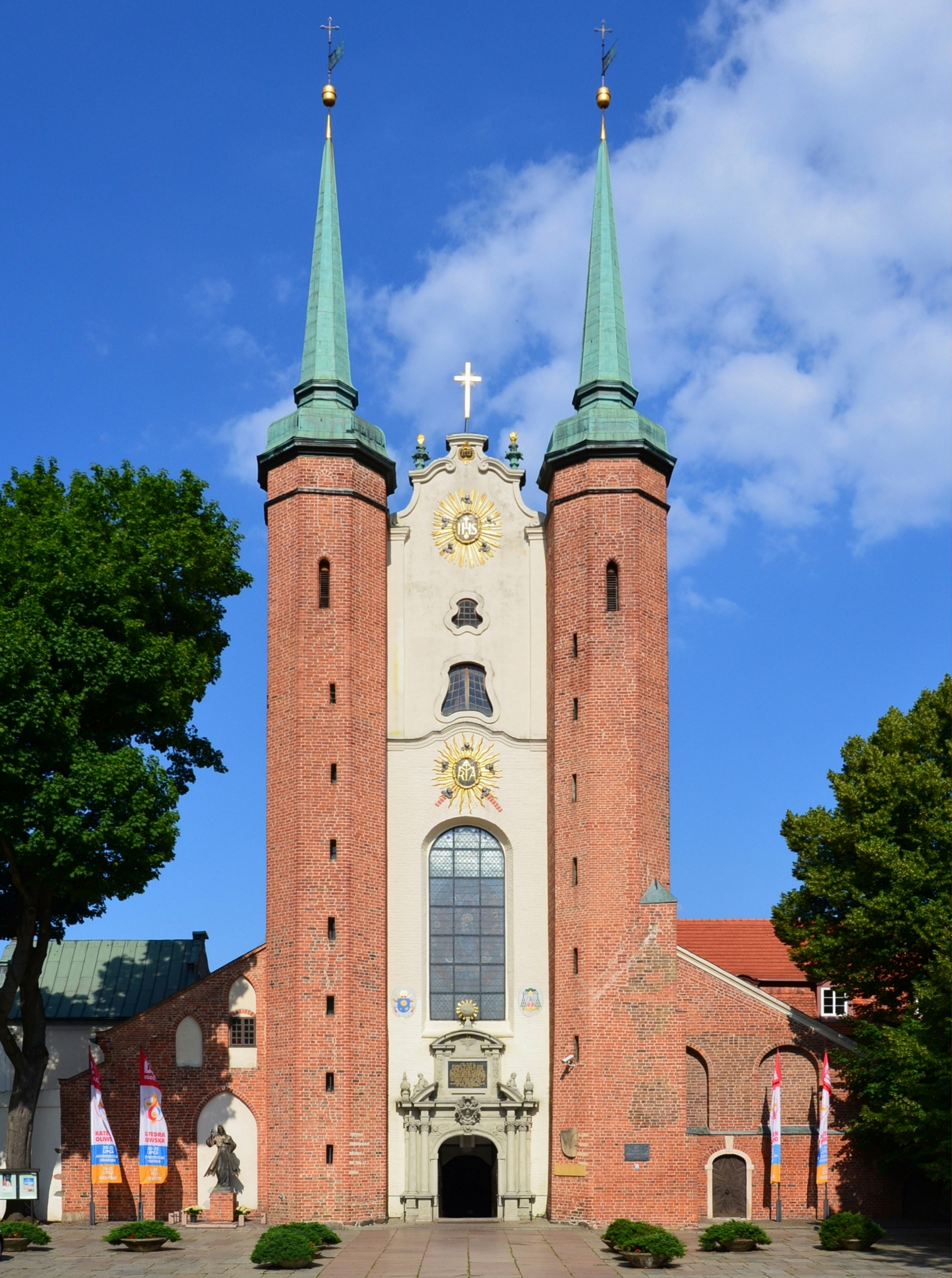
- Oliwa Cathedral
- Location: Oliwa, Gdańsk
- Country: Poland
- Denomination: Catholic
- Website: https://www.archikatedraoliwa.pl

History
- Status: Minor basilica, archcathedral
- Dedication: The Holy Trinity
- Dedicated: 14 August 1594

Architecture
- Functional status: Active
- Heritage designation: Protected cultural property
- Designated: 23 November 2017
- Architectural type: Basilica
- Style: Gothic, Brick Gothic, Mannerist, Baroque
- Groundbreaking: 12th century
- Completed: Second half of the 14th century

Specifications
- Length: 107m
- Width: 19m
- Materials: Brick

Historic Monument of Poland
- Designated: 2017-11-22
- Reference no.: Dz. U. z 2017 poz. 2277

Oliwa Cathedral, formally known as the Archcathedral Basilica of the Holy Trinity, is a Roman Catholic church in the district of Oliwa, in Gdańsk, Poland. Completed in the late 14th century in a Brick Gothic style, the present church comprises Mannerist-Baroque architectural elements. It has been one of Poland's protected Historical Monuments since 2017, due to its historical significance and the great organ inside.

== Cathedral ==
The archcathedral in Oliwa is a three-nave basilica with a transept and a multisided closed presbytery, finished with an ambulatory. The façade is flanked by two slender towers, 46-metres tall each with sharply-edged helmets. It is enlivened by a Baroque portal from 1688, as well as three windows of different sizes and three cartouches. The crossing of the naves is overlooked by a bell tower, a typical element of the Cistercian architecture. The cathedral is 17.7m high, 19m wide and 107m long (97.6m of the interior itself), which makes it the longest Cistercian church in the world. It holds works of art in Renaissance, Baroque, Rococo and Classical style of great artistic value.

=== Historical outline ===
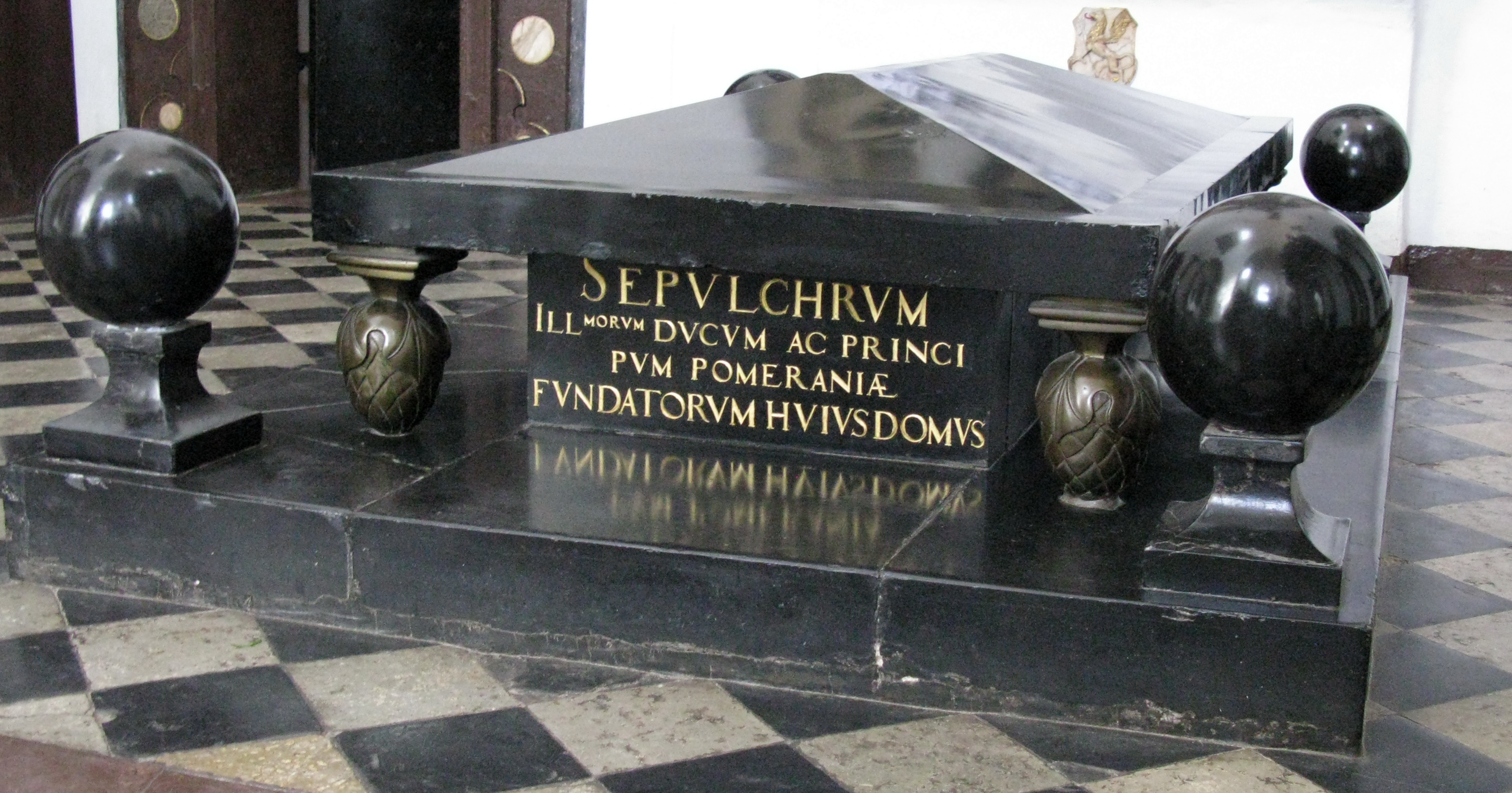
Tomb of Pomeranian Dukes in the Oliwa Archcathedral

- 1186 – 2 July, Sambor I of Gdańsk (son of Subisław I), Duke of Pomerania, founded the Cistercian monastery named "Beatae Mariae de Oliva" or "ad montem Olivarum", and from 12th century "Monasterium sanctae dei genitricis et virginis Mariae de Oliva".
- 1224 – during the pagan Prussians crusade the first Romanesque oratory was burnt. The church was rebuilt and extended in 1234 (or 1236) soon to be destroyed by another Prussian crusade.
- 1350 – fire that was caused by chimney soot excess completely consumed both the church and the monastery. The present shape of both of those buildings date back to the second half of the 14th century.
- 1577 – during the rebellion of the city of Gdańsk the Gdańsk mercenary army attacked the monastery and burned it to the ground. The church was rebuilt between 1578 and 1583.
- 1594 – 14 August, Hieronim Rozdrażewski, a bishop from Włocławek consecrated the church
- 1831 – Prussian authorities closed down the Cistercian monastery in Oliwa. The church, together with some of the buildings belonging to it, was handed over to a Catholic parish of the Diocese of Chelmno (until 1821 Oliwa monastery was a Territorial Abbey).
- 1925 – under a papal bull issued on 30 December, Pope Pius XI established the Diocese of Gdańsk and by that raised the Oliwa church to the dignity of a cathedral. Oliwa became the capital of the diocese and a seat of bishops.
- 1976 – 8 July, the church was raised to the dignity of a minor basilica by the decision of Pope Paul VI.
- 1992 – 25 March, Pope John Paul II issued a bull by which he established the Archdiocese of Gdańsk with the seat in Oliwa and raised the basilica to the dignity of an archcathedral.

=== Interior design ===
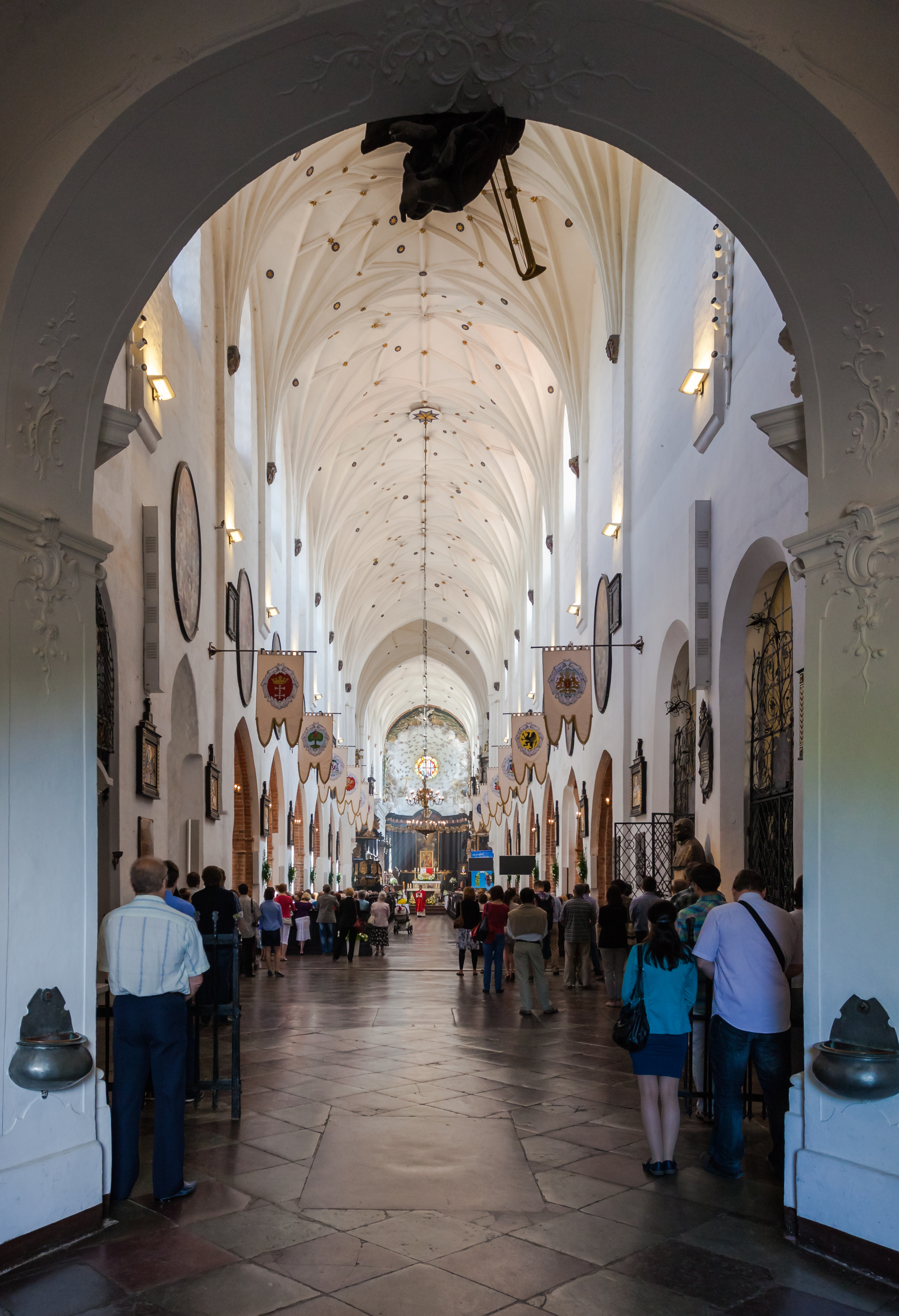
Main nave

All 23 altars of the cathedral are of great historical value. They are mainly Baroque and Rococo, partly made of marble. Their iconography depicts the main principles of the post-Trent church. Most outstanding is the present High Altar (1688), which is the most profound Baroque work of art in Pomerania; and the Netherland Renaissance style altar, which until 1688 played the role of the main one. The paintings in the altars, presbytery and main nave were made by the famous 17th- century artists: Herman Han (1574–1628), Adolf Boy (1612-1680), Andrzej Stech (1635–1697) and Andreas Schlütera (1660–1714). The interior also holds Rococo chapels of the Holy Cross and St John of Nepomuk, an ambo, tombstones, epitaphs, the Pomeranian Dukes tomb, the Kos family tomb, bishop's crypt, antique chandeliers, canopies, and many other antiquities, including a feretory of great cultural value, showing Our Lady of Oliwa with an Infant Jesus. The feretory is always carried during the annual walking pilgrimage to the Calvary of Wejherowo. The archcathedral holds organ concerts all year round and the beautifully restored monastery (now belonging to Gdańsk Seminary) displays the collection of the Diocesan Museum. Oliwa Cathedral is a very important place for the Kashubian culture.

== Oliwa organ ==
=== Great organ ===
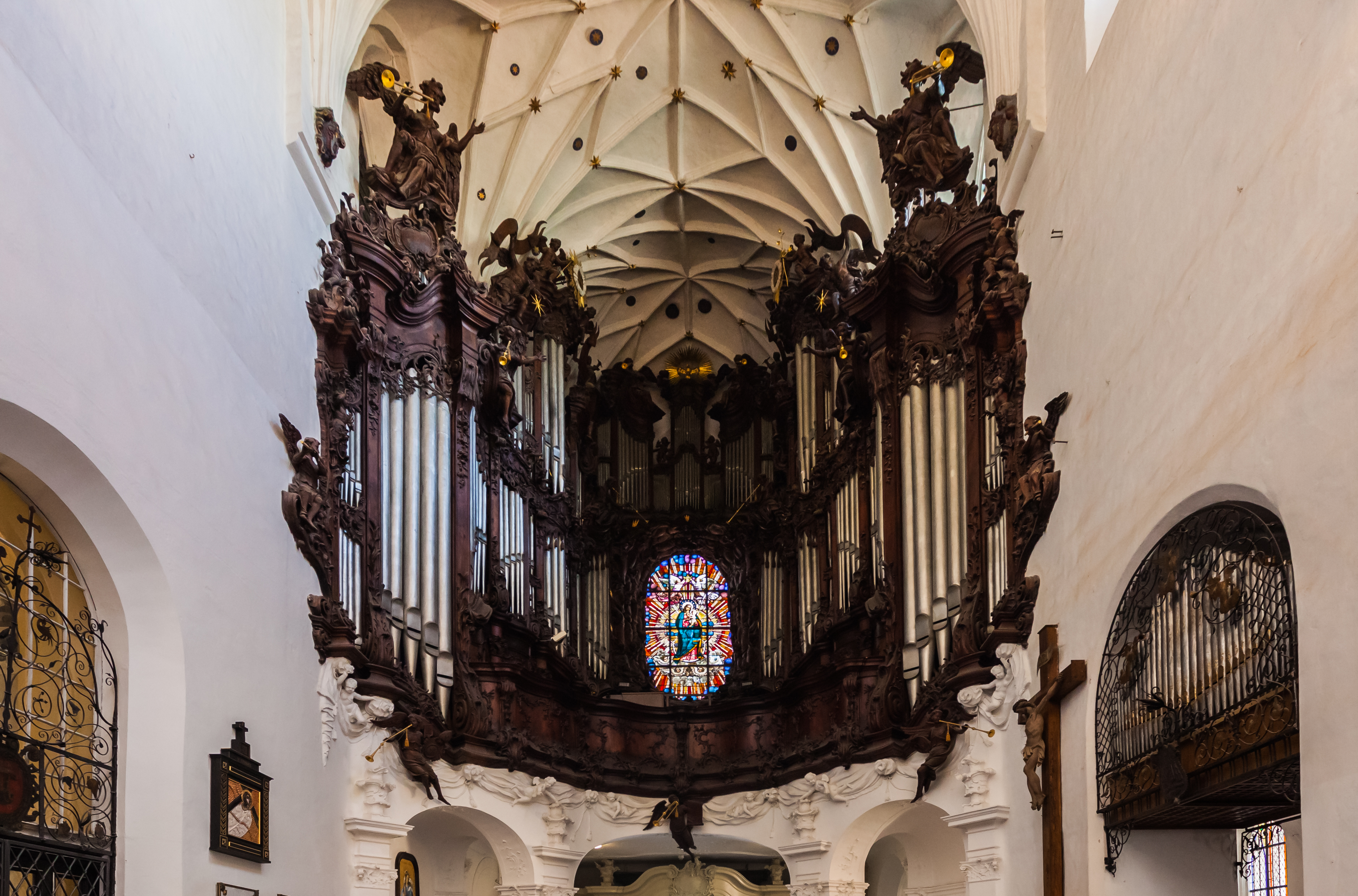
Great organ

- 1763–1788 : Johann Wilhelm Wulff (Orneta)
- 1790–1793 : Friedrich Rudolf Dalitz (Gdańsk)
- 1863–1865 : Friedrich Kaltschmidt (Szczecin)
- 1934–1935 : Joseph Goebel (Gdańsk)
- 1955 : Wacław Biernacki (Kraków)
- 1966– 1968 : Zygmunt Kamiński (Warsaw)

==== 18th and 19th century ====
The famous great Oliwa organ was designed and constructed between 1763 and 1788 by Johann Wilhelm Wulff (Brother Michael, a Cistercian Monk). The instrument contained 83 registers (5100 pipes), 3 manual keyboards (also manuals; Hauptwerk– great organ, Oberwerk– main organ, Kronwerk– crown organ), one foot keyboard (pedal), mechanical tracker action, and 14 wedge-shaped bellows. The console was independently located in the central part of the matroneum, which was unusual in Northern Europe at that time. The organ front was decorated with Rococo sculptures and moveable angels holding bells, trumpets, stars and suns. At that time it was the largest organ in Europe and probably also in the whole world.

Between 1790 and 1793, by order of the new Abbot of Oliwa, a widely known Gdańsk organ master, Friedrich Rudolf Dalitz, undertook the difficult task of moving the console from the middle to the north wing of the matroneum, which was extremely complicated owing to the size of the instrument and the complexity of the tracker action system.

During the next major reconstruction (1863–1865), the great organ was given a Romantic layer. The work was carried out by an organ master from Szczecin- Friedric Kaltschmidt. Wulff's organ was enriched by a mechanical tracker action and 32 new registers. He left the 52 already existing ones, some of which were renewed, and all the front pipes. In accordance with the trend of the time, manual three (Kronwerk) was by Kaltschmidt enclosed into a swell box. The instrument now consisted of 84 registers assigned to 3 manuals and one pedal.

==== 20th and 21st century ====
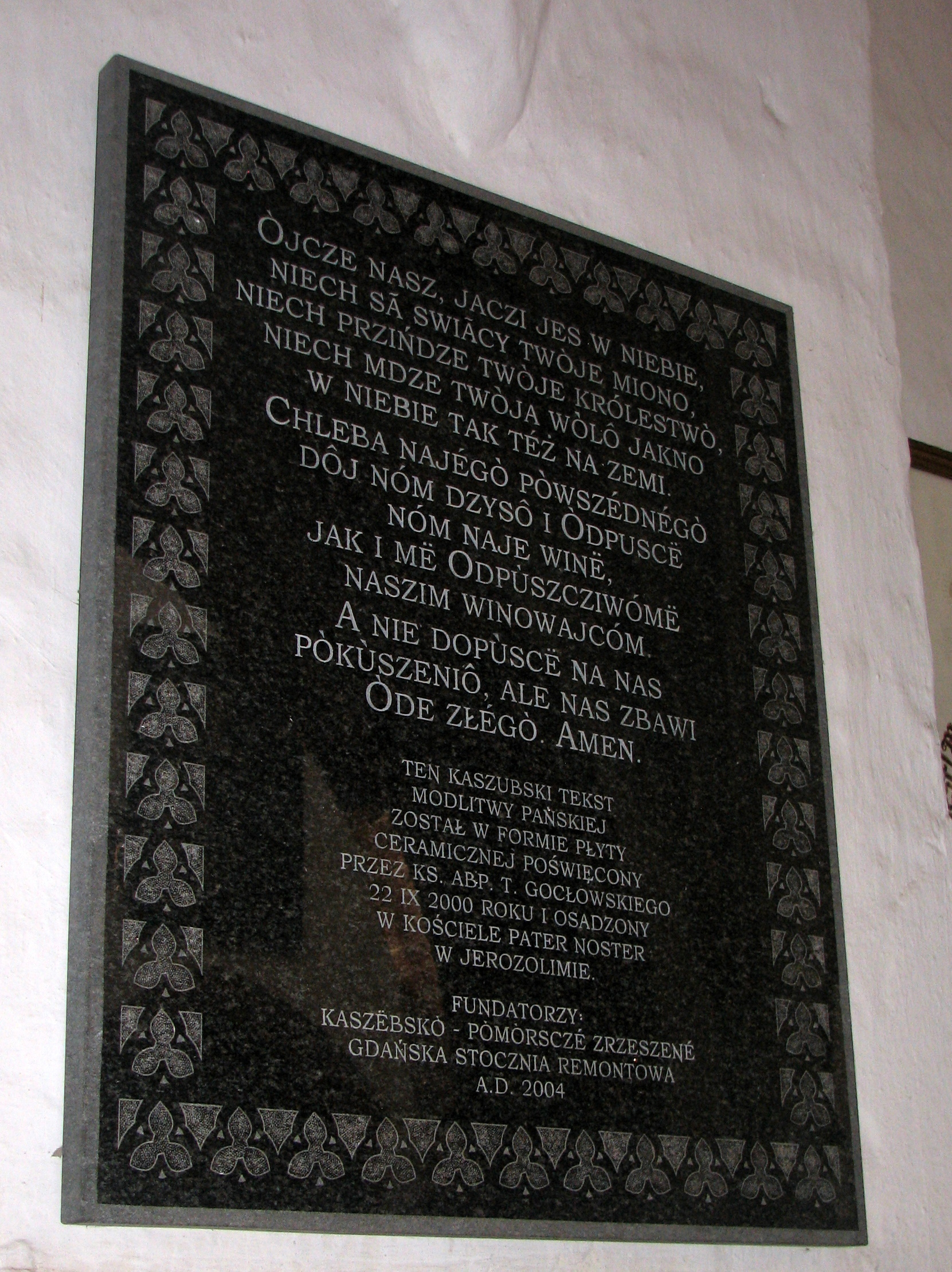
Plaque with Lord's Prayer in the Kashubian language

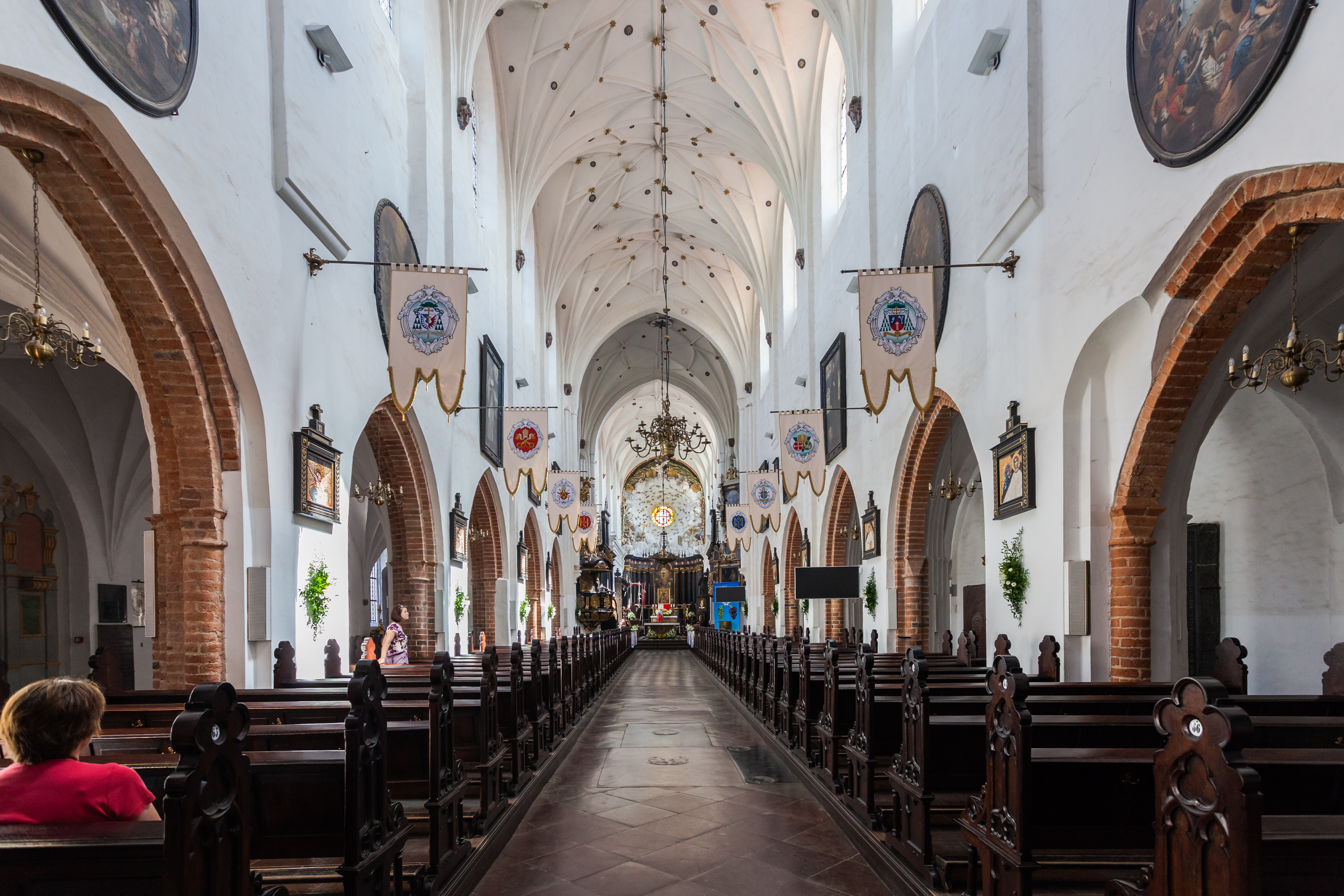
Another view of the interior

Most significant changes in the structure of the instrument were made during the interwar period. Between 1934 and 1935, Gdańsk organ builder, Joseph Goebel extended the organ to 4 manuals and added a new electro-pneumatic tracker action with wind chests. He used 51 registers from those already existing, renewing some of them and adding some new ones. He also connected the choir organ to the main console. After completion of the work, the Oliwa organ had 82 standard registers and 5 transmitted ones.

After World War II, in 1955, the organ was thoroughly renovated by Wacław Biernacki from Kraków. The last overhaul of the instrument was in 1966–1968, by the company of Zygmund Kamiński from Warsaw. He introduced a new disposition, added several missing pipes and a newly built positive, placed in the third arc in the west of the nave. Today the great Oliwa organ comprises 96 registers, 5 manuals, a pedal, an electro-pneumatic tracker action and also an electronic system recording up to 64 combinations (so-called Setzer type). All the present front pipes are still those made by Johann Wilhelm Wulff. The great organ is connected with the choir organ and is one of the biggest ones in Poland.

The post of the principal organist at the Oliwa Cathedral is currently held by professor Roman Perucki.

==== Demonstration concerto ====
There is a twenty-minute concerto organized daily except for the principal feasts and a few other days as specified in the concerto schedule. Visitors have to be in the cathedral before the hour given as the door may be closed during the concerto. Christian visitors usually say Our Father before they listen to the music.

=== Choir organ ===
The choir organ, placed in the south wing of the transept, was built in 1680 by Johann Georg Wulff and comprised 14 registers. In 1758 Johann Wilhelm Wulff conducted a thorough renovation of the organ, extending the disposition of the organ to 18 registers. In 1874, Carl Schuricht performed the organ restoration. In 1902 Berlin-based company of brothers Oswald and Paul Dinse carried out further reconstruction of the organ, introducing a pneumatic tracker action and reducing the number of registers to 14 (2 manuals and a pedal). When, in 1934–1935, Joseph Goebel was restoring the great organ, he also took care of the choir organ. It received a new electric tracker action and was connected to the main console. In 2003, a contemporary Emanuel Kemper 17-pipe organ with a mechanical and electric tracker action was imported from Germany. Afterwards, an organ builder Jerzy Kukla installed it in an antique organ case, replacing the previous instrument. The choir organ is at present connected with the great organ.
