= Kociewie =

Ethnocultural region in Poland

- Ethnocultural region
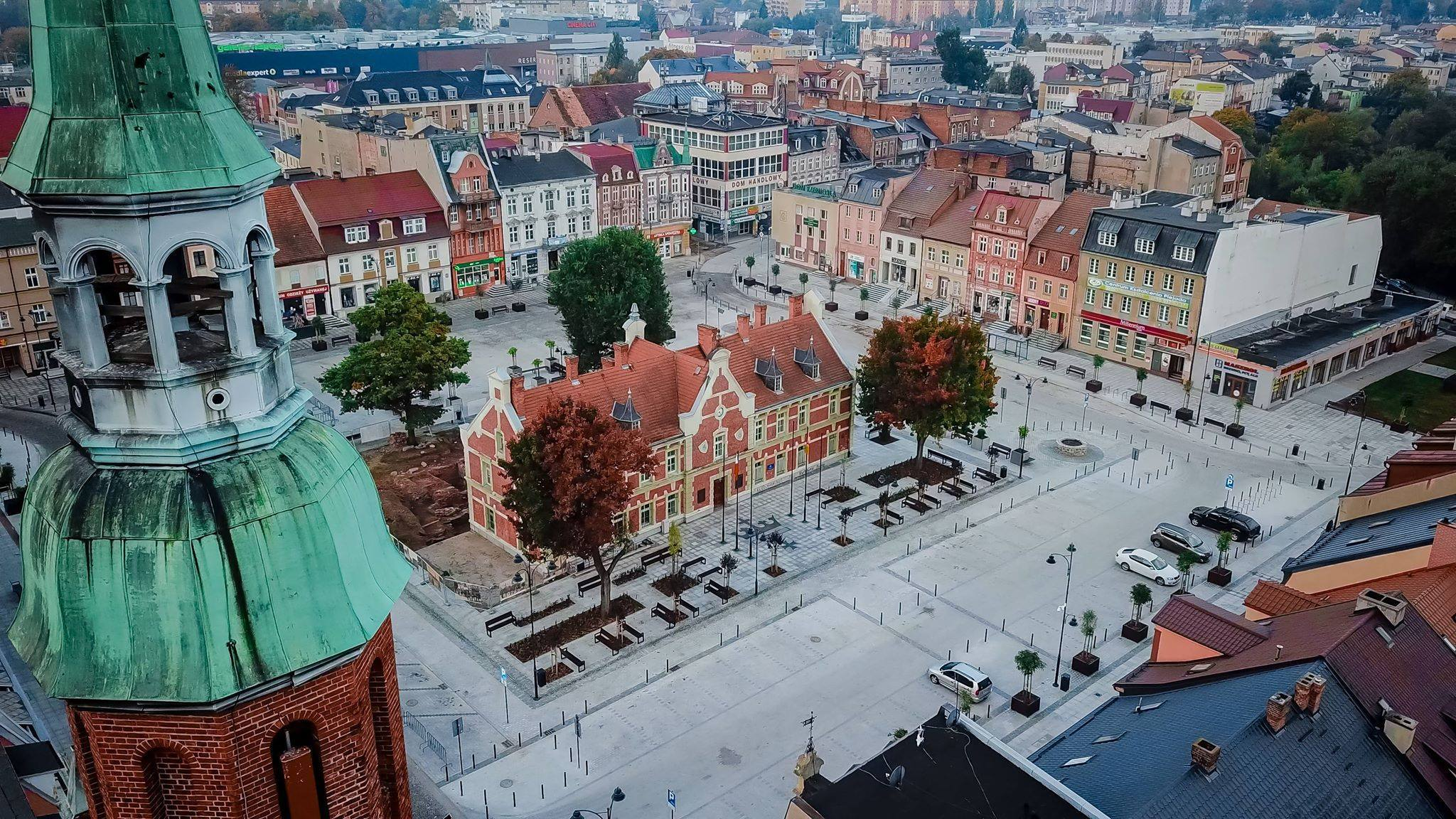
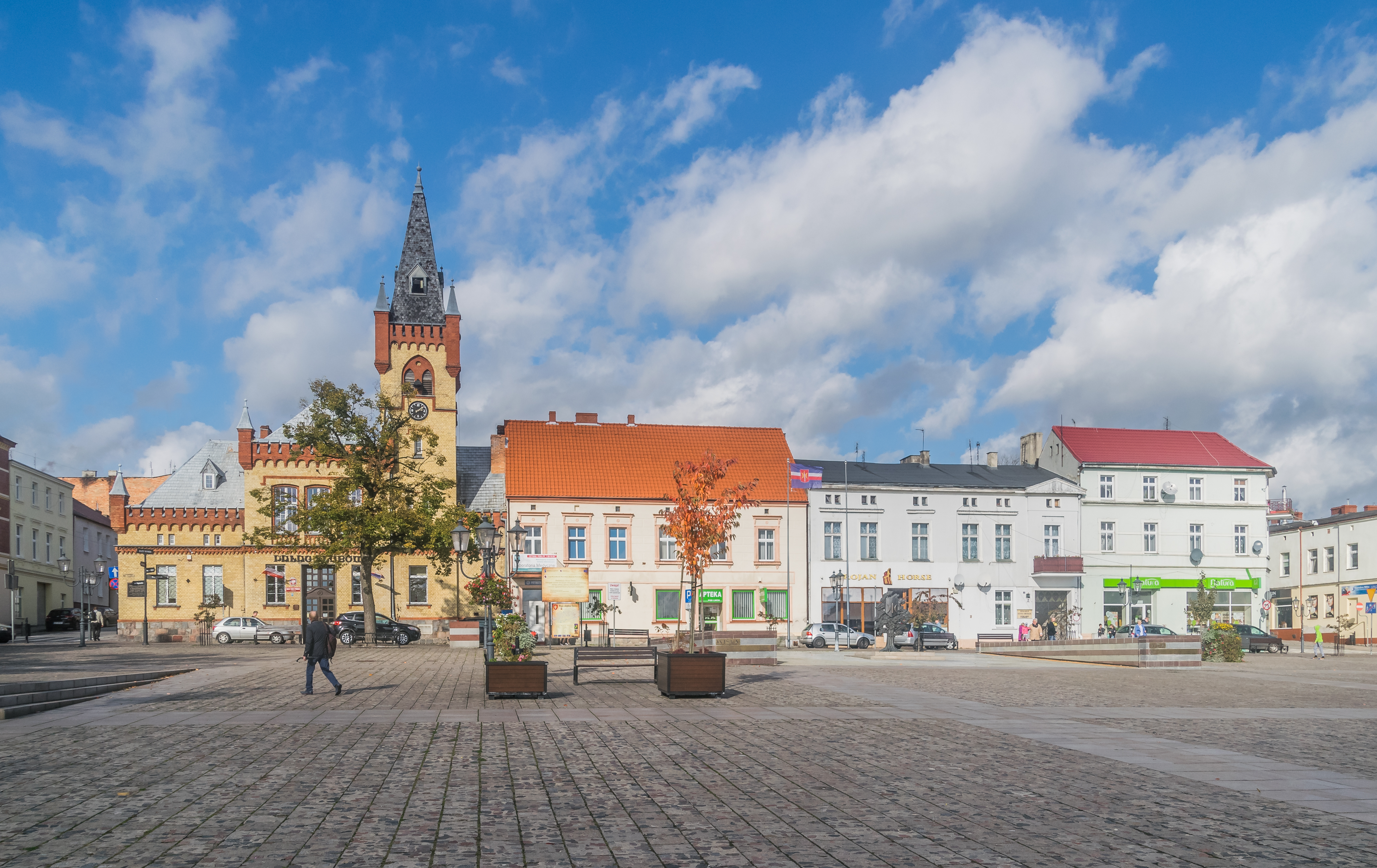
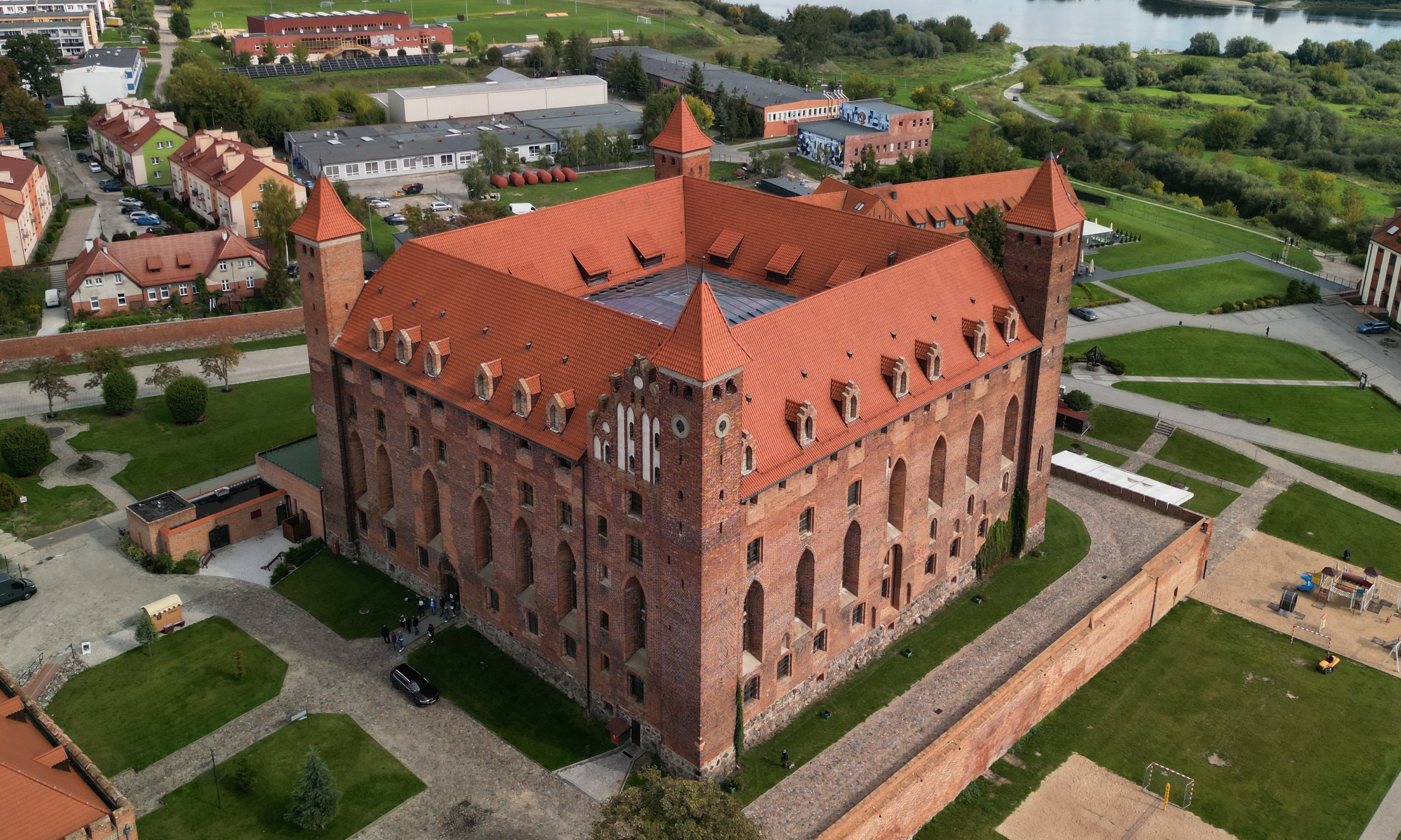
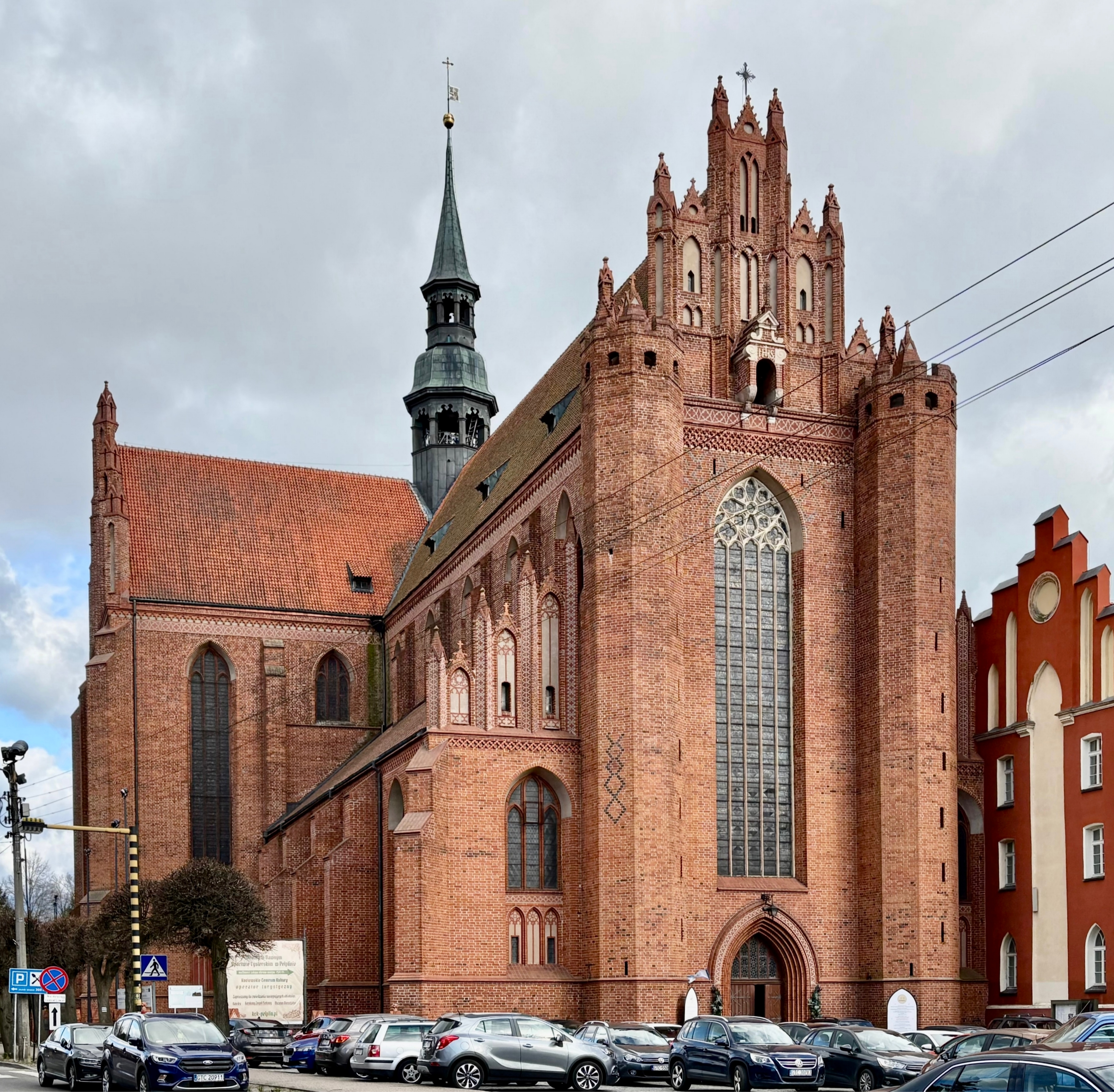
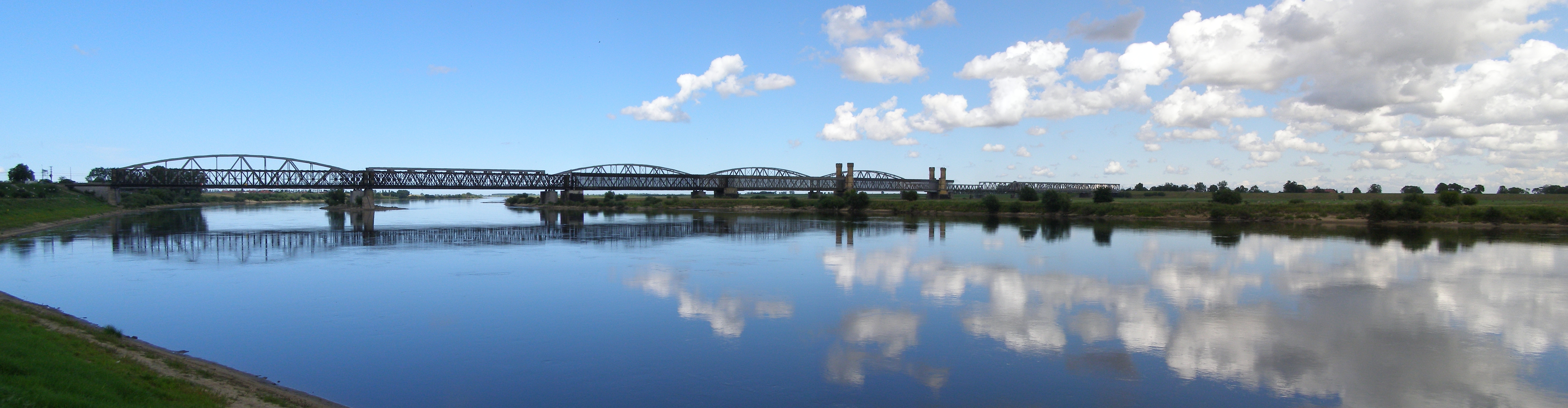
- Starogard Gdański Świecie Gniew Castle Pelplin Cathedral Road bridge over the Vistula in Tczew

- Flag Coat of arms

- Country: Poland
- Traditional capital: Starogard Gdański
- Largest cities: Tczew, Starogard Gdański, Świecie
- Demonym: Kociewians
- Time zone: UTC+1 (CET)
  - Summer (DST): UTC+2 (CEST)

Kociewie is an ethnocultural region in the eastern part of Tuchola Forest, in northern Poland, Pomerania, that is inhabited by the Kociewians. Its cultural capital is Starogard Gdański, the biggest town is Tczew, while other major towns include Świecie, and Pelplin. The region has about 353,000 inhabitants. It has well-developed industry and agriculture. Administratively, it is divided between the Pomeranian and Kuyavian-Pomeranian Voivodeships.

Kociewie is bordered by the Chełmno Land in the south, Powiśle in the east, Kashubia and Żuławy Wiślane in the north, and other parts of historic Pomerania in the west.

== History ==
=== Prehistory ===
The earliest inhabitants of what is now Kociewie are believed to have been from the Upper Paleolithic period. Evidence of the Linear Pottery culture has been unearthed in the region, and a Neolithic settlement discovered at Barłożno. Archaeological evidence from Tczew County indicates that the Kociewian lands were inhabited by people from the prehistoric Funnelbeaker culture. Later Iron Age settlements and cemeteries have also been uncovered in the same area.

=== Early history ===
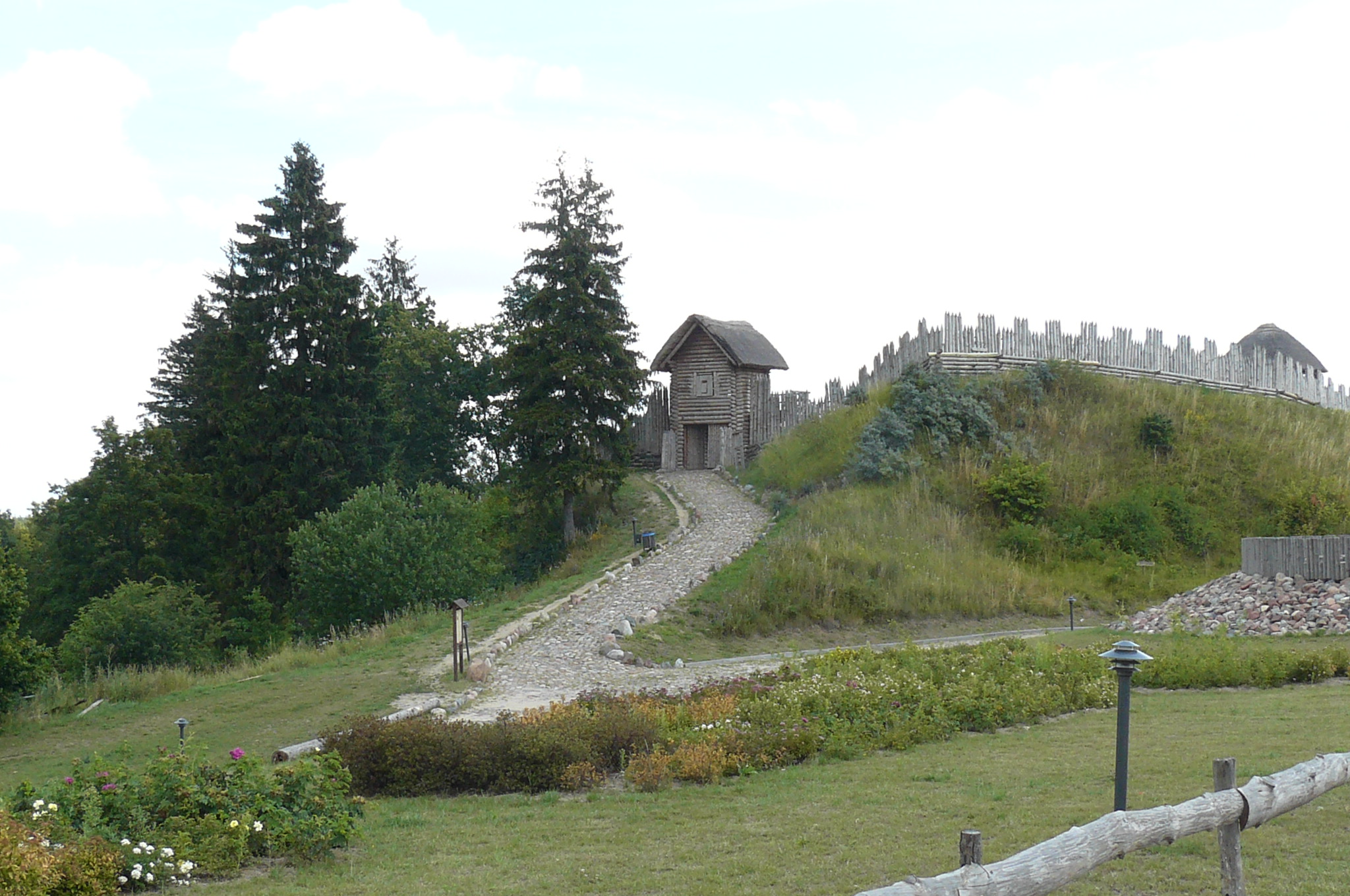
A reconstruction of the 11th century fortified settlement (gard) at Owidz, the original of which was destroyed c. 1090 by Władysław I Herman in order to preclude an uprising in the region

In the mid-10th century, the region was first included within the newly formed Polish state by Mieszko I. Later on, it separated from Poland until the 12th century when Bolesław III Wrymouth re-conquered the region, which was subsequently placed under the rule of Swietopelk I. By the end of the century, the region was ruled under the stewardship of Grzymisław, whose power was organised from the centres of Lubiszewo and Świecie. Kociewie then passed under the nominal rule of Sobiesław I, Sambor I, and Mestwin I before being controlled more directly from Lubiszewo by Sambor II and later his brother Świętopełk II in fortified Tczew.

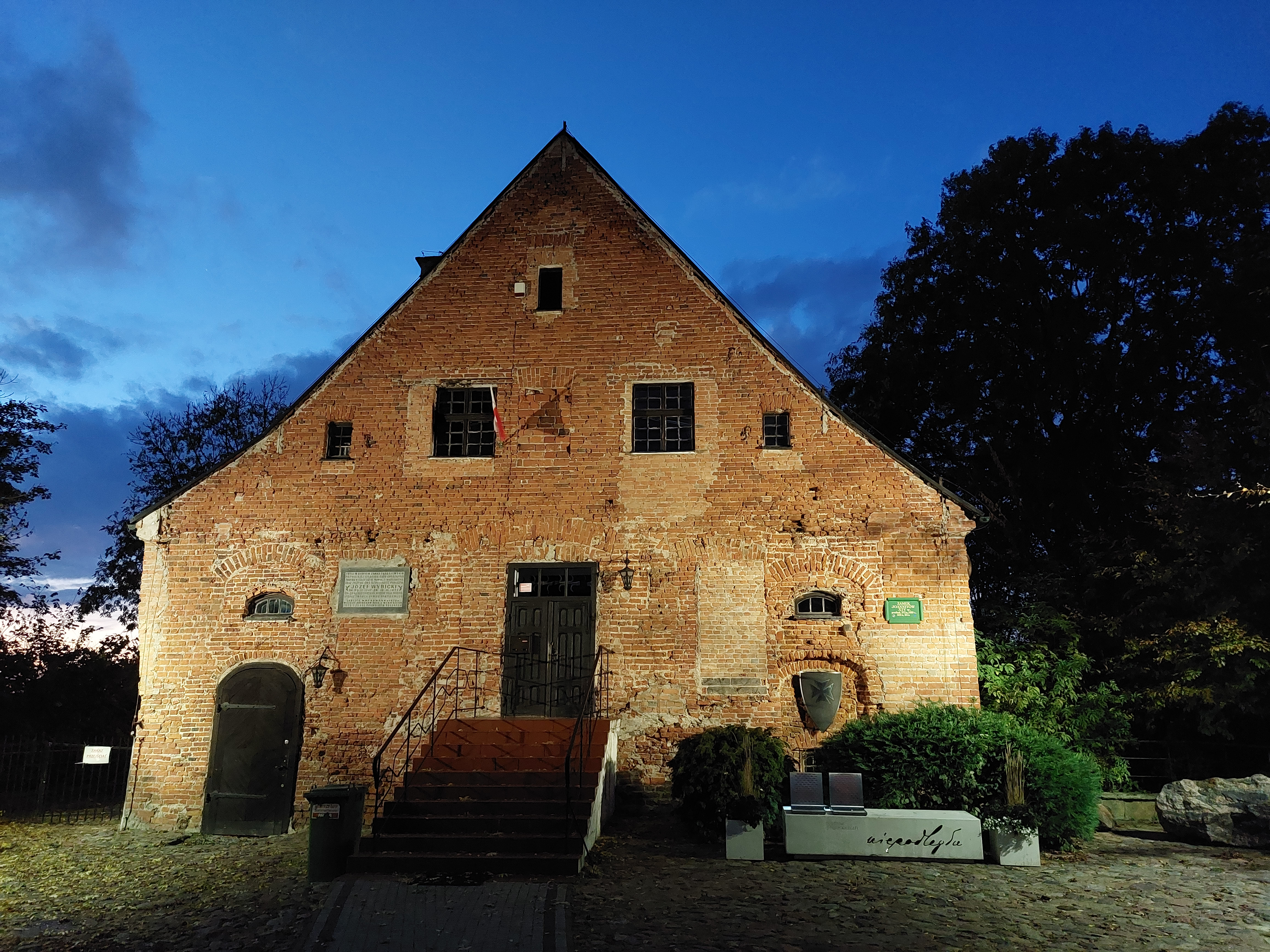
A castle of the Knights Hospitaller in Skarszewy, former court in which Józef Wybicki, the author of the lyrics of the Polish national anthem, studied law

The latter half of the thirteenth century saw Polish control of Kociewie threatened by the forces of both the Teutonic Order and the Holy Roman Empire. This pressure led to Mestwin II ceding the lands around Gniew to the Teutonic Order in 1282. The region then went through a succession of local rulers owing their allegiance to Wenceslaus II of Bohemia or neighbouring states such as the Margraviate of Brandenburg. Eventually, Kociewie was taken over by the Teutonic Order. In 1440, several towns and nobles of Kociewie joined the newly formed anti-Teutonic Prussian Confederation. In 1454, the organization asked Polish King Casimir IV Jagiellon to reincorporate the region into the Kingdom of Poland, to which the King agreed and signed an act of re-incorporation in Kraków. After the subsequent Thirteen Years' War (1454–1466), the longest of all Polish–Teutonic wars, the Teutonic Knights renounced any claims to the region and recognized it as part of Poland.

Within the Kingdom of Poland and Polish–Lithuanian Commonwealth it formed part of the Pomeranian Voivodeship with the capital located in Skarszewy in Kociewie, and county seats located in Nowe, Skarszewy, Starogard, Świecie and Tczew. In the 16th and 17th centuries, there were instances of Scottish immigrants living in Gniew, Starogard and Tczew. In the second half of the 17th century, prior to becoming King of Poland, John III Sobieski served as the starost of Gniew and built the Marysieńka Palace for his wife, Queen Marie Casimire, there. John III Sobieski, as starost, often visited Piaseczno, a local Catholic pilgrimage destination, and as king he ordered the construction of a new, greater vault in the local church of the Nativity of the Virgin Mary, and visited Piaseczno shortly before his death in 1696. In 1762–1765, Józef Wybicki, the author of the lyrics of the Polish national anthem, studied law at the court in Skarszewy. Following the First Partition of Poland in 1772, the region was annexed by Prussia.

=== 19th century ===
The first known mention of the region in the historical record dates to 10 February 1807 when the name Gociewie was used in correspondence between Jan Henryk Dąbrowski and one of his Lieutenant colonels’ during the Greater Poland Uprising. Although, it is likely that the name Kociewie had been in use since the late Middle Ages.

One of the main escape routes for insurgents of the unsuccessful Polish November Uprising from partitioned Poland to the Great Emigration led through Tczew and Starogard.

A map incorporating Florian Ceynowa’s ethnographic classifications

In the mid-19 century the ethnographer Florian Ceynowa described the inhabitants of Kociewie; he named the people around Gniew and Pelplin as the Fetrów and Kociewiem respectively, distinguished by their melodic accents, who farmed pigs and horses. To their north were the Pola of the fields around Starogard Gdański.

Many inhabitants of the region of the region militantly agitated against Prussian rule in Kociewie. The most notorious attempt at an uprising in Kociewie was led by Ceynowa in 1846. In February of that year he organised a force of about 100 Kosynierzy to storm the barracks in, what was then named, Preußisch Stargard. However, the Prussian authorities had been forewarned about the imminent attack, which was subsequently abandoned. The Kociewian uprising was planned to coincide with the Greater Poland Uprising. In 1906–1907, Polish children in Kociewie joined the children's school strikes against Germanisation that spread throughout the Prussian Partition of Poland. Following World War I, Poland regained independence and control of Kociewie.

=== World War II ===
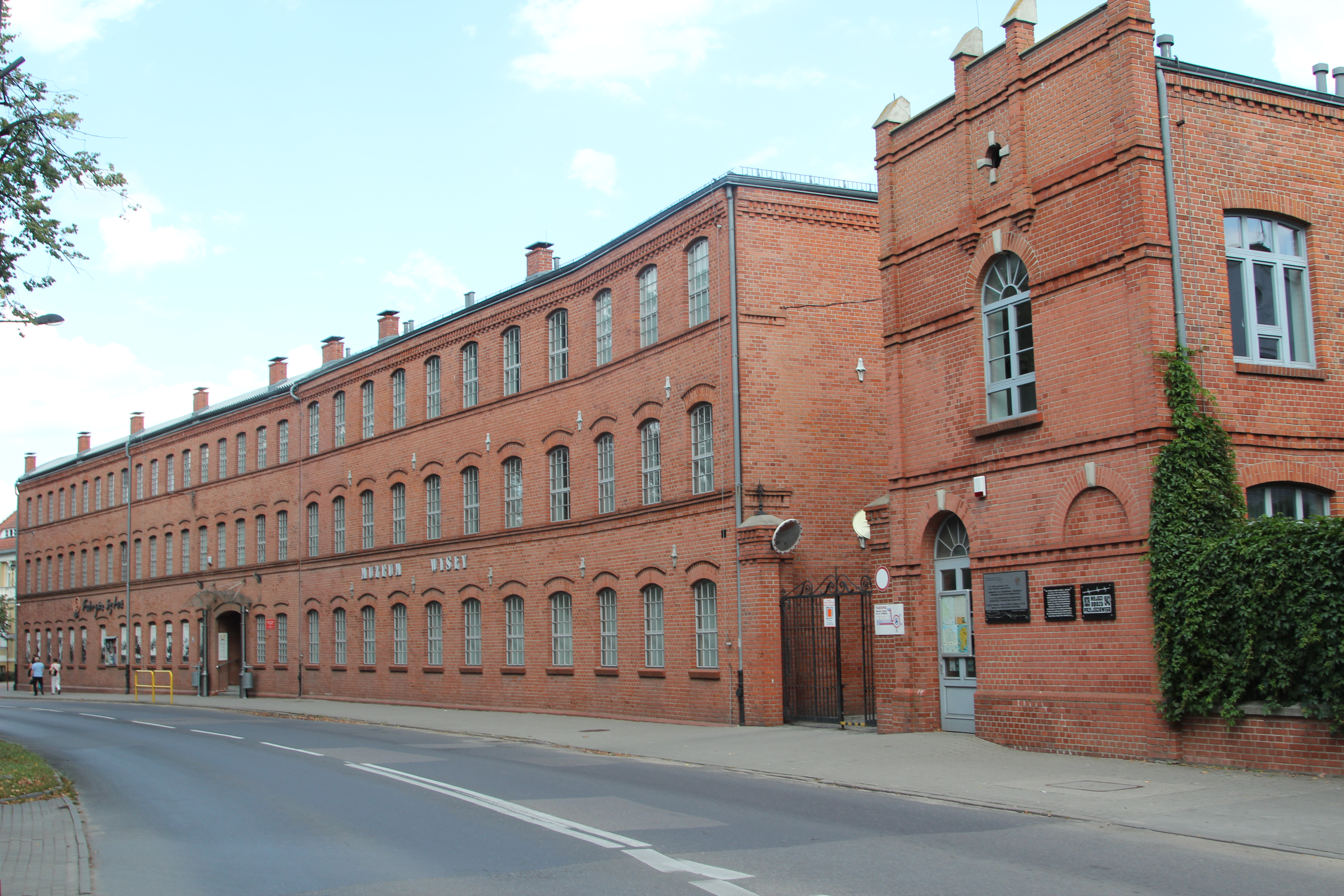
Former Nazi German transit camp for Poles expelled from the region, now Vistula River Museum in Tczew

Following the Nazi German invasion of Poland, which started World War II in September 1939, Kociewie was declared part of the Reichsgau Danzig-West Prussia on 8 October 1939, with its judicial institutions being incorporated into the German system of regional, national, and Higher National courts the following year. Under German occupation, the Polish population was subjected to various crimes, such as mass arrests, imprisonment, slave labor, expulsions, kidnapping of children, deportations to concentration camps and genocide, including the Intelligenzaktion. Major sites of massacres of Poles in the region included Szpęgawsk, Mniszek, Skarszewy and Grupa. The occupiers also murdered the patients of the psychiatric hospitals in Kocborowo (district of Starogard) and Świecie.

== Geography ==
=== Cities and towns ===
	City	Population	Voivodeship	Additional information
1.	Tczew	59,111	Pomeranian	Former royal town of Poland.
2.	Starogard Gdański	47,272	Pomeranian	Traditional capital of Kociewie. Former royal town of Poland.
3.	Świecie	25,614	Kuyavian–Pomeranian	Former stewardship of Duke Grzymisław. Former royal town of Poland.
4.	Czersk	9844	Pomeranian	Located in Chojnice County.
5.	Pelplin	8320	Pomeranian	Site of the Cathedral Basilica of the Assumption. Seat of the Roman Catholic Diocese of Pelplin.
6.	Skarszewy	6468	Pomeranian	Known as the Pearl of Pomerania, it was the capital of the Pomeranian Voivodeship from 1613. Former royal town of Poland.
7.	Gniew	6870	Pomeranian	Former royal town of Poland. Capital of the independent Republic of Gniew.
8.	Nowe	6252	Kuyavian–Pomeranian	Founded by Sobieslaw I. Former royal town of Poland.
9.	Skórcz	3512	Pomeranian	Located in Starogard County.
10.	Czarna Woda	2735	Pomeranian	Located in Starogard County.
11.	Śliwice	2600	Kuyavian-Pomeranian	Located in Tuchola County.
12.	Osie	2520	Kuyavian-Pomeranian	Located in Świecie County.
13.	Kaliska	2189	Pomeranian	Located in Starogard County.
14.	Warlubie	2100	Kuyavian-Pomeranian	Located in Świecie County.
15.	Lubichowo	2052	Pomeranian	Located in Starogard County.

== Genetics ==
In a 2013 study, Y-DNA haplogroups among the Polish population indigenous to Kociewie (n=158) were reported as follows:

56.3% R1a, 17.7% R1b, 8.2% I1, 7.6% I2, 3.8% E1b1b, 1.9% N1, 1.9% J and 2% of other haplogroups.

== Culture ==
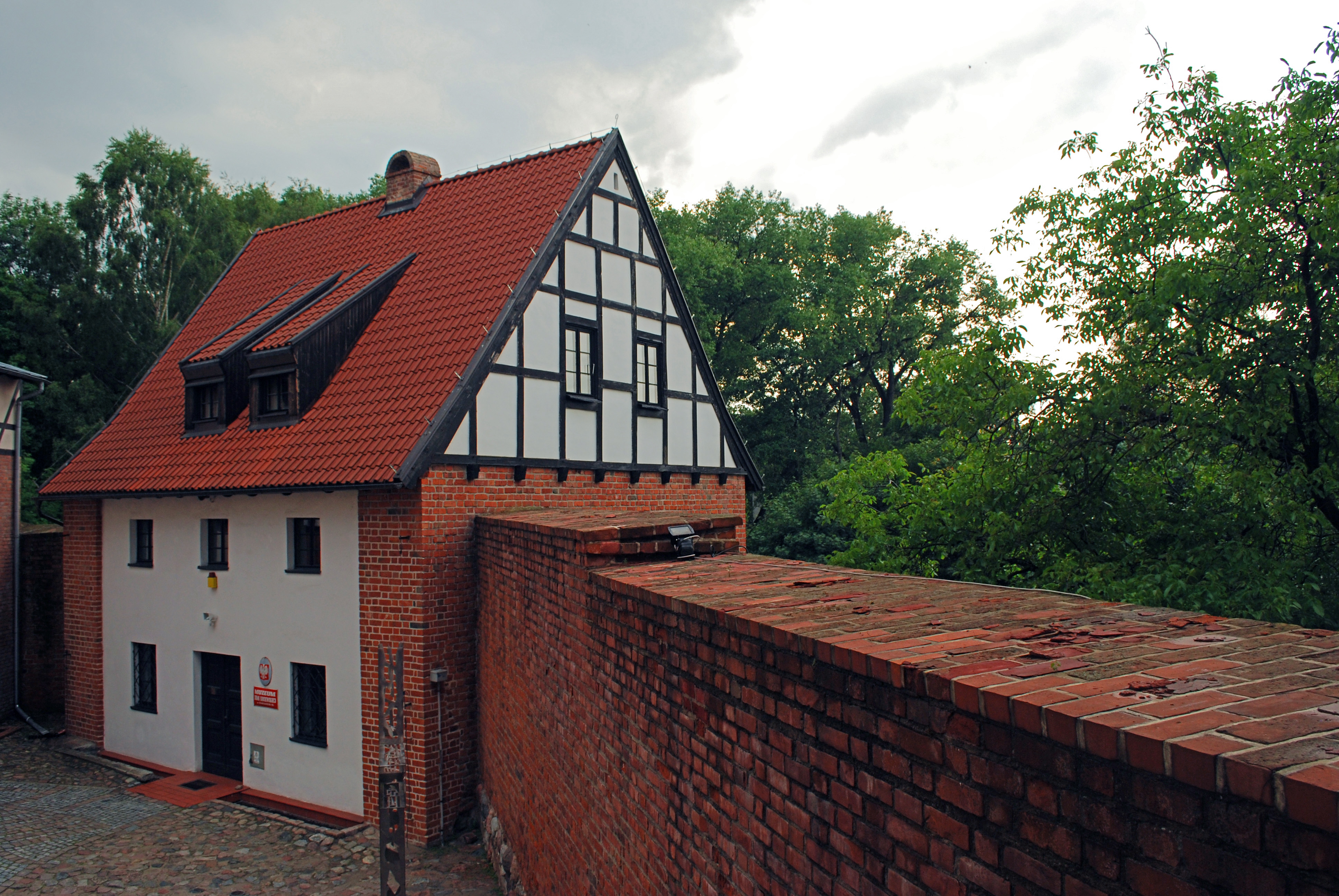
Medieval town walls with the Narożna Tower, part of the Museum of Kociewie Land in Starogard Gdański

The region is rich in historic architecture of various styles, including Gothic, Baroque and Art Nouveau. Most notable Gothic landmarks are the Cathedral Basilica of the Assumption in Pelplin and Gniew Castle. John III Sobieski often resided in Gniew as a local starost before he became King of Poland.

Main museums of the region include:

- Vistula River Museum in Tczew, located in a pre-war agricultural machine factory where during World War II, a transit camp for Poles expelled from the region was established and operated by Nazi Germany.
- The Shipwreck Conservation Centre, a branch of the National Maritime Museum in Gdańsk, is located in Tczew.
- Diocesan Museum in Pelplin, which contains one of the finest collections of medieval art in Poland, and the country's sole copy of the Gutenberg Bible.
- Museum of Kociewie Land (Muzeum Ziemi Kociewskiej) in Starogard Gdański with archaeological, ethnographic and historical collections, located in two medieval defensive towers.

More unique museums include:

- Museum of the History of the Polish Peasant Movement (Muzeum Historii Polskiego Ruchu Ludowego) in Piaseczno, one of three such museums in Poland.
- Museum of Firefighting (Muzeum Pożarnictwa) in Świecie.

== People from Kociewie ==
- Teresa Budzisz-Krzyżanowska (b. 1942), Actress
- Grzegorz Ciechowski (1957–2001), Rock Musician
- Kazimierz Deyna (1947–1989), Footballer
- Grzegorz Gajdus (b. 1967), Long-distance runner
- Andrzej Grubba (1958–2005), Table Tennis Player
- Krzysztof Kosedowski (b. 1960), boxer
- Henryk Jankowski (1936–2010), Catholic priest and member of Solidarity
- Grzegorz Kołodko (b. 1949), Deputy Prime Minister and Finance Minister
- Bronisław Malinowski (1951–1981), track and field athlete
- Oktawia Nowacka (b. 1991), modern pentathlete
- Paweł Papke (b. 1977), politician and volleyball player
- Kazimierz Piechowski (1919–2017), Auschwitz political prisoner and soldier
- Teresa Piotrowska (b. 1955), politician
- Sławomir Pstrong (1975–2015), film and television director
- Danuta Rosani (b. 1951), olympic athlete
- Tomasz Schuchardt (b. 1986), actor
- Anna Szarmach (b. 1978), jazz and pop singer
- Bogdan Wenta (b. 1961), politician and handball coach
- Kazimierz Zimny (1935–2022), olympic athlete

=== Folk Artists ===
- Małgorzata Garnysz (1912–1990)
- Stanisław Rekowski (1895–1984)
- Maria Wespa (1920–1990)

== See also ==
- Kuyavia
