= Bieszczad =

Bieszczad (Polish pronunciation: [ˈbjɛʂtʂat]) is a Polish surname. Notable people with the surname include:

- Gerard Bieszczad, (born 1993), Polish footballer
- Seweryn Bieszczad (1852–1923), Polish painter

== See also ==
- Bieszczady (disambiguation)
