= Bieszczady (yacht) =

Coordinates: 56.6011°N 7.4853°E

- Nation: Poland
- Owner(s): The Polish Scouting and Guiding Association
- Fate: sunk after collision

Specifications
- Type: yawl
- Length: 13.65 meters
- Beam: 3.6 meters
- Sail area: 80 m^{2}

Bieszczady was a Polish sailing yacht (built in 1974) belonging to the Polish Scouting and Guiding Association that sank in the North Sea in the night of 10 September 2000 after a collision with the Hongkong tanker MV Lady Elena. Of eight crew members on board, only one survived.

On 20 September 2001 the Polish Maritime Court (Izba Morska) ruled the disaster was caused in 70% by SY Bieszczady and in 30% by MV Lady Elena. The court explained SY Bieszczady was holding radar reflector which did not meet maritime safety standards and was not showing port and starboard lights. Nevertheless, the court stated MV Lady Elena did not notice Bieszczady's stern light about 10 minutes before the accident, although it should have done it. In the result of the collision seven sailors died.

In June 2002 the Polish Appellate Maritime Court (Odwoławcza Izba Morska) set aside the judgement of September 2001 and sent case to be heard again.

On 5 December 2016, the Maritime Court made a final judgement stating the reason of the tragedy was a failure of "last-moment maneuvers" on both ships caused by "not taking adequate actions to avoid excessive approach". Court found MV Lady Elena behavior after the collision to be "highly inappropriate", as the ship did not start rescue action immediately after the accident.

The wreckage of the yacht is stored in the National Maritime Museum in Gdańsk.

The crew of Bieszczady has been tributed in a song "Requiem for stranger friends of s/y Bieszczady" (Requiem dla nieznajomych przyjaciół z s/y Bieszczady) by Banana Boat. The band renounced any profits from the song because of band's connection to Bieszczady (two members of the band have previously sailed on yacht Bieszczady).

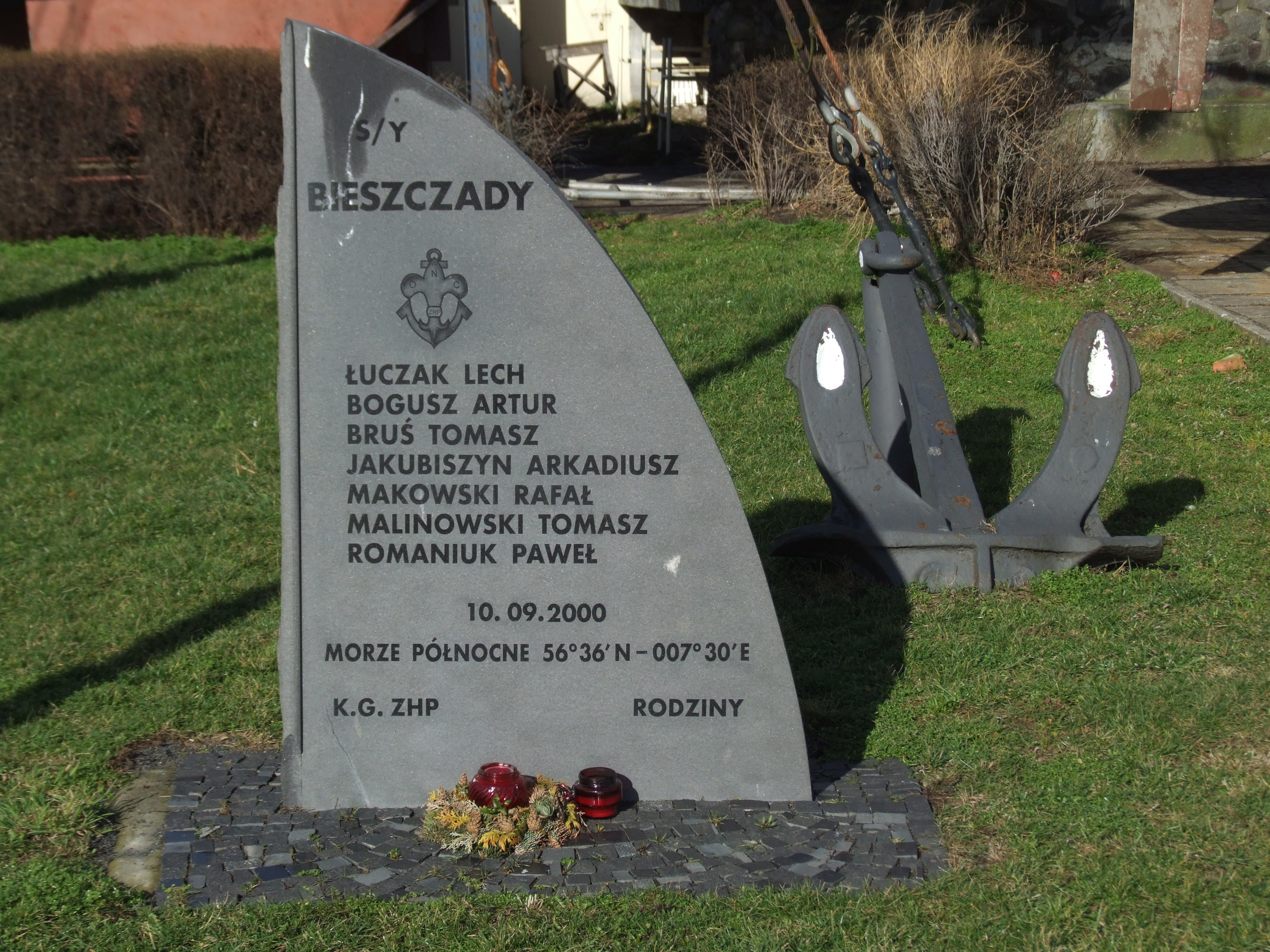
Victims of s/y Bieszczady Sinking Memorial in Gdynia

== Crew ==
On the day of the collision the ship's crew consisted of eight qualified crew members:

- Lech Łuczak (captain) - 40 years of sailing experience
- Artur Bogusz (first officer) - 10 years of sailing experience
- Małgorzata Kądzielewska (second officer) - 5 years of sailing experience, the only survivor
- Arkadiusz Jakubiszyn (third officer) - 15 years of sailing experience
- Tomasz Bruś
- Paweł Romaniuk
- Rafał Makowski
- Tomasz Malinowski
