= Bieszczady =

Bieszczady may refer to:

- Bieszczady County, a region in Poland
  - Bieszczady National Park, a national park in Poland
- Bieszczady Mountains, a mountain range in Poland, Slovakia, and Ukraine
- Bieszczady (yacht), a Polish yacht
