= Flag of Kociewie =

Symbol of Kociewie, a cultural region in Poland

- Proportion: 1:2
- Adopted: 2022
- Designed by: Mateusz Połom

The Flag of Kociewie is the flag that serves as the symbol of Kociewie, an ethnocultural region in Poland, currently divided between the administrative divisions of Starogard, Świecie, and Tczew Counties. The flag is dominated by a yellow isosceles triangle based on the hoist-side pointed toward the fly-side and then divided into two right triangles, a green on a top, and a light blue on the bottom. There is a stylized dark blue cornflower, centered on the hoist side of the middle triangle. The flag was adopted in 2022.

== Design ==
The flag is a rectangle with the rectangle with the aspect ratio of height to width of 1:2. It is dominated by a yellow isosceles triangle based on the hoist-side pointed toward the fly-side and then divided into two right triangles. The upper triangle is green and the lower triangle is light blue. There is a stylized dark blue cornflower, centered on the hoist side of the middle triangle. It consists of 8 stylized flower petals, encircling a compound octagonal star.

The colours yellow, green and blue, symbolise respect, the wheat fields, the forests, and the lakes and rivers. They also allude to the coat of arms of Kociewie. The division into three fields refers to the three counties that form the cultural region, that is Starogard County, Świecie County, and Tczew County. The cornflower is a regional symbol, especially known for its role in tourism marketing.

== History ==
The flag was chosen out of 38 designs submitted to contest held in 2022 by a committee of numerous social, cultural, and administrative organizations from the region of Kociewie. The winning project was designed by Mateusz Połom. Wojciech Cejrowski, the then honorary ambassador of Kociewie, publicly expressed racist criticism of the adoption of the winning design due to its apparent similarity to the colours of the Ukrainian flag.

== See also ==
- Coat of arms of Kociewie
