= Coat of arms of Kociewie =

Polish coat of arms

- Armiger: Kociewie
- Adopted: 7 March 2003
- Shield: Iberian style escutcheon divided into three fields of yellow, green and blue colour.
- Compartment: Red griffin

The coat of arms of Kociewie, a cultural area located in Pomeranian Voivodeship, Poland, depicts a red griffin placed on a background divided into three fields of yellow, green and blue colour.

== Design ==
The coat of arms of Kociewie consists of a blue Iberian style escutcheon (shield) with square top and rounded base, divided into three fields, via lines meeting in the center, each under the 60 decrees angle. Three fields symbolize the three counties of the Pomeranian Voivodeship, Poland, that form the Kociewie region. They are the counties of Tczew, Starogard, and Świecie. The top left field is yellow, the top right, green, and the bottom field, blue. The yellow colour symbolizes the rich yield of the farm fields, green the forests, and blue, the water and clean air. In the centre of the coat of arms is placed a red griffin, standing on its back feet, with risen front legs and wing with 5 big feathers on it. The griffin symbolizes the historical connection of the region to Pomerania, which uses the creature as its symbol. Its design had been based on a griffin present on the seal of duke Sambor II, from the 1260 town privileges document of Tczew.

== History ==
The coat of arms of Kociewie had been established on 7 March 2003, at the Annual General Meeting of the Więźba Kociewska Federation of Associations and Unions in Rokocin. It was chosen from three propositions selected in a contest organized by the Dziennik Bałtycki newspaper. The author of the chosen design was Stanisław Buczkowski, a student of the University of Gdańsk, and the coat of arms was refined graphically by Józef Olszynka and Grzegorz Walkowski.

== See also ==
- Flag of Kociewie
