= Leonid Teliga =

Polish circumnavigating sailor

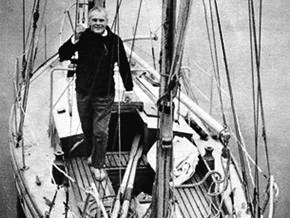
- Born: 28 May 1917; Vyazma, Russia
- Died: 21 May 1970 (aged 52); Warsaw, Poland

Leonid Teliga (28 May 1917 – 21 May 1970) was a Polish sailor, writer, journalist, translator, and the first Pole to single-handedly circumnavigate the globe on his yawl Opty.

== Life ==
=== Youth ===
Although he was born in Russia, his parents decided to settle back in Poland after it regained independence. He was raised in Grodzisk Mazowiecki. After failing to get into medical studies, he decided to attend military academy. In 1937 he finished a yachting course in Jastarnia.

=== During and after World War II ===
During the September Campaign Teliga fought in 44th Infantry Regiment, and was wounded at Tomaszów Mazowiecki. In 1940 he arrived in Azov, where he took a skipper course and became a fisherman. Eventually he took part in the evacuation of harbours on Crimea. In 1942 he joined the newly-formed Anders Army, established in the Soviet Union and made up mainly of Polish POWs, with which he got through to Great Britain. After taking a navigation course in Canada, he fought as a gunner in the No. 300 Squadron, a unit of the Polish Air Forces in Great Britain.

Teliga returned to Poland in 1947. He used every occasion to return to the sea, sometimes as a skipper or sailing instructor, later as a journalist. In the 1950s and 1960s he published several short story collections and novels based on his various voyages. In 1957 Teliga went to North Korea to participate in the works of UN Armistice Commission.

=== Circumnavigation of the Earth ===
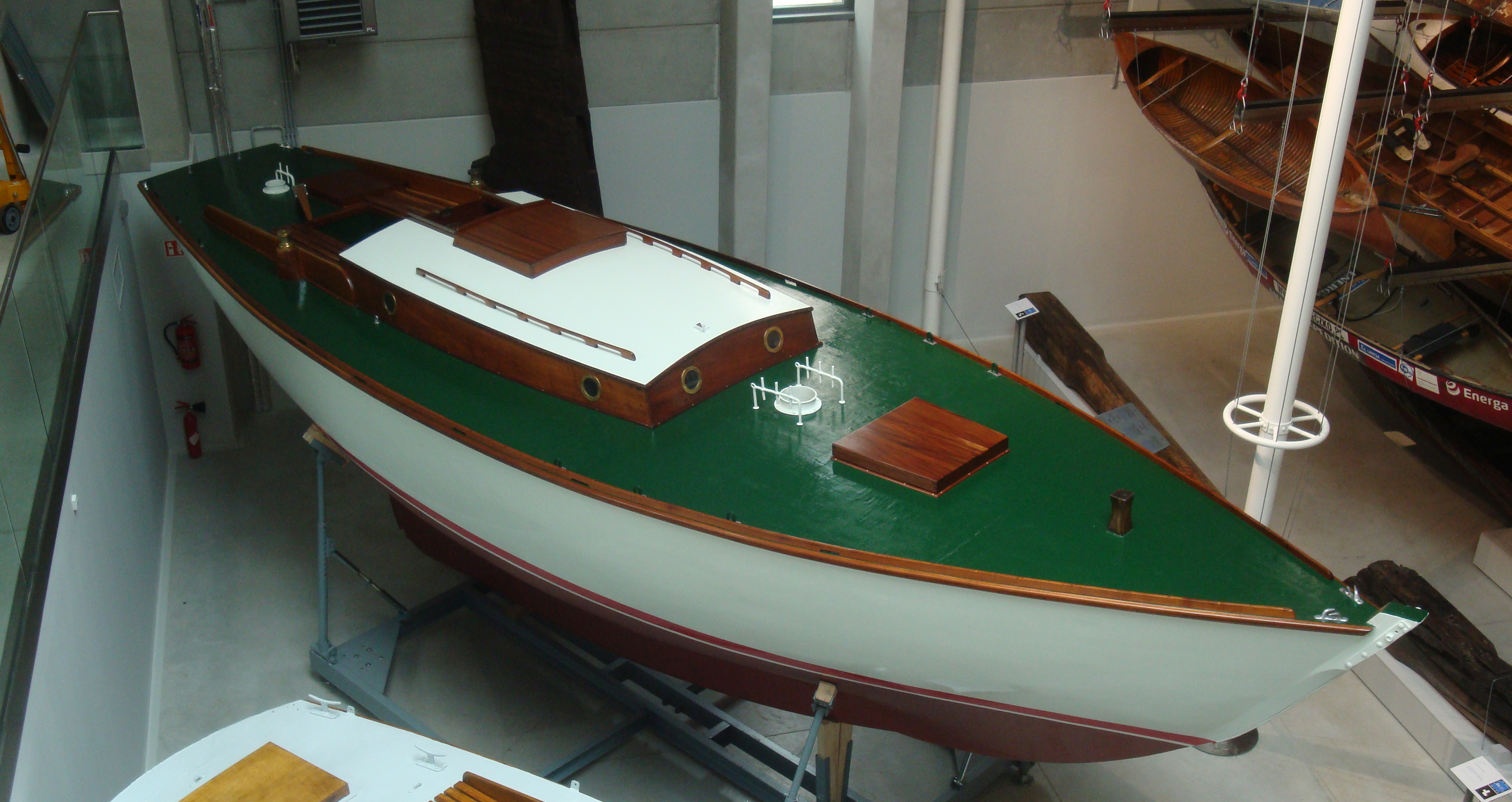
Sailing yacht Opty - boat of Leonid Teliga, the first Pole who single-handedly circumnavigated the globe. Presently on exhibition in Shipwreck Conservation Centre in Tczew

The yacht Opty was designed by engineer Leon Tumiłowicz, based on his earlier construction, the Tuńczyk class, but modified so that it would better fit the task of long, solitary cruise. Tuńczyk's predecessor, the Konik Morski type, was the first Polish seagoing construction, designed in 1936. The construction of Opty began in January 1966 and finished in October. Although he received some support from Polish Yachting Association and other sources, Teliga funded the construction mostly on his own. Even though its masts and booms were wooden, the yacht was fairly well equipped, as it had a pneumatic raft, a plastic boat for easier communication with the coast, and a wide set of sails for every kind of wind.

After having Opty transported to Casablanca, Teliga began his journey on 25 January 1967, heading west. During the course of the cruise he visited Canary Islands, Lesser Antilles, Panama Canal, Galápagos Islands, Marquesas Islands, Tahiti, Bora Bora, Fiji, and Dakar. In Panama Canal he experienced an unexpected delay, as it took eleven days to persuade the Canal's administration to let him pass. Most likely this was the reason for him to skip Australia and do the final section of the circumnavigation without any landings, as after failing to get Australian visa he expected similar obstructions there.

During his journey, Teliga became fairly well known, and acquired honorary membership of several yacht clubs. He experienced a hospitable welcome in nearly every port, and, incidentally, met compatriots in most of them.

Cruising non-stop from Fiji to Dakar for 165 days, he beat the world record previously held by Bernard Gilboy, who sailed single-handedly for 163 days in an attempt to cross the Pacific Ocean. However, when Teliga landed in Dakar on 9 January 1969, Robin Knox-Johnston has already been at sea for 210 days.

On 5 April 1969 he crossed his course from 1967, finishing the circumnavigation. It took him "2 years, 13 days, 21 hours and 15 minutes"

Due to rapidly developing cancer, Teliga was forced to stop in Casablanca. He was transported back to Poland by plane. Despite having an operation, he died in May 1970.

== Bibliography ==
- Leonid Teliga - Polish Sailing Encyclopedia (pl.)
