= Grzymisław (steward) =

Steward of Świecie and Lubiszewo
- Reign: 13th century – 1207/1209
- Successor: Mestwin I
- Born: 1153/1158
- Died: 1207/1209
- Spouse: Dobrosława
- Dynasty: Samboride

Grzymisław (Polish: [ɡʐɘ̟ˈmi.swaf]; 1153/1158 – 1207/1209) was a nobleman from the Samboride dynasty, who was a steward of Świecie and Lubiszewo within the Duchy of Pomerelia.

== Biography ==
Grzymisław was born between 1153 and 1158. He was a nobleman from the Samboride dynasty, and was a steward of Świecie and Lubiszewo within the Duchy of Pomerelia, under the rule of the Kingdom of Poland. The first record of his name comes from 11 November 1198. Originally, the seat of land was located in Starogard Gdański, and was later to Świecie. After 1195, he married Dobrosława, with whom he had daughters, one of whom could possibly be Zwinisława, a wife of duke Mestwin I. Grzymisław died between 1207 and 1209, and was succeeded by Mestwin I.
