= Shipwreck Conservation Centre =

Branch of the National Maritime Museum in Gdańsk, Poland

- Centrum Konserwacji Wraków Statków
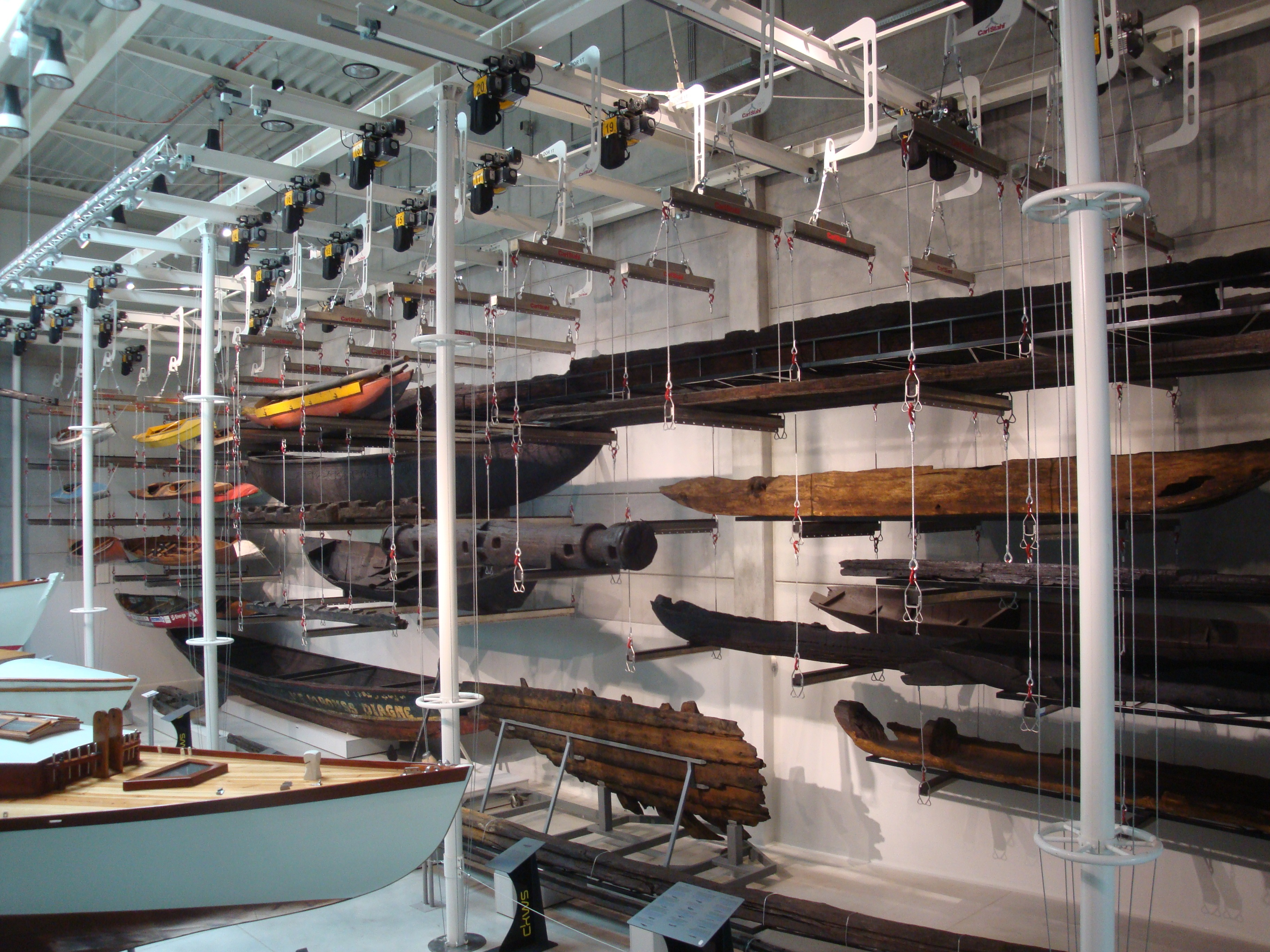
- Established: 2016
- Location: Tczew, Poland
- Coordinates: 54.084804°N 18.794965°E
- Director: Bogusław Sobkowicz
- Website: Official website

The Shipwreck Conservation Centre (Polish: Centrum Konserwacji Wraków Statków) is a branch of the National Maritime Museum, opened in 2016 in a purpose-built building in Tczew, near the Vistula River Museum. The centre is devoted to the study of historical ships, particularly shipwrecks, as well as ship renovation and building techniques. The museum consists of two main parts: the conservation workshop and the studio warehouse.

== Funding ==
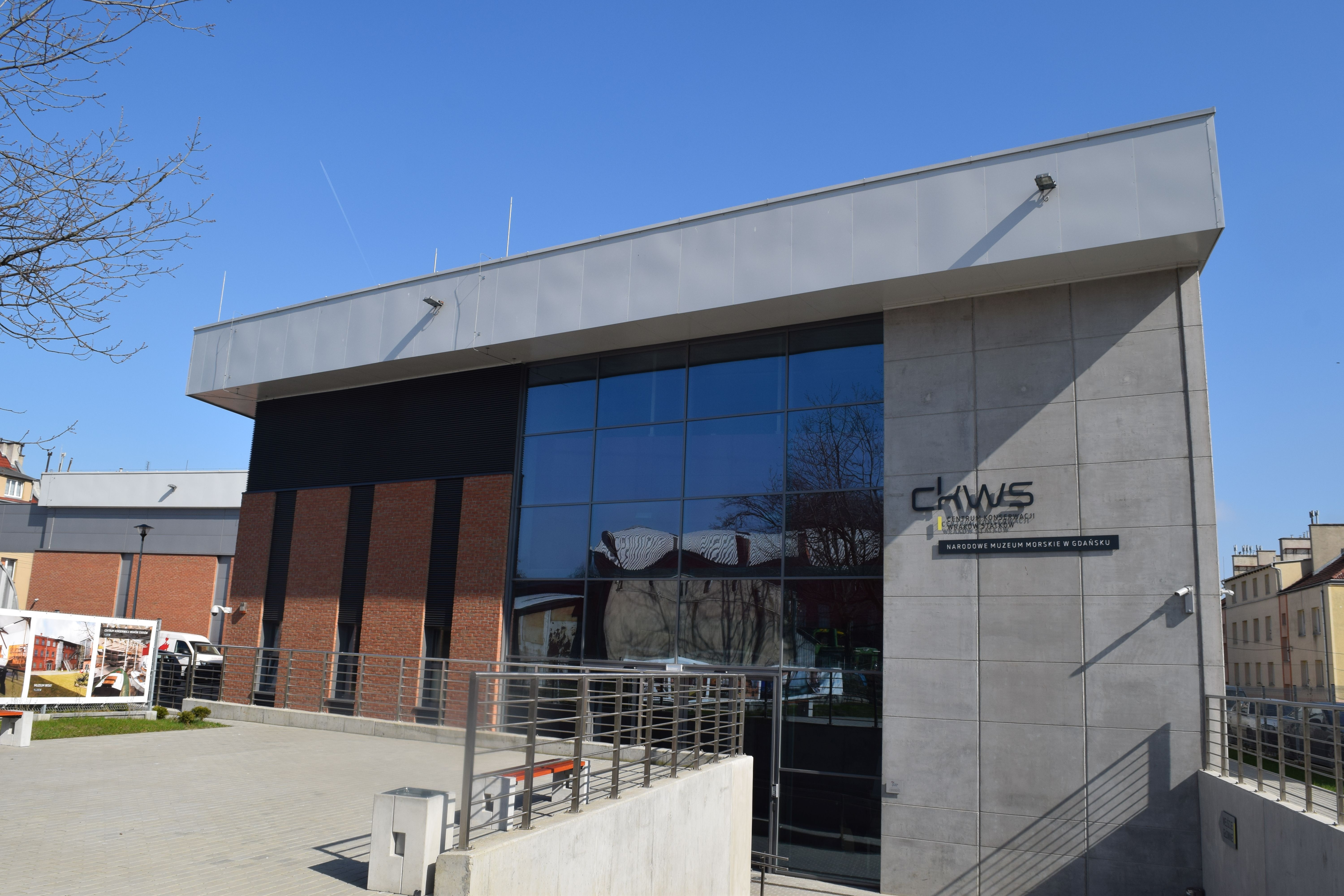
Shipwreck Conservation Centre

The Centre was opened thanks to a collaboration with the Norwegian Maritime Museum in Oslo and the Museum of Cultural History, Oslo. It was funded by the EEA and Norway Grants (85%) and the Polish Ministry of Culture and National Heritage (15%). The aim of the grant was to make maritime heritage accessible to young people and future generations.

== Conservation workshop ==
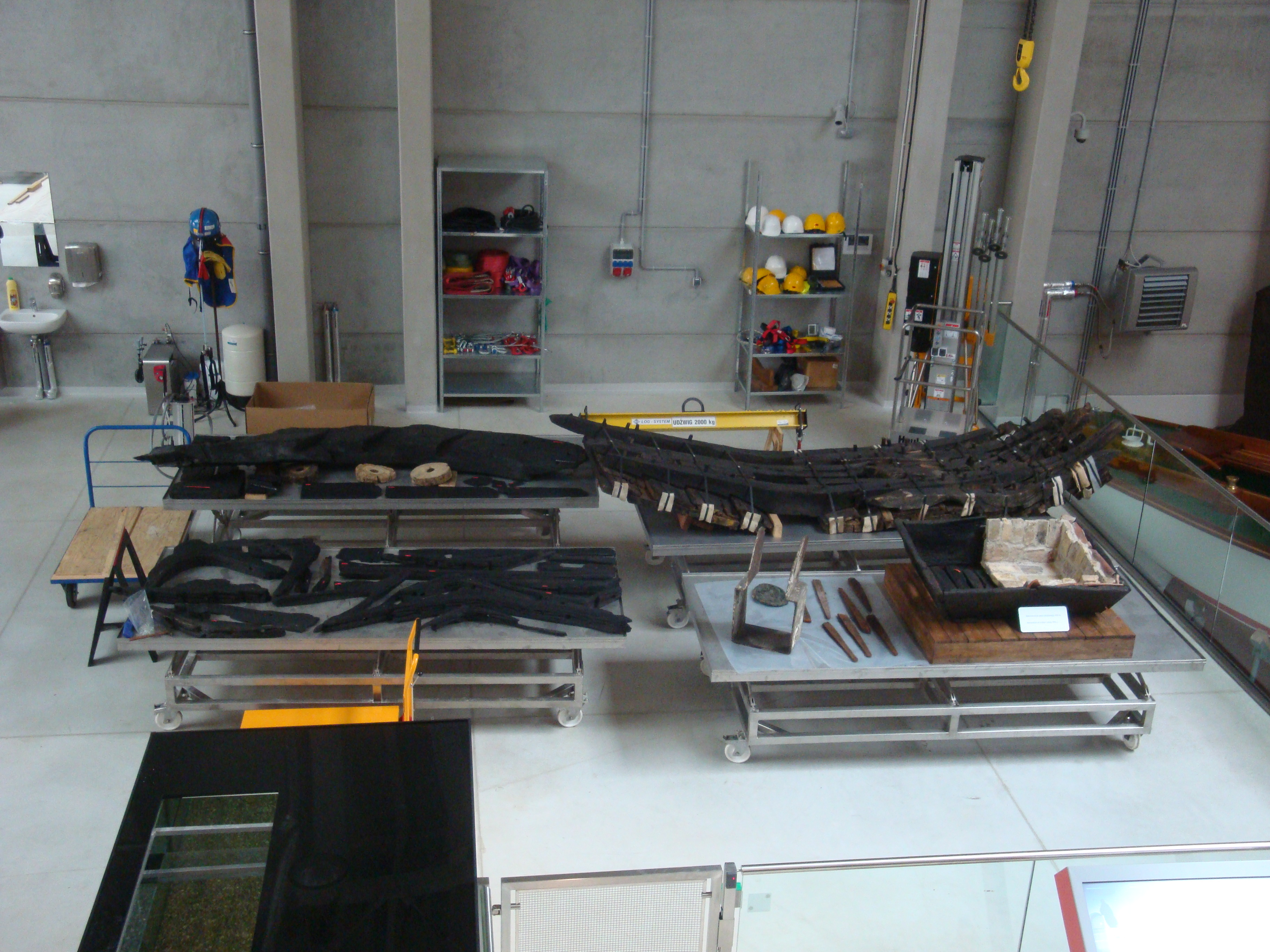
Conservation workshop at Shipwreck Conservation Centre

The workshop is fitted with modern equipment and is used to conduct the conservation and reconstruction of recovered fragments of ships and other objects. The workshop is divided into smaller work areas including a steel workshop, a boat building and carpentry workshop; RTG and scanning equipment and a spectrometer used for examining the composition of metal fragments.

Wood recovered from underwater by archeologists is conserved in a special tank system, where it can be immersed in special solutions. Cleaning objects made of metal is accomplished using specialised cleaner machines. Heavy elements are moved with a gantry crane capable of lifting up to 5 tons.

The workshop is a large warehouse, without inner walls. The mezzanine allows visitors to see the restoration works in progress and observe each stage of conservation and reconstruction.

== Studio warehouse ==
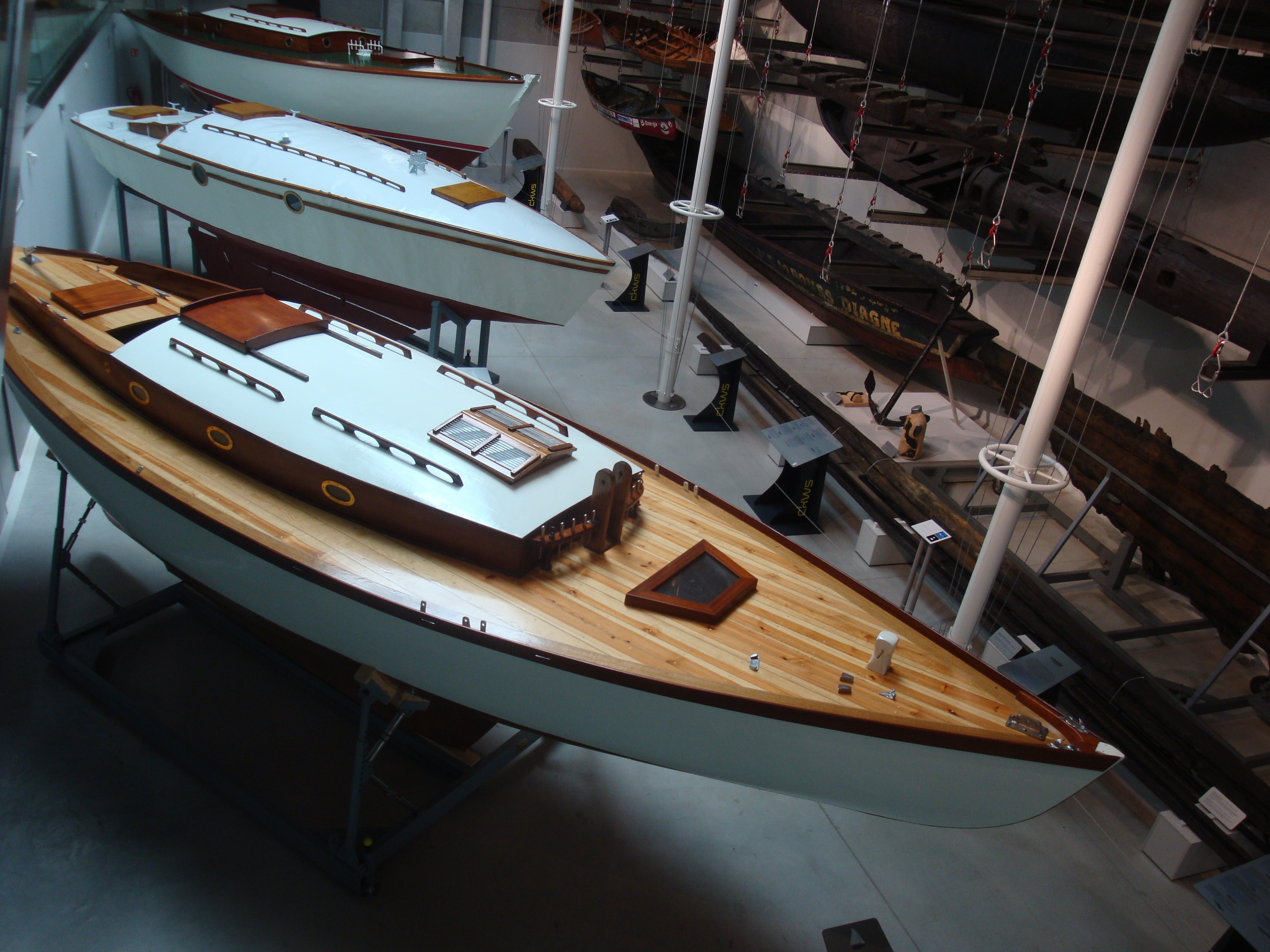
Boats displayed in the studio warehouse section

The studio warehouse serves as a large exhibition space. Along one of the walls, historical boats and boat fragments are hung. The boats originate from Poland (the oldest presented boats were built in the 5th and 7th centuries AD) and Africa (acquired by Polish ship crews, and by the National Maritime Museum's own underwater research crew). The exhibition also features a collection of kayaks from the 1930s to 1950s.

The floor area is used to display large ship elements such as the keel and fragment of side of The Copper Ship (Polish: Miedziowiec). The exhibition is completed by three historical yachts: Opty (yacht of Leonid Teliga, the first Pole to single-handedly circumnavigate the globe), Dal (on which Andrzej Bohomolec, Jerzy Świechowski and Jan Witkowski were the first Poles to sail across the Atlantic) and Kumka IV – a pioneering construction by Tadeusz Sołtyk, one of the first welded yachts.

Smaller objects (elements of ship equipment and cargo) are placed in the studio warehouse shelving units, where visitors can see them from up close.

== Visitor facilities ==
The Centre conducts educational activities (museum lessons and guided tours of the conservation workshop).

The museum is accessible to people with disabilities. Guided tours for people with impaired vision are offered, including the possibility to explore selected exhibits by touch.

== See also ==
- National Maritime Museum, Gdańsk
