= National Maritime Museum, Gdańsk =

National Maritime Museum in Gdańsk
- Narodowe Muzeum Morskie

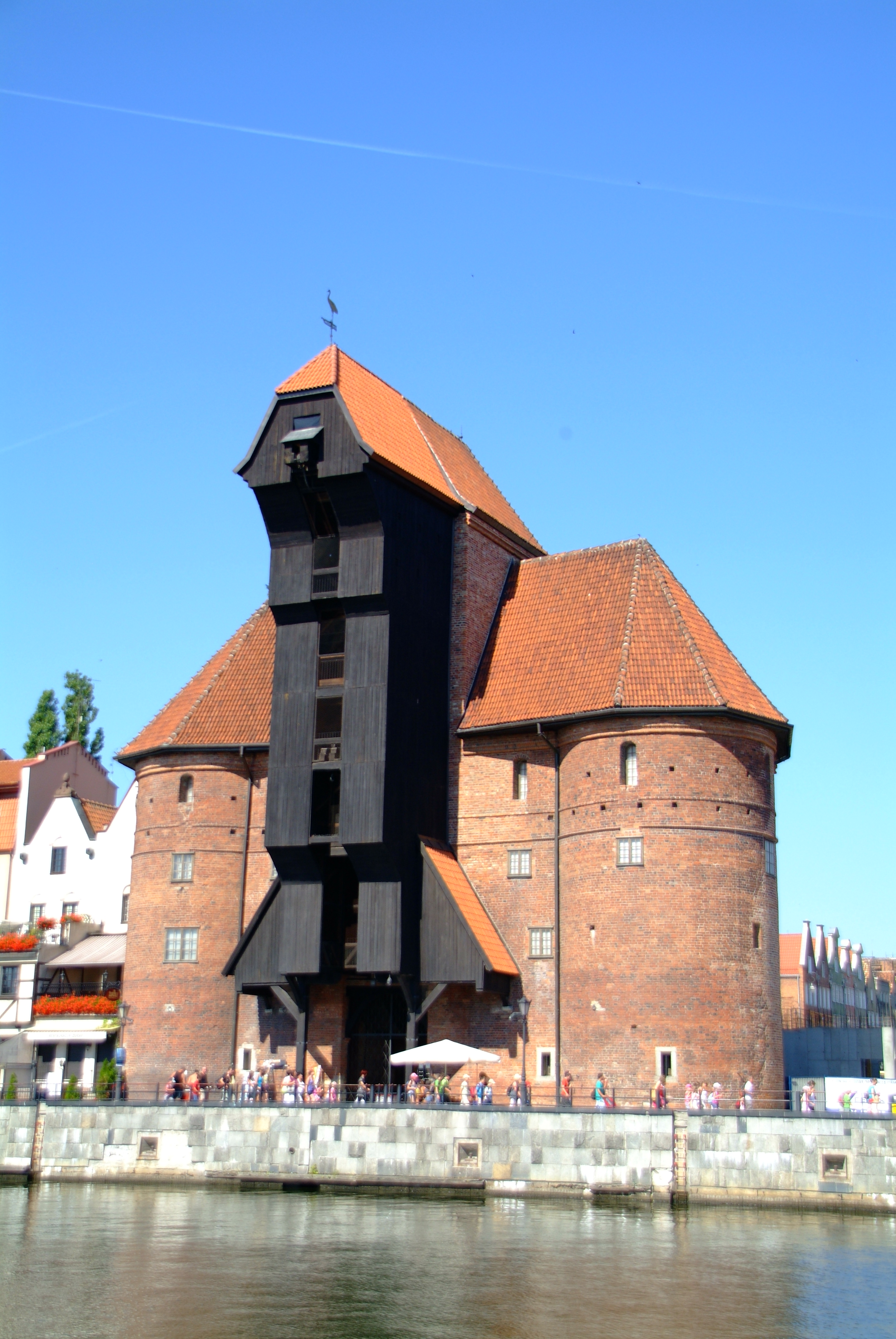
- The Crane - first main site of the museum
- Former name: Centralne Muzeum Morskie (Central Maritime Museum), Polskie Muzeum Morskie (Polish Maritime Museum)
- Established: 1 January 1962
- Location: Gdańsk, Poland
- Coordinates: 54.351040°N 18.659°E
- Type: Maritime museum
- Collection size: over 28 thousands objects
- Director: Jerzy Litwin
- Website: nmm.pl

The National Maritime Museum in Gdańsk (Polish: Narodowe Muzeum Morskie) is a maritime museum in Gdańsk, Poland, established on 1 January 1962. It is dedicated to gathering, researching and preserving artifacts and documents concerning ship transport, international trade, fishing and culture of people working at sea, rivers and those ashore as well as the dissemination of knowledge on maritime history of Poland and its economy through the ages.

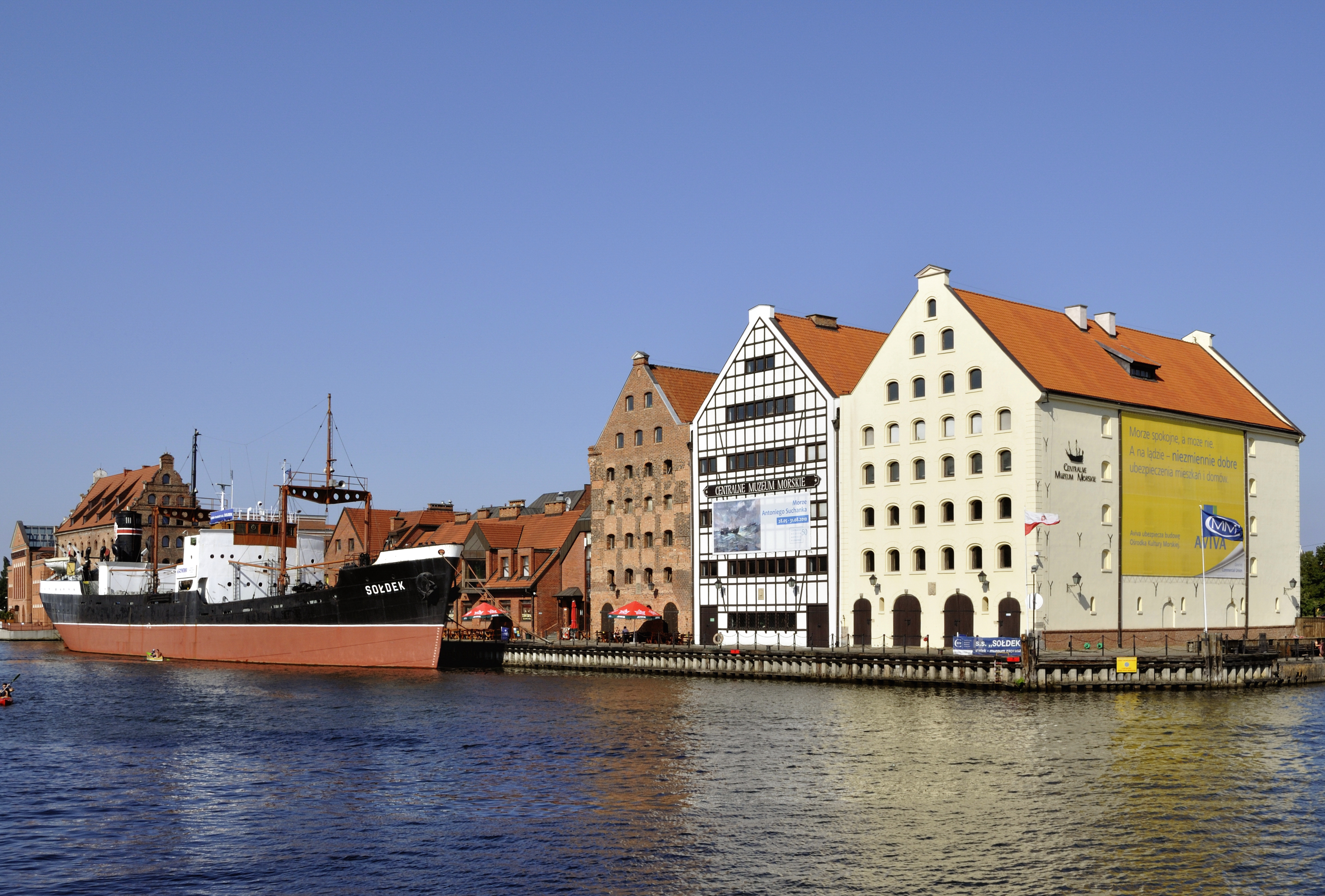
Granaries and SS Sołdek

== History ==
In 1958, a Museum's Friends Association was established, and with the participation of Przemysław Smolarek (employee of the National Museum, Szczecin), the Association organised an exhibition titled From a paddle to a nuclear drive in Artus Court in Gdańsk. Przemysław Smolarek lobbied for the creation of a dedicated maritime museum in Poland and his efforts were successful: in 1959, by the decision of adequate authorities (government ministers aided by the Museum of Technology, Warsaw), such a museum was formed in Gdańsk. Przemysław Smolarek was tasked with the preparation work. The museum was officially established on 1 January 1962, and Smolarek was nominated its director. He remained at this position until his death in 1991.

At first the museum was located in the medieval Gdańsk Crane, but soon started to branch out. In 1963 the first branch, the Lighthouse Museum in the Rozewie Lighthouse, was opened, followed by the Fishery Museum on Hel Peninsula in 1972. In 1972 the institution has been renamed Polish Maritime Museum and granted the status of a national institution.

In 1977 the museum gained a restored building adjacent to the Crane, and opened a department there named Skład Kolonialny (The Colonial Collection). In 1984, further branches were opened: the Vistula River Museum in Tczew, as well as the sailing vessel Dar Pomorza (previously training vessel of Maritime Academy of Gdynia), which had been converted into a museum ship and a new branch of the Maritime Museum. The next museum ship joining Maritime Museum's “fleet” was Sołdek, the first ocean-going ship (steamer) built in Gdańsk after World War II. It was handed over to the museum in 1989. Also in 1989, the museum gained the restored granaries on Ołowianka, an island forming the center of the old port in Gdańsk. Since 2000, five granaries belong to the museum and have been converted into the main museum building.

In 2012, the Maritime Culture Centre was opened in the building occupied previously by the former Colonial Collection, forming a new branch of the museum. Since 2013 the museum functions under a new name: the National Maritime Museum (Narodowe Muzeum Morskie).

In 2016 the newest branch, the Shipwreck Conservation Centre (Centrum Konserwacji Wraków Statków), was opened in Tczew, near the Vistula River Museum.

== Branches ==
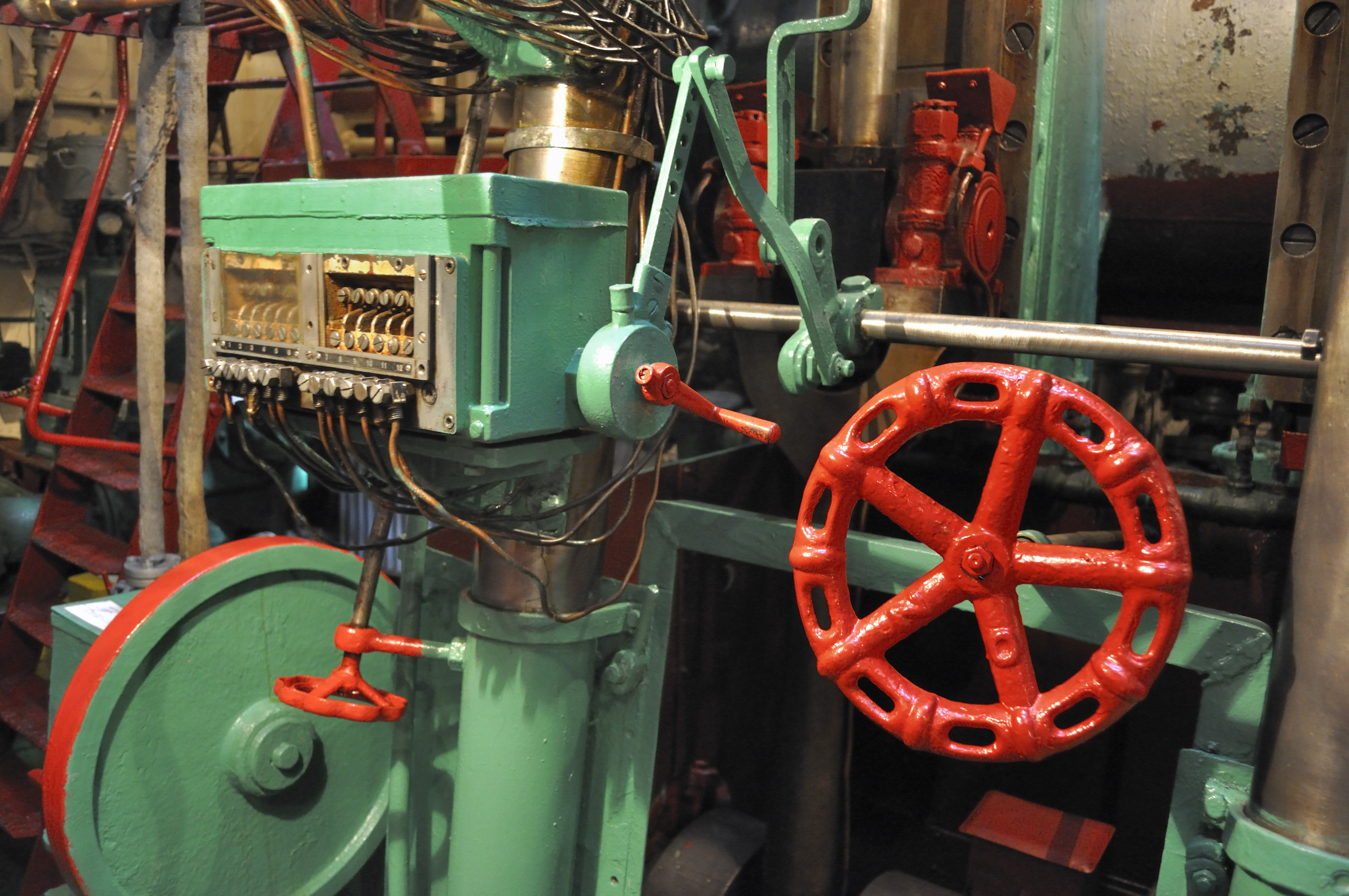
In Engine Room of Sołdek

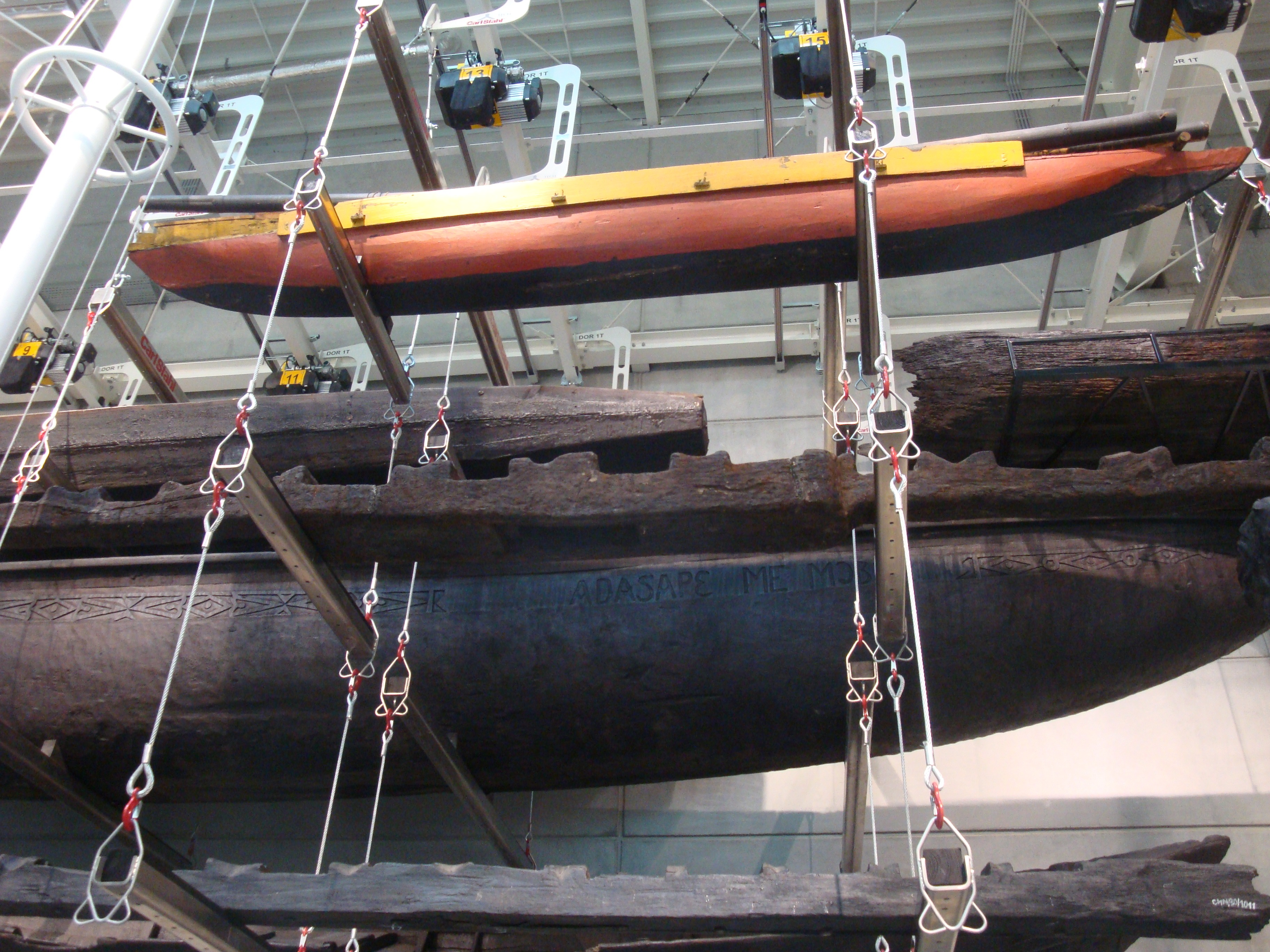
Boats on exposition inShipwreck Conservation Centre

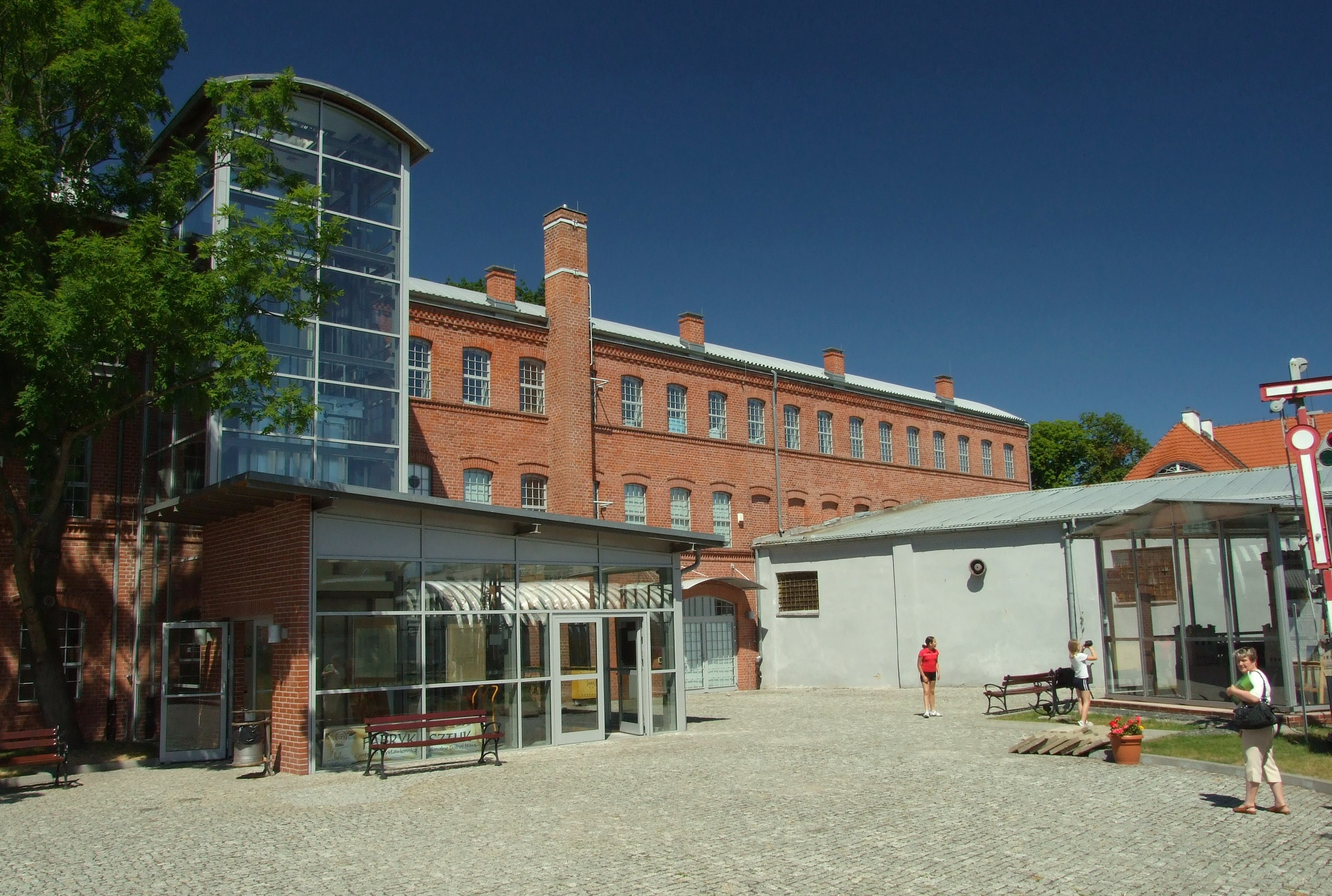
Vistula River Museum

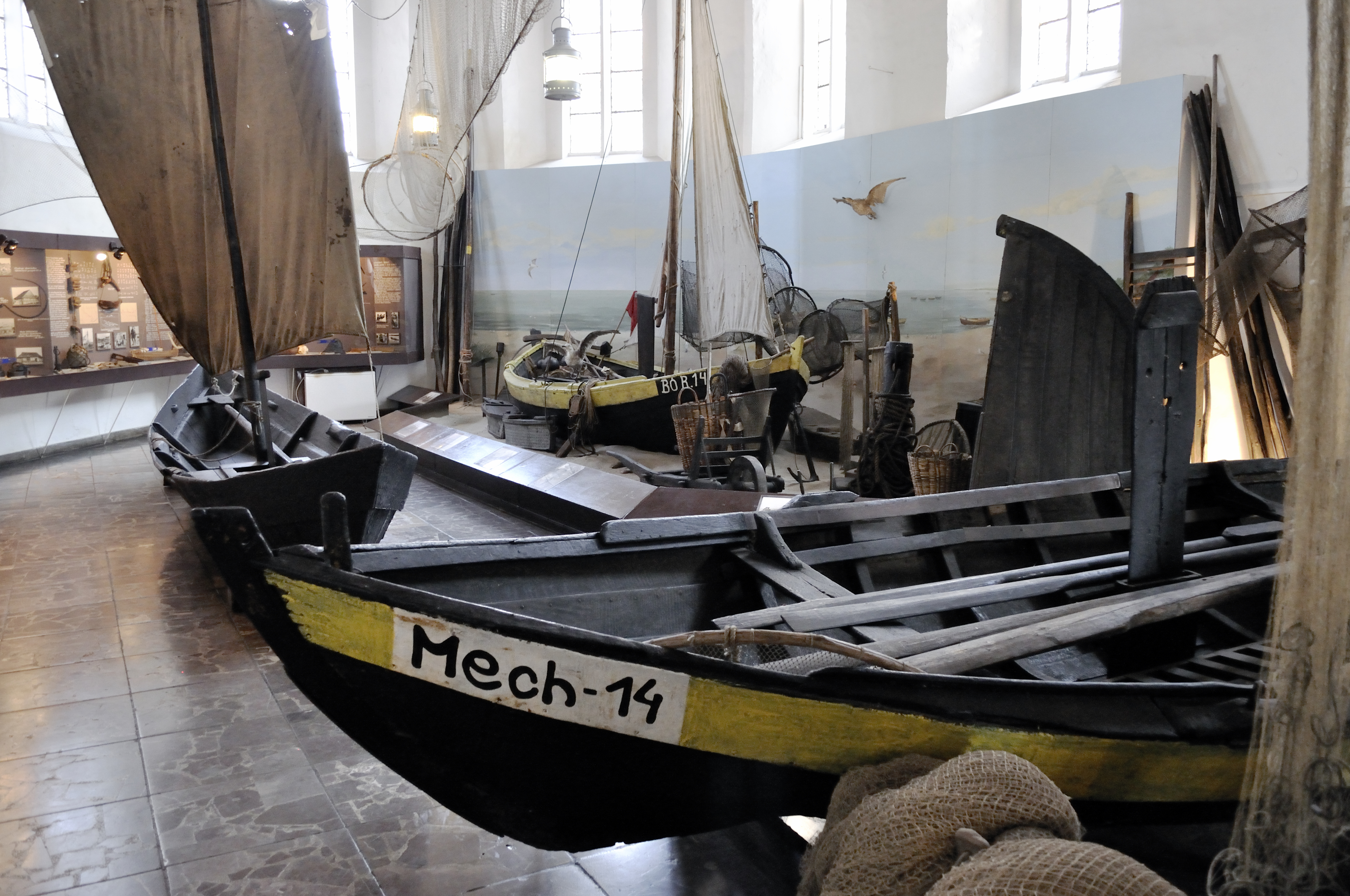
Fishery Museum in Hel

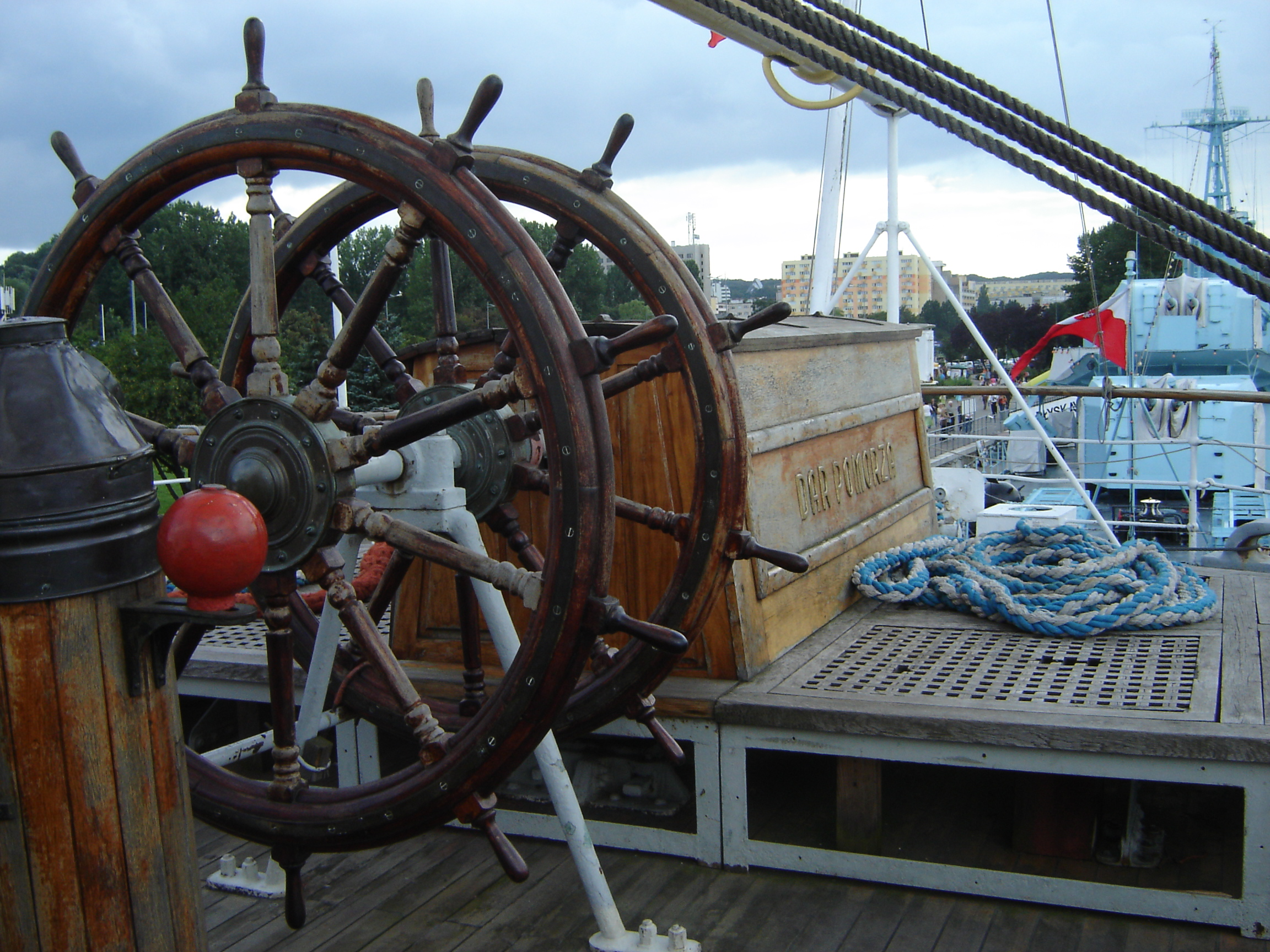
On deck of Dar Pomorza

Presently the museum consists of eight branches:

- The Crane – located in a medieval port crane (built in the 15th century, rebuilt after war damages in the 1950s) – hosts exhibitions about the historical port and people working there (carriers, dockers, merchants, skippers, sail makers, rope makers).
- Granaries on Ołowianka Island – main site of the museum. Within it there are three galleries: "Poles on the Seas of the World", "Underwater Archaeology and Diving" and "Maritime Gallery" containing artworks depicting maritime themes.
- Maritime Culture Centre – designated as an education facility, the MCC houses a water tank in which remote-controlled models help to understand how ships are maneuvered. At the MCC there are also facilities showing the process of loading cargo and other maritime activity. The other exhibition, "Boats of People of the World" displays various boats from all over the world.
- Fisheries Museum in Hel – located in a 15th-century church building contains items showing history of fishery in Gulf of Gdańsk and Baltic Sea, culture of Kashubians.
- Vistula Lagoon Museum in Kąty Rybackie – presents the history of shipbuilding and fishing on the Vistula Lagoon.
- Vistula River Museum in Tczew - housed in a 19th-century industrial building - shows objects illustrating commercial aspects of sailing along the Vistula. This exhibition is meant as a reminder of the value the Vistula river had for Polish trade in the period between the 15th and 18th centuries, and features boats and rafts used to transport grain and timber product.
- Shipwreck Conservation Centre in Tczew – this branch consists of two parts. The first is Studio Warehouse, where archaeological objects as boats, their parts or debris are exhibited together with historical yachts and a collection of kayaks. The second part is formed by the Conservation Workshop, where objects recovered from archaeological sites are preserved and restored or reconstructed. Visitors have a good view on the workshop and stages of the restoration process.
- Museum ship Sołdek – on a steam powered coal and ore carrier, built in 1949, visitors may see the construction and equipment of the vessel, as well as the living and working conditions of her crew.
- Museum ship Dar Pomorza – a full-rigged ship built in 1909; from 1929 until 1983 it served as a training vessel of Polish maritime schools. Presently it is used to demonstrate the construction of a tall ship and the history of Polish maritime schools. Additional exhibition space is devoted to Karol Olgierd Borchardt – Polish officer and writer who was Chief Officer on Dar Pomorza in 1938–1939.

== See also ==
- National Museum, Gdańsk
